= 1923 =

1923 in various calendars
- Gregorian calendar: 1923; MCMXXIII
- Ab urbe condita: 2676
- Armenian calendar: 1372; ԹՎ ՌՅՀԲ
- Assyrian calendar: 6673
- Baháʼí calendar: 79–80
- Balinese saka calendar: 1844–1845
- Bengali calendar: 1329–1330
- Berber calendar: 2873
- British Regnal year: 13 Geo. 5 – 14 Geo. 5
- Buddhist calendar: 2467
- Burmese calendar: 1285
- Byzantine calendar: 7431–7432
- Chinese calendar: 壬戌年 (Water Dog); 4620 or 4413 — to — 癸亥年 (Water Pig); 4621 or 4414
- Coptic calendar: 1639–1640
- Discordian calendar: 3089
- Ethiopian calendar: 1915–1916
- Hebrew calendar: 5683–5684
- Hindu calendars
- Vikram Samvat: 1979–1980
- Shaka Samvat: 1844–1845
- Kali Yuga: 5023–5024
- Holocene calendar: 11923
- Igbo calendar: 923–924
- Iranian calendar: 1301–1302
- Islamic calendar: 1341–1342
- Japanese calendar: Taishō 12 (大正１２年)
- Javanese calendar: 1853–1854
- Juche calendar: 12
- Julian calendar: Gregorian minus 13 days
- Korean calendar: 4256
- Minguo calendar: ROC 12 民國12年
- Nanakshahi calendar: 455
- Thai solar calendar: 2465–2466
- Tibetan calendar: ཆུ་ཕོ་ཁྱི་ལོ་ (male Water-Dog); 2049 or 1668 or 896 — to — ཆུ་མོ་ཕག་ལོ་ (female Water-Boar); 2050 or 1669 or 897

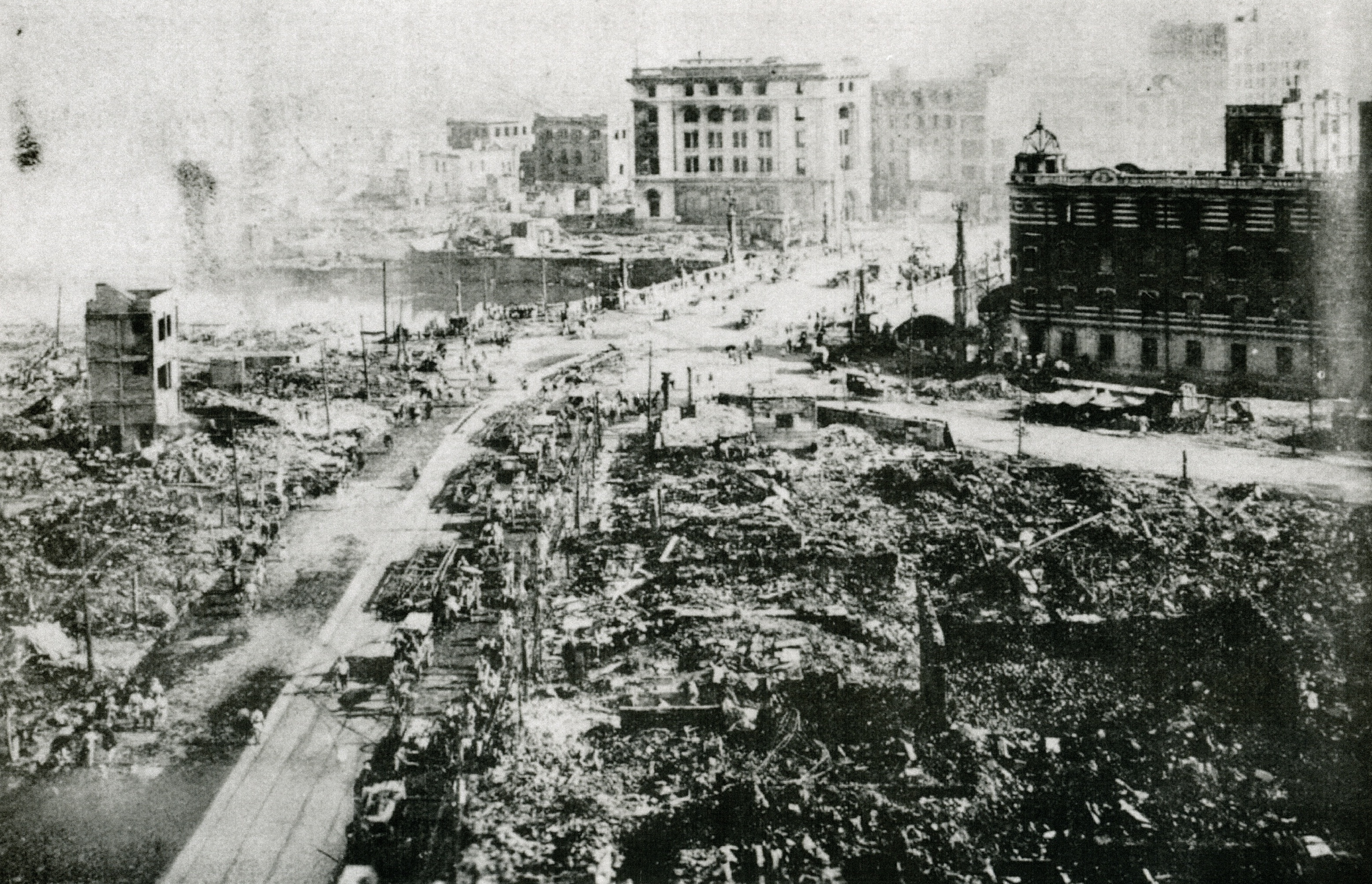
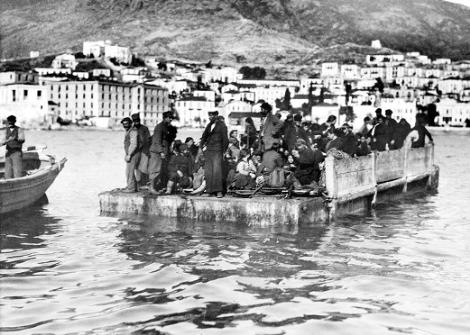
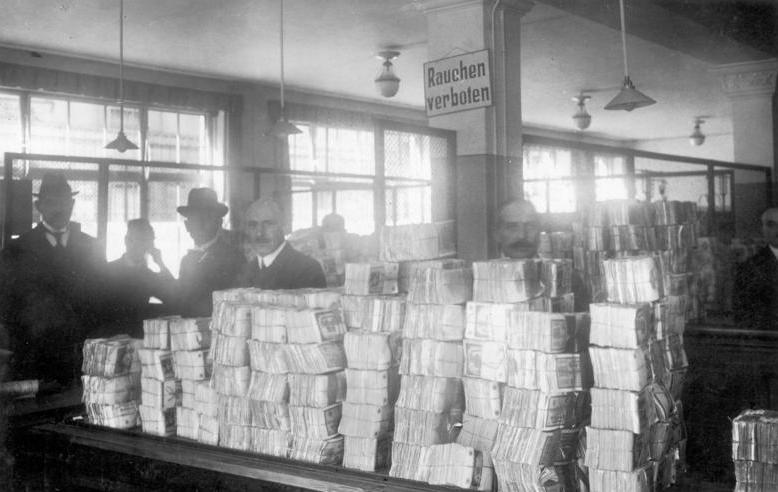
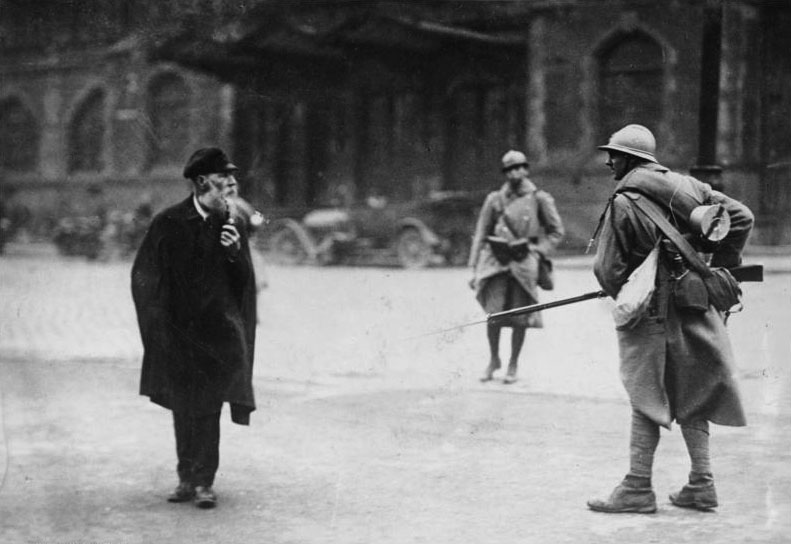
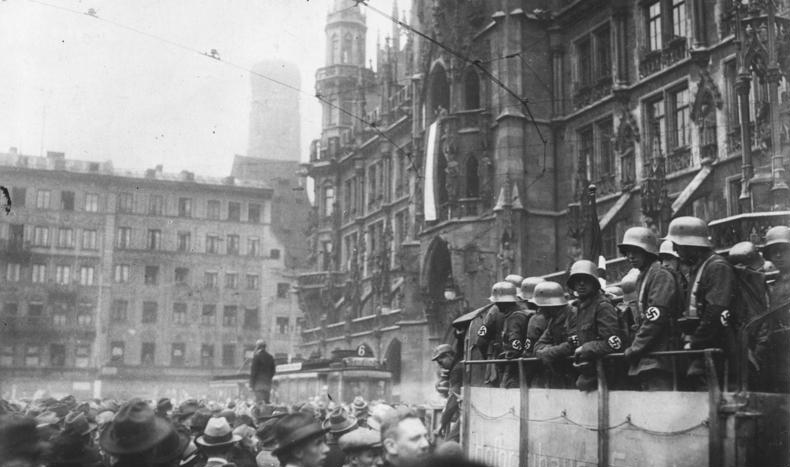
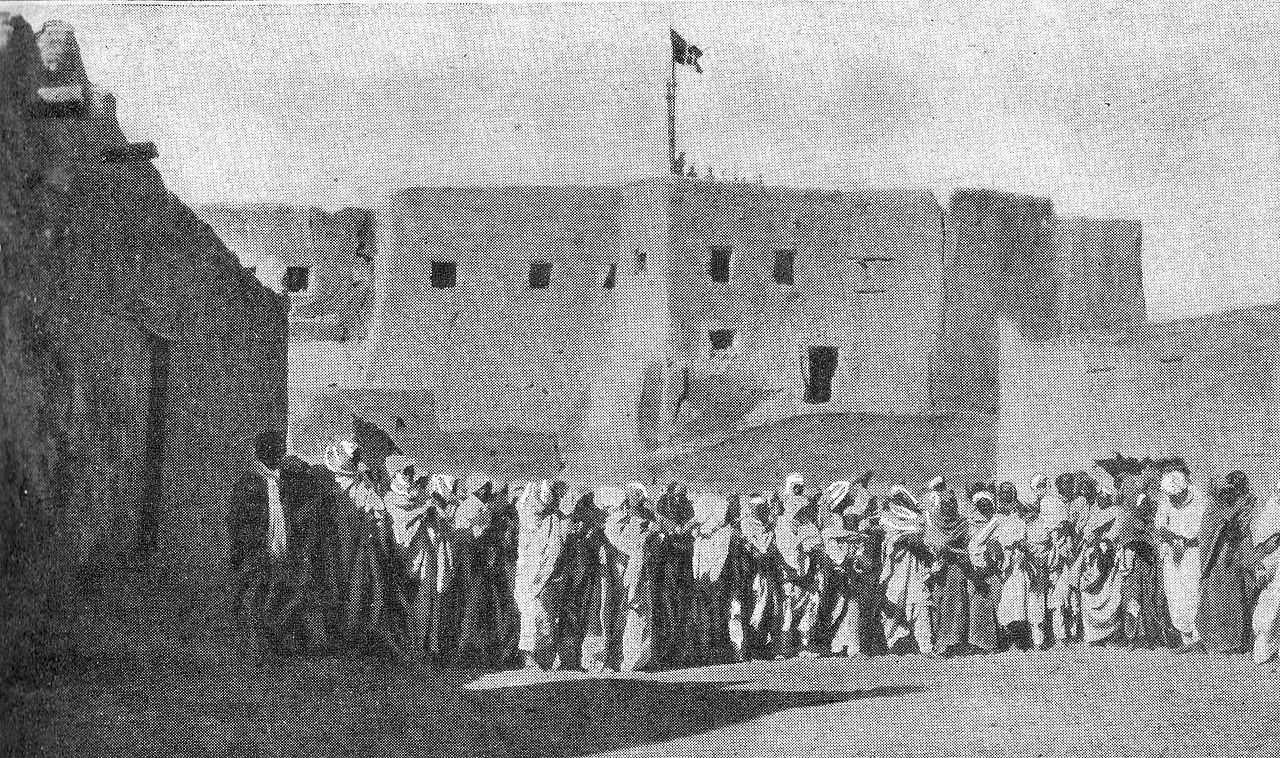
From top to bottom, left to right:
- The Great Kantō earthquake devastates Tokyo and Yokohama, killing over 100,000 and leveling much of the region;
- The Population exchange between Greece and Turkey under the Treaty of Lausanne forcibly relocates 1.5 million people, reshaping both nations’ demographics;
- Hyperinflation in the Weimar Republic renders the German mark nearly worthless, causing widespread economic and social upheaval;
- The Occupation of the Ruhr by French and Belgian forces begins over World War I reparations, worsening political unrest and the economic crisis;
- The Beer Hall Putsch in Munich sees Adolf Hitler and the Nazi Party fail to seize power, shaping Hitler’s future strategy;
- The Second Italo-Senussi War ends with Italian consolidation of Libya, completing their colonial ambitions in North Africa.

1923 (MCMXXIII) was a common year starting on Monday of the Gregorian calendar, the 1923rd year of the Common Era (CE) and Anno Domini (AD) designations, the 923rd year of the 2nd millennium, the 23rd year of the 20th century, and the 4th year of the 1920s decade. As of the start of 1923, the Gregorian calendar was 13 days ahead of the Julian calendar, which was relegated that February to use only by churches after Greece adopted the Gregorian calendar.

In Greece, this year contained only 352 days as 13 days were skipped to achieve the calendrical switch from Julian to Gregorian Calendar. It happened there that Wednesday, February 15 (Julian Calendar) was followed by Thursday, March 1 (Gregorian Calendar).

== Events ==
=== January–February ===
- January 5 – Lithuania begins the Klaipėda Revolt to annex the Klaipėda Region (Memel Territory).
- January 11 – Despite strong British protests, troops from France and Belgium occupy the Ruhr area, to force Germany to make reparation payments.
- January 17 (or 9) – First flight of the first rotorcraft, Juan de la Cierva's Cierva C.4 autogyro, in Spain. (It is first demonstrated to the military on January 31.)
- February 5 – Australian cricketer Bill Ponsford makes 429 runs to break the world record for the highest first-class cricket score for the first time in his third match at this level, at Melbourne Cricket Ground, giving the Victoria cricket team an innings total of 1,059.
- February 9 – Billy Hughes, having resigned as Prime Minister of Australia, after the Country Party refuses to govern in coalition with him as the leader of the Nationalist Party, is succeeded by Stanley Bruce. A Liberal–National Coalition will persist in the politics of Australia for at least 100 years.

=== March–April ===
- March 1 – Eskom, the largest electricity producer in Africa, is established in South Africa.
- March 3 – The first issue of TIME magazine is published.
- March 6 – The Egyptian Feminist Union (Arabic: الاتحاد النسائي المصري), the first nationwide feminist movement in Egypt, is founded at the home of activist Huda Sha'arawi.
- March 9 – Vladimir Lenin suffers his third stroke, which renders him bedridden and unable to speak; consequently he retires from his position as Chairman of the Soviet government.
- March 17 – Dobrolyot is formed as the first Soviet civil aviation service; it will become part of flag carrier Aeroflot.
- March 28 – Regia Aeronautica, the air force of Fascist Italy, is founded.
- April 6 – The first Prefects Board in Southeast Asia is formed, in Victoria Institution, Federated Malay States.
- April 12 – The Kandersteg International Scout Centre comes into existence in Switzerland.
- April 19
  - Hjalmar Branting leaves office as Prime Minister of Sweden, after the Swedish Riksdag has rejected a government proposal regarding unemployment benefits. Right-wing academic and jurist Ernst Trygger succeeds him.
  - The Egyptian Constitution of 1923 is adopted, introducing a parliamentary system of democracy in the country.
- April 23 – The Gdynia seaport is inaugurated, on the Polish Corridor.
- April 26 – Wedding of Prince Albert and Lady Elizabeth Bowes-Lyon: The future King George VI of the United Kingdom marries the future Queen Elizabeth the Queen Mother in Westminster Abbey.
- April 28 – The original Wembley Stadium in London, England, opens its doors to the public for the first time, staging the FA Cup Final between Bolton Wanderers and West Ham United.

=== May–June ===
- May 9
  - Southeastern Michigan receives a record 15 centimetres (5.9 in) of snow, after temperatures plummeted from 17 °F (−8 °C) to 1 °F (−17 °C) between 1 and 6 pm on the previous day.
  - The premiere of Bertolt Brecht's play In the Jungle (Im Dickicht), at the Residenztheater in Munich, is interrupted by Nazi demonstrators.
- May 20 – British Prime Minister Bonar Law resigns, due to ill health.
- May 23
  - Stanley Baldwin is appointed British Prime Minister.
  - Belgium's Sabena Airlines is created.
- May 24 – The Irish Civil War ends.
- May 26 – The first 24 Hours of Le Mans motor race is held, and is won by André Lagache and René Léonard.
- May 27 – The Ku Klux Klan in the United States defies a law requiring publication of its membership.
- June 9 – Bulgarian coup d'état of 1923: A military coup in Bulgaria ousts prime minister Aleksandar Stamboliyski (he is killed June 14).
- June 16 – The storming of Ayan in Siberia concludes the Yakut Revolt and the Russian Civil War.
- June 18 – Mount Etna erupts in Italy, making 60,000 homeless.

=== July–August ===
- July 10 – Large hailstones kill 23 people in Rostov, Soviet Union.
- July 13 – American explorer Roy Chapman Andrews discovers the first dinosaur eggs near Flaming Cliffs, Mongolia.
- July 24 – The Treaty of Lausanne (1923), settling the boundaries of the modern Republic of Turkey, is signed in Switzerland by Greece, Bulgaria and other countries that fought in the First World War, bringing an end to the Ottoman Empire after 624 years.
- July – Hyperinflation in the Weimar Republic (Germany) sees the number of marks needed to purchase a single American dollar reach 353,000 – more than 200 times the amount needed at the start of the year.
- August 2 – Vice President Calvin Coolidge becomes the 30th president of the United States, upon the death of President Warren G. Harding in San Francisco.
- August 13
  - The first major seagoing ship arrives at Gdynia, the newly constructed Polish seaport.
  - Gustav Stresemann is named Chancellor of Germany, and founds a coalition government for the Weimar Republic, where hyperinflation means that more than 4,600,000 marks are now needed to buy a single American dollar.
- August 18 – The first British Track & Field championships for women are held in London.
- August 30 – Hurricane season begins, with a tropical storm northeast of the Turks and Caicos Islands.
- August 31 – The Italian navy occupies Corfu, in retaliation for the murder of an Italian officer. The League of Nations protests, and the occupation ends on September 30.

=== September–October ===
- September 1
  - The Great Kantō earthquake devastates Tokyo and Yokohama, killing more than 100,000 people.
  - The Kantō Massacre begins and continues for several weeks. Ethnic Koreans are killed by lynch mobs based on rumors that Koreans are committing crimes and plotting to overthrow the government. The death toll (and even the occurrence of) the massacre is disputed, with figures ranging from a few dozen to over 6,000 deaths. Most of the deaths are of Korean people, although it is said that other ethnic minorities and even Japanese people with unusual dialects are also killed.
- September 4 – The United States Navy's first home-built rigid airship USS Shenandoah (ZR-1) makes her first flight at Naval Air Station Lakehurst (New Jersey); she contains most of the world's extracted reserves of helium at this time.
- September 6 – The Fukuda Village Incident occurs as a part of the larger Kantō Massacre. Nine Japanese people, including a pregnant woman and children, are killed based on false beliefs that they are ethnic Koreans.
- September 7 – At the International Police Conference in Vienna, the International Criminal Police Commission (ICPC), better known as Interpol, is set up.
- September 8 – Honda Point disaster: Nine United States Navy destroyers run aground off the California coast.
- September 9 – Turkish head of state Mustafa Kemal Atatürk founds the Republican People's Party (CHP).
- September 10 – The Irish Free State joins the League of Nations.
- September 13 – Military coup in Spain: Miguel Primo de Rivera takes over, setting up a dictatorship. Trade unions are prohibited for 10 years.
- September 17 – 1923 Berkeley fire: A major fire in Berkeley, California, erupts, consuming some 640 structures, including 584 homes in the densely built neighborhoods north of the campus of the University of California.
- September 26 – In Bavaria, Gustav Ritter von Kahr takes dictatorial powers.
- September 29
  - The first American Track & Field championships for women are held in New Jersey.
  - The League of Nations Mandate for Palestine (1922) comes into effect, officially creating under British administration the protectorates of Palestine and the separate Emirate of Transjordan under Abdullah I. The French-administered Mandate for Syria and Lebanon also takes effect.
- September 30 – Küstrin Putsch: Outside Berlin, Major Ernst Buchrucker, a leader of the Black Reichswehr, attempts a putsch by seizing several forts.
- October 1 – The Johor–Singapore Causeway opens to public traffic.
- October 2 – Küstrin Putsch: After two days of siege, Major Buchrucker and his men surrender.
- October 6 – The Occupation of Constantinople ends when the great powers of World War I withdraw.
- October 13
  - Ankara replaces Istanbul (Constantinople), as the capital of Turkey.
  - The first recorded example of a storm crossing from the Eastern Pacific into the Atlantic occurs in Oaxaca.
- October 14 – The fourth tropical storm of the year forms just north of Panama.
- October 15 – The fifth tropical storm of the year forms north of the Leeward Islands.
- October 16
  - A sixth tropical storm develops in the Gulf of Mexico; a rare occurrence, it consists of four active tropical storms simultaneously.
  - Roy and Walt Disney found The Walt Disney Company, at this time known as the Disney Brothers Studio.
- October 23 – Hamburg Uprising: In Germany, the Communists attempt a putsch in Hamburg, which results in street battles in that city for the next two days, when it ends unsuccessfully.
- October 27 – In Germany, General Hans von Seeckt orders the Reichswehr to dissolve the Social Democratic-Communist government of Saxony, which is refusing to accept the authority of the Reich government.
- October 28 – In Qajar dynasty Persia, Reza Khan becomes Ahmad Shah Qajar's prime minister.
- October 29 – Turkey becomes a republic, following the dissolution of the Ottoman Empire; Kemal Atatürk is elected as first president.
- October 30 – İsmet İnönü is appointed as the first prime minister of Turkey.

=== November–December ===
- November 1
  - The Finnish flag carrier airline Finnair is started, as Aero oy.
  - The 1923 Victorian Police strike begins in Australia, with half of the Victoria Police force standing down over the use of labor spies. Rioting and looting take place in Melbourne city centre.
- November 8 – Beer Hall Putsch: In Munich, Adolf Hitler leads the Nazis in an unsuccessful attempt to overthrow the Bavarian government; police and troops crush the attempt the next day in one of several significant events on 9 November in German history. 20 people die as a result of associated violence.
- November 11 – Adolf Hitler is arrested for his leading role in the Beer Hall Putsch.
- November 12 – Her Highness Princess Maud of Fife marries Captain Charles Alexander Carnegie, in Wellington Barracks, London.
- November 15 – Hyperinflation in the Weimar Republic: Hyperinflation in Germany reaches its height. One United States dollar is worth 4,200,000,000,000 Papiermark (4.2 trillion on the short scale). Gustav Stresemann abolishes the old currency and replaces it with the Rentenmark, at an exchange rate of one Rentenmark to 1,000,000,000,000 (one trillion on the short scale) Papiermark (effective November 20).
- November 23 - The 1923 Irish hunger strikes end. Thousands of Irish republicans took part in prisons across Ireland; five prisoners died in the hunger strikes.
- November 23 – Gustav Stresemann's coalition government collapses in Germany.
- December 1 – In Italy, the Gleno Dam on the Gleno River, in the Valle di Scalve in the northern province of Bergamo, bursts, killing at least 356 people.
- December 6
  - 1923 United Kingdom general election: The governing Conservatives under Stanley Baldwin fail to achieve an overall majority and allow the Labour Party to form a minority government.
  - Calvin Coolidge addresses the United States Congress in the first radio broadcast from a President of the U.S.
- December 21 – The Nepal–Britain Treaty is the first to define the international status of Nepal as an independent sovereign country.
- December 27 – Toranomon Incident: In Tokyo, Crown Prince Hirohito of Japan survives an assassination attempt by communist student Daisuke Nanba.
- December 29 – Vladimir K. Zworykin files his first patent (in the United States) for "television systems".

== Births ==
=== January ===
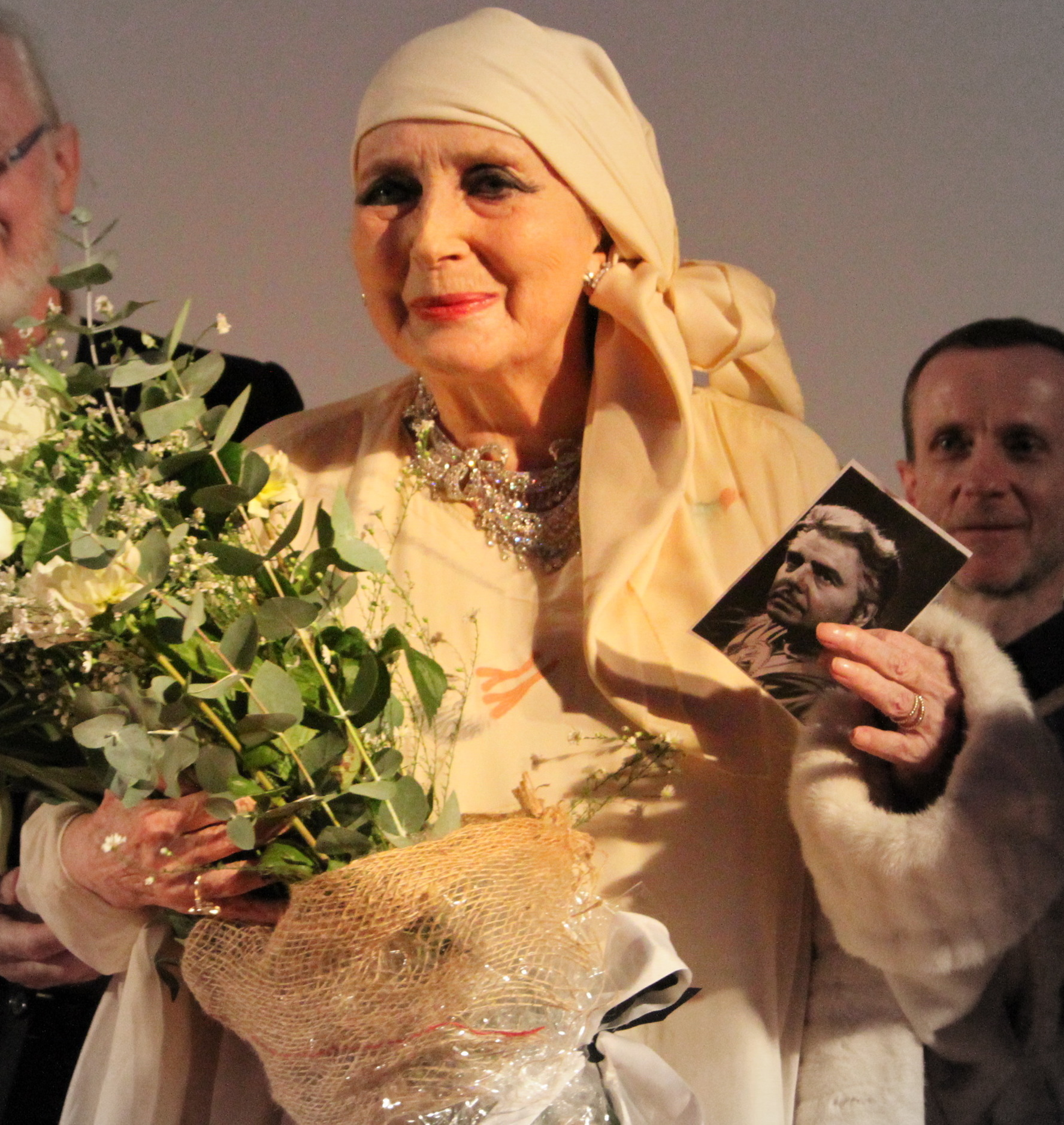
Valentina Cortese

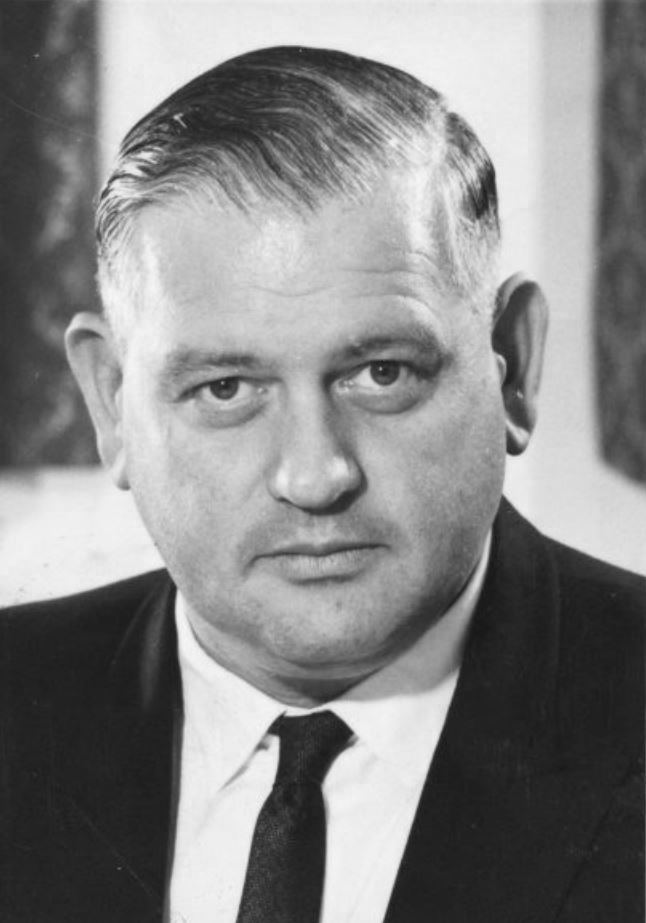
Norman Kirk

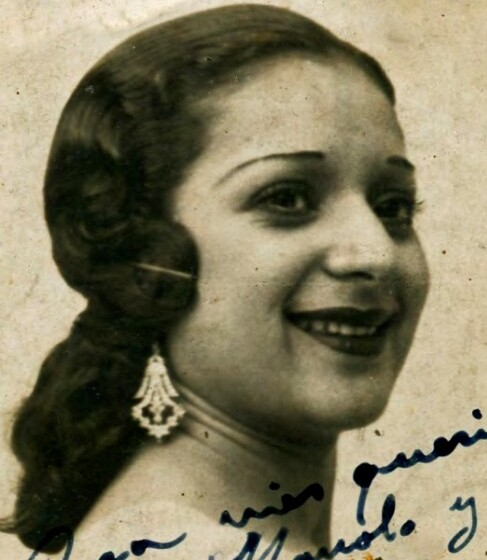
Lola Flores

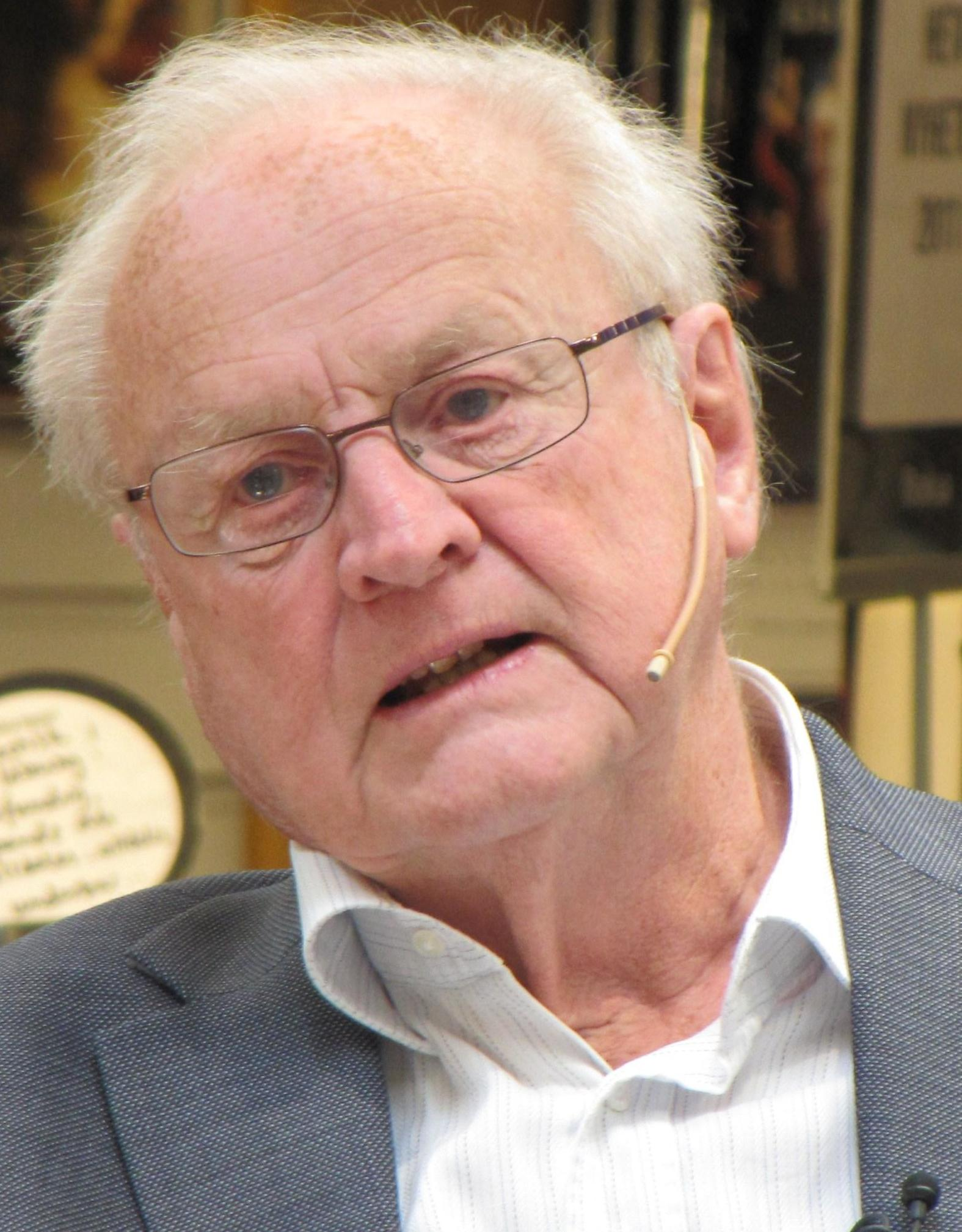
Arvid Carlsson

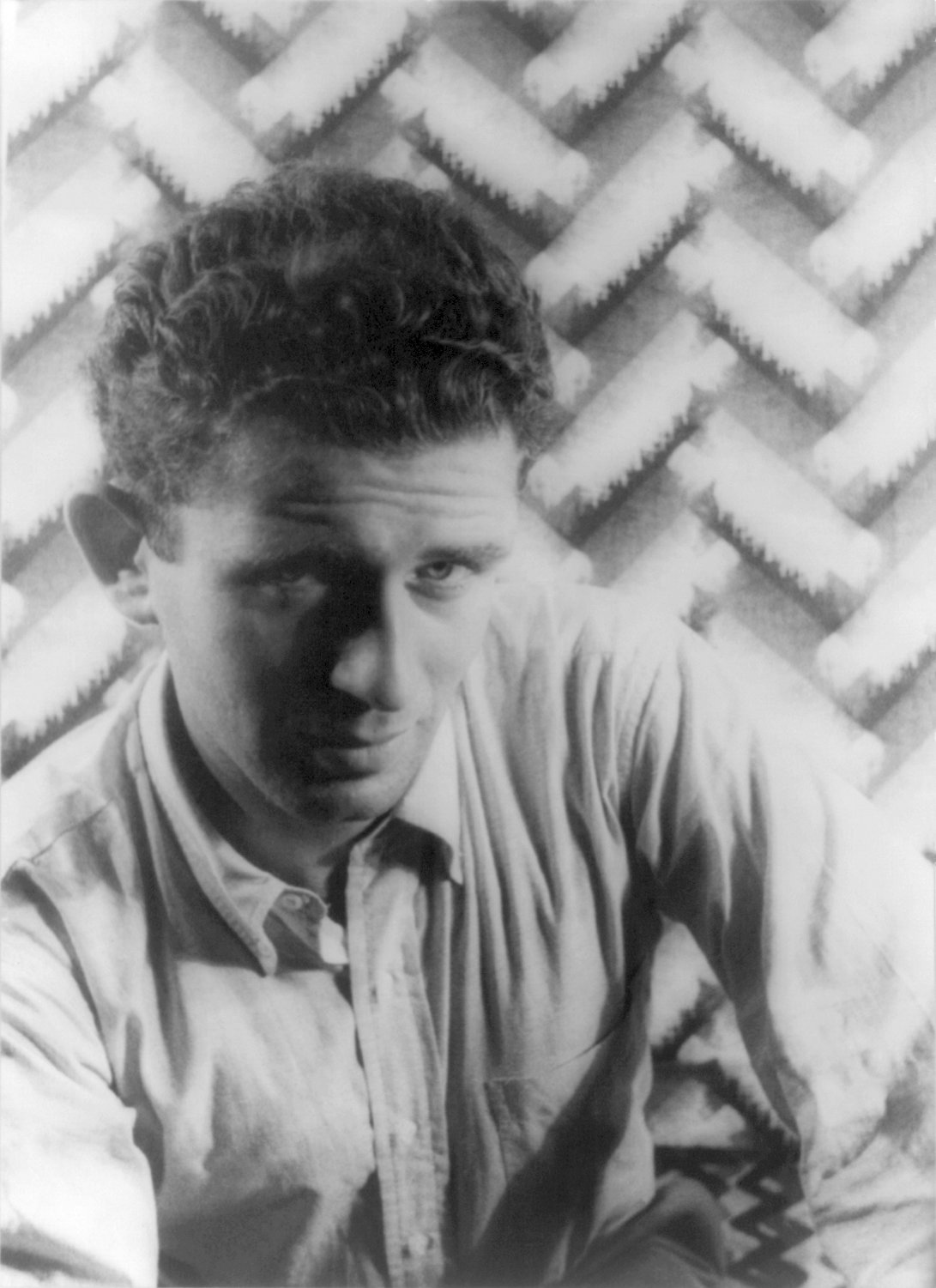
Norman Mailer

- January 1
  - Valentina Cortese, Italian actress (d. 2019)
  - Vulo Radev, Bulgarian film director (d. 2001)
- January 2 – Abdel Aziz Mohamed Hegazy, 38th Prime Minister of Egypt (d. 2014)
- January 5 – Sam Phillips, American record producer (d. 2003)
- January 6 – Norman Kirk, 29th Prime Minister of New Zealand (d. 1974)
- January 7 – Jean Lucienbonnet, French racing driver (d. 1962)
- January 8
  - Larry Storch, American actor (d. 2022)
  - Johnny Wardle, English cricketer (d. 1985)
- January 11
  - Wright King, American actor (d. 2018)
  - Paavo Lonkila, Finnish Olympic cross-country skier (d. 2017)
  - Ernst Nolte, German historian (d. 2016)
- January 12 – Ira Hayes, U.S. Marine flag raiser on Iwo Jima (d. 1955)
- January 15 – Lee Teng-hui, Taiwanese politician, 4th President of the Republic of China (d. 2020)
- January 16 – Anthony Hecht, American poet (d. 2004)
- January 20
  - Nora Brockstedt, Norwegian singer (d. 2015)
  - Slim Whitman, American country & western musician (d. 2013)
- January 21 – Prince Andrew Romanov, Russian-American artist and author (d. 2021)
- January 22 – Diana Douglas, British-born American actress, mother of actor/producer Michael Douglas (d. 2015)
- January 23
  - Horace Ashenfelter, American athlete (d. 2018)
  - Silvano Campeggi, Italian film poster designer (d. 2018)
- January 24 – Geneviève Asse, French painter (d. 2021)
- January 25
  - Arvid Carlsson, Swedish scientist, recipient of the Nobel Prize in Physiology or Medicine (d. 2018)
  - Dirk Bernard Joseph Schouten, Dutch economist (d. 2018)
- January 26 – Anne Jeffreys, American actress, singer (d. 2017)
- January 27 – Enrico Braggiotti, Monegasque banker (d. 2019)
- January 28
  - Erling Lorentzen, Norwegian shipowner and industrialist (d. 2021)
  - Sante Spessotto, Italian Roman Catholic priest and saint (d. 1980)
- January 29 – Paddy Chayefsky, American writer (d. 1981)
- January 31 – Norman Mailer, American novelist, journalist and dramatist (d. 2007)

=== February ===
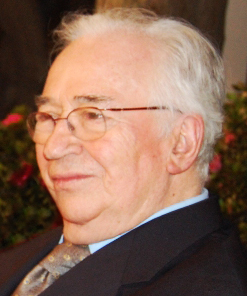
Belisario Betancur

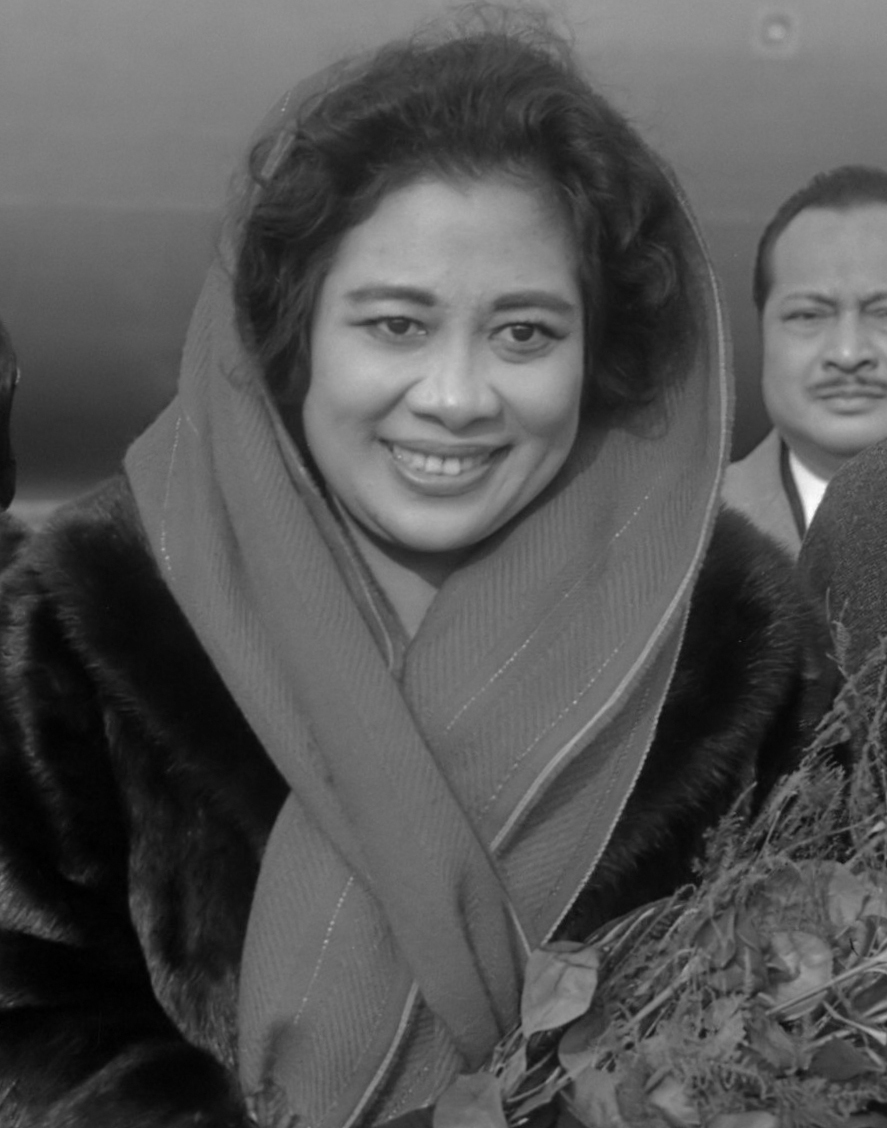
Fatmawati

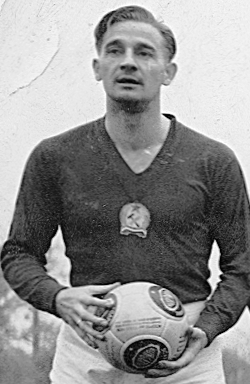
Gyula Lóránt

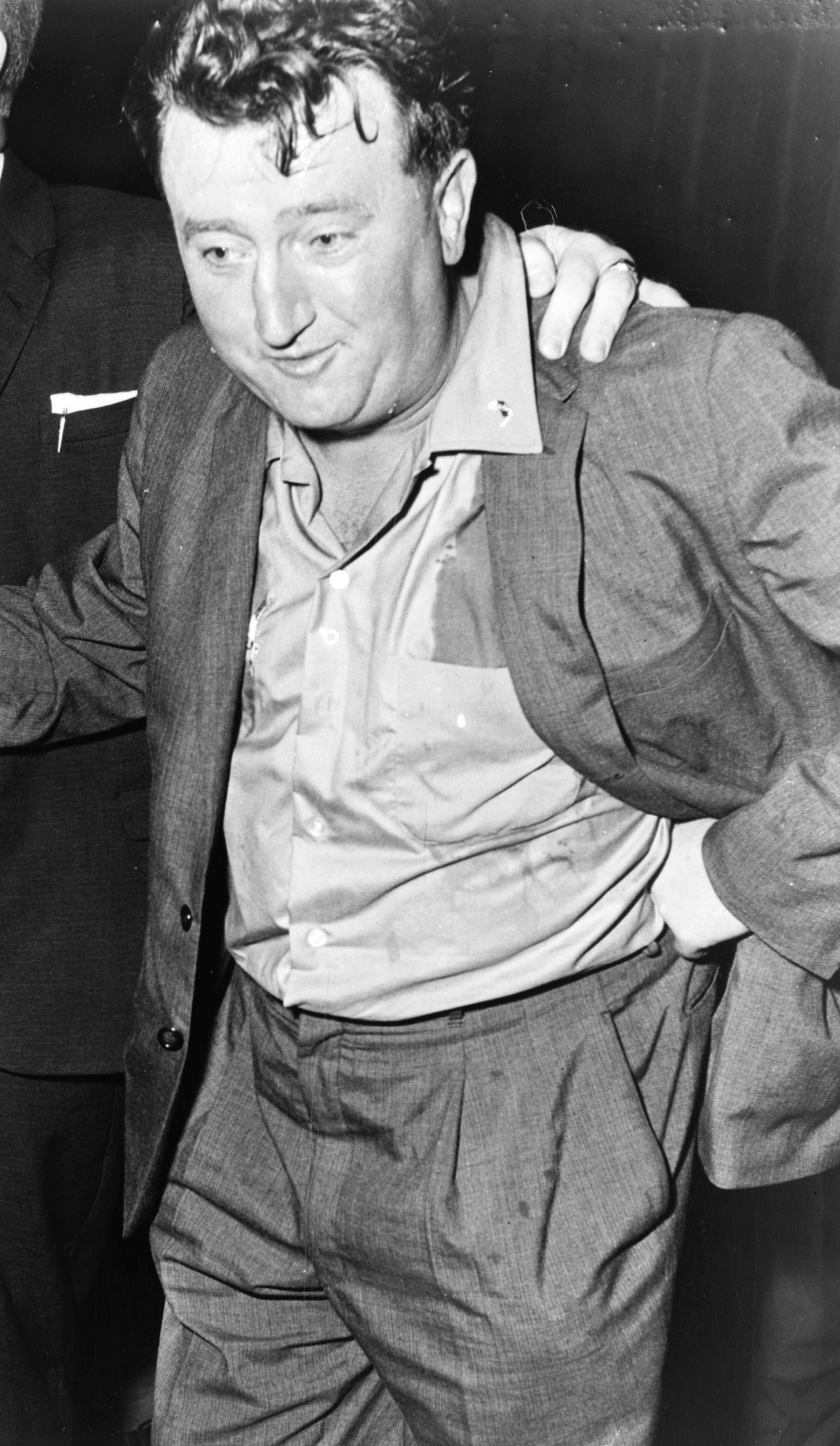
Brendan Behan

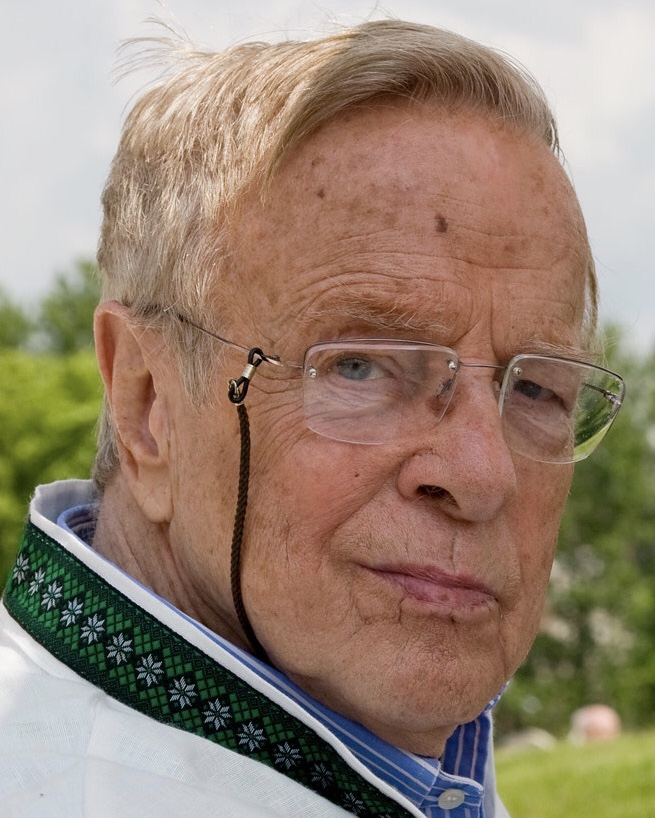
Franco Zeffirelli

- February 1
  - Stig Mårtensson, Swedish racing cyclist (d. 2010)
  - Gena Turgel, Polish author, Holocaust survivor and educator (d. 2018)
- February 2
  - James Dickey, American poet, author (Deliverance) (d. 1997)
  - Clem Windsor, Australian rugby union player, surgeon (d. 2007)
- February 3 – Edith Barney, American female professional baseball player (d. 2010)
- February 4
  - Bonar Bain, Canadian actor (d. 2005)
  - Belisario Betancur, Colombian politician, 26th President of Colombia (d. 2018)
- February 5
  - Fatmawati, 1st First Lady of Indonesia (d. 1980)
  - Claude King, American country music singer and songwriter (d. 2013)
- February 6
  - Gyula Lóránt, Hungarian footballer and manager (d. 1981)
  - Georges Pouliot, Canadian fencer (d. 2019)
  - Vija Vētra, Latvian dancer and choreographer (d. 2026)
- February 7 – George Lascelles, 7th Earl of Harewood, first grandchild of King George V (d. 2011)
- February 8 – Urpo Korhonen, Finnish Olympic cross-country skier (d. 2009)
- February 9 – Brendan Behan, Irish author (d. 1964)
- February 10 – Cesare Siepi, Italian opera singer (d. 2010)
- February 11
  - Antony Flew, English philosopher and academic (d. 2010)
  - Rosita Fornés, Cuban-American actress (d. 2020)
- February 12 – Franco Zeffirelli, Italian film, opera director (d. 2019)
- February 13
  - Yfrah Neaman, Lebanese-born violinist (d. 2003)
  - Chuck Yeager, American test pilot, NASA official (d. 2020)
- February 15 – Marcel Denis, Belgian comics artist (d. 2002)
- February 16 – Samuel Willenberg, Polish-born Israeli sculptor, painter and last surviving member of the Treblinka extermination camp revolt (d. 2016)
- February 17 – Jun Fukuda, Japanese film director (d. 2000)
- February 18 – Allan Melvin, American actor (d. 2008)
- February 20
  - Victor Atiyeh, American politician (d. 2014)
  - Forbes Burnham, Guyanese politician, 1st Prime Minister of Guyana and 2nd President of Guyana (d. 1985)
  - Robert Lucy, Swiss gymnast (d. 2009)
- February 21 – Wilbur R. Ingalls Jr., American architect (d. 1997)
- February 22 – Norman Smith, English singer, record producer (d. 2008)
- February 23 – Ioannis Grivas, Greek judge, politician and 176th Prime Minister of Greece (d. 2016)
- February 27 – Dexter Gordon, American jazz saxophone player, actor (d. 1990)
- February 28
  - Jean Carson, American actress (d. 2005)
  - Charles Durning, American actor (d. 2012)

=== March ===
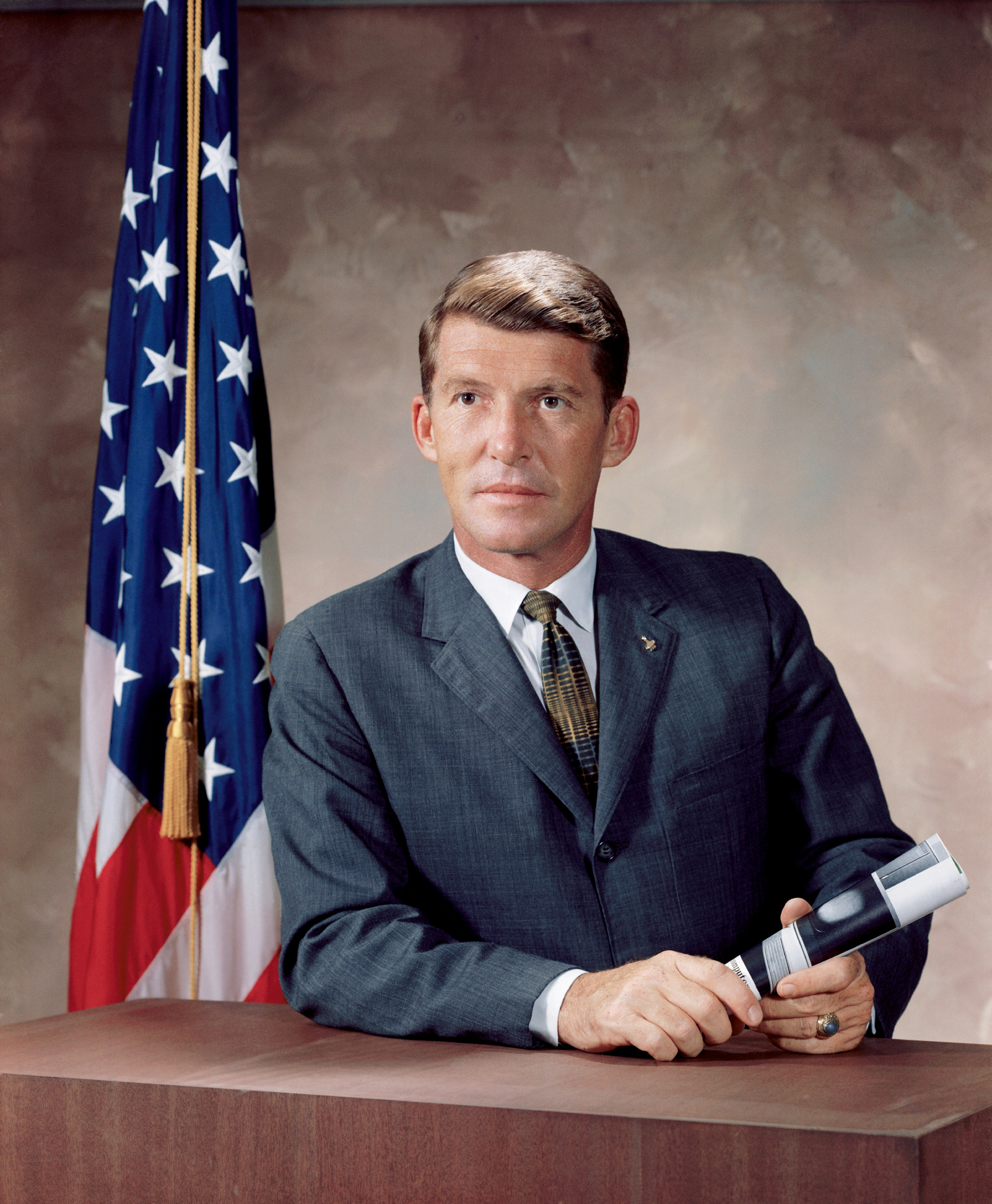
Wally Schirra

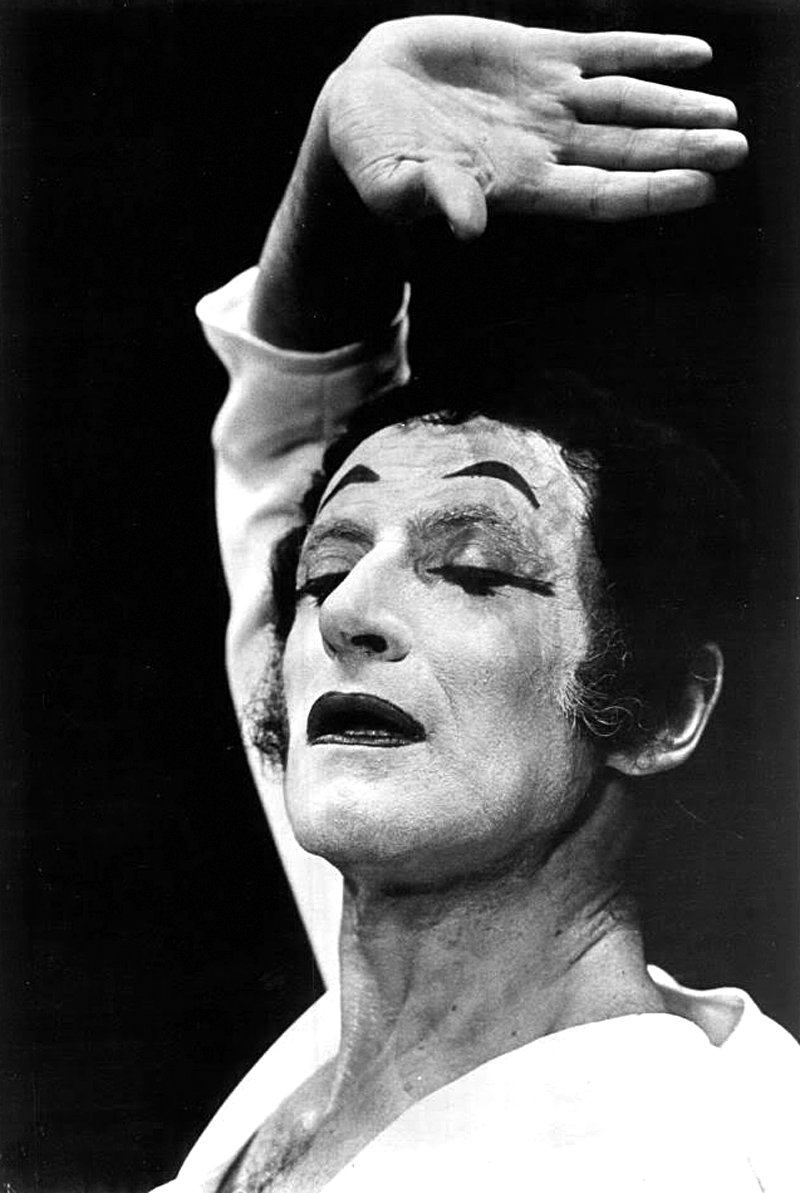
Marcel Marceau

- March 2
  - Orrin Keepnews, American record producer (d. 2015)
  - Robert H. Michel, American Republican Party politician (d. 2017)
- March 3 – Doc Watson, American folk guitarist, songwriter (d. 2012)
- March 4
  - Russell Freeburg, American journalist and author
  - Piero D'Inzeo, Italian Olympic show jumping rider (d. 2014)
  - Sir Patrick Moore, British astronomer, broadcaster (d. 2012)
- March 6
  - Ed McMahon, American television personality (d. 2009)
  - Wes Montgomery, African-American jazz musician (d. 1968)
- March 7
  - Mahlon Clark, American musician (d. 2007)
  - Thomas Keating, American monk (d. 2018)
- March 8 – Louk Hulsman, Dutch criminologist (d. 2009)
- March 9
  - James L. Buckley, American politician, United States Senator (1971–77) (d. 2023)
  - Walter Kohn, Austrian-born physicist, recipient of the Nobel Prize in Chemistry (d. 2016)
  - William Lyon, American major general (d. 2020)
- March 10 – Val Logsdon Fitch, American nuclear physicist, Nobel Prize laureate (d. 2015)
- March 11
  - Agatha Barbara, Maltese politician (d. 2002)
  - Paul Muller, Swiss actor (d. 2016)
- March 12
  - Hjalmar Andersen, Norwegian speed-skater (d. 2013)
  - Wally Schirra, American astronaut (d. 2007)
  - Mae Young, American wrestler (d. 2014)
- March 14
  - Diane Arbus, American photographer (d. 1971)
  - Joe M. Jackson, American Medal of Honour recipient (d. 2019)
  - Celeste Rodrigues, Portuguese singer (d. 2018)
- March 15
  - Lou Richards, Australian footballer (d. 2017)
  - Willy Semmelrogge, German actor (d. 1984)
- March 19 – Oskar Fischer, East German politician (d. 2020)
- March 21
  - Louis-Edmond Hamelin, Canadian geographer, author and academic (d. 2020)
  - Merle Keagle, American female professional baseball player (d. 1950)
  - Olive Nicol, Baroness Nicol, British politician, life peer (d. 2018)
  - Rezső Nyers, Hungarian politician (d. 2018)
  - Nirmala Srivastava, Indian founder of Sahaja Yoga (d. 2011)
- March 22 – Marcel Marceau, world-renowned French mime (d. 2007)
- March 24 – Murray Hamilton, American actor (d. 1986)
- March 25
  - Lewis Elton, German-English physicist and researcher (d. 2018)
  - Wim van Est, Dutch cyclist (d. 2003)
- March 26
  - Romolo Catasta, Italian Olympic rower (d. 1985)
  - Baba Hari Dass, Indian yoga master, silent monk, and commentator (d. 2018)
  - Bob Elliott, American comedian (d. 2016)
- March 27
  - Ulla Sallert, Swedish actress, singer (d. 2018)
  - Louis Simpson, Jamaican-born poet (d. 2012)
- March 28
  - Thad Jones, American jazz musician (d. 1986)
  - Ine Schäffer, Austrian athlete (d. 2009)
- March 29 – Geoff Duke, British motorcycle racer (d. 2015)
- March 31
  - Don Barksdale, American basketball player (d. 1993)
  - Shoshana Damari, Yemenite-Israeli singer (d. 2006)

=== April ===
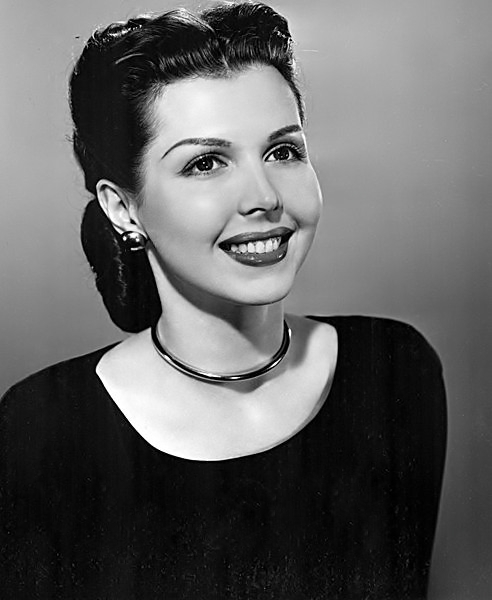
Ann Miller

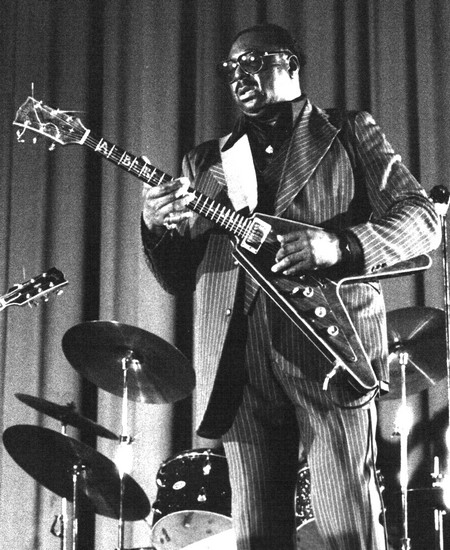
Albert King

- April 2
  - Alice Haylett, American professional baseball player (d. 2004)
  - Gloria Henry, American actress (d. 2021)
  - Johnny Paton, Scottish football player, coach and manager (d. 2015)
  - G. Spencer-Brown, British mathematician (d. 2016)
- April 4
  - Maximiano Tuazon Cruz, Filipino Roman Catholic prelate (d. 2013)
  - Gene Reynolds, American actor (d. 2020)
  - Peter Vaughan, English actor (d. 2016)
- April 5 – Nguyễn Văn Thiệu, 2nd President of South Vietnam (d. 2001)
- April 8
  - George Fisher, American political cartoonist (d. 2003)
  - Edward Mulhare, Irish-born American actor (d. 1997)
- April 10 – John Watkins, South African cricketer (d. 2021)
- April 12 – Ann Miller, American actress and dancer (d. 2004)
- April 13 – Don Adams, American actor, comedian (Get Smart) (d. 2005)
- April 14
  - Lydia Clarke, American actress, photographer (d. 2018)
  - Roberto De Vicenzo, Argentine professional golfer, winner of the 1967 Open Championship (d. 2017)
- April 15 – Douglas Wass, British civil servant (d. 2017)
- April 17 – Étienne Bally, French sprinter (d. 2018)
- April 19 – Sen Sōshitsu XV, Japanese hereditary master (d. 2025)
- April 20
  - Mother Angelica, American nun, founder of the Eternal Word Television Network (EWTN) (d. 2016)
  - Irene Lieblich, Polish-born painter (d. 2008)
- April 22
  - Paula Fox, American writer (d. 2017)
  - Geoffrey Hattersley-Smith, English/Canadian geologist and glaciologist (d. 2012)
  - Bettie Page, American model (d. 2008)
  - Aaron Spelling, American television producer, writer (d. 2006)
- April 23 – Dolph Briscoe, Governor of Texas (d. 2010)
- April 24 – Bülent Ulusu, 18th Prime Minister of Turkey (d. 2015)
- April 25
  - Francis Graham-Smith, English astronomer, academic (d. 2025)
  - Albert King, American musician (d. 1992)
  - Grant Munro, Canadian animator, filmmaker and actor (d. 2017)
- April 27 – Lloyd F. Wheat, American lawyer and politician (d. 2004)
- April 30
  - Al Lewis, American actor (The Munsters) (d. 2006)
  - Francis Tucker, South African rally driver (d. 2008)

=== May ===
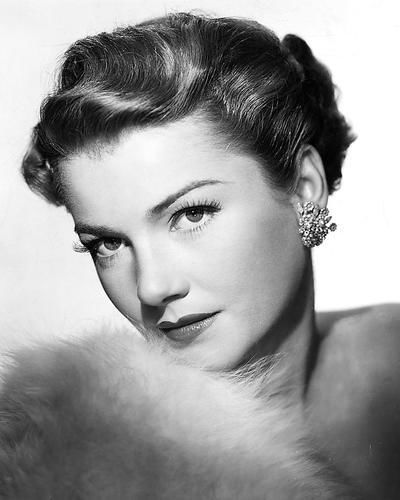
Anne Baxter

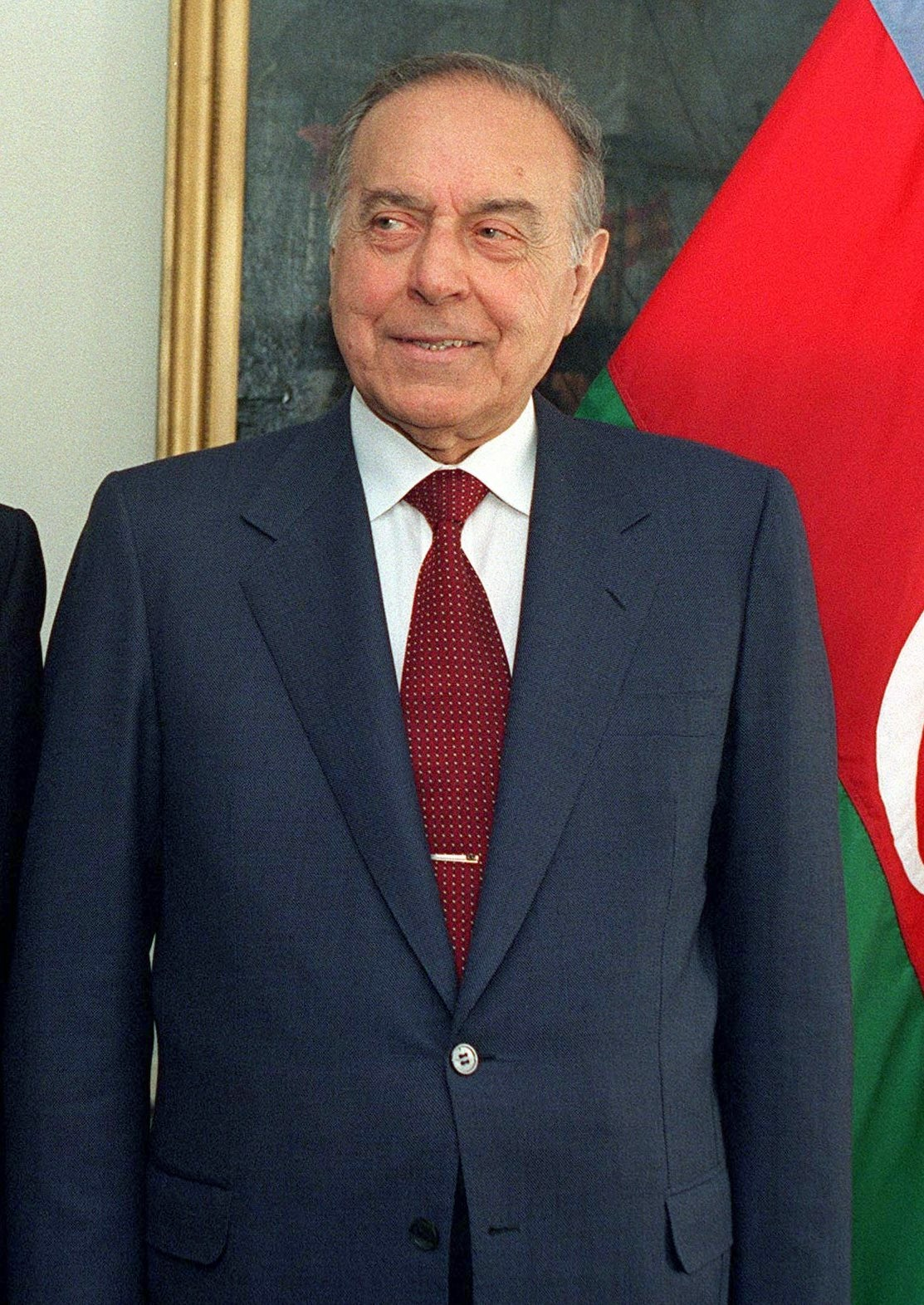
Heydar Aliyev

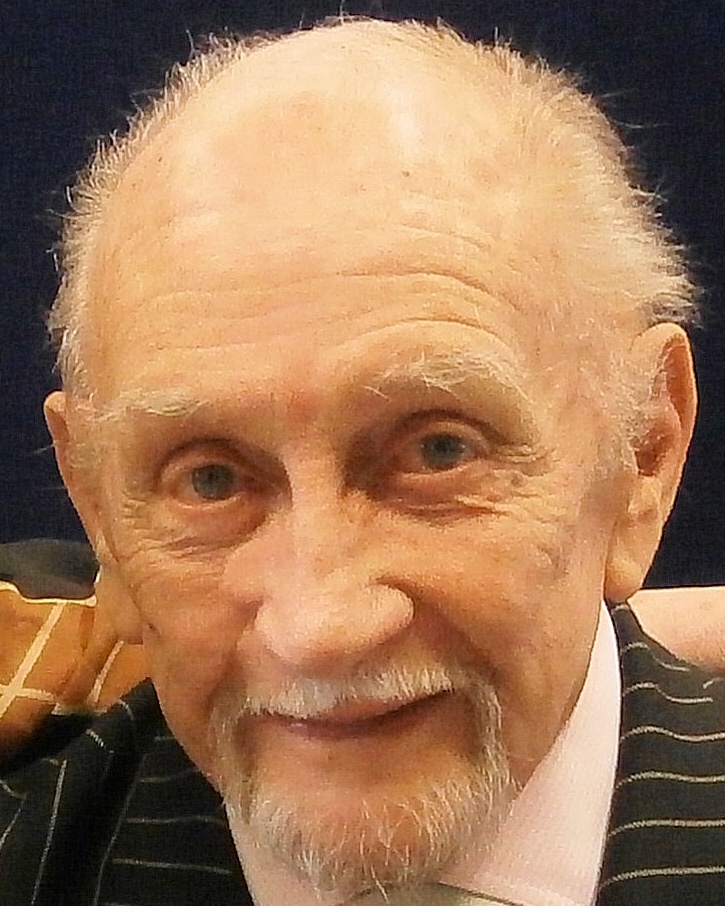
Roy Dotrice

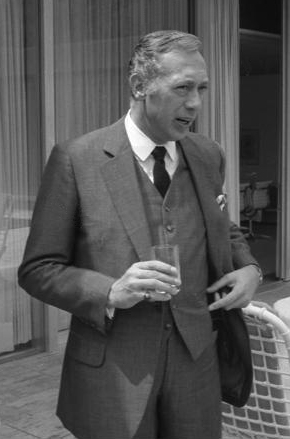
Horst Tappert

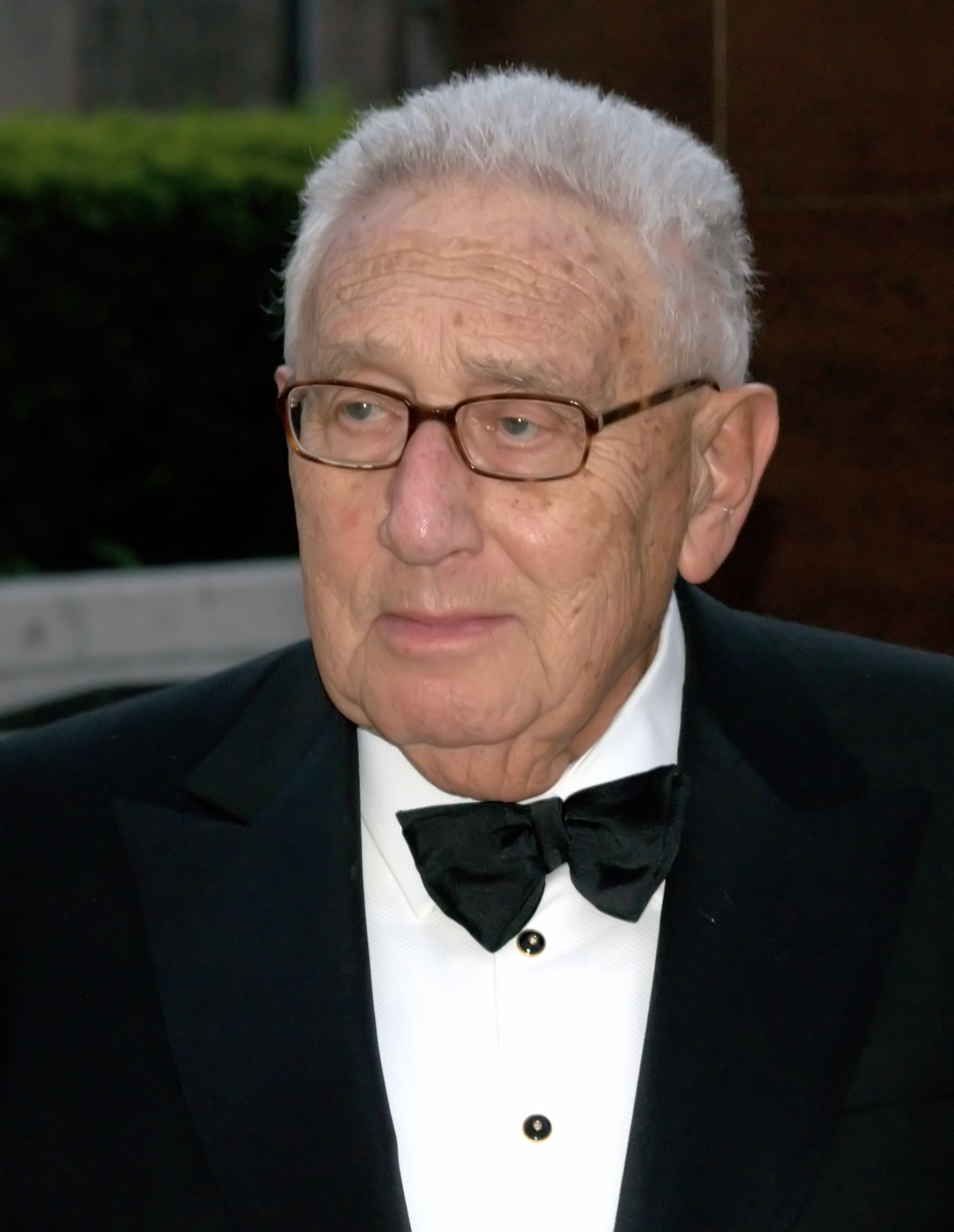
Henry Kissinger

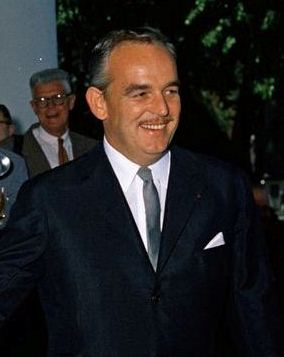
Rainier III

- May 1
  - Frank Brian, American basketball player (d. 2017)
  - Fernando Cabrita, Portuguese football forward, manager (d. 2014)
  - Joseph Heller, American novelist (Catch-22) (d. 1999)
  - Billy Steel, Scottish footballer (d. 1982)
- May 2 – Patrick Hillery, President of Ireland (d. 2008)
- May 3
  - Francesco Paolo Bonifacio, Italian politician and jurist (d. 1989)
  - Alexander Harvey II, American judge (d. 2017)
- May 4
  - Gillis William Long, American politician (d. 1985)
  - Assi Rahbani, Lebanese composer, musician, conductor, poet and author (d. 1986)
  - Eric Sykes, English actor (d. 2012)
- May 5
  - Sergey Akhromeyev, Soviet marshal, former Chief of the General Staff of the Soviet Armed Forces (d. 1991)
  - Edit Perényi-Weckinger, Hungarian gymnast (d. 2019)
  - Konrad Repgen, German historian (d. 2017)
  - Richard Wollheim, English philosopher (d. 2003)
- May 6
  - Josep Seguer, Spanish football defender, manager (d. 2014)
  - Archduchess Yolande of Austria (d. 2023)
- May 7
  - Anne Baxter, American actress (d. 1985)
  - Jim Lowe, American singer-songwriter (d. 2016)
  - J. Mack Robinson, American businessman (d. 2014)
- May 8 – Yusof Rawa, Malaysian politician (d. 2000)
- May 10 – Heydar Aliyev, 3rd President of Azerbaijan (1993–2003) (d. 2003)
- May 11 – Louise Arnold, American baseball player (d. 2010)
- May 13 – Ruth Adler Schnee, German-American textile, interior designer (d. 2023)
- May 14
  - Willis Blair, Canadian politician (d. 2014)
  - Josette Molland, WWII French Resistance member and artist (d. 2024)
  - Adnan Pachachi, Iraqi Foreign Minister (d. 2019)
  - Mrinal Sen, Indian filmmaker (d. 2018)
- May 15
  - Doris Dowling, American actress (d. 2004)
  - John Lanchbery, English composer (d. 2003)
  - Gholamreza Pahlavi, Persian prince (d. 2017)
- May 16
  - Merton Miller, American economist, Nobel Prize laureate (d. 2000)
  - Lingam Suryanarayana, Indian surgeon
- May 17
  - Anthony Eyton, English painter and educator
  - Peter Mennin, American composer, teacher and administrator (d. 1983)
  - David Wasawo, Kenyan zoologist, conservationist, and university administrator (d. 2014)
- May 18 – Hugh Shearer, Prime Minister of Jamaica (d. 2004)
- May 21
  - Vernon Biever, American photographer (d. 2010)
  - Armand Borel, Swiss mathematician (d. 2003)
  - Désiré Carré, French footballer (d. 2014)
  - Dorothy Hewett, Australian writer (d. 2002)
  - Ara Parseghian, American football coach (d. 2017)
  - Evelyn Ward, American actress (d. 2012)
- May 23 – Kalidas Shrestha, Nepalese artist (d. 2016)
- May 24 – Seijun Suzuki, Japanese filmmaker, actor and screenwriter (d. 2017)
- May 25 – Bernard Koura, French painter (d. 2018)
- May 26
  - James Arness, American actor (Gunsmoke) (d. 2011)
  - Roy Dotrice, English actor (d. 2017)
  - Horst Tappert, German television actor (d. 2008)
- May 27
  - Henry Kissinger, German-born United States Secretary of State, recipient of the Nobel Peace Prize (d. 2023)
  - Sumner Redstone, American businessman (d. 2020)
  - Alfonso Wong, Hong Kong cartoonist (d. 2017)
- May 28
  - György Ligeti, Hungarian composer (d. 2006)
  - N. T. Rama Rao, Indian (Telugu) film actor, politician (d. 1996)
  - T. M. Thiagarajan, Carnatic musicologist from Tamil Nadu in Southern India (d. 2007)
- May 30 – Jimmy Lydon, American actor, producer (d. 2022)
- May 31
  - Ellsworth Kelly, American artist (d. 2015)
  - Rainier III, Prince of Monaco (d. 2005)

=== June ===
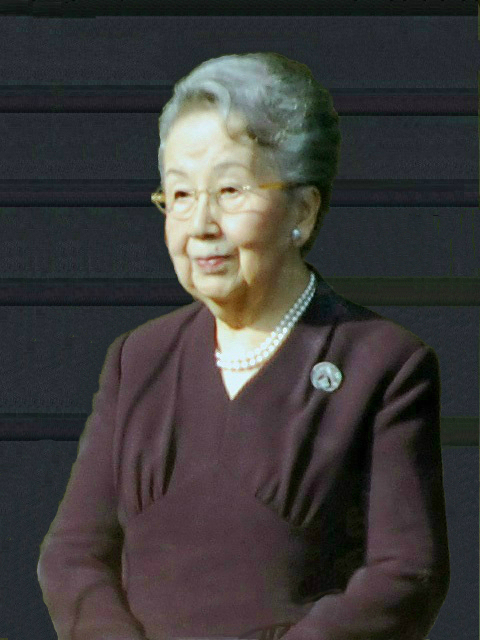
Yuriko

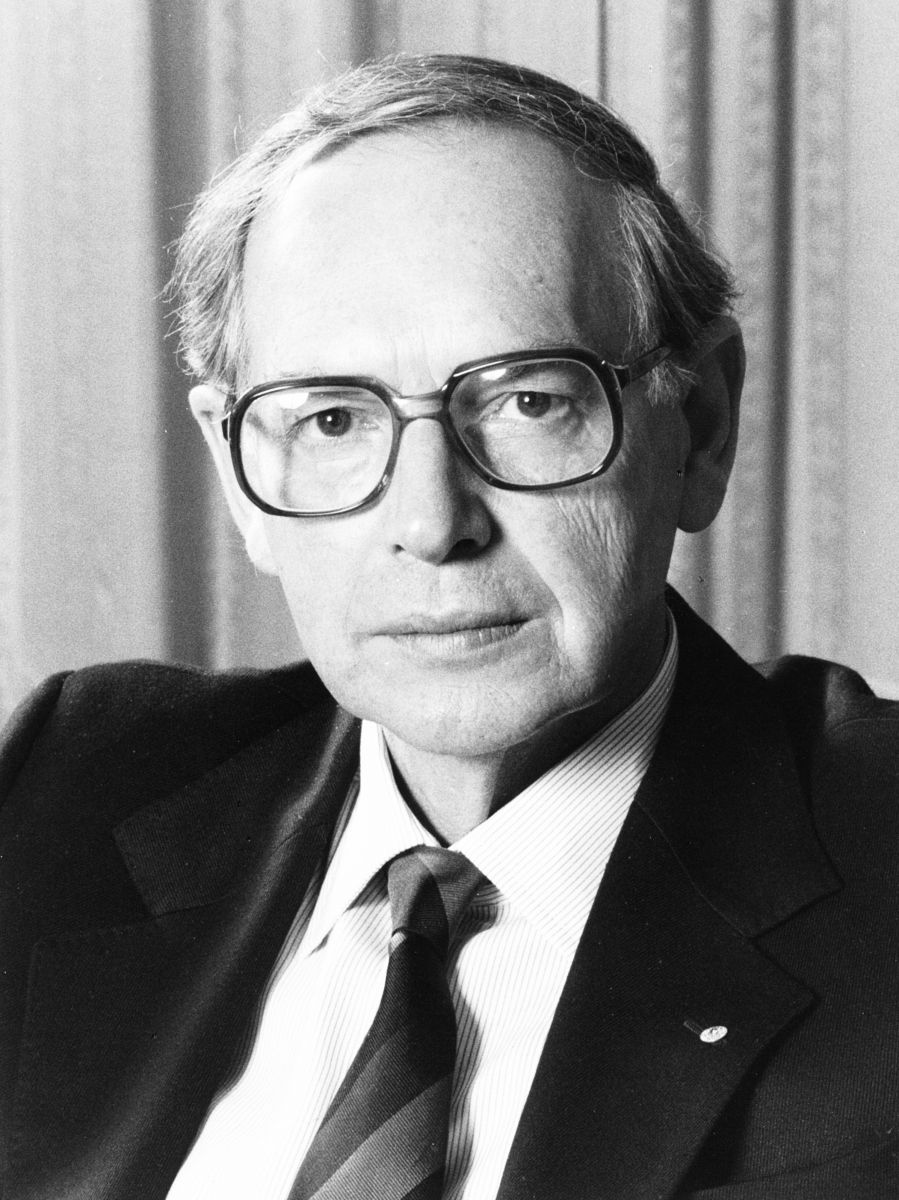
Ninian Stephen

- June 2
  - Ted Leehane, Australian rules footballer (d. 2014)
  - Lloyd Shapley, American mathematician, economist and Nobel Prize laureate (d. 2016)
- June 3 – Peter Thorne, British Royal Air Force pilot (d. 2014)
- June 4 – Yuriko, Princess Mikasa, Japanese princess (d. 2024)
- June 5 – Peggy Stewart, American actress (d. 2019)
- June 6
  - V. C. Andrews, American novelist (d. 1996)
  - Jeff Dwire, American small businessman (d. 1974)
- June 7
  - Jean Baratte, French international footballer, striker and manager (d. 1986)
  - Giorgio Belladonna, Italian bridge player, one of the greatest of all time (d. 1995)
  - Harold Garde, American artist (d. 2022)
- June 8 – Tang Hsiang Chien, Hong Kong industrialist (d. 2018)
- June 9
  - Gerald Götting, German politician (d. 2015)
  - I. H. Latif, Indian military officer (d. 2018)
- June 10 – Robert Maxwell, Slovak-born media entrepreneur (d. 1991)
- June 12
  - Juan Arza, Spanish football forward, manager (d. 2011)
  - Herta Elviste, Estonian actress (d. 2015)
- June 13 – Lloyd Conover, American scientist (d. 2017)
- June 14
  - Judith Kerr, English writer and illustrator (d. 2019)
  - Donald Smith, English cricketer (d. 2021)
- June 15
  - Herbert Chitepo, Zimbabwe African National Union leader (d. 1975)
  - Johnny Most, American basketball radio announcer (d. 1993)
  - Ninian Stephen, 20th Governor-General of Australia (d. 2017)
- June 16 – Wanda Janicka, Polish architect, participant in the Warsaw Uprising (d. 2023)
- June 17
  - William G. Adams, 9th mayor of St. John's, member of the Newfoundland and Labrador House of Assembly (d. 2005)
  - Anthony Bevilacqua, American Roman Catholic cardinal (d. 2012)
  - W. M. Gorman, Irish economist, academic (d. 2003)
  - Arnold S. Relman, American internist (d. 2014)
  - Jan Veselý, Czech cyclist (d. 2003)
- June 18 – Szymon Szurmiej, Polish-Jewish actor, director, and general manager (d. 2014)
- June 19 – Andrés Rodríguez, 47th President of Paraguay (d. 1997)
- June 20
  - Bjørn Watt-Boolsen, Danish actor (d. 1998)
  - Franklin B. Zimmerman, American musicologist and conductor
- June 21 – Johann Eyfells, Icelandic artist (d. 2019)
- June 22
  - John Oldham, American college player, athletic director and basketball coach (d. 2020)
  - Felo Ramírez, Cuban-American Spanish-language radio voice of the Miami Marlins (d. 2017)
- June 23
  - André Antunes, Portuguese sports shooter (d. 2002)
  - Makhmut Gareev, Russian general (d. 2019)
  - Doris Johnson, American politician (d. 2021)
  - Mario Milita, Italian actor and voice actor (d. 2017)
  - Ranasinghe Premadasa, Sri Lanka statesman, 3rd President of Sri Lanka (d. 1993)
  - Jerry Rullo, American professional basketball player (d. 2016)
  - Giuseppina Tuissi, Italian Resistance fighter (d. 1945)
- June 24
  - Yves Bonnefoy, French poet, art historian (d. 2016)
  - Cesare Romiti, Italian economist (d. 2020)
  - T-Model Ford, African-American blues musician (d. 2013)
- June 25
  - Jamshid Amouzegar, 43rd Prime Minister of Iran (d. 2016)
  - Doug Everingham, Australian politician, minister (d. 2017)
  - Sam Francis, American painter (d. 1994)
  - Vatroslav Mimica, Croatian film director, screenwriter (d. 2020)
- June 26 – Ed Bearss, American military historian and author (d. 2020)
- June 27
  - Beth Chatto, British plantswoman, garden designer and author (d. 2018)
  - Mitchell Flint, American lawyer, veteran aviator (d. 2017)
  - Gus Zernial, American baseball player, sports commentator (d. 2011)
- June 28
  - Giff Roux, American basketball player (d. 2011)
  - Gaye Stewart, Canadian ice hockey forward (d. 2010)
- June 29
  - Alfred Goodwin, senior judge on the United States Court of Appeals for the Ninth Circuit (d. 2022)
  - Olav Thon, Norwegian real estate magnate (d. 2024)
  - Chou Wen-chung, Chinese-American composer, educator (d. 2019)
- June 30 – Ivo Orlandi, Venezuelan sports shooter (d. 2000)

=== July ===
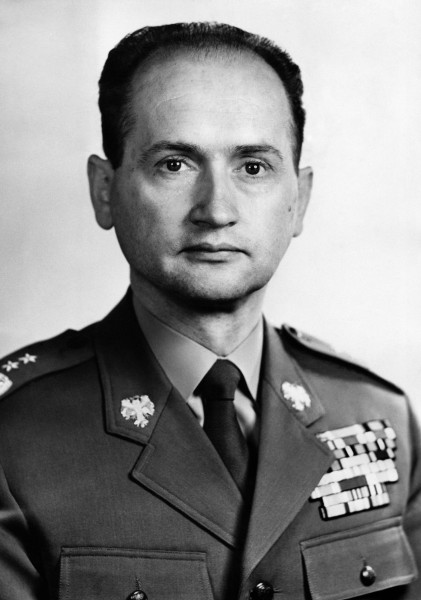
Wojciech Jaruzelski

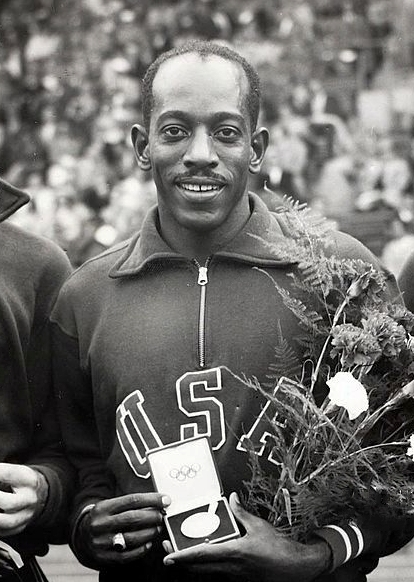
Harrison Dillard

- July 1
  - Scotty Bowers, American marine, author (d. 2019)
  - Herman Chernoff, American applied mathematician, statistician and physicist (d. 2026)
- July 2
  - Constantin Dăscălescu, 52nd Prime Minister of Romania (d. 2003)
  - Wisława Szymborska, Polish writer, Nobel Prize laureate (d. 2012)
- July 3
  - Hugo Machado, Uruguayan cyclist (d. 2015)
  - Felipe Zetter, Mexican football defender (d. 2013)
- July 4
  - Rudolf Friedrich, Swiss Federal Councilor (d. 2013)
  - George Mostow, American mathematician, renowned for his contributions to Lie theory (d. 2017)
- July 5 – Hermann Gummel, German semiconductor industry pioneer (d. 2022)
- July 6 – Wojciech Jaruzelski, Polish Communist politician, 8th Prime Minister of Poland and President of Poland (d. 2014)
- July 7
  - Leonardo Ferrel, Bolivian football player (d. 2013)
  - Whitney North Seymour Jr., American administrator (d. 2019)
  - Kitty White, American jazz singer (d. 2009)
- July 8 – Harrison Dillard, African-American track and field athlete (d. 2019)
- July 10
  - Amalia Mendoza, Mexican singer and actress (d. 2001)
  - John Bradley, U.S. Navy flag raiser on Iwo Jima (d. 1994)
- July 11
  - Olavo Rodrigues Barbosa, Brazilian football player (d. 2010)
  - Gilbert Morand, French non-commissioned officer, skier (d. 2008)
  - Roy Neighbors, American politician (d. 2017)
  - Richard Pipes, Polish-American academic who specialized in Russian history (d. 2018)
- July 12
  - Francisco Castro, Puerto Rican long jumper, triple jumper (d. 2008)
  - Freddie Fields, American theatrical agent, film producer (d. 2007)
  - James E. Gunn, American science fiction writer, editor, scholar, and anthologist (d. 2020)
- July 13
  - Alexandre Astruc, French film critic, director (d. 2016)
  - Shmuel Laviv-Lubin, Israeli sports shooter (d. 2012)
  - Erich Lessing, Austrian photographer (d. 2018)
  - Norma Zimmer, American singer (d. 2011)
- July 14
  - María Martín, Spanish actress (d. 2014)
  - Dale Robertson, American actor (d. 2013)
- July 16
  - Chris Argyris, American business theorist (d. 2013)
  - Mari Evans, African-American poet (d. 2017)
  - Giuseppe Madini, Italian professional football player (d. 1998)
  - Len Okrie, American catcher (d. 2018)
- July 18
  - Jerome H. Lemelson, American inventor (d. 1997)
  - Odvar Omland, Norwegian politician (d. 2025)
- July 20
  - Stanisław Albinowski, Polish economist, journalist (d. 2005)
  - Elisabeth Becker, German Nazi war criminal (d. 1946)
  - James Bree, British actor (d. 2008)
- July 21
  - Walter Brenner, American academic (d. 2017)
  - Rudolph A. Marcus, Canadian chemist, Nobel Prize laureate (d. 2026)
- July 22
  - Bob Dole, American Republican politician, presidential candidate (d. 2021)
  - Anthony Enahoro, Nigerian politician (d. 2010)
  - Mukesh, Indian singer (d. 1976)
  - The Fabulous Moolah, American professional wrestler (d. 2007)
- July 23
  - Witto Aloma, Cuban Major League Baseball player (d. 1997)
  - Morris Halle, Latvian-American linguist (d. 2018)
- July 24 – Albert Vanhoye, French cardinal (d. 2021)
- July 25 – Estelle Getty, American actress (d. 2008)
- July 29
  - Edgar Cortright, American scientist, engineer (d. 2014)
  - Jim Marshall, British founder of Marshall Amplification (d. 2012)
- July 31
  - Stephanie Kwolek, American chemist noted for inventing Kevlar (d. 2014)
  - Jean-Jacques Moreau, French mathematician, mechanician (d. 2014)

=== August ===
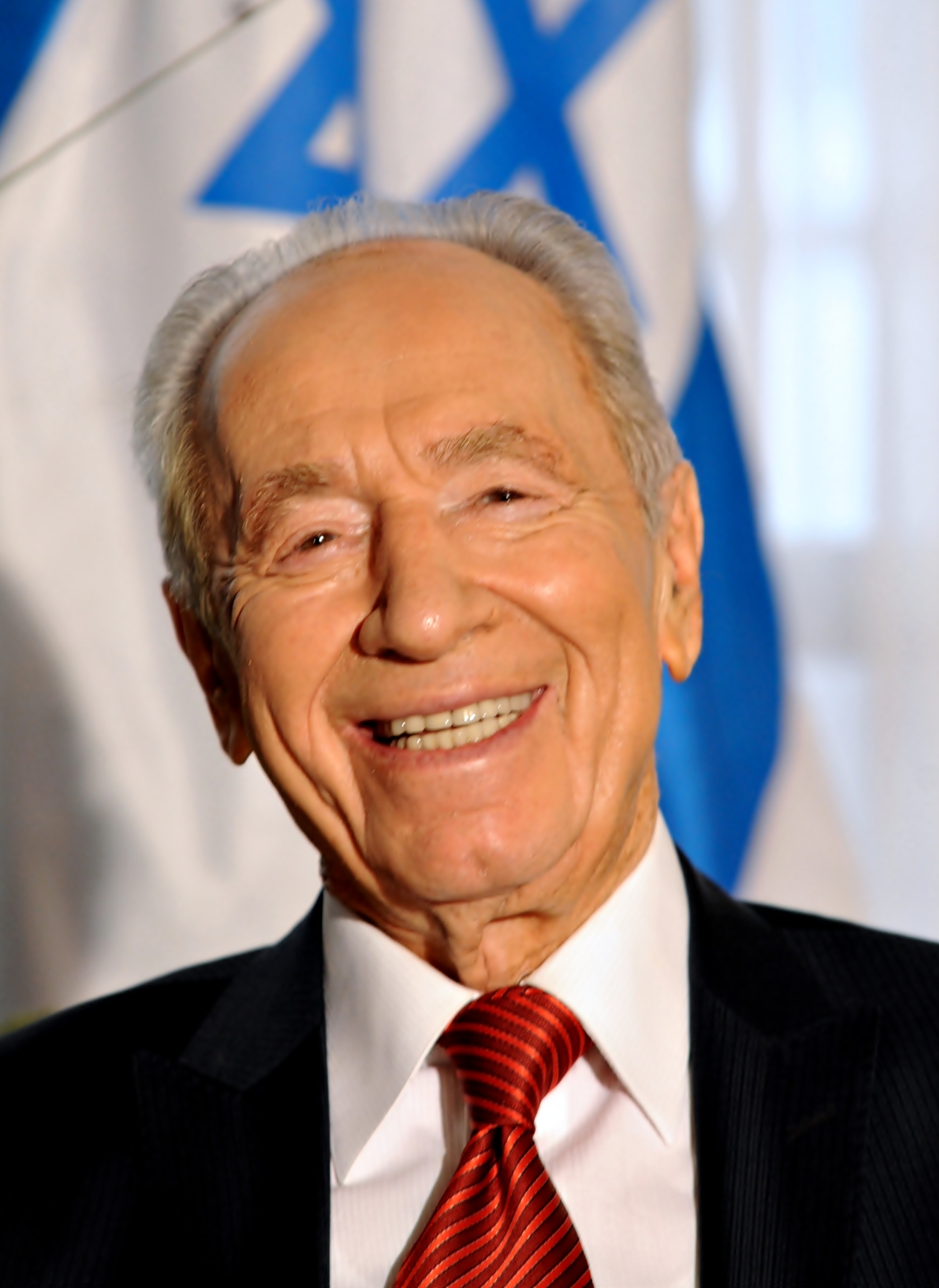
Shimon Peres

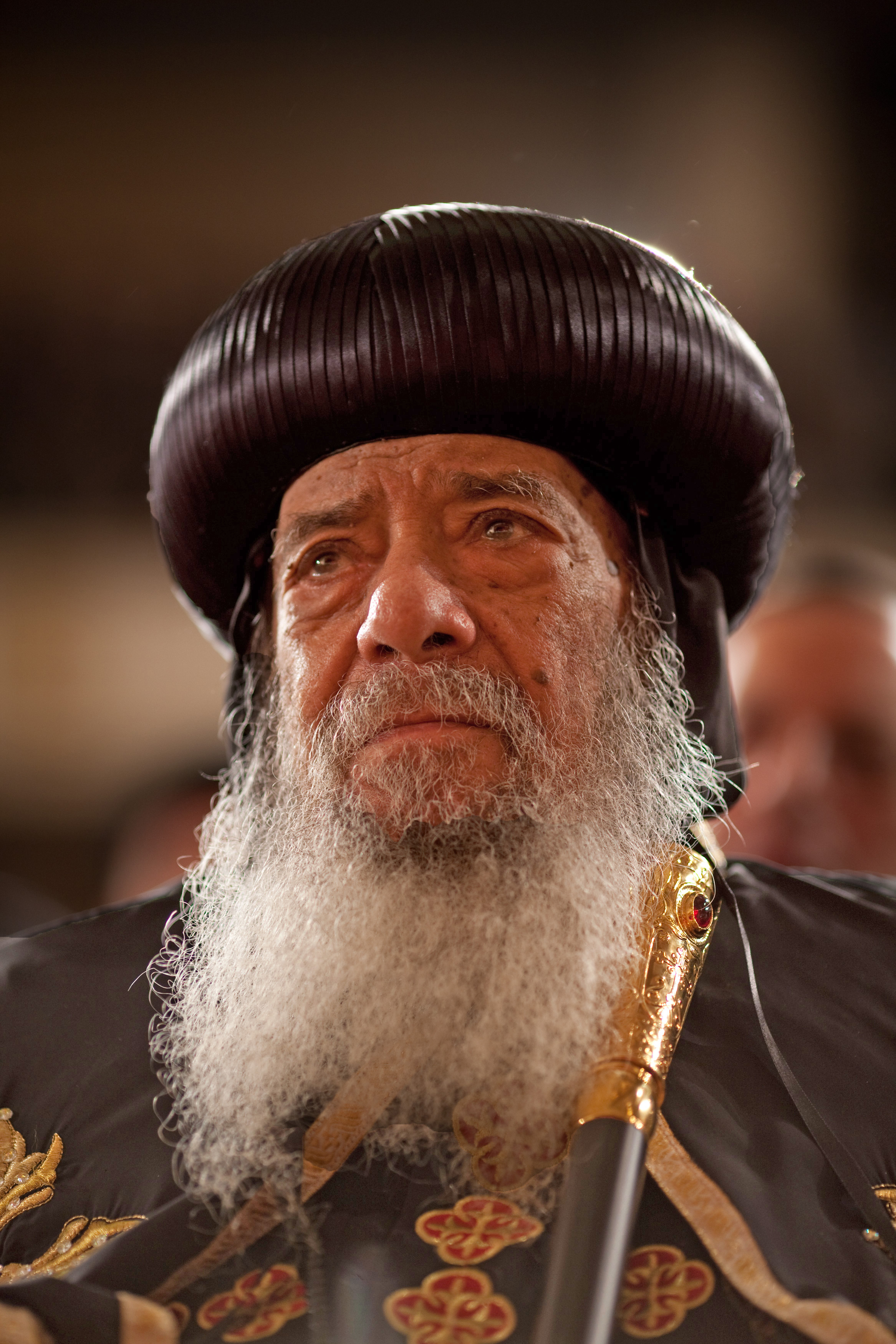
Pope Shenouda III of Alexandria

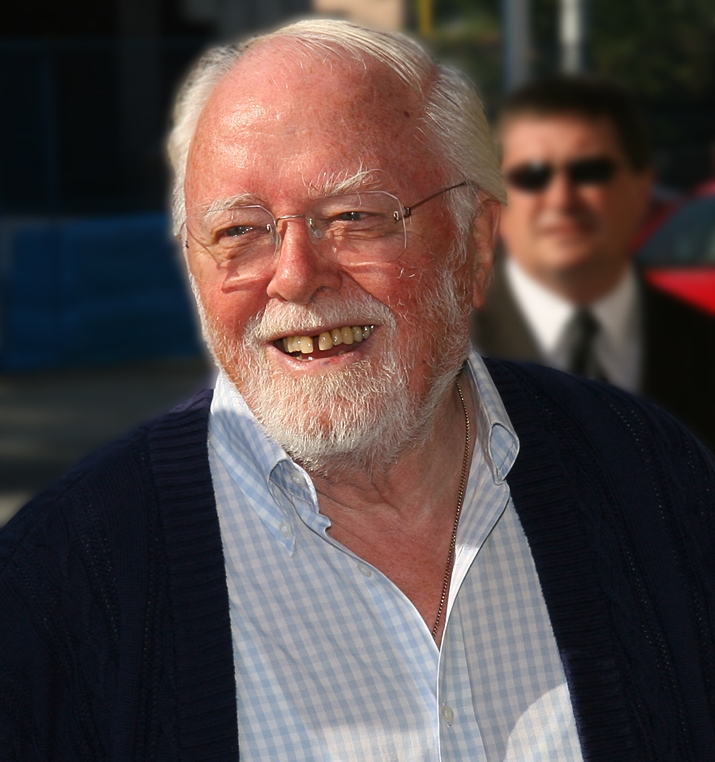
Richard Attenborough

- August 2
  - Shimon Peres, 8th Prime Minister of Israel, 9th President of Israel, recipient of the Nobel Peace Prize (d. 2016)
  - Charlie Wells, American crime novelist (d. 2004)
  - Ike Williams, American boxer (d. 1994)
- August 3
  - Jean Hagen, American actress (d. 1977)
  - Anne Klein, American fashion designer (d. 1974)
  - Pope Shenouda III of Alexandria, Pope of the Coptic Orthodox Church of Alexandria (d. 2012)
- August 4
  - Cornelia Groefsema Kennedy, American judge (d. 2014)
  - Santiago Omar Riveros, Argentine general (d. 2024)
  - Franz Karl Stanzel, Austrian literary theorist (d. 2023)
- August 5
  - Sir Michael Kerry, QC, British civil servant, Procurator General and Treasury Solicitor (d. 2012)
  - Devan Nair, third President of Singapore (d. 2005)
- August 6
  - John Dunmore, New Zealand academic, historian and author (d. 2023)
  - Paul Hellyer, Canadian engineer, politician (d. 2021)
  - Moira Lister, Anglo-South African film, stage and television actress (d. 2007)
  - Jack Parnell, English producer, bandleader and musician (d. 2010)
- August 7 – Ramesh Mehta, Indian playwright, director and actor (d. 2012)
- August 8
  - Eve Miller, American actress (d. 1973)
  - Latifa al-Zayyat, Egyptian activist, writer (d. 1996)
- August 9 – John Stephenson, American actor and voice actor (d. 2015)
- August 10
  - Iosif Fabian, Romanian football striker, coach (d. 2008)
  - Rhonda Fleming, American actress (d. 2020)
  - Fred Ridgway, English cricketer (d. 2015)
  - David H. Rodgers, American politician (d. 2017)
- August 11
  - Jeanne Bisgood, English golfer (d. 2024)
  - Roy Roper, New Zealand rugby player (d. 2023)
- August 12
  - Ruth Stiles Gannett, American children's writer (d. 2024)
  - Carlo Smuraglia, Italian politician and partisan (d. 2022)
- August 14
  - Kuldip Nayar, Indian journalist, human rights activist and politician (d. 2018)
  - Ivan Uzlov, Soviet-born Ukrainian scientist and metallurgist (d. 2022)
- August 15
  - Enver Mamedov, Soviet diplomat and media manager (d. 2023)
  - Rose Marie, American actress, comedian, and singer (d. 2017)
- August 16
  - Francisco de Andrade, Portuguese competitive sailor, Olympic medalist (d. 2021)
  - Millôr Fernandes, Brazilian cartoonist, playwright (d. 2012)
- August 17 – Carlos Cruz-Diez, Venezuelan artist (d. 2019)
- August 19 – Esmeralda Agoglia, Argentinian ballerina (d. 2014)
- August 20
  - Jim Reeves, American country singer (d. 1964)
  - Arthur Upton, South African cricketer (d. 2015)
- August 21 – Larry Grayson, English comedian, game show host (d. 1995)
- August 22
  - Guenter Lewy, German-born American author and political scientist (d. 2026)
  - Aldo Scavarda, Italian cinematographer (d. unknown)
  - Carolina Slim, American Piedmont blues singer, guitarist (d. 1953)
- August 23
  - Siti Hartinah, 2nd First Lady of Indonesia, wife of Suharto (d. 1996)
  - Artturi Niemelä, Finnish homesteader and politician (d. 2021)
  - Henry F. Warner, American soldier, Medal of Honor recipient (d. 1944)
  - Balram Jakhar, Indian politician (d. 2016)
- August 24
  - Eddie Deerfield, American government official (d. 2022)
  - Arthur Jensen, American educational psychologist (d. 2012)
- August 25 – Luis Abanto Morales, Peruvian singer, composer (d. 2017)
- August 26
  - N. A. Ramaiah, Indian physical chemist
  - Wolfgang Sawallisch, German conductor, pianist (d. 2013)
- August 27
  - Inge Egger, Austrian actress (d. 1976)
  - Hun Neang, father of Cambodian Prime Minister Hun Sen (d. 2013)
- August 28
  - Arthur Payne, Australian speedway rider (d. 2025)
  - Andrea Veggio, Italian Roman Catholic bishop (d. 2020)
- August 29
  - Sir Richard Attenborough, English actor, film director (d. 2014)
  - Maurizio Bucci, Italian diplomat
  - Ashi Tashi Dorji, Bhutanese royal
  - Marmaduke Hussey, Baron Hussey of North Bradley, chairman of the BBC (d. 2006)
- August 30
  - Joseph Lawson Howze, American Roman Catholic bishop (d. 2019)
  - Giacomo Rondinella, Italian singer, actor (d. 2015)
  - Vic Seixas, American tennis player (d. 2024)
- August 31 – Emilinha Borba, popular Brazilian singer (d. 2005)

=== September ===
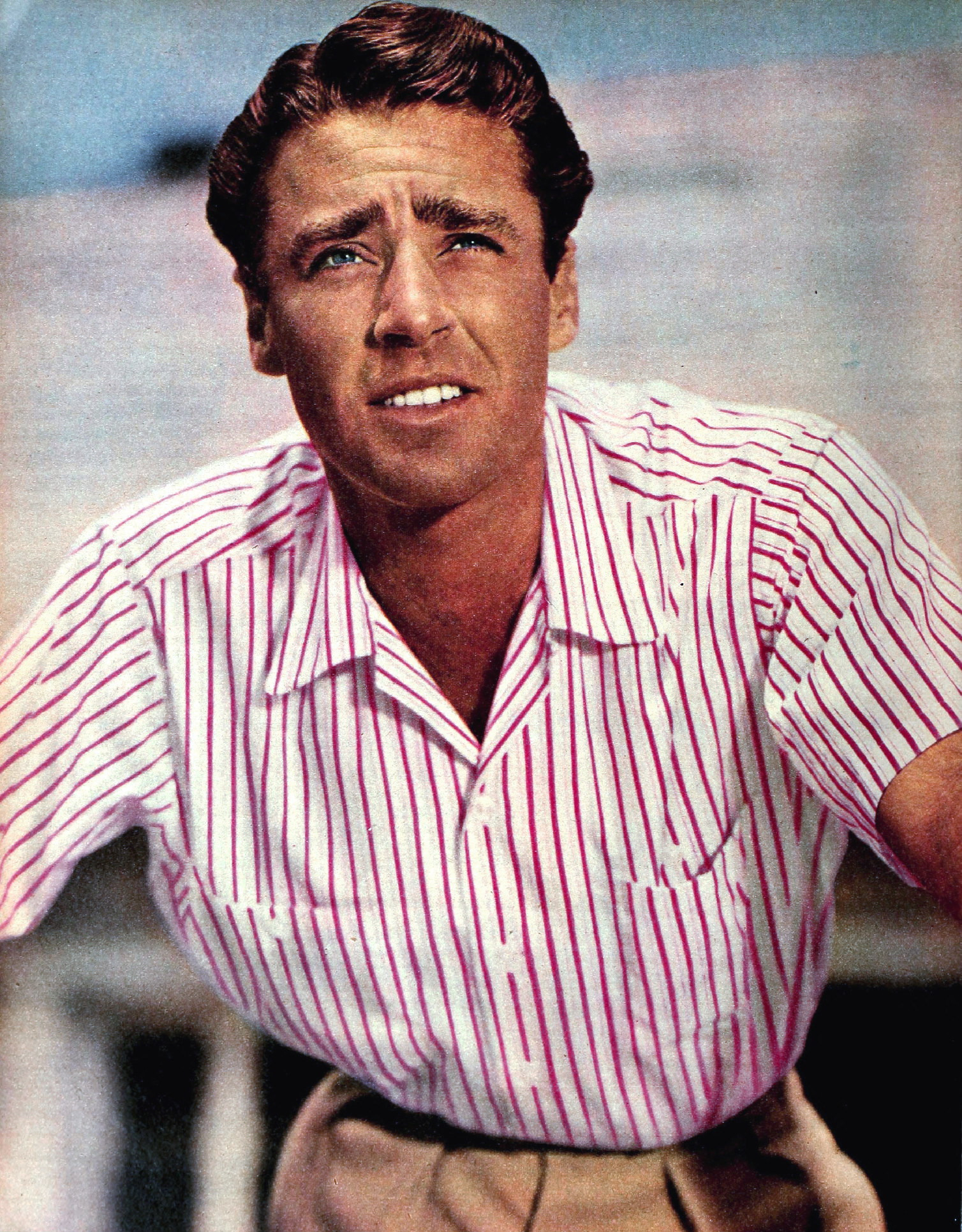
Peter Lawford

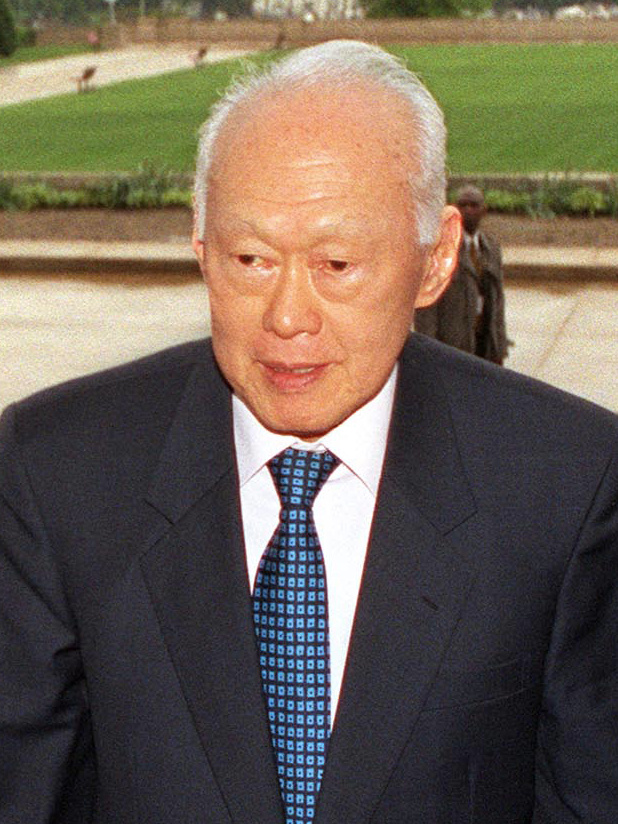
Lee Kuan Yew

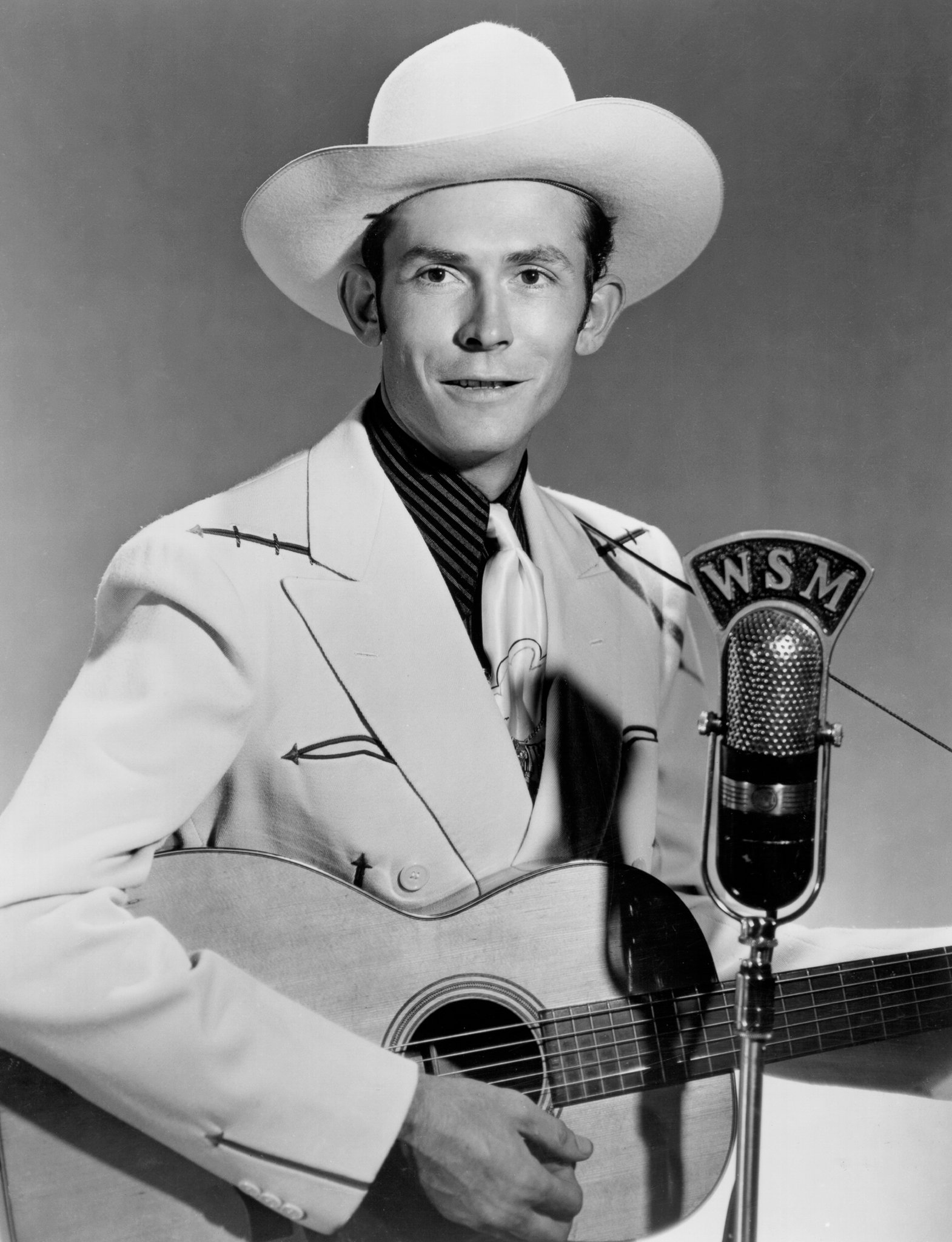
Hank Williams

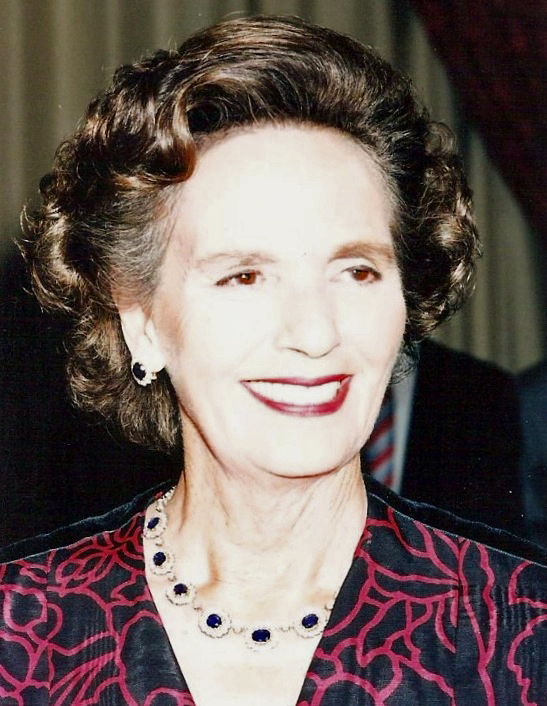
Queen Anne of Romania

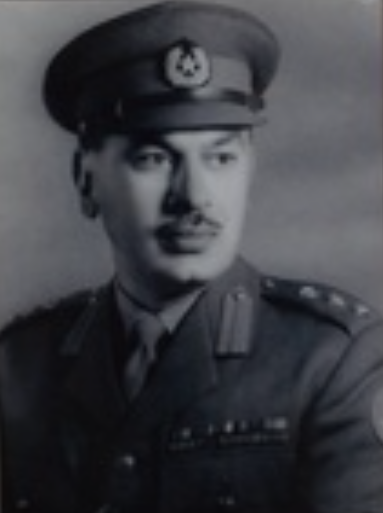
Agha Ibrahim Akram

- September 1
  - Rocky Marciano, American boxer (d. 1969)
  - Tunku Ampuan Najihah, Queen consort of Malaysia (d. 2023)
  - Kenneth Thomson, Canadian businessman, art collector (d. 2006)
- September 3
  - Glen Bell, American entrepreneur, founder of Taco Bell (d. 2010)
  - Mort Walker, American cartoonist, creator of Beetle Bailey (d. 2018)
- September 4
  - Mirko Ellis, Swiss-Italian actor (d. 2014)
  - Ram Kishore Shukla, Indian politician (d. 2003)
  - Mushtaq Ahmad Yusufi, Pakistani banker, writer and humorist (d. 2018)
- September 5 – Aileen Adams, English consultant anaesthetist
- September 6
  - Eloy Tato Losada, Spanish Roman Catholic bishop (d. 2022)
  - King Peter II of Yugoslavia (d. 1970)
- September 7
  - Madeleine Dring, British composer, actress (d. 1977)
  - Peter Lawford, English actor (d. 1984)
  - Bill Nankivell, Australian politician (d. 2024)
- September 8
  - Joy Laville, English-Mexican sculptor, potter and painter (d. 2018)
  - Eleanor Vadala, American chemist, materials engineer and balloonist (d. 2023)
- September 9
  - Daniel Carleton Gajdusek, American virologist, recipient of the Nobel Prize in Physiology or Medicine (d. 2008)
  - Cliff Robertson, American actor (d. 2011)
  - Charles Grier Sellers, American historian (d. 2021)
  - Marcel Zanini, Turkish-born French jazz musician (d. 2023)
- September 10
  - Uri Avnery, Israeli writer (d. 2018)
  - Joe Wallach, American businessman (d. 2026)
- September 11
  - Vasilije Mokranjac, Serbian composer (d. 1984)
  - Harry D. Schultz, American investment adviser and author (d. 2023)
- September 12 – Joe Shulman, American jazz bassist (d. 1957)
- September 13
  - Natália Correia, Portuguese writer, poet and social activist (d. 1993)
  - U. L. Gooch, American politician (d. 2021)
  - Zoya Kosmodemyanskaya, Soviet partisan (d. 1941)
- September 14 – Carl-Erik Asplund, Swedish speed skater (d. 2024)
- September 15 – Audrey Stuckes, English material scientist (d. 2006)
- September 16 – Lee Kuan Yew, Prime Minister of Singapore (d. 2015)
- September 17
  - David Oreck, American entrepreneur (d. 2023)
  - Hank Williams, American country musician (d. 1953)
- September 18
  - Queen Anne of Romania, born Princess Anne of Bourbon-Parma, French-born queen consort (d. 2016)
  - Al Quie, American politician (d. 2023)
- September 20 – Geraldine Clinton Little, Northern Ireland-born poet (d. 1997)
- September 21
  - Carol Berman, American politician (d. 2023)
  - Linwood Holton, American politician (d. 2021)
  - Luba Skořepová, Czech actress (d. 2016)
- September 22
  - Dannie Abse, Welsh poet (d. 2014)
  - Agha Ibrahim Akram, Pakistani general (d. 1989)
- September 23
  - Anita Cornwell, American lesbian feminist author (d. 2023)
  - Basil Feldman, Baron Feldman, English politician (d. 2019)
  - Eberhard W. Kornfeld, Swiss auctioneer and art collector (d. 2023)
  - Maybell Lebron, Argentine-born Paraguayan writer
  - Socorro Ramos, Filipino entrepreneur
  - Shubert Spero, American rabbi
  - Jimmy Weldon, American voice actor and ventriloquist (d. 2023)
  - Samuel V. Wilson, American army general (d. 2017)
- September 24
  - Mervyn Brown, British diplomat and historian (d. 2023)
  - Fats Navarro, American jazz trumpet player (d. 1950)
  - Li Yuan-tsu, Taiwanese politician (d. 2017)
- September 26
  - Aleksandr Alov, Soviet film director, screenwriter (d. 1983)
  - Dev Anand, Indian actor, film producer, writer and director (d. 2011)
  - James Hennessy, English businessman and diplomat (d. 2024)
- September 27
  - James Condon, Australian actor (d. 2014)
  - George Dickson, American football player (d. 2020)
- September 28
  - Giuseppe Casale, Italian Roman Catholic bishop (d. 2023)
  - Roedad Khan, Pakistani politician and civil servant (d. 2024)
- September 29 – Nicholas Amer, English actor (d. 2019)
- September 30
  - Norman C. Gaddis, American Air Force officer and fighter pilot (d. 2024)
  - Thérèse Gouin Décarie, Canadian developmental psychologist and educator (d. 2024)
  - Donald Swann, Welsh musician and composer (d. 1994)

=== October ===
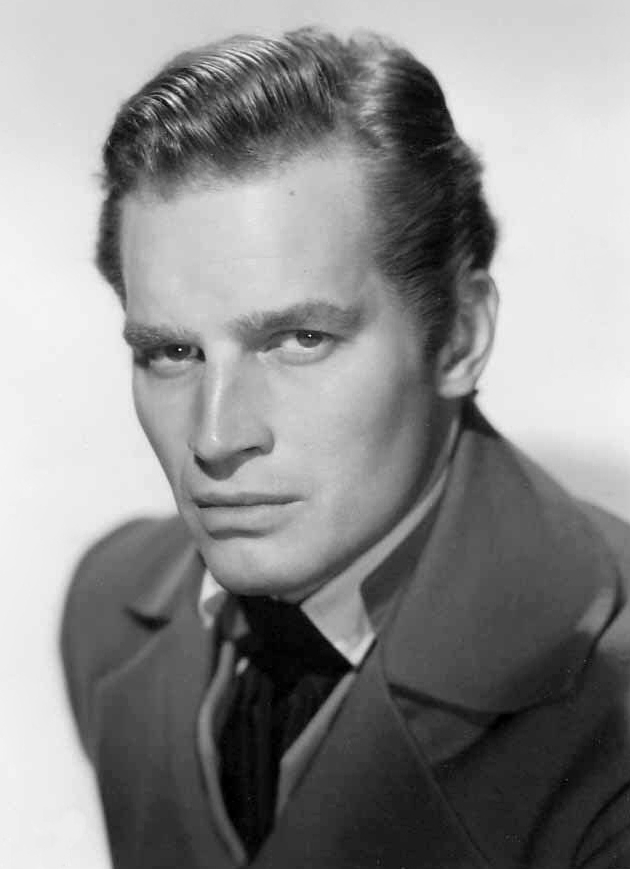
Charlton Heston

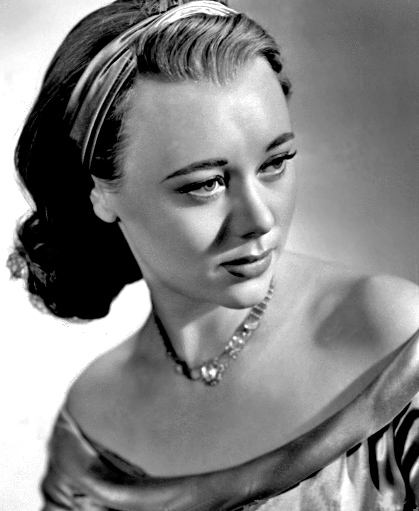
Glynis Johns

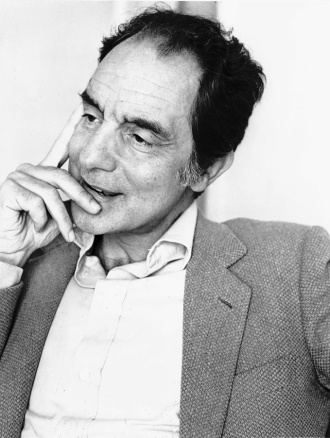
Italo Calvino

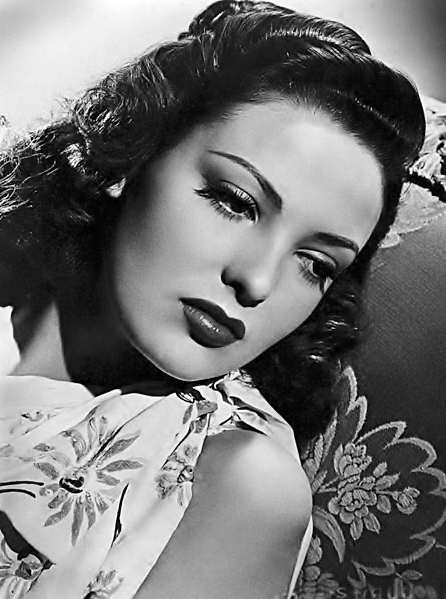
Linda Darnell

- October 1
  - Babe McCarthy, American professional and collegiate basketball coach (d. 1975)
  - Mary Morello, American anti-censorship activist (d. 2026)
  - Kim Yaroshevskaya, Russian-born Canadian actress (d. 2025)
- October 2
  - Abdullah CD, Malaysian politician (d. 2024)
  - Shih Chun-jen, Taiwanese neurosurgeon (d. 2017)
  - Absalón Castellanos Domínguez, Mexican politician (d. 2017)
  - Judith Hemmendinger, German-born Israeli researcher and author (d. 2024)
  - Eugenio Cruz Vargas, Chilean poet, painter (d. 2014)
  - Hershel W. Williams, American Medal of Honour recipient (d. 2022)
- October 3
  - Edward Oliver LeBlanc, Dominican politician (d. 2004)
  - Stanisław Skrowaczewski, Polish-born orchestral conductor (d. 2017)
- October 4 – Charlton Heston, American actor (The Ten Commandments) (d. 2008)
- October 5
  - Albert Guðmundsson, Icelandic football player, politician (d. 1994)
  - Glynis Johns, South African-born Welsh actress (d. 2024)
  - Ricardo Lavié, Argentine actor (d. 2010)
  - Stig Dagerman, Swedish writer (d. 1954)
- October 6
  - Odile Croissant, French biologist, physicist, specialist in electron microscopy (d. 2020)
  - Yasar Kemal, Turkish writer (d. 2015)
  - Robert Kuok, Malaysian-Chinese business magnate, investor
  - Yakov Neishtadt, Russian-born Israeli chess player (d. 2023)
  - Emmett Hulcy Tidd, American military officer (d. 2018)
- October 7 – Irma Grese, German Nazi concentration camp guard, war criminal (executed 1945)
- October 9
  - Helen Corey, American cookbook author and educator (d. 2024)
  - Haim Gouri, Israeli poet (d. 2018)
  - Keshub Mahindra, Indian businessman (d. 2023)
  - V. P. Appukutta Poduval, Indian independence activist
- October 10
  - James "Jabby" Jabara, American aviator, first American jet fighter ace (d. 1966)
  - Asri Muda, Malaysian politician (d. 1992)
  - Nicholas Parsons, English television and radio presenter (d. 2020)
  - Murray Walker, British motor racing commentator (d. 2021)
- October 13
  - Harry Pregerson, American federal judge (d. 2017)
  - Faas Wilkes, Dutch football (soccer) player (d. 2006)
- October 15
  - Italo Calvino, Italian writer (d. 1985)
  - Bettina Moissi, German actress (d. 2023)
- October 16 – Linda Darnell, American actress (d. 1965)
- October 17
  - Henryk Gulbinowicz, Polish cardinal (d. 2020)
  - Charles McClendon, American Hall of Fame college football coach (d. 2001)
- October 18 – Eileen Sheridan, English cyclist (d. 2023)
- October 19 – Beatrix Hamburg, American psychiatrist (d. 2018)
- October 20
  - V. S. Achuthanandan, Indian politician (d. 2025)
  - Marc Clark, English-born Australian sculptor (d. 2021)
  - Jacqueline Ficini, French researcher, professor of chemistry (d. 1988)
  - Otfried Preußler, German children's books author (d. 2013)
- October 23
  - John Meisel, Canadian political scientist, professor and scholar (d. 2025)
  - Ned Rorem, American composer and author (d. 2022)
  - Frank Sutton, American actor (d. 1974)
  - Julia Wipplinger, South African tennis player
- October 24
  - Sir Robin Day, British political broadcaster (d. 2000)
  - Denise Levertov, British-born American poet (d. 1997)
- October 25
  - J. Esmonde Barry, Canadian healthcare activist, political commentator (d. 2007)
  - Achille Silvestrini, Italian cardinal (d. 2019)
- October 27
  - Dorothy Kloss, American dancer (d. 2026)
  - Roy Lichtenstein, American pop artist (d. 1997)
- October 29
  - Vincent Cyril Richard Arthur Charles Crabbe, Ghanaian judge (d. 2018)
  - Carl Djerassi, American chemist (d. 2015)
  - Gerda van der Kade-Koudijs, Dutch athlete (d. 2015)

=== November ===
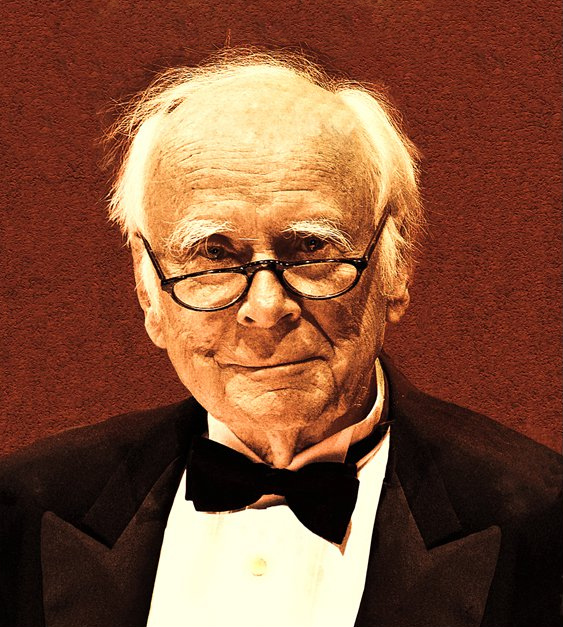
Loriot

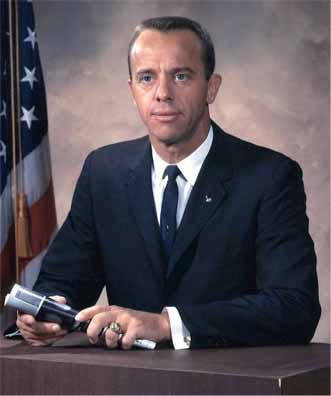
Alan Shepard

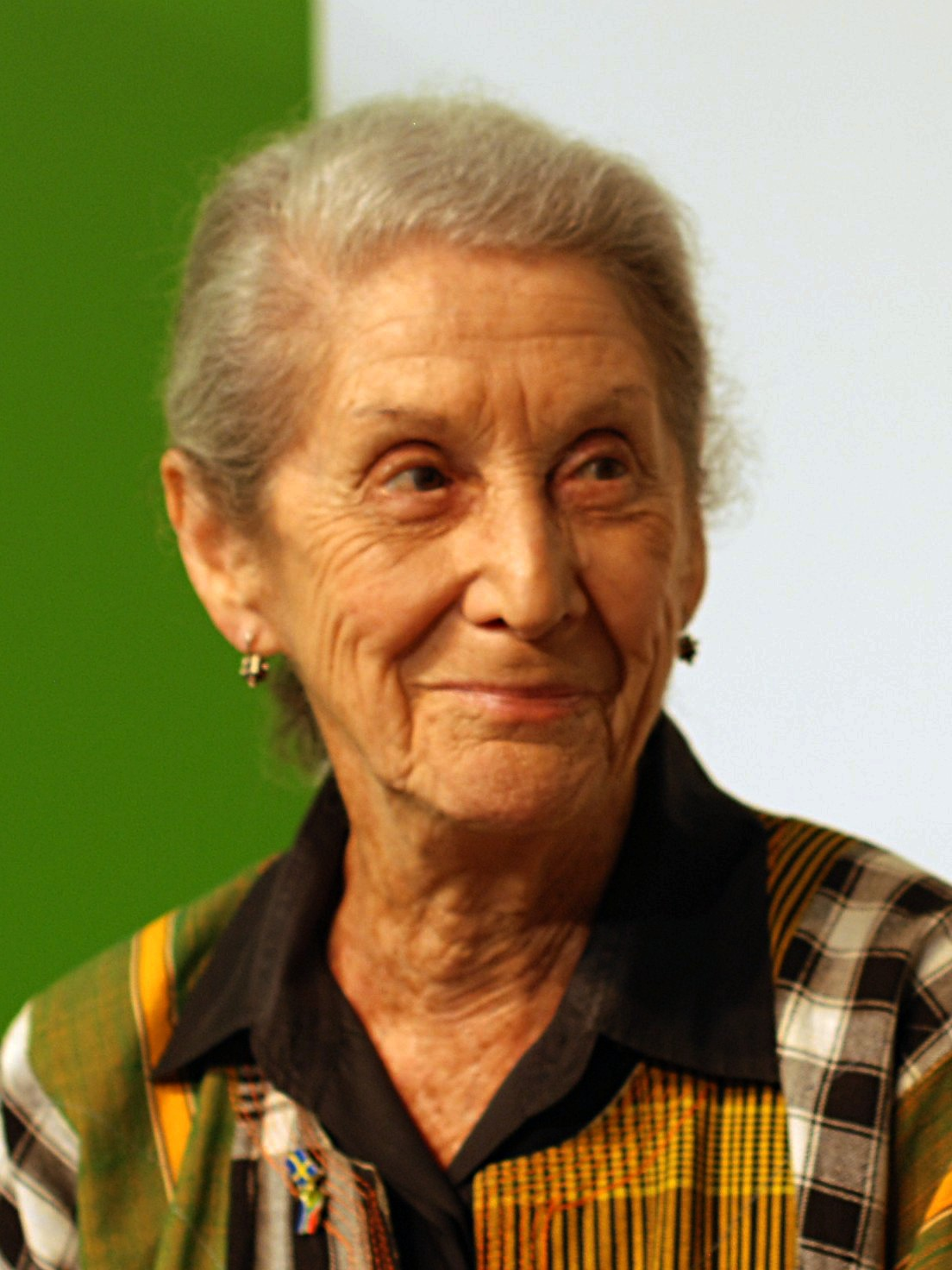
Nadine Gordimer

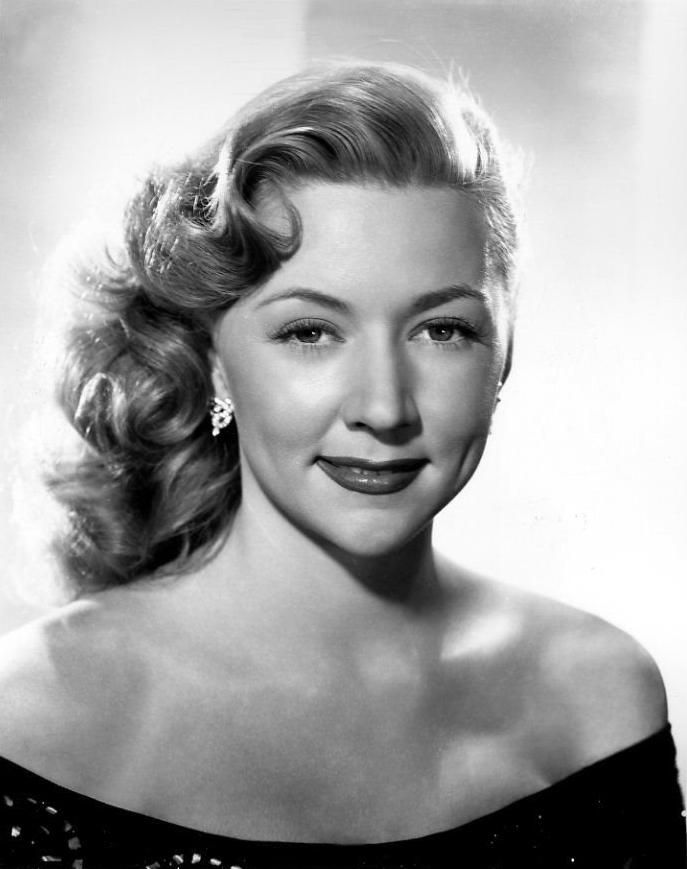
Gloria Grahame

- November 1
  - Victoria de los Ángeles, Catalan soprano (d. 2005)
  - Gordon R. Dickson, Canadian author (d. 2001)
  - James Ramsden, English politician (d. 2020)
  - Imre Varga, Hungarian sculptor (d. 2019)
- November 2
  - Henry Moore, English bishop (d. 2025)
  - Cesare Rubini, Italian basketball player, coach (d. 2011)
  - Ida Vitale, Uruguayan translator, author and literary critic
- November 3
  - Garnett Thomas Eisele, American district court judge (d. 2017)
  - Violetta Elvin, née Prokhorova, Russian-born ballerina (d. 2021)
  - Charles Nolte, American actor, director, playwright and educator (d. 2010)
  - Tomás Cardinal Ó Fiaich, Irish Roman Catholic prelate (d. 1990)
  - Giovanni Battista Urbani, Italian politician (d. 2018)
- November 4
  - John Herbers, American journalist, author, editor, World War II veteran and Pulitzer Prize finalist (d. 2017)
  - Howie Meeker, Canadian ice hockey player and politician (d. 2020)
  - Guillermo Rodríguez, 31st President of Ecuador
- November 5
  - Rudolf Augstein, German journalist, founder and part-owner of magazine Der Spiegel (d. 2002)
  - Kay Lionikas, Greek-American female baseball player (d. 1978)
  - Aiko Satō, Japanese novelist (d. 2026)
- November 6 – Nizoramo Zaripova, Soviet politician and women's rights activist (d. 2024)
- November 8
  - Józef Hen, Polish writer
  - Jack Kilby, American electrical engineer, recipient of the Nobel Prize in Physics (d. 2005)
  - Jaroslav Šír, Czechoslovak soldier and skier
- November 9 – Elizabeth Hawley, American journalist (d. 2018)
- November 11
  - P. K. van der Byl, Rhodesian politician (d. 1999)
  - Isaac Trachtenberg, Soviet-born Ukrainian hygienist (d. 2023)
- November 12 – Loriot, German actor (d. 2011)
- November 13 – Linda Christian, Mexican film actress (d. 2011)
- November 14
  - Misael Pastrana Borrero, 23rd President of Colombia (d. 1997)
  - Cleyde Yáconis, Brazilian actress (d. 2013)
- November 17
  - Ruth W. Greenfield, American concert pianist and teacher (d. 2023)
  - Aristides Pereira, President of Cape Verde (d. 2011)
- November 18
  - Edith Graef McGeer, American-born Canadian neuroscientist (d. 2023)
  - Cornelis Ruhtenberg, American painter (d. 2008)
  - Alan Shepard, first American astronaut, fifth person to walk on the Moon (d. 1998)
  - Ted Stevens, American politician (d. 2010)
- November 20 – Nadine Gordimer, South African fiction writer, Nobel Prize laureate (d. 2014)
- November 22
  - Tu An, Chinese poet, translator (d. 2017)
  - Arthur Hiller, Canadian film director (d. 2016)
- November 23
  - Betty Brewer, American actress (d. 2006)
  - Eric Heath, New Zealand artist and illustrator (d. 2025)
  - Keiju Kobayashi, Japanese actor (d. 2010)
  - Gloria Whelan, American poet, short story writer and novelist
- November 24 – Octavio Lepage, Venezuelan politician, Acting President of Venezuela (d. 2017)
- November 25 – Mauno Koivisto, 2-Time Prime Minister of Finland and 9th President of Finland (d. 2017)
- November 26
  - Tom Hughes, Australian politician and barrister (d. 2024)
  - Pat Phoenix, English actress (d. 1986)
- November 28
  - Gloria Grahame, American actress (d. 1981)
  - James Karen, American actor (d. 2018)
- November 29 – Augusto Lauro, Italian prelate (d. 2023)

=== December ===
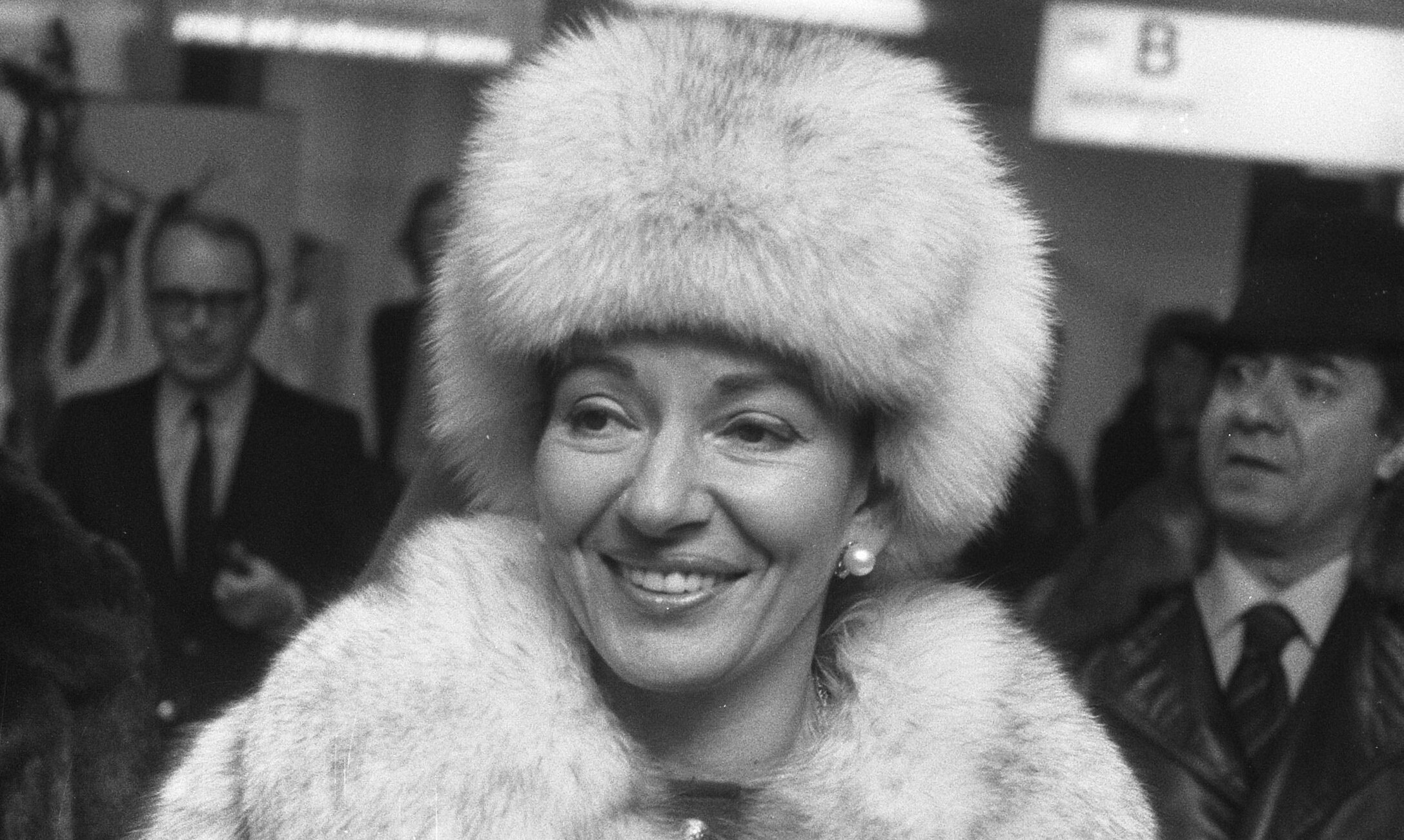
Maria Callas

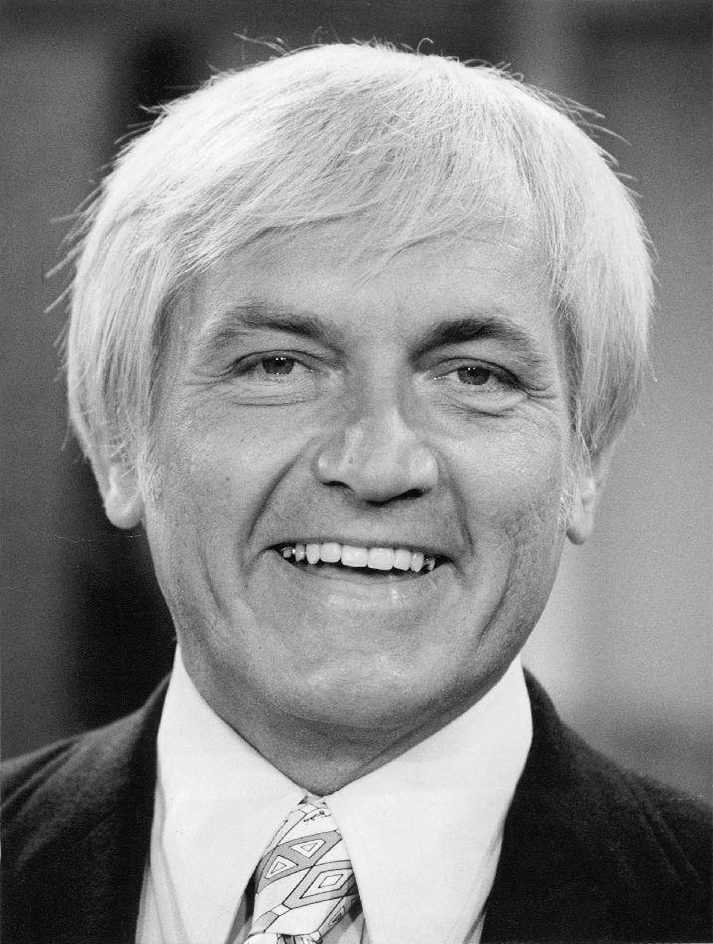
Ted Knight

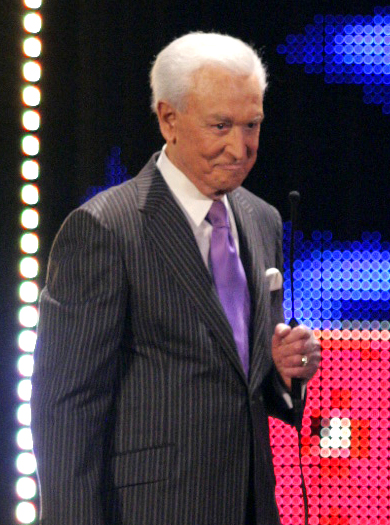
Bob Barker

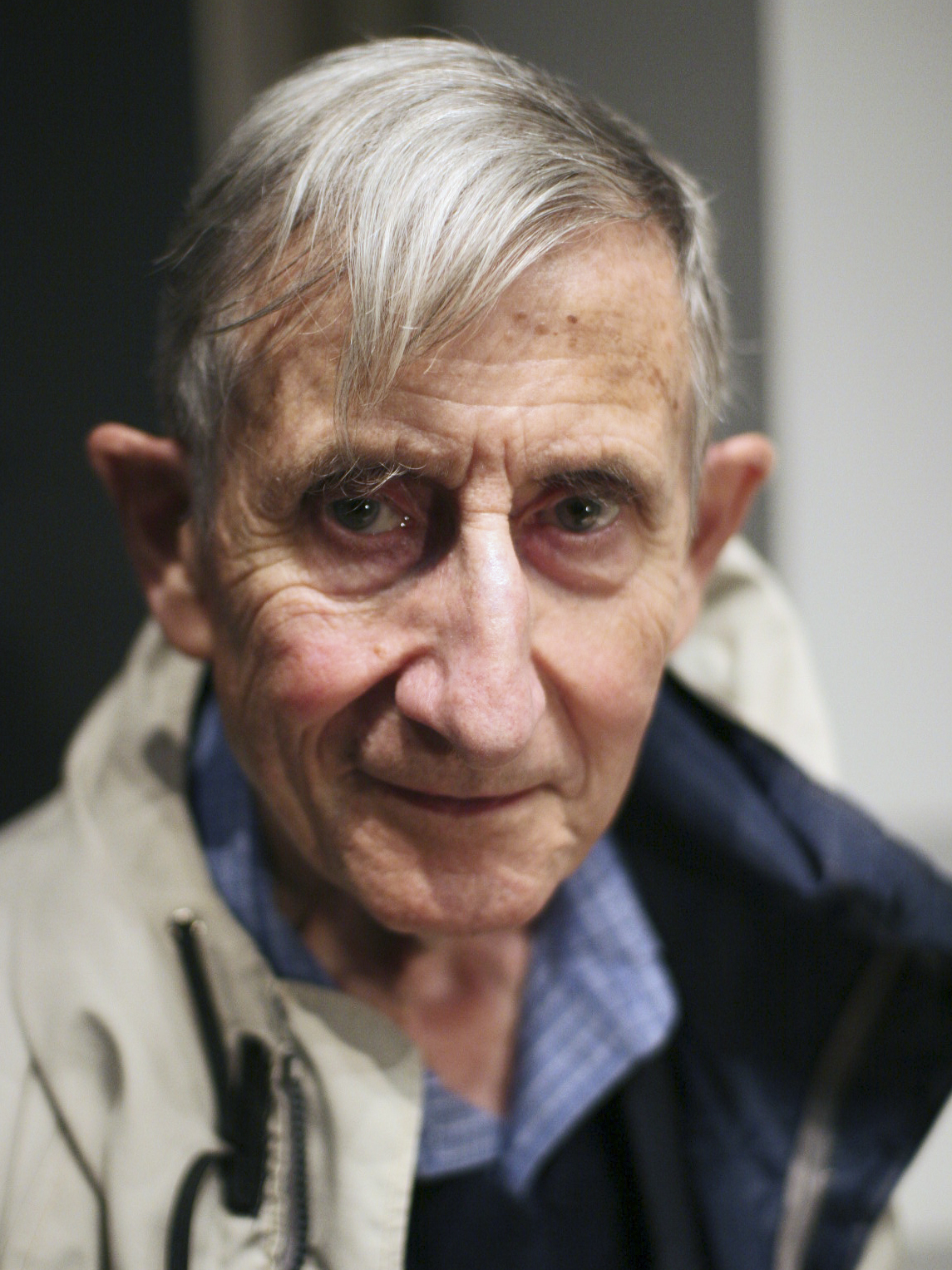
Freeman Dyson

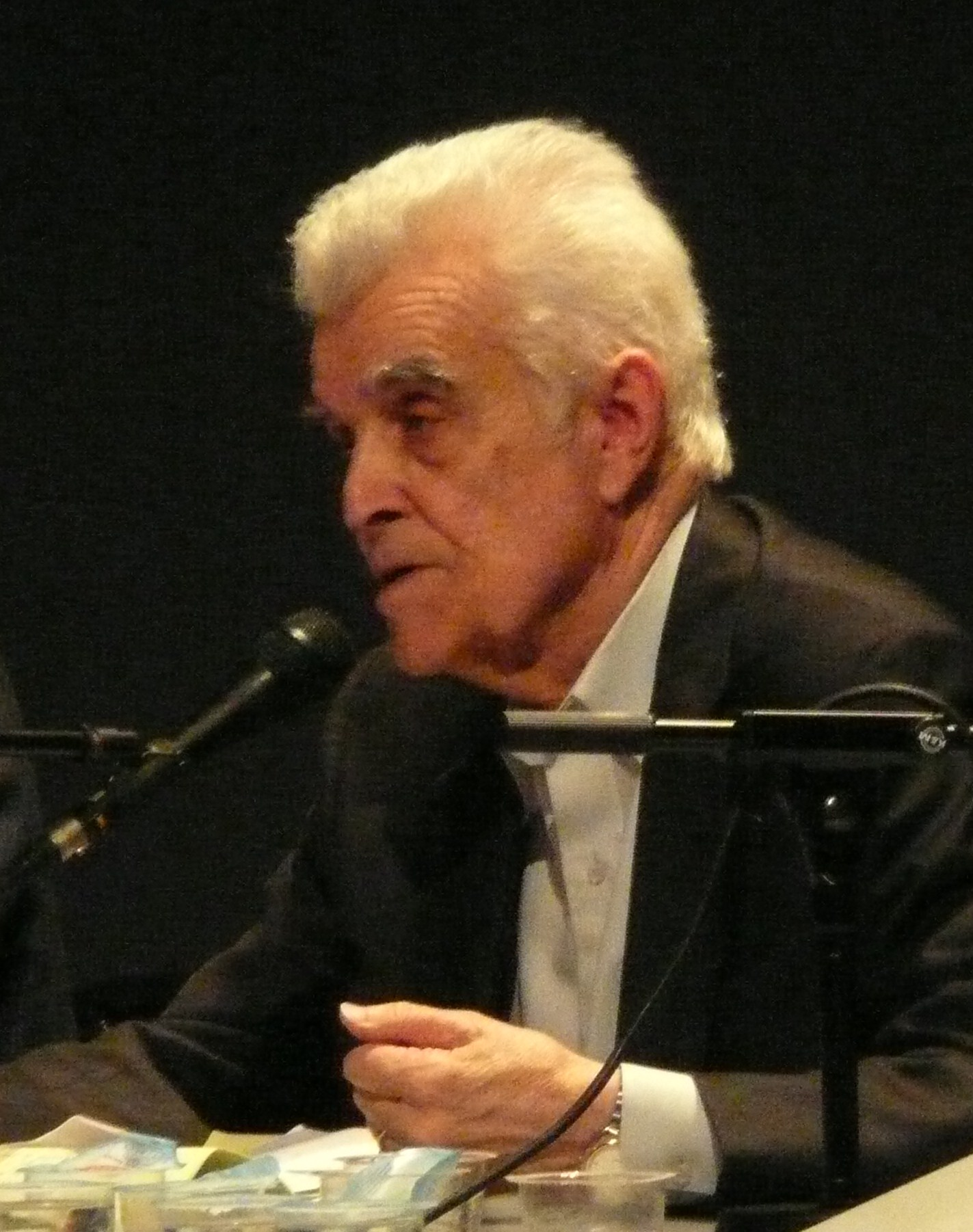
René Girard

- December 1
  - Maurice De Bevere, better known as Morris, Belgian cartoonist, comics artist and illustrator (d. 2001)
  - William F. House, American otologist, inventor of the Cochlear implant (d. 2012)
  - Stansfield Turner, American admiral, Director of Central Intelligence (d. 2018)
- December 2 – Maria Callas, Greek soprano (d. 1977)
- December 3
  - Dede Allen, American film editor (Bonnie and Clyde) (d. 2010)
  - Stjepan Bobek, Yugoslav footballer (d. 2010)
  - Moyra Fraser, British actress (d. 2009)
- December 5
  - Khosiat Boboeva, Tajikistani historian
  - Eleanor Dapkus, American female professional baseball player (d. 2011)
- December 6
  - Emile Hemmen, Luxembourg poet and writer (d. 2021)
  - Bryan Thwaites, English mathematician, educationalist and administrator
- December 7
  - Robert Geddes, American architect (d. 2023)
  - Ted Knight, American actor (d. 1986)
- December 8
  - Dewey Martin, American actor (d. 2018)
  - Rudolph Pariser, American physicist and polymer chemist (d. 2021)
- December 9
  - Jack M. Guttentag, American academic (d. 2024)
  - Elliot Valenstein, American psychologist and neuroscientist (d. 2023)
- December 10
  - Harold Gould, American character actor (d. 2010)
  - Abelardo Quinteros, Chilean composer
  - Meg Woolf, English artist (d. 2023)
- December 11
  - Betsy Blair, American film actress (d. 2009)
  - Denis Brian, Welsh journalist and author (d. 2017)
  - Farhang Mehr, Iranian-born American Zoroastrian scholar, writer (d. 2018)
- December 12
  - Bob Barker, American game show host (The Price Is Right) (d. 2023)
  - Bob Dorough, American pianist and composer (d. 2018)
  - Jacqueline Fleury, French resistance fighter
  - Emahoy Tsegué-Maryam Guèbrou, Ethiopian nun (d. 2023)
  - Ken Kavanagh, Australian motorcycle racer (d. 2019)
- December 13
  - Philip Warren Anderson, American physicist, Nobel Prize laureate (d. 2020)
  - Larry Doby, African-American baseball player (d. 2003)
  - Doireann MacDermott, Irish translator, writer and academic (d. 2024)
  - Alfonso Osorio, Spanish politician (d. 2018)
  - Antoni Tàpies, Catalan painter (d. 2012)
  - Herb Wilkinson, American basketball player (d. 2026)
- December 14
  - Sully Boyar, American actor (d. 2001)
  - Chris Ogunbanjo, Nigerian lawyer and philanthropist (d. 2023)
  - Gerard Reve, Dutch writer (d. 2006)
- December 15
  - Freeman Dyson, English-born physicist (d. 2020)
  - Aishah Ghani, Malaysian politician (d. 2013)
  - Viktor Shuvalov, Soviet ice hockey player (d. 2021)
- December 16
  - Jo-Carroll Dennison, American actress, Miss America (d. 2021)
  - Menahem Pressler, German-American pianist (d. 2023)
- December 17
  - Robert William Bradford, Canadian artist (d. 2023)
  - Jaroslav Pelikan, American historian (d. 2006)
- December 18 – Émile Knecht, Swiss Olympic rower (d. 2019)
- December 20 – Ambalavaner Sivanandan, Sri Lankan novelist (d. 2018)
- December 21 – Wat Misaka, American baseball player (d. 2019)
- December 23
  - José Serra Gil, Spanish racing cyclist (d. 2002)
  - Enrique Lucca, Venezuelan sports shooter (d. 2021)
  - James Stockdale, U.S. Navy admiral, vice presidential candidate (d. 2005)
- December 25
  - Luis Álamos, Chilean football manager (d. 1983)
  - René Girard, French-American historian (d. 2015)
  - Sonya Olschanezky, World War II heroine (d. 1944)
  - Satyananda Saraswati, Indian founder of Satyananda Yoga and Bihar Yoga (d. 2009)
- December 26
  - Richard Artschwager, American painter, illustrator and sculptor (d. 2013)
  - Dick Teague, American industrial designer (d. 1991)
- December 27 – Lucas Mangope, President of Bophuthatswana Bantustan (d. 2018)
- December 28
  - Louis Lansana Beavogui, Guinean politician (d. 1984)
  - Georg Hille, Norwegian clergyman (d. 2023)
  - Mira Sulpizi, Italian composer
- December 29
  - Yvonne Choquet-Bruhat, French mathematician and physicist (d. 2025)
  - Cheikh Anta Diop, Senegalese historian, anthropologist, physicist and politician (d. 1986)
  - Lily Ebert, Hungarian-born English Holocaust survivor (d. 2024)
  - David Teacher, British RAF veteran (d. 2024)
  - Dina Merrill, American actress, heiress, socialite and philanthropist (d. 2017)
  - Mike Nussbaum, American actor and director (d. 2023)
- December 30 – Carl-Göran Ekerwald, Swedish novelist, literary critic and teacher (d. 2025)
- December 31 – Balbir Singh Sr., Indian hockey player (d. 2020)

== Deaths ==
=== January ===
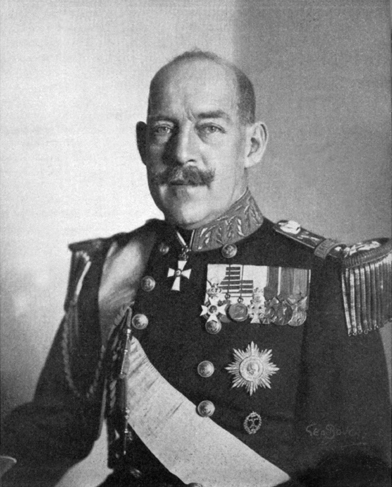
King Constantine I of Greece

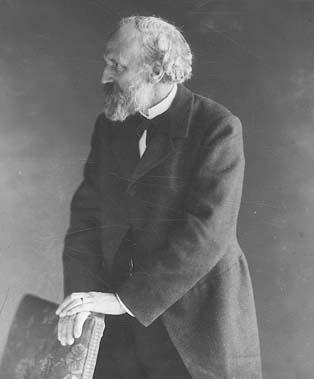
Alexandre Ribot

- January 1 – Willie Keeler, American baseball player, MLB Hall of Famer (b. 1872)
- January 2
  - Thomas Bavister, English-born Australian politician (b. 1850)
  - Girolamo Caruso, Italian agronomist, teacher (b. 1842)
- January 3 – Jaroslav Hašek, Czech writer (b. 1883)
- January 8 – Shimamura Hayao, Japanese admiral (b. 1858)
- January 9
  - Katherine Mansfield, New Zealand-born British novelist, died in France (b. 1888)
  - Edith Thompson and Frederick Bywaters, British couple hanged for murder (Thompson b. 1893, Bywaters b. 1902)
- January 11 – Constantine I, abdicated king of Greece (b. 1868)
- January 12 – Herbert Silberer, Austrian psychoanalyst (b. 1882)
- January 13 – Alexandre Ribot, French statesman, 46th Prime Minister of France (b. 1842)
- January 16 – Abdul Kerim Pasha, Ottoman general (b. 1872)
- January 18 – Wallace Reid, American actor (b. 1891)
- January 19 – Amalia Eriksson, Swedish businesswoman (b. 1824)
- January 23 – Max Nordau, Hungarian author, philosopher and Zionist leader (b. 1849)
- January 27 – Carolina Santocanale, Italian Roman Catholic nun and blessed (b. 1852)
- January 30 – Columba Marmion, Irish Benedictine and Roman Catholic monk and blessed (b. 1858)
- January 31 – Eligiusz Niewiadomski, Polish artist, political activist and assassin (executed) (b. 1869)

=== February ===
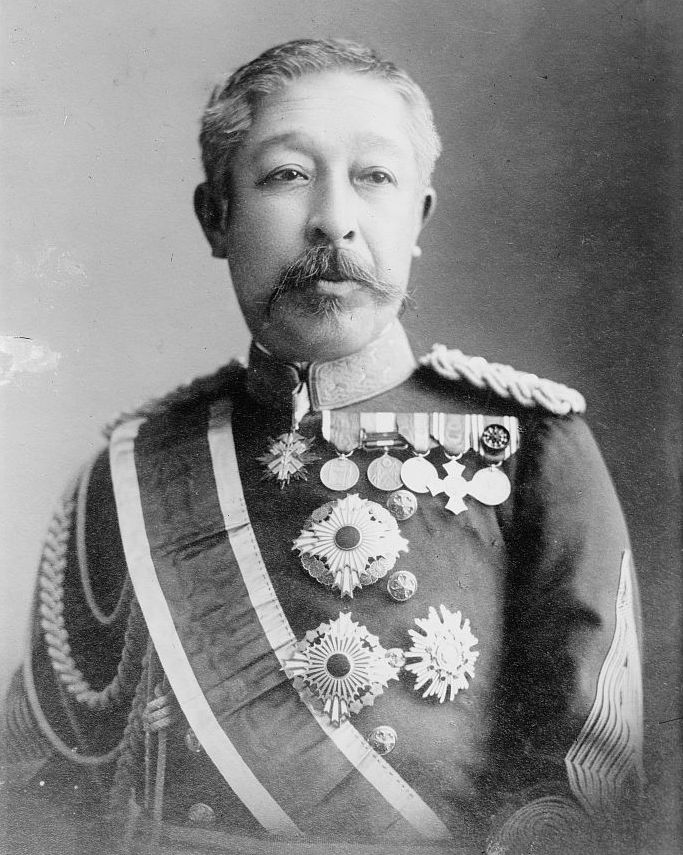
Prince Fushimi Sadanaru

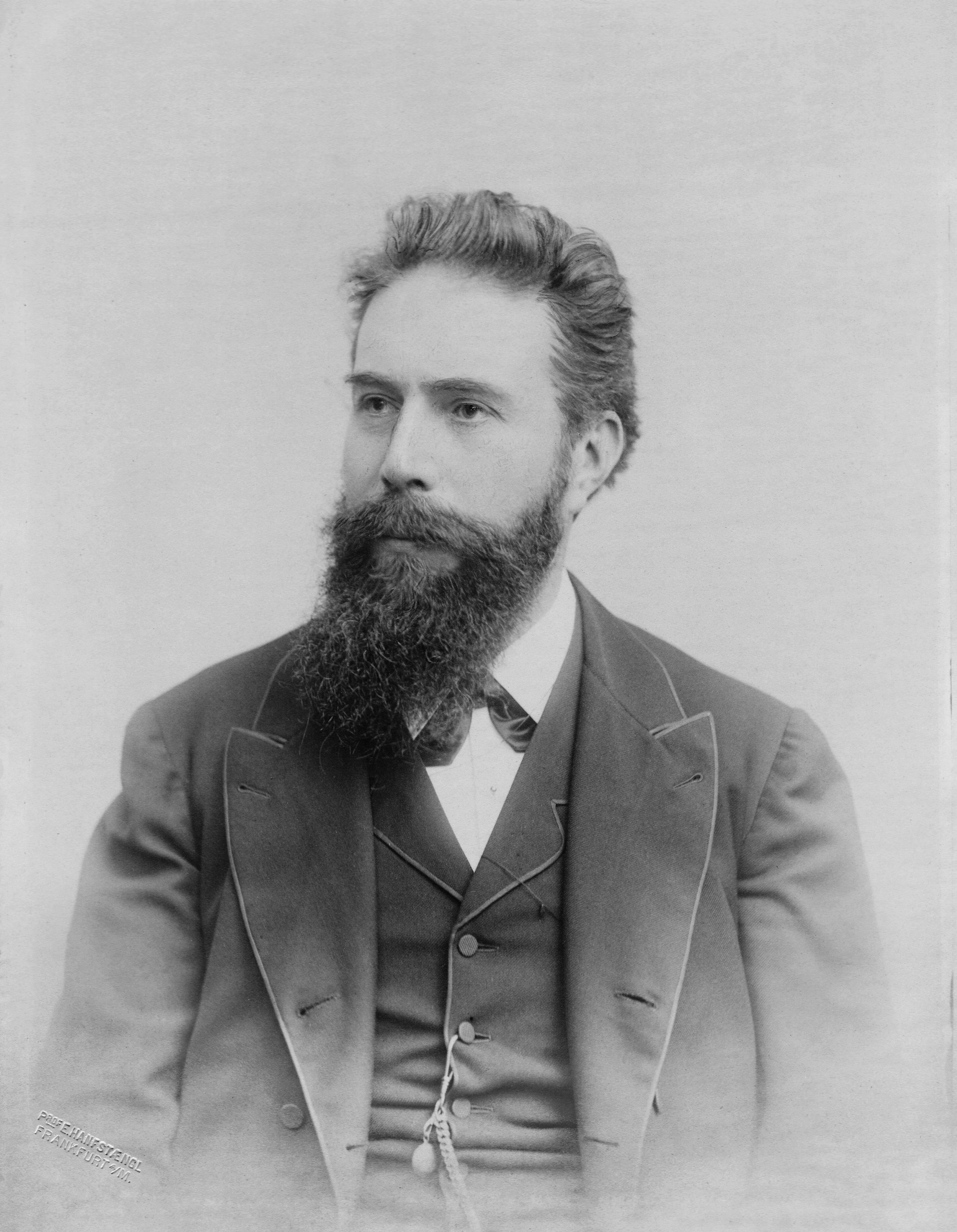
Wilhelm Röntgen

- February 1
  - Ernst Troeltsch, German theologian (b. 1865)
  - Luigi Variara, Italian Roman Catholic priest and blessed (b. 1875)
- February 3 – Count Kuroki Tamemoto, Japanese general (b. 1844)
- February 4 – Prince Fushimi Sadanaru of Japan (b. 1858)
- February 5 – Count Erich Kielmansegg, former Prime Minister of Austria (b. 1847)
- February 6
  - Edward Emerson Barnard, American astronomer (b. 1857)
  - Gerdt von Bassewitz, Prussian general, playwright and actor (b. 1878)
- February 8 – Bernard Bosanquet, English philosopher and political theorist (b. 1848)
- February 10 – Wilhelm Röntgen, German physicist, Nobel Prize laureate (b. 1845)
- February 14 – Bartolomeo Bacilieri, Italian Roman Catholic cardinal (b. 1842)
- February 19 – Gerónimo Giménez, Spanish conductor, composer (b. 1854)
- February 21 – Prince Miguel, Duke of Viseu (b. 1878)
- February 22
  - Théophile Delcassé, French statesman (b. 1852)
  - Princess Marie Elisabeth of Saxe-Meiningen (b. 1853)
- February 24 – Edward W. Morley, American physicist, chemist (b. 1838)
- February 26 – Walter B. Barrows, American naturalist (b. 1855)

=== March ===
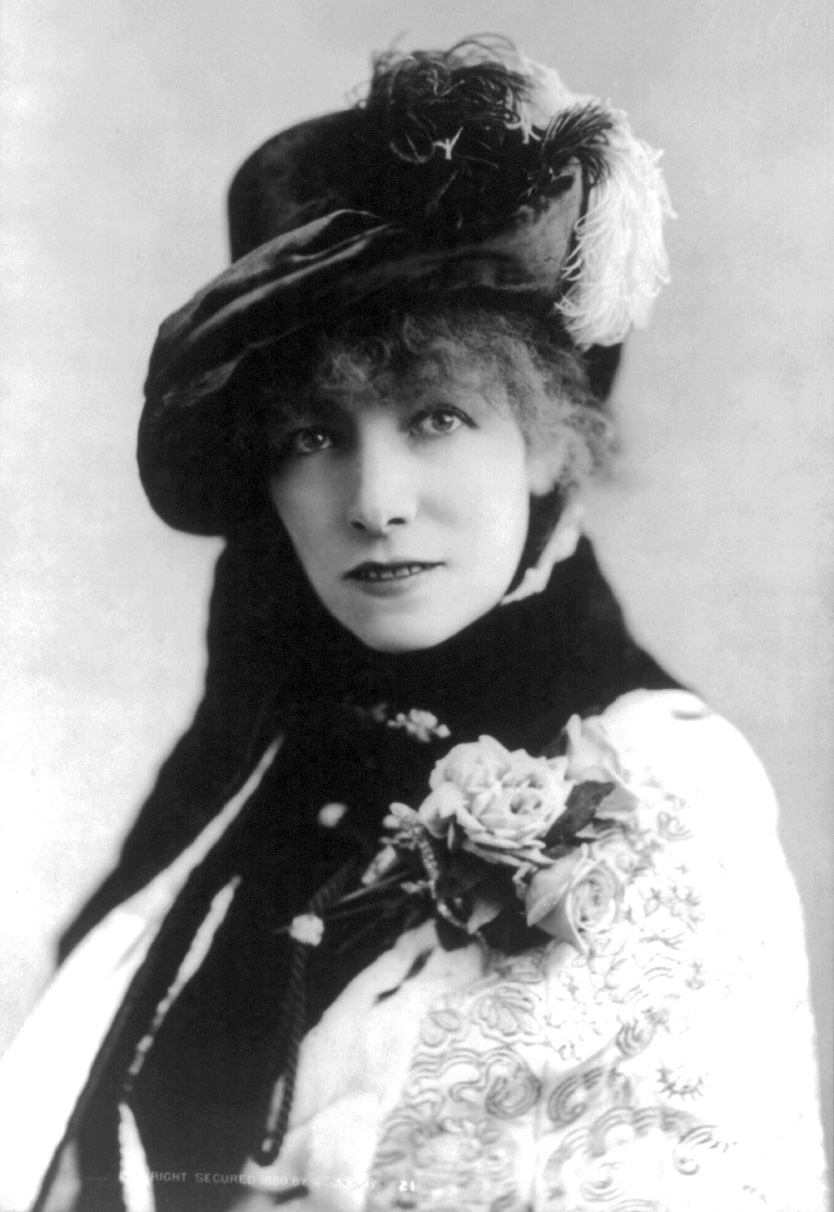
Sarah Bernhardt

- March 1 – Rui Barbosa, Brazilian polymath, diplomat, writer, jurist and politician (b. 1849)
  - William Bourke Cockran, Irish-American congressman and politician (b. 1854)
- March 3 – Melancthon J. Briggs, American lawyer, politician (b. 1846)
- March 6 – Joseph McDermott, American actor (b. 1878)
- March 8
  - Pascual Álvarez, Filipino general (b. 1861)
  - Johannes Diderik van der Waals, Dutch physicist, Nobel Prize laureate (b. 1837)
- March 11 – Júlia da Silva Bruhns, Brazilian merchant (b. 1851)
- March 25 – Inokuchi Ariya, Japanese technologist, professor (b. 1856)
- March 26 – Sarah Bernhardt, French actress (b. 1844)
- March 27 – Sir James Dewar, British chemist (b. 1842)
- March 28 – Michel-Joseph Maunoury, French general (b. 1847)
- March 31 – Konstantin Budkevich, Soviet Roman Catholic priest and servant of God (executed) (b. 1867)

=== April ===
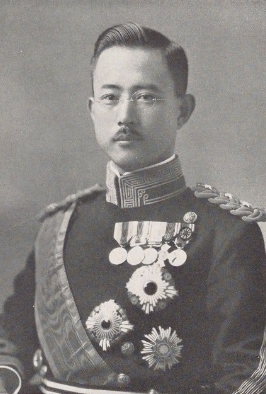
Prince Naruhisa Kitashirakawa

- April 1 – Prince Naruhisa Kitashirakawa of Japan (b. 1887)
- April 2 – Michel Théato, Luxembourg athlete (b. 1878)
- April 4
  - Julius Martov, Russian Menshevik leader (b. 1873)
  - John Venn, British mathematician (b. 1834)
- April 5 – George Herbert, 5th Earl of Carnarvon, British financier of Egyptian excavations (b. 1866)
- April 6 – Alice Cunningham Fletcher, American ethnologist and anthropologist (b. 1838)
- April 15 – Ascensión Esquivel Ibarra, 17th President of Costa Rica (b. 1844)
- April 16 – Isidore Jacques Eggermont, Belgian diplomat (b. 1844)
- April 17 – Madre Teresa Nuzzo, Maltese Roman Catholic nun and blessed (b. 1851)
- April 18 – Savina Petrilli, Italian Roman Catholic religious professed and blessed (b. 1851)
- April 22
  - Frank Baldwin, American general (b. 1842)
  - Thomas Perrett, Sgt in the Confederate States Army and North Carolina State Senator (b. 1843)
- April 23
  - Mary Cynthia Dickerson, American herpetologist (b. 1866)
  - Princess Louise of Prussia (b. 1838)
- April 24 – William Ernest, Grand Duke of Saxe-Weimar-Eisenach (b. 1876)

=== May ===
- May 5 – Rosario de Acuña, Spanish author (b. 1850)
- May 9 – Constantin Cristescu, Romanian general (b. 1866)
- May 10 – Charles de Freycinet, French statesman, Prime Minister of France (b. 1828)
- May 17
  - Manuel Allendesalazar y Muñoz de Salazar, Spanish nobleman, politician, and Prime Minister of Spain (b. 1856)
  - Thomas Scott Baldwin, American balloonist, general (b. 1854)
  - Duke Paul Frederick of Mecklenburg (b. 1852)
- May 21
  - Hans Goldschmidt, German chemist (b. 1861)
  - Charles Kent, British actor (b. 1852)
- May 23 – Nicola Barbato, Italian doctor, socialist and politician (b. 1856)
- May 29 – Albert Deullin, French flying ace of World War I (b. 1890)

=== June ===
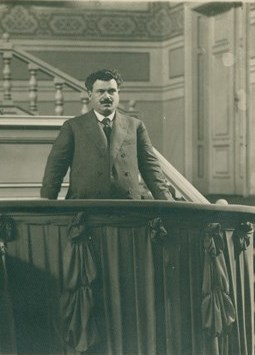
Aleksandar Stamboliyski

- June 4
  - Alexander Milne Calder, Scottish-born American sculptor (b. 1846)
  - Filippo Smaldone, Italian Roman Catholic priest, saint (b. 1848)
- June 5 – Carl von Horn, German general (b. 1847)
- June 9
  - Takeo Arishima, Japanese novelist, writer and essayist (b. 1878)
  - Princess Helena of the United Kingdom, third daughter of Queen Victoria (b. 1846)
- June 10 – Pierre Loti, French writer, naval officer (b. 1850)
- June 12 – Kate Bishop, English actress (b. 1848)
- June 14
  - Isabelle Bogelot, French philanthropist (b. 1838)
  - Aleksandar Stamboliyski, 20th Prime Minister of Bulgaria (assassinated) (b. 1879)
- June 17 – Alexis-Xyste Bernard, Canadian Catholic bishop (b. 1847)
- June 18 – Hristo Smirnenski, Bulgarian poet (b. 1898)
- June 20 – Princess Marie of Battenberg (b. 1852)
- June 23 – Keiichi Aichi, Japanese physicist (b. 1880)
- June 24 – Edith Södergran, Finnish author (b. 1892)

=== July ===
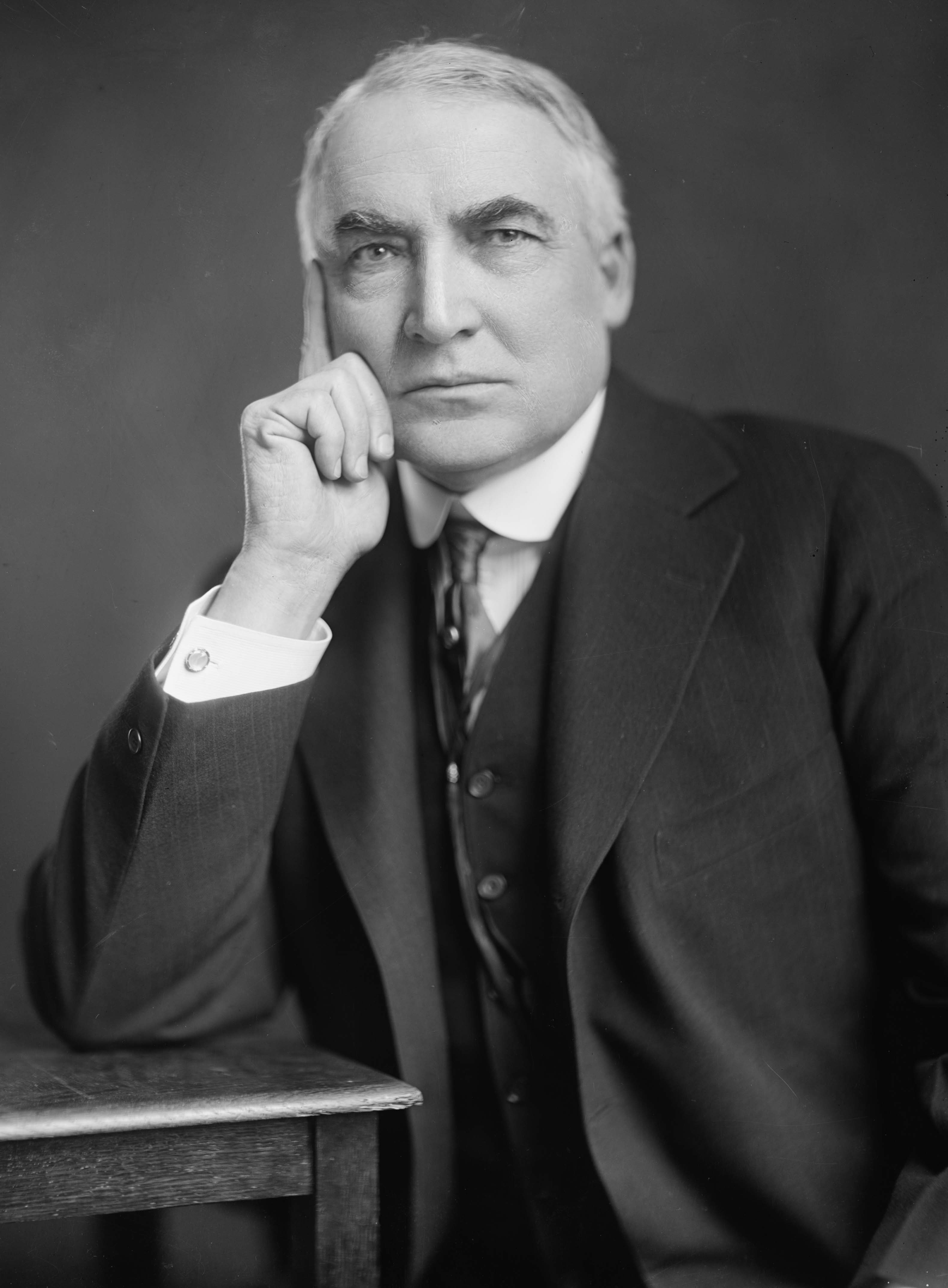
Warren G. Harding

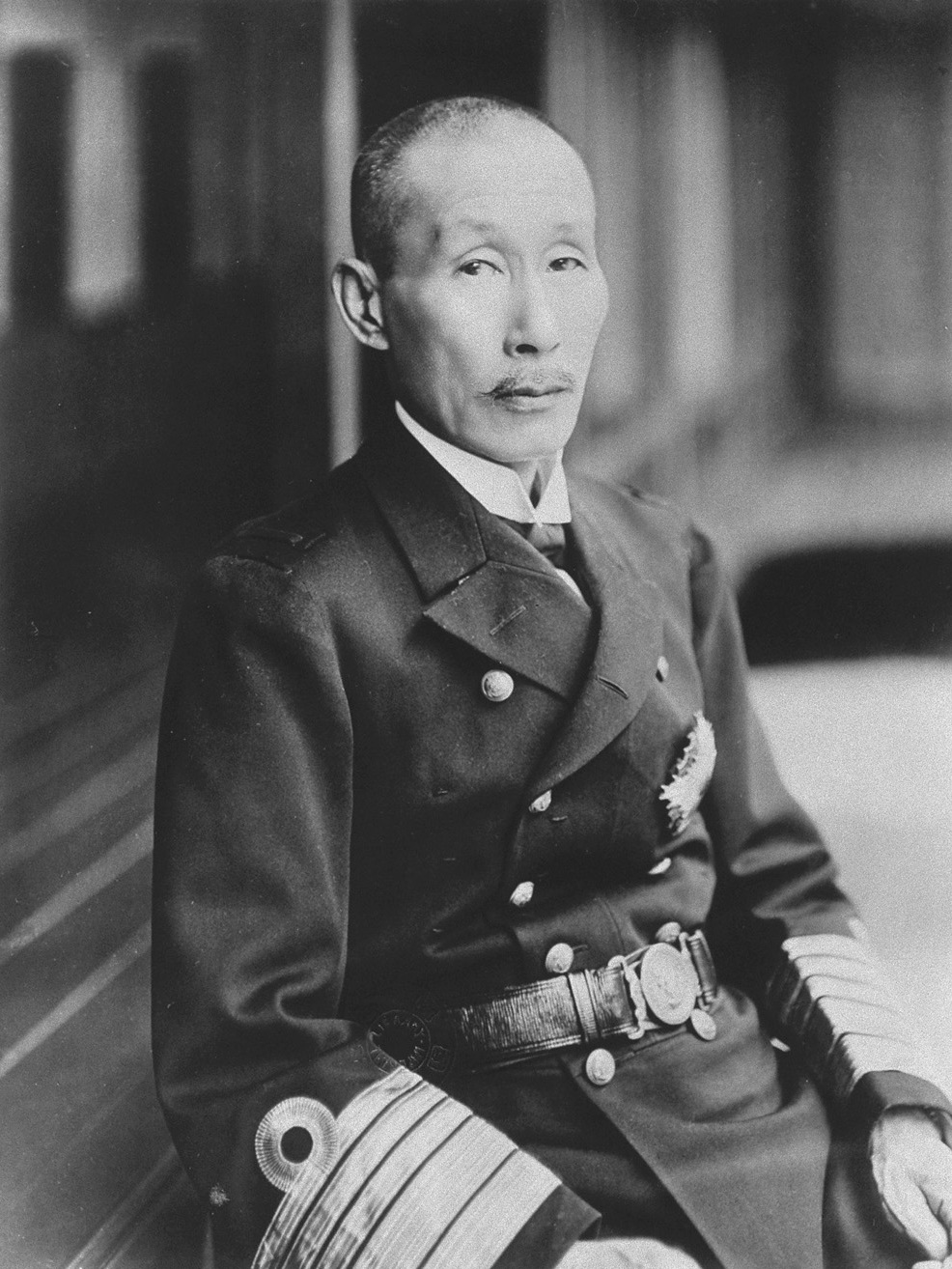
Kato Tomosaburo

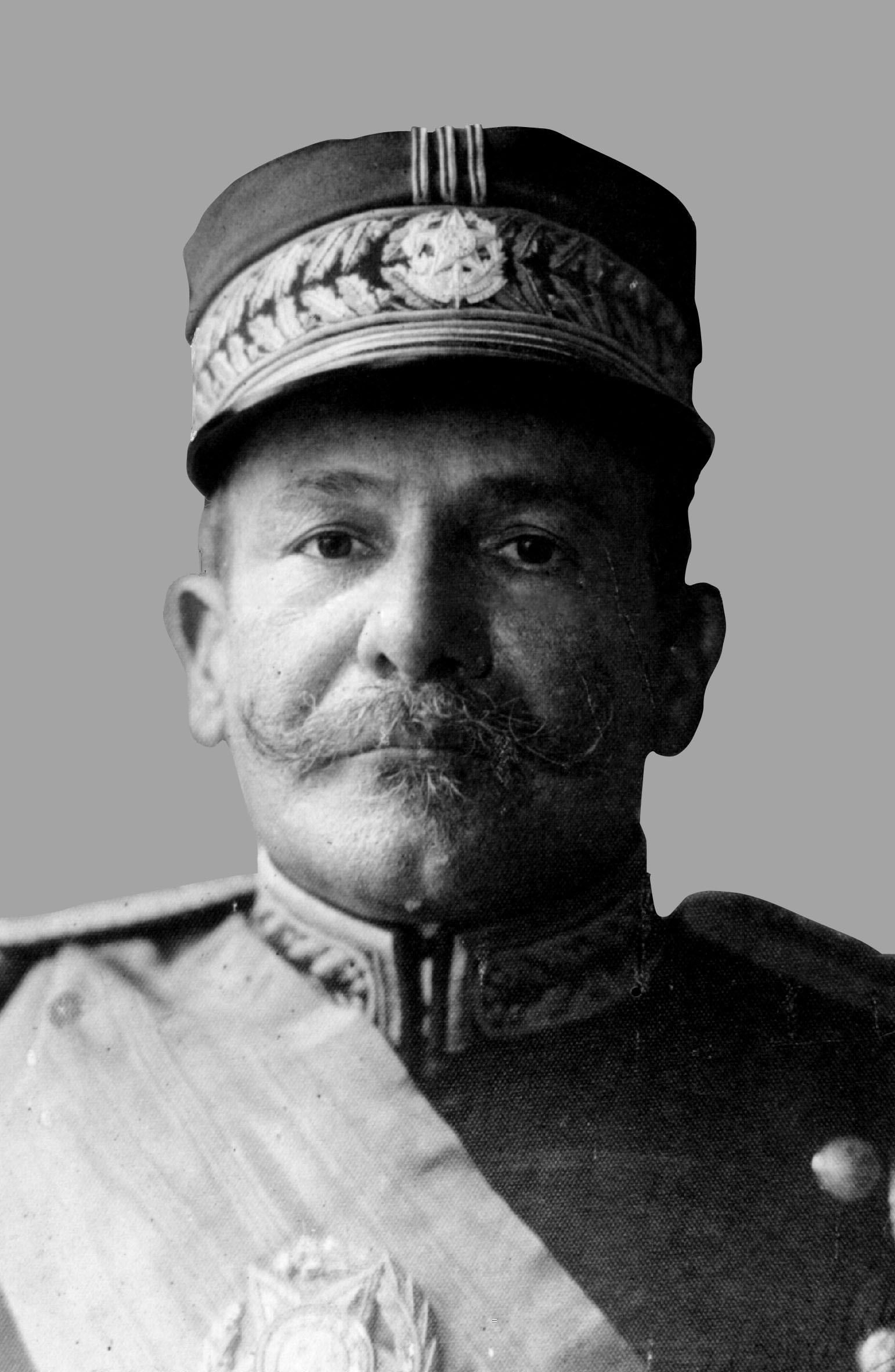
Hermes Rodrigues da Fonseca

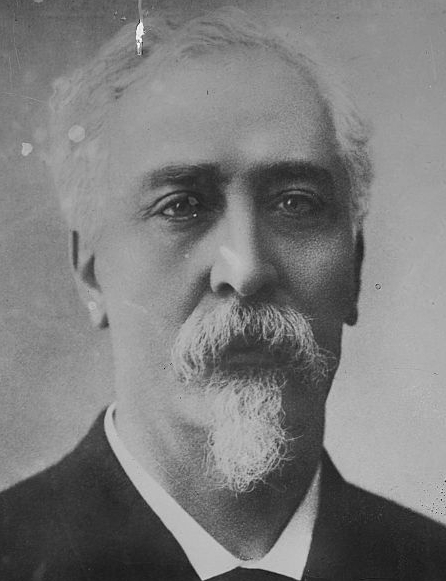
Stephanos Dragoumis

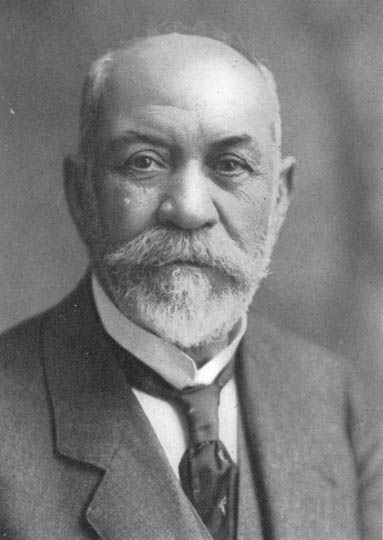
Stojan Protić

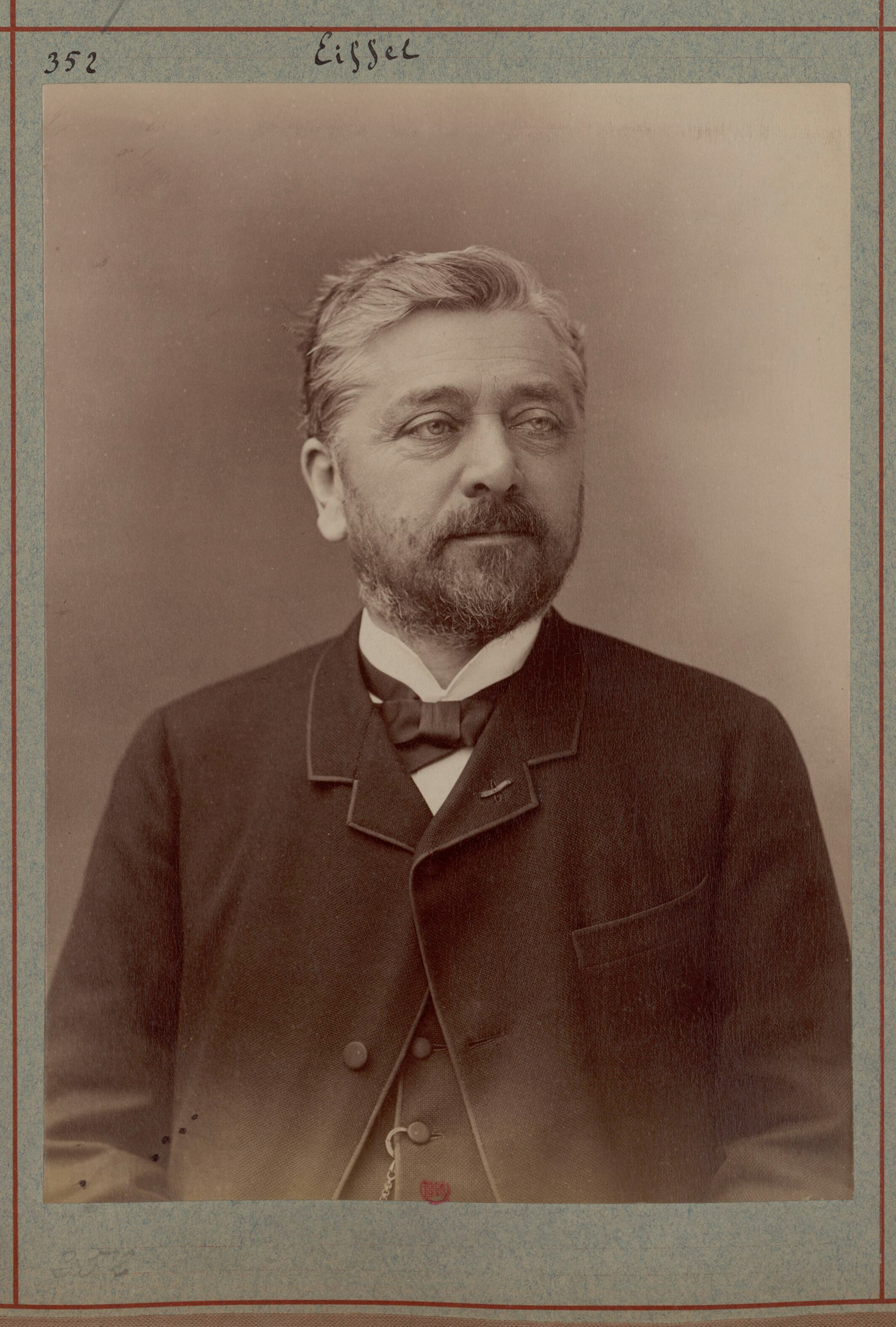
Gustave Eiffel

- July 9 – William R. Day, American lawyer and diplomat, Associate Justice of the Supreme Court of the United States (b. 1849)
- July 10 – Albert Chevalier, British music hall comedian (b. 1861)
- July 12 – Ernst Otto Beckmann, German pharmacist, chemist (b. 1853)
- July 17 – Theodor Rosetti, 16th Prime Minister of Romania (b. 1837)
- July 19 – Auguste Bouché-Leclercq, French historian (b. 1842)
- July 20 – Pancho Villa, Mexican revolutionary (assassinated) (b. 1878)
- July 23 – Charles Dupuy, French statesman, Prime Minister of France (b. 1851)
- July 30 – Sir Charles Hawtrey, British actor (b. 1858)

=== August ===
- August 1 – Pierre Brizon, French teacher, deputy and pacifist (b. 1878)
- August 2 – Warren G. Harding, American politician, 29th President of the United States (b. 1865)
- August 5 – Vatroslav Jagić, Croatian scholar (b. 1838)
- August 9 – Victor II, Duke of Ratibor (b. 1847)
- August 10 – Joaquín Sorolla, Spanish painter (b. 1863)
- August 15 – Marty Hogan, English baseball player (b. 1869)
- August 19 – Vilfredo Pareto, Italian economist (b. 1848)
- August 21 – Sir William Meredith, Canadian politician and judge (b. 1840)
- August 24
  - Katō Tomosaburō, Imperial Japanese Navy officer, 12th Prime Minister of Japan (b. 1861)
  - Kate Douglas Wiggin, American author (b. 1856)
- August 26 – Hertha Ayrton, English engineer, mathematician and inventor (b. 1854)
- August 29 – Princess Anastasia of Greece and Denmark (b. 1878)

=== September ===
- September 6 – Pedro José Escalón, Salvadorian military officer, 21st President of El Salvador (b. 1847)
- September 9 – Hermes Rodrigues da Fonseca, Brazilian soldier and politician, 8th President of Brazil (b. 1855)
- September 14 – Nemesio Canales, Puerto Rican essayist, novelist, playwright, journalist, activist and politician (b. 1878)
- September 17 – Stefanos Dragoumis, Prime Minister of Greece (b. 1842)
- September 19 – Sophus Andersen, Danish composer (b. 1859)
- September 23
  - Antonio Francisco Xavier Alvares, Indian Orthodox priest and saint (b. 1836)
  - Carl L. Boeckmann, Norwegian-born American artist (b. 1867)
  - John Morley, 1st Viscount Morley of Blackburn, British politician, editor (b. 1838)
- September 25 – Elbazduko Britayev, Russian playwright, author (b. 1881)
- September 26 – Luigi Tezza, Italian Roman Catholic priest and blessed (b. 1841)

=== October ===
- October 3 – Kadambini Ganguly, doctor (b. 1861)
- October 6 – Damat Ferid Pasha, Grand Vizier of the Ottoman Empire
- October 10
  - Herman Gottfried Breijer, Dutch-born South African naturalist and museologist (b. 1864)
  - Andrés Avelino Cáceres, Peruvian general, twice President of Peru (b. 1836)
- October 12 – Diego Manuel Chamorro, 14th President of Nicaragua (b. 1861)
- October 26 – Charles Proteus Steinmetz, German-American engineer and electrician (b. 1865)
- October 28
  - Stojan Protić, Yugoslav statesman and writer, 1st Prime Minister of Yugoslavia (b. 1857)
  - Theodor Reuss, German occultist (b. 1855)
- October 30 – Bonar Law, British politician, 39th Prime Minister of the United Kingdom (b. 1858)

=== November ===
- November 5 – Jacques d'Adelswärd-Fersen, French novelist and poet (b. 1880)
- November 9 (among those killed in Munich Beer Hall Putsch):
  - Oskar Körner, German businessman (b. 1875)
  - Karl Laforce, German student (b. 1904)
  - Ludwig Maximilian Erwin von Scheubner-Richter, German diplomat, revolutionary (b. 1884)
- November 10 – Ricciotto Canudo, Italian theoretician (b. 1877)
- November 14 – Ernest Augustus, Crown Prince of Hanover (b. 1845)
- November 15 – Mohammad Yaqub Khan, Emir of Afghanistan (b. 1849)
- November 21 – Lars Emil Bruun, Danish grocer, numismatist (b. 1852)
- November 30 – Martha Mansfield, American actress (b. 1899)

=== December ===
- December 2 – Tomás Bretón, Spanish composer (b. 1850)
- December 4 – Maurice Barres, French novelist, journalist and politician (b. 1862)
- December 9 – Meggie Albanesi, British actress (b. 1899)
- December 10 – Thomas George Bonney, English geologist (b. 1833)
- December 11 – Kata Dalström, Swedish politician (b. 1858)
- December 13 – Théophile Steinlen, Swiss painter (b. 1859)
- December 14 – Giuseppe Gallignani, Italian composer, conductor and teacher (b. 1851)
- December 22 – Georg Luger, German firearms designer (b. 1849)
- December 25 – William Ludwig, Irish opera singer (b. 1847)
- December 26 – Rafael Valentín Errázuriz, Chilean politician, diplomat (b. 1861)
- December 27
  - Gustave Eiffel, French engineer, architect (Eiffel Tower) (b. 1832)
  - Lluís Domènech i Montaner, Spanish architect (b. 1850)
- December 28 – Frank Hayes, American actor (b. 1871)

=== Date unknown ===
- Józef Tretiak, Polish writer (b. 1841)

== Nobel Prizes ==

- Physics – Robert Andrews Millikan
- Chemistry – Fritz Pregl
- Physiology or Medicine – Frederick Banting, John Macleod
- Literature – W. B. Yeats
