= List of dialling codes in Ukraine =

Telephone country code: 380
International call prefix: 0~0
Trunk prefix: 0~

== Zone 3 ==
=== 31 – Zakarpattia Oblast ===
- 31(2) – Uzhhorod
- 312 – Chop
- 3131 – Mukachevo
- 3132 – Rakhiv
- 3133 – Svaliava
- 3134 – Tiachiv
- 3135 – Velykyi Bereznyi
- 3136 – Volovets
- 3141 – Berehove
- 3142 – Khust
- 3143 – Vynohradiv
- 3144 – Irshava
- 3145 – Perechyn
- 3146 – Mizhhiria

=== 32 – Lviv Oblast ===
- 32(2) – Lviv
- 3230 – Pustomyty
- 3231 – Horodok
- 3234 – Mostyska
- 3236 – Sambir
- 3238 – Staryi Sambir
- 3239 – Zhydachiv
- 3241 – Mykolaiv
- 3244 – Drohobych
- 3245 – Stryi
- 3247 – Truskavets
- 3248 – Boryslav
- 3249 – Sheptytskyi
- 3251 – Skole
- 3252 – Zhovkva
- 3254 – Kamianka-Buzka
- 3255 – Radekhiv
- 3256 – Novoiavorivsk
- 3257 – Sokal
- 3259 – Yavoriv
- 3264 – Busk
- 3260 – Morshyn
- 3263 – Peremyshliany
- 3265 – Zolochiv
- 3266 – Brody
- 3269 – Turka

=== 33 – Volyn Oblast ===
- 33(2) – Lutsk
- 3342 – Volodymyr
- 3344 – Novovolynsk
- 3346 – Stara Vyzhivka
- 3352 – Kovel
- 3355 – Shatsk
- 3357 – Kamin-Kashyrskyi
- 3362 – Liubeshiv
- 3363 – Turiisk
- 3365 – Kivertsi, Tsuman
- 3366 – Ratne
- 3368 – Rozhyshche
- 3372 – Ivanychi
- 3374 – Lokachi
- 3376 – Manevychi
- 3377 – Liuboml
- 3379 – Horokhiv

=== 34 – Ivano-Frankivsk Oblast ===
- 34(2) – Ivano-Frankivsk
- 3430 – Horodenka
- 3431 – Halych
- 3432 – Verkhovyna
- 3433 – Kolomyia
- 3434 – Yaremche
- 3435 – Rohatyn
- 3436 – Tysmenytsia
- 3437 – Bolekhiv
- 3438 – Burshtyn
- 3471 – Bohorodchany, Solotvyn
- 3472 – Kalush
- 3474 – Rozhniativ
- 3475 – Nadvirna
- 3476 – Sniatyn, Zabolotiv
- 3477 – Dolyna
- 3478 – Kosiv
- 3479 – Tlumach

=== 35 – Ternopil Oblast ===
- 35(2) – Ternopil
- 3540 – Zboriv
- 3541 – Borshchiv
- 3542 – Pidhaitsi
- 3543 – Pidvolochysk
- 3544 – Buchach
- 3546 – Kremenets
- 3547 – Kozliv, Kozova
- 3548 – Berezhany
- 3549 – Lanivtsi
- 3550 – Zbarazh
- 3551 – Terebovlia
- 3552 – Chortkiv
- 3554 – Zalishchyky
- 3555 – Monastyryska
- 3557 – Husiatyn
- 3558 – Shumsk

=== 36 – Rivne Oblast ===
- 36(2) – Rivne
- 3632 – Zarichne
- 3633 – Radyvyliv
- 3634 – Volodymyrets
- 3635 – Rokytne
- 3636 – Varash
- 3650 – Hoshcha
- 3651 – Korets
- 3652 – Zdolbuniv
- 3653 – Berezne
- 3654 – Ostroh
- 3655 – Sarny
- 3656 – Dubno
- 3657 – Kostopil
- 3658 – Dubrovytsia
- 3659 – Mlyniv

=== 37 – Chernivtsi Oblast ===
- 37(2) – Chernivtsi
- 3730 – Vyzhnytsia
- 37312 – Khotyn
- 3732 – Kelmentsi
- 3733 – Novoselytsia
- 3734 – Hlyboka
- 3735 – Storozhynets
- 3736 – Kitsman
- 3737 – Zastavna
- 3738 – Putyla
- 3739 – Sokyriany

=== 38 – Khmelnytskyi Oblast ===
- 38(2) – Khmelnytskyi
- 3840 – Shepetivka
- 3841 – Bilohiria
- 3842 – Slavuta
- 3843 – Polonne
- 3844 – Teofipol
- 3845 – Volochysk
- 3846 – Vinkivtsi
- 3847 – Nova Ushytsia
- 3848 – Netishyn
- 3849 – Kamianets-Podilskyi
- 3850 – Stara Syniava
- 3851 – Horodok
- 3852 – Iziaslav
- 3853 – Yarmolyntsi
- 3854 – Starokostiantyniv
- 3855 – Krasyliv
- 3856 – Derazhnia
- 3857 – Letychiv
- 3858 – Dunaivtsi
- 3859 – Chemerivtsi

== Zone 4 ==
=== 41 – Zhytomyr Oblast ===
- 41(2) – Zhytomyr
- 4130 – Korostyshiv
- 4131 – Pulyny
- 4132 – Radomyshl
- 4133 – Malyn
- 4134 – Cherniakhiv
- 4135 – Olevsk
- 4136 – Andrushivka
- 4137 – Popilnia
- 4138 – Ruzhyn
- 4139 – Chudniv
- 4140 – Narodychi
- 4141 – Zviahel
- 4142 – Korosten
- 4143 – Berdychiv
- 4144 – Baranivka
- 4145 – Khoroshiv
- 4146 – Romaniv
- 4147 – Liubar
- 4148 – Ovruch
- 4149 – Yemilchyne
- 4161 – Luhyny
- 4162 – Brusyliv

=== 43 – Vinnytsia Oblast ===
- 43(2) – Vinnytsia
- 4330 – Orativ
- 4331 – Nemyriv
- 4332 – Zhmerynka
- 4333 – Kalynivka
- 4334 – Haisyn
- 4335 – Tulchyn
- 4336 – Yampil
- 4337 – Mohyliv-Podilskyi
- 4338 – Khmilnyk
- 4340 – Kryzhopil
- 4341 – Bar
- 4342 – Koziatyn
- 4343 – Ladyzhyn, Trostianets
- 4344 – Sharhorod
- 4345 – Illintsi
- 4346 – Pohrebyshche
- 4347 – Lityn
- 4348 – Tomashpil
- 4349 – Pishchanka
- 4350 – Vapniarka
- 4351 – Chechelnyk
- 4352 – Bershad
- 4353 – Teplyk
- 4355 – Hnivan, Tyvriv
- 4356 – Murovani Kurylivtsi
- 4357 – Chernivtsi
- 4358 – Lypovets

=== 44 – Kyiv ===
- 44 – Kyiv

=== 45 – Kyiv Oblast ===
- 4560 – Tetiiv
- 4561 – Bohuslav
- 4562 – Rokytne
- 4563 – Bila Tserkva
- 4564 – Stavyshche
- 4565 – Fastiv
- 4566 – Tarashcha
- 4567 – Pereiaslav
- 4568 – Skvyra
- 4569 – Volodarka
- 4570 – Zghurivka
- 4571 – Vasylkiv
- 4572 – Obukhiv
- 4573 – Kaharlyk
- 4574 – Myronivka
- 4575 – Yahotyn
- 4576 – Baryshivka
- 4577 – Borodianka
- 4578 – Makariv
- 4579 – Slavutych
- 4591 – Ivankiv
- 4593 – Chernobyl
- 4594 – Brovary
- 4595 – Boryspil
- 4596 – Vyshhorod
- 4597 – Irpin, Bucha
- 4598 – Vyshneve

=== 46 – Chernihiv Oblast ===
- 46(2) – Chernihiv
- 4631 – Nizhyn
- 4632 – Bobrovytsia
- 4633 – Ichnia
- 4634 – Talalaivka
- 4635 – Baturyn, Bakhmach
- 4636 – Varva
- 4637 – Pryluky
- 4639 – Sribne
- 4641 – Ripky
- 4642 – Nosivka
- 4643 – Kulykivka
- 4644 – Mena
- 4645 – Horodnia
- 4646 – Kozelets
- 4653 – Borzna
- 4654 – Snovsk
- 4655 – Sosnytsia
- 4656 – Korop
- 4657 – Koriukivka
- 4658 – Novhorod-Siverskyi
- 4659 – Semenivka

=== 47 – Cherkasy Oblast ===
- 47(2) – Cherkasy
- 4730 – Chyhyryn
- 4731 – Talne
- 4732 – Kamianka
- 4733 – Smila
- 4734 – Horodyshche
- 4735 – Korsun-Shevchenkivskyi
- 4736 – Kaniv
- 4737 – Zolotonosha
- 4738 – Drabiv
- 4739 – Chornobai
- 4740 – Zvenyhorodka
- 4741 – Shpola
- 4742 – Kalynopil
- 4744 – Uman
- 4745 – Khrystynivka
- 4746 – Monastyryshche
- 4747 – Zhashkiv
- 4748 – Mankivka
- 4749 – Lysianka

=== 48 – Odesa Oblast ===
- 48 – Odesa
- 4840 – Reni
- 4841 – Izmail
- 4843 – Kiliia
- 4844 – Tatarbunary
- 4845 – Artsyz
- 4846 – Bolhrad
- 4847 – Bessarabske
- 4848 – Sarata
- 4849 – Bilhorod-Dnistrovskyi
- 4850 – Teplodar
- 4851 – Ovidiopol
- 4852 – Biliaivka
- 4853 – Rozdilna
- 4854 – Ivanivka
- 4855 – Dobroslav
- 4856 – Berezivka
- 4857 – Mykolaivka
- 4858 – Shyriaieve
- 4859 – Velyka Mykhailivka
- 4860 – Zakharivka
- 4861 – Okny
- 4862 – Podilsk
- 4863 – Ananiv
- 4864 – Liubashivka
- 4865 – Savran
- 4866 – Balta
- 4867 – Kodyma
- 4868 – Chornomorsk

== Zone 5 ==
=== 51 – Mykolaiv Oblast ===
- 51(2) – Mykolaiv
- 5131 – Bratske
- 5132 – Arbuzynka
- 5133 – Kryve Ozero
- 5134 – Voznesensk
- 5135 – Vradiivka
- 5136 – Pivdennoukrainsk
- 5151 – Novyi Buh
- 5152 – Domanivka
- 5153 – Berezanka
- 5154 – Ochakiv
- 5158 – Bashtanka
- 5159 – Yelanets
- 5161 – Pervomaisk
- 5162 – Snihurivka
- 5163 – Veselynove
- 5164 – Kazanka
- 5167 – Nova Odesa
- 5168 – Bereznehuvate

=== 52 – Kirovohrad Oblast ===
- 52(2) – Kropyvnytskyi
- 5233 – Znamianka
- 5234 – Dolynska
- 5235 – Oleksandriia
- 5236 – Svitlovodsk
- 5237 – Petrove
- 5238 – Onufriivka
- 5239 – Ustynivka
- 5240 – Kompaniivka
- 5241 – Kamianets
- 5242 – Oleksandrivka
- 5250 – Vilshanka
- 5251 – Novoukrainka
- 5252 – Holovanivsk
- 5253 – Dobrovelychkivka
- 5254 – Haivoron
- 5255 – Novoarkhanhelsk
- 5256 – Novomyrhorod
- 5257 – Bobrynets
- 5258 – Mala Vyska
- 5259 – Blahovishchenske

=== 53 – Poltava Oblast ===
- 53(2) – Poltava
- 5340 – Chornukhy
- 5341 – Semenivka
- 5342 – Kozelshchyna
- 5343 – Kobeliaky
- 5344 – Novi Sanzhary
- 5345 – Velyka Bahachka
- 5346 – Karlivka
- 5347 – Chutove
- 5348 – Horishni Plavni
- 5350 – Kotelva
- 5351 – Dykanka
- 5352 – Shyshaky
- 5353 – Zinkiv
- 5354 – Hadiach
- 5355 – Myrhorod
- 5356 – Lokhvytsia
- 5357 – Orzhytsia
- 5358 – Pyriatyn
- 5359 – Hrebinka
- 536 – Kremenchuk
- 5361 – Lubny
- 5362 – Khorol
- 5363 – Reshetylivka
- 5364 – Mashivka
- 5365 – Hlobyne

=== 54 – Sumy Oblast ===
- 54(2) – Sumy
- 5442 – Putyvl
- 5443 – Bilopillia
- 5444 – Hlukhiv
- 5445 – Lebedyn
- 5446 – Okhtyrka
- 5447 – Konotop
- 5448 – Romny
- 5449 – Shostka
- 5451 – Seredyna-Buda
- 5452 – Lypova Dolyna
- 5453 – Krolevets
- 5454 – Buryn
- 5455 – Nedryhailiv
- 5456 – Yampil
- 5457 – Velyka Pysarivka
- 5458 – Trostianets
- 5459 – Krasnopillia

=== 55 – Kherson Oblast ===
- 55(2) – Kherson
- 5530 – Kalanchak
- 5531 – Ivanivka
- 5532 – Velyka Oleksandrivka
- 5533 – Novovorontsovka
- 5534 – Henichesk
- 5535 – Vysokopillia
- 5536 – Kakhovka
- 5537 – Skadovsk
- 5538 – Chaplynka
- 5539 – Hola Prystan
- 5540 – Nyzhni Sirohozy
- 5542 – Oleshky
- 5543 – Velyka Lepetykha
- 5544 – Hornostaivka
- 5545 – Verkhnii Rohachyk
- 5546 – Beryslav
- 5547 – Bilozerka
- 5548 – Novotroitske
- 5549 – Nova Kakhovka

=== 56 – Dnipropetrovsk Oblast ===
- 56 – Dnipro
- 563 – Pavlohrad
- 5630 – Mezhova
- 5631 – Petropavlivka
- 5633 – Shakhtarske
- 5634 – Petrykivka
- 5635 – Yuriivka
- 5636 – Ternivka
- 5638 – Pokrovske
- 5639 – Vasylkivka
- 56(4) – Kryvyi Rih
- 5650 – Sofiivka
- 5651 – Piatykhatky
- 5652 – Zhovti Vody
- 5653 – Vilnohirsk
- 5654 – Krynychky
- 5656 – Apostolove
- 5657 – Shyroke
- 5658 – Verkhniodniprovsk
- 566 – Nikopol
- 5663 – Synelnykove
- 5665 – Marhanets
- 5667 – Pokrov
- 5668 – Tomakivka
- 5669 – Solone
- 569 – Kamianske, Samar
- 5690 – Tsarychanka
- 5691 – Mahdalynivka

=== 57 – Kharkiv Oblast ===
- 57 – Kharkiv
- 5740 – Nova Vodolaha
- 5741 – Vovchansk
- 5742 – Kupiansk
- 5743 – Izium
- 5744 – Berestyn
- 5745 – Lozova
- 5746 – Chuhuiv
- 5747 – Zmiiv
- 5748 – Zlatopil
- 5749 – Balakliia
- 5750 – Dvorichna
- 5751 – Shevchenkove
- 5752 – Velykyi Burluk
- 5753 – Valky
- 5754 – Blyzniuky
- 5755 – Kehychivka
- 5756 – Krasnokutsk
- 5757 – Barvinkove
- 5758 – Bohodukhiv
- 5759 – Borova
- 5761 – Zachepylivka
- 5763 – Derhachi, Solonytsivka
- 5764 – Zolochiv

== Zone 6 ==
=== 61 – Zaporizhzhia Oblast ===
- 61 – Zaporizhzhia
- 6131 – Yakymivka
- 6132 – Mykhailivka
- 6133 – Pryazovske
- 6136 – Vesele
- 6137 – Prymorsk
- 6138 – Kamianka-Dniprovska
- 6139 – Enerhodar
- 6140 – Chernihivka
- 6141 – Orikhiv
- 6143 – Vilniansk
- 6144 – Novomykolaivka
- 6145 – Huliaipole
- 6147 – Kamianka
- 6153 – Berdiansk
- 6156 – Velyka Bilozerka
- 6162 – Rozivka
- 6165 – Polohy
- 6175 – Dniprorudne, Vasylivka
- 6178 – Tokmak
- 619 – Melitopol

=== 62 – Donetsk Oblast ===
- 62 – Donetsk
- 623(2) – Makiivka
- 6236 – Yasynuvata
- 6237 – Selydove
- 623(9) – Pokrovsk
- 624 – Horlivka
- 6243 – Velyka Novosilka
- 6244 – Volnovakha
- 6246 – Mykilske
- 6247 – Toretsk
- 6249 – Debaltseve
- 6252 – Yenakiieve
- 6253 – Starobesheve
- 6254 – Chystiakove
- 6255 – Shakhtarsk
- 6256 – Snizhne
- 6257 – Khartsyzk
- 6259 – Amvrosiivka
- 6261 – Khrestivka, Lyman
- 626(2) – Sloviansk
- 626(4) – Kramatorsk
- 6267 – Druzhkivka
- 6269 – Oleksandrivka
- 6272 – Kostiantynivka
- 6273 – Vuhledar
- 627(4) – Bakhmut
- 6275 – Dokuchaievsk
- 6277 – Dobropillia
- 6278 – Marinka
- 6279 – Boikivske
- 629 – Mariupol
- 6296 – Novoazovsk
- 6297 – Manhush

=== 64 – Luhansk Oblast ===
- 64(2) – Luhansk
- 642 – Oleksandrivsk
- 6431 – Antratsyt
- 6432 – Khrustalnyi
- 6433 – Rovenky
- 6434 – Dovzhansk
- 6435 – Sorokyne
- 6436 – Lutuhyne
- 6441 – Perevalsk
- 6442 – Alchevsk
- 6443 – Brianka
- 6444 – Kadiivka
- 6445 – Novoaidar
- 6446 – Holubivka
- 6451 – Lysychansk
- 6452 – Siverskodonetsk
- 6453 – Rubizhne
- 6454 – Kreminna
- 6455 – Sokolohirsk
- 6456 – Troitske
- 6461 – Starobilsk
- 6462 – Bilokurakyne
- 6463 – Aidar
- 6464 – Markivka
- 6465 – Milove
- 6466 – Bilovodsk
- 6471 – Svatove
- 6472 – Stanytsia Luhanska
- 6473 – Slovianoserbsk
- 6474 – Popasna

=== 65 – Autonomous Republic of Crimea ===
- 65(2) – Simferopol
- 654 – Dolossy (Sovietske), Yalta
- 6550 – Nyzhniohirskyi
- 6551 – Ichki (Sovietskyi)
- 6552 – Pervomaiske
- 6553 – Rozdolne
- 6554 – Bakhchysarai
- 6555 – Isliam-Terek (Kirovske)
- 6556 – Kurman (Krasnohvardiiske)
- 6557 – Yedy-Kuiu (Lenine)
- 6558 – Chornomorske
- 6559 – Bilohirsk
- 6560 – Alushta
- 6561 – Kerch
- 6562 – Feodosia
- 6563 – Saky
- 6564 – Dzhankoi
- 6565 – Yany Kapu (Krasnoperekopsk)
- 6566 – Sudak
- 6567 – Armiansk
- 6569 – Yevpatoria

Note: After the annexation by Russia, Crimea switched to the Russian telephone codes +7 978 for mobile phones and +7 365 for landlines on 7 May 2015. (Note: The status of the Crimea and of the city of Sevastopol is currently under dispute between Russia and Ukraine; Ukraine and the majority of the international community consider the Crimea to be an autonomous republic of Ukraine and Sevastopol to be one of Ukraine's cities with special status, while Russia, on the other hand, considers the Crimea to be a federal subject of Russia and Sevastopol to be one of Russia's three federal cities.)

=== 69 – Sevastopol ===
- 69 – Sevastopol

Note: After the annexation by Russia, Crimea switched to the Russian telephone codes +7 978 for mobile phones and +7 869 for landlines at Sevastopol on 7 May 2015.

== See also ==
- Telephone numbers in Ukraine
- Area codes
