= Salkove, Kirovohrad Oblast =

Rural locality in Kirovohrad Oblast, Ukraine

Salkove Салькове
- Rural settlement
- Location in Kirovohrad Oblast Location in Ukraine
- Coordinates: 48°15′45″N 29°59′03″E
- Country: Ukraine
- Oblast: Kirovohrad Oblast
- Raion: Holovanivsk Raion
- Hromada: Zavallia settlement hromada

Population (2022)
  - Total: 1,555
- Time zone: UTC+2 (EET)
  - Summer (DST): UTC+3 (EEST)

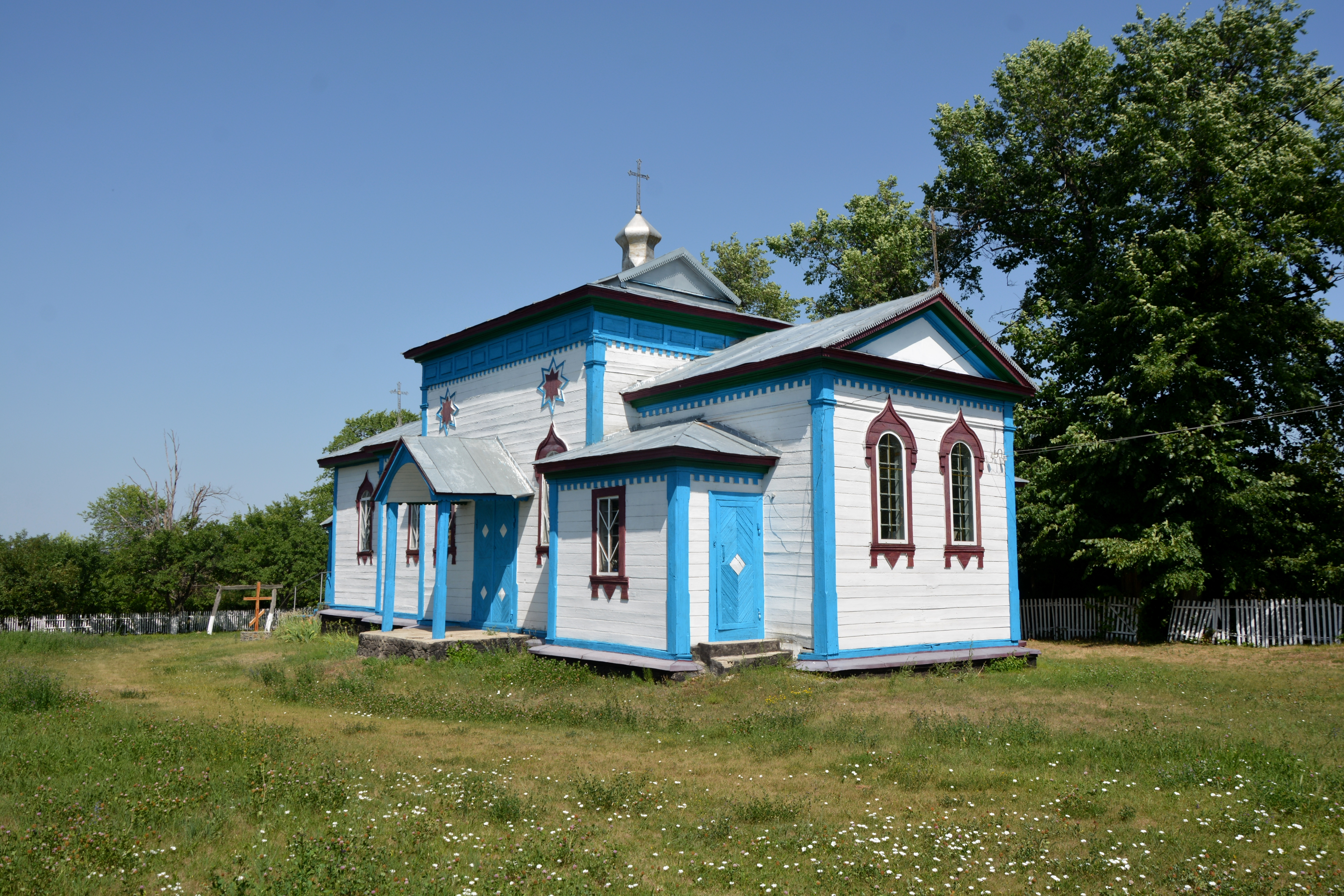
Church of Kosma and Damian, Haivoron district, Salkove, Ukraine.

Salkove (Ukrainian: Салькове; Russian: Сальково) is a rural settlement in Holovanivsk Raion of Kirovohrad Oblast in Ukraine. It is located on the left bank of the Southern Bug. Salkove belongs to Zavallia settlement hromada, one of the hromadas of Ukraine. Population: 1,555 (2022 estimate).

== History ==
Until 18 July 2020, Salkove belonged to Haivoron Raion. The raion was abolished in July 2020 as part of the administrative reform of Ukraine, which reduced the number of raions of Kirovohrad Oblast to four. The area of Haivoron Raion was merged into Holovanivsk Raion.

Until 26 January 2024, Salkove was designated urban-type settlement. On this day, a new law entered into force which abolished this status, and Salkove became a rural settlement.

== Economy ==
=== Transportation ===
The closest railway station, about 5 kilometres (3.1 mi) north of the settlement, is Khashchuvate. It is on the narrow gauge railway which connects Haivoron and Holovanivsk. The passenger traffic was discontinued in 2019, the station only serves by occasional tourist trains. As of 2021, the railway is in danger of being demolished.

The settlement is connected by road with Haivoron, Savran, and Balta. It has access to Highway M05 which connects Kyiv and Odesa.
