= Pobuzke =

Rural locality in Kirovohrad Oblast, Ukraine

Pobuzke Побузьке
- Rural settlement
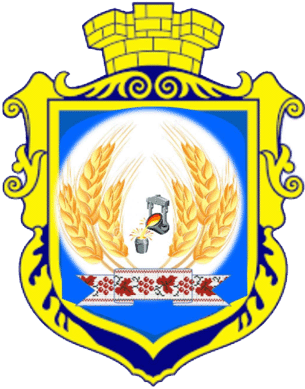
- Coat of arms

- Location in Kirovohrad Oblast Location in Ukraine
- Coordinates: 48°10′01″N 30°35′50″E
- Country: Ukraine
- Oblast: Kirovohrad Oblast
- Raion: Holovanivsk Raion
- Hromada: Pobuzke settlement hromada

Population (2022)
  - Total: 5,694
- Time zone: UTC+2 (EET)
  - Summer (DST): UTC+3 (EEST)

Pobuzke (Ukrainian: Побузьке; Russian: Побугское) is a rural settlement in Holovanivsk Raion of Kirovohrad Oblast in Ukraine. It is located on the left bank of the Southern Bug (hence the name), at the border with Mykolaiv Oblast. Pobuzke hosts the administration of Pobuzke settlement hromada, one of the hromadas of Ukraine. It had an estimated population of 5,694 (2022 estimate) in 2022.

Until 26 January 2024, Pobuzke was designated urban-type settlement. On this day, a new law entered into force which abolished this status, and Pobuzke became a rural settlement.

== Economy ==
Pobuzke Ferronickel Plant, a plant producing ferronickel, is located in the settlement.

=== Transportation ===
Nikel-Pobuzkyi railway station is located in the settlement. This is a cargo station serving the ferronickel plant. It is connected by railway with Pidhorodna. There is no passenger traffic.

Highway H24 which connects Holovanivsk and Pervomaisk runs close to the settlement.
