= Nebelivka =

Rural locality in Kirovohrad Oblast, Ukraine

Nebelivka Небелівка
- Village
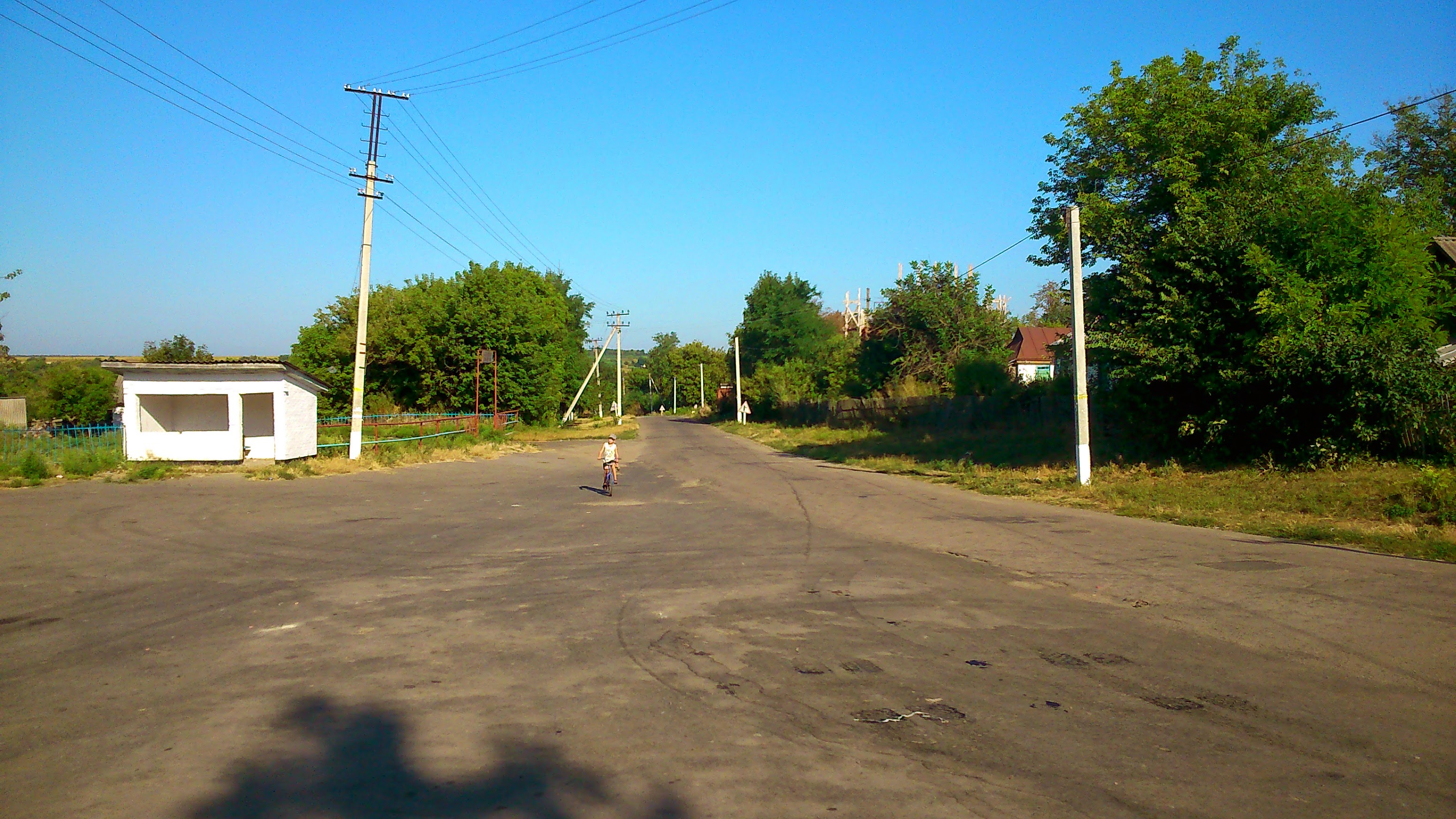
- Nebelivka village square

- Location within Ukraine
- Coordinates: 48.635278°N 30.581389°E
- Country: Ukraine
- Oblast: Kirovohrad Oblast
- Raion: Holovanivsk Raion
- Hromada: Pidvysoke rural hromada

Government
  - Village Head: Bobko Mikola Lukich
- Elevation: 162 m (531 ft)

Population (2001)
  - Total: 713
- Postal code: 26121
- Area code: +380 5255

Nebelivka (Ukrainian: Небелівка) is a village in Holovanivsk Raion, Kirovohrad Oblast, Ukraine. It belongs to Pidvysoke rural hromada, one of the hromadas of Ukraine. As of 2001, it had a population of 713.

A major archaeological site of the Neolithic Trypillia culture is located in the village. Dating to around 4,000 BCE, It was one of the largest settlements of the culture, covering an area of 260–300 hectares and home to up to 17,000 people. Other archaeological remains found in the village include a number of Bronze Age kurgans (3rd millennium BCE), evidence of Iron Age (2nd millennium BCE) and Chernyakhov culture (2nd–5th centuries CE) occupations, and pottery from the 17th and 18th century. In January 1920, the Black Zaporizhian cavalry regiment of the Ukrainian People's Army was stationed in the village as part of the First Winter Campaign.

Until 18 July 2020, Nebelivka belonged to Novoarkhanhelsk Raion. The raion was abolished in July 2020 as part of the administrative reform of Ukraine, which reduced the number of raions of Kirovohrad Oblast to four. The area of Novoarkhanhelsk Raion was merged into Holovanivsk Raion.
