= Golubovka =

Golubovka (Russian: Голубовка) may refer to several settlements:

- Golubovka, Fatezhsky District, Kursk Oblast
- Golubovka, Khomutovsky District, Kursk Oblast

== See also ==
- Holubivka (disambiguation)
