= Zavallia, Kirovohrad Oblast =

Rural locality in Kirovohrad Oblast, Ukraine

Zavallia Завалля
- Rural settlement
- Location in Kirovohrad Oblast Location in Ukraine
- Coordinates: 48°12′09″N 30°00′52″E
- Country: Ukraine
- Oblast: Kirovohrad Oblast
- Raion: Holovanivsk Raion
- Hromada: Zavallia settlement hromada

Population (2022)
  - Total: 4,433
- Time zone: UTC+2 (EET)
  - Summer (DST): UTC+3 (EEST)

Zavallia (Ukrainian: Завалля; Russian: Завалье) is a rural settlement in Holovanivsk Raion of Kirovohrad Oblast in Ukraine. It is located on the left bank of the Southern Bug. Zavallia hosts the administration of Zavallia settlement hromada, one of the hromadas of Ukraine. Population: 4,433 (2022 estimate).

== History ==
Until 18 July 2020, Zavallia belonged to Haivoron Raion. The raion was abolished in July 2020 as part of the administrative reform of Ukraine, which reduced the number of raions of Kirovohrad Oblast to four. The area of Haivoron Raion was merged into Holovanivsk Raion.

Until 26 January 2024, Zavallia was designated urban-type settlement. On this day, a new law entered into force which abolished this status, and Zavallia became a rural settlement.

== Economy ==
=== Transportation ===
The settlement is connected by road with Haivoron and Savran. It has access to Highway M05 which connects Kyiv and Odesa.

=== Mining ===
The Zavallia mine is one of the largest graphite mines in Ukraine and in the world. The mine is located in the center of the country in Kirovohrad Oblast. The mine has estimated reserves of 6.4 million tonnes of ore 7% graphite.
