= Pidhorodna =

Rural locality in Mykolaiv Oblast, Ukraine

Pidhorodna Підгородна
- Rural settlement
- Location within Mykolaiv Oblast
- Coordinates: 48°6′35″N 30°53′9″E
- Country: Ukraine
- Oblast: Mykolaiv Oblast
- Raion: Pervomaisk Raion

Population (2022)
  - Total: 2,150
- Time zone: UTC+2 (EET)
  - Summer (DST): UTC+3 (EEST)

Pidhorodna (Ukrainian: Підгородна, Russian: Подгородная) is a rural settlement in Pervomaisk Raion, Mykolaiv Oblast, Ukraine. It belongs to Pervomaisk urban hromada, one of the hromadas of Ukraine. Population: 2,150 (2022 estimate).

The settlement is located on the left bank of the Siniukha River, a left tributary of the Southern Bug, about 3 kilometres (1.9 mi) from the river.

== History ==
Pidhorodna railway station was built in 1899. It belonged to Yelisavetgradsky Uyezd of Kherson Governorate. On 16 April 1920, Kherson Governorate was renamed Nikolayev Governorate, and on 21 October 1922, it was merged into Odessa Governorate. In 1923, uyezds in Ukrainian Soviet Socialist Republic were abolished, and the governorates were divided into okruhas. Bohopil Raion of Pervomaisk Okruha was established, and Pidhorodna railway station was included into Bohopil Raion. In 1925, the governorates were abolished, and okruhas were directly subordinated to Ukrainian SSR. In 1927, Bohopil Raion was renamed Pervomaisk Raion. In 1930, okruhas were abolished, and raions were directly subordinated to Ukrainian SSR. On 27 February 1932, Odessa Oblast was established, and Pervomaisk Raion was included into Odessa Oblast. On 17 February 1954, Pervomaisk Raion was transferred to Mykolaiv Oblast.

In 1960, Pidhorodna was granted urban-type settlement status. On 26 January 2024, a new law entered into force which abolished the status of urban-type settlement status, and Pidhorodna became a rural settlement.

== Economy ==
=== Transportation ===
Pidhorodna has a railway station which is connected by three lines with Haivoron, Pomichna, and Podilsk (via Pervomaisk).

Pidhorodna railway station was built in 1909 as a part of narrow-gauge railway line connecting Zhytomyr and Olviopil (currently part of Pervomaisk). The stretch to Olviopil was completed in 1907. In the 1980s, a stretch of the standard gauge railway between Holovanivsk and Pidhorodna was built. It was parallel to the existing narrow-gauge stretch. The latter one was closed in 2001 for passenger traffic and subsequently demolished.
