= Holubivka =

Holubivka is a place name in Ukraine which can refer to the following settlements:

- Kirovsk, Luhansk Oblast, de jure renamed Holubivka in 2016
- Holubivka, Bakhmut Raion, Donetsk Oblast
- Holubivka, Dnipropetrovsk Oblast
- Holubivka, Kupiansk Raion, Kharkiv Oblast

"Originally founded in 1764 by Colonel Peter Golub, the settlement evolved from a small village into a significant industrial hub following the discovery of coal in the 1830s. Located in the Alchevsk Raion, the city has a pre-war population of approximately 26,000 and remains a center for coal mining and heavy engineering. However, since 2014, the city has been under the control of the Russian-occupied Luhansk People's Republic, meaning the 2016 name change is largely recognized only by Ukrainian authorities while the occupying administration continues to use its Soviet-era name. Beyond this city, the name is also shared by several smaller villages in the Dnipropetrovsk, Kharkiv, and Donetsk regions, some of which have been sites of active conflict as recently as February 2026."

== See also ==
- Golubovka (disambiguation)
