= Vilshanka =

Rural locality in Kirovohrad Oblast, Ukraine

Vilshanka Вільшанка
- Rural settlement
- Location in Kirovohrad Oblast Location in Ukraine
- Coordinates: 48°13′58″N 30°53′00″E
- Country: Ukraine
- Oblast: Kirovohrad Oblast
- Raion: Holovanivsk Raion
- Hromada: Vilshanka settlement hromada

Population (2022)
  - Total: 4,526
- Time zone: UTC+2 (EET)
  - Summer (DST): UTC+3 (EEST)

Vilshanka (Ukrainian: Вільшанка, Russian: Ольшанка) is a rural settlement in Holovanivsk Raion of Kirovohrad Oblast in Ukraine. It is located on the left bank of the Syniukha, a left tributary of the Southern Bug. Vilshanka hosts the administration of Vilshanka settlement hromada, one of the hromadas of Ukraine. Population: 4,526 (2022 estimate).

== History ==
Until 18 July 2020, Vilshanka was the administrative center of Vilshanka Raion. The raion was abolished in July 2020 as part of the administrative reform of Ukraine, which reduced the number of raions of Kirovohrad Oblast to four. The area of Vilshanka Raion was merged into Holovanivsk Raion.

Until 26 January 2024, Vilshanka was designated urban-type settlement. On this day, a new law entered into force which abolished this status, and Vilshanka became a rural settlement.

== Demographics ==
As of the 2001 Ukrainian census, Vilshanka had a population of 5,670 inhabitants. The linguistic composition of the settlement was as follows:

Native languages in Vilshanka
	percent
Ukrainian	91.2%
Bulgarian	3.9%
Russian	3.3%
Armenian	1.3%
Romanian	0.1%
others	0.2%

== Economy ==
=== Transportation ===
The settlement has road access to Pervomaisk and from there to Highway H24 connecting Holovanivsk and Mykolaiv.

The closest railway station is in Pervomaisk on the railway connecting Kropyvnytskyi with Vinnytsia and Odesa.
