= Vilshanka Raion =

Former subdivision of Kirovohrad Oblast, Ukraine

Vilshanka Raion Вільшанський район
- Raion
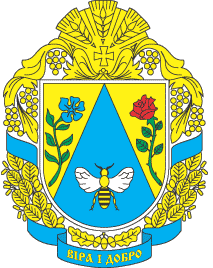
- Flag Coat of arms

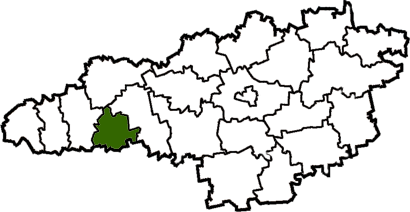
- Coordinates: 48°17′6″N 30°51′40″E
- Country: Ukraine
- Region: Kirovohrad Oblast
- Established: 1919
- Disestablished: 18 July 2020
- Admin. center: Vilshanka
- Subdivisions: List: 0 — city councils; 1 — settlement councils; 14 — rural councils; Number of localities: 0 — cities; 1 — urban-type settlements; 24 — villages; — rural settlements

Government
  - Governor: Genadiy Ivanov

Area
  - Total: 645 km^{2} (249 sq mi)

Population (2020)
  - Total: 12,003 ▼
  - Density: 18.6/km^{2} (48.2/sq mi)
- Time zone: UTC+02:00 (EET)
  - Summer (DST): UTC+03:00 (EEST)
- Postal index: 26600—26633
- Area code: +380 5250

Vilshanka Raion was a raion (district) of Kirovohrad Oblast in central Ukraine. The administrative center of the raion was the urban-type settlement of Vilshanka. The raion was abolished on 18 July 2020 as part of the administrative reform of Ukraine, which reduced the number of raions of Kirovohrad Oblast to four. The area of Vilshanka Raion was merged into Holovanivsk Raion. The last estimate of the raion population was 12,003 (2020 est.).

At the time of disestablishment, the raion consisted of one hromada, Vilshanka settlement hromada with the administration in Vilshanka.
