= Sidor Belarsky =

- Born: Isidor Livshitz; December 27, 1898; Kryzhopil, Ukraine
- Died: 7 June 1975 (aged 76)
- Education: Petersburg State Conservatory
- Occupation: Opera singer (basso)
- Spouse(s): Clarunia (Oct. 17, 1900-Feb. 21, 1980)
- Children: Isabel

Sidor Belarsky, born Isidor Livshitz (December 27, 1898 (Note: Belarsky's Social Security record gives his birth date as December 27, 1898, which is also the date on his US naturalization record and various Brazilian immigration cards. His age cited in his obituary, 76, also corresponds to this birthdate. His gravestone has the birthdate February 23, 1900.) – June 7, 1975), was an internationally recognized American opera singer, educator and interpreter of Judaic folk songs, Chassidic Nigunim and Judaic cantorial music

== Biography ==
External audio
- You may hear Sidor Belarsky performing Judaic songs Here on fau.edu
- You may hear Sidor Belarsky performing in "Seder Nights with Sidor Belarsky" Here on soundcloud.com

Sidor Belarsky was born to a Jewish family in Kryzhopil, Ukraine. He emigrated with his wife Clarunia and daughter Isabel to the United States in February 1930 or 1931. Initially, his family was automatically detained at Ellis Island since the United States did not maintain diplomatic relations with the Soviet Union at that time.

Belarsky first pursued musical studies at the Odessa Conservatory and in Berlin. He later graduated from the State Conservatory at Leningrad in 1929 and soon emerged as a soloist with the Kirov Opera company as well as a leading basso with the Leningrad State Opera Company.

After arriving in the United States in 1930 while on a concert tour, he was invited by Franklin S. Harris to join the faculty at Brigham Young University, where taught vocal music from 1930-1933. He was also on the faculty at the University of Utah. He soon established residency in Los Angeles from 1932-1936 where he concertized with the Los Angeles Symphony at the Hollywood Bowl in productions of Boris Godunov and Eugene Onegin. While in Los Angeles he also founded the American Opera Company. He later acquired a faculty position as Professor of Music at the Jewish Teachers Seminary - Herzliah Institute in New York City while continuing to concertize in Europe, the Middle East, Canada and South America.

Throughout his career, Belarsky concertized extensively in the United States as a leading basso with several operatic companies including: Chicago Civic Opera, San Francisco Opera, the American Opera Company of Los Angeles and the New York City Center Opera in a production of Tosca in 1944. In South America, he also appeared at Teatro Municipal in Rio De Janeiro and Teatro Colon in Buenos Aires. During the 1949-1950 concert season, Belarsky also toured extensively in South Africa and Israel performing a repertoire of Jewish folk music.

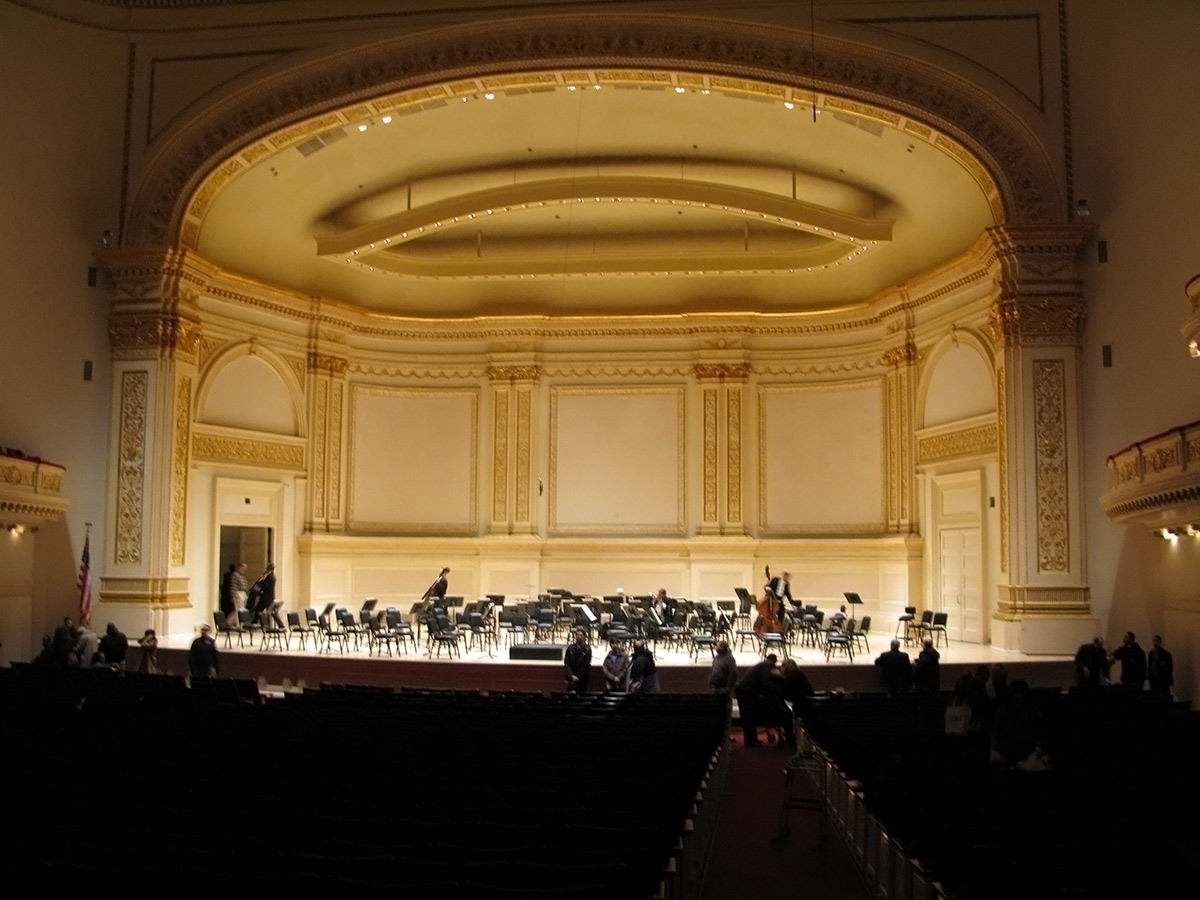
Carnegie Hall

He appeared as a concert soloist at New York City's Carnegie Hall in over 22 solo performances between 1931 and 1961 and also appeared with the NBC Symphony Orchestra under the direction of Arturo Toscannini in a performance of Beethoven's opera Fidelio. By 1944 Belarsky also emerged in the Broadway Theatre as a member of the cast in the revival of several operas by Giacomo Puccini at the Center Theatre including: La Tosca and La Boheme. As part of his encore presentations in the concert hall, Belarsky often included the work "Mayn rueh plats" ("My quiet place") by the poet Morris Rosenfeld.

Along with many leading cantors of his time, Belarsky concertized in an effort to raise funds for the Zionist cause as the oppression of the Nazi regime in Germany accelerated in the 1930s. In 1948 Belarsky performed in Israel while celebrating its founding and contributed to the documentary film Shalom Israel in 1951. His recording of "Dem Milners Trern" ("The Miller's Tears"), a Yiddish folk song composed by M. M. Warshavsky, was featured in the Coen brothers's film, A Serious Man. The song's subject is the expulsion of Jews from hundreds of villages in Czarist Russia. In 1954 he performed in a concert sponsored by the Association to Perpetuate the Memory of Ukrainian Jews before a packed house at New York City's Town Hall. During the 1957-1958 concert season he emerged once again in South Africa in recitals of Yiddish and Hebrew songs.

External audio
- Your may hear Sidor Belarsky with the Mischa Borr Orchestra and John Serry in "Dark Night" in 1947; Here on library.wisc.edu

During the 1940s Belarsky also recorded several popular Ukrainian/Russian folk songs in collaboration with the accordionist John Serry and the Mischa Borr Orchestra for the RCA Victor label which included: "Dark Night (# 26-5037, 1946) by Nikita Bogoslovsky, "By the Cradle" (# 26-5035, 1946) by Aleksandre Alekseevich Olenin, "Katusha" (# 26-5035, 1946) by Hy Zaret and "Hobo Song" (aka "Mother") (# 26-5037, 1946) by Valerii Viktorovich Zhelobinsky.

Belarsky's recordings of Judaic folk songs were made on several labels including RCA Victor, Artistic Enterprises and Besa Records.

Along with Jan Peerce and Richard Tucker, Sidor Belodsky has been credited with helping to keep Yiddish folk songs alive both onstage and in recordings during the 20th century. His admirers included several leading Jewish intellectuals including: Albert Einstein, President Zalman Shazar of Israel and Eli Wiesel.

== Death ==
External image
- Image of Sidor & Clarunia Belarsky's gravestones Here on findagrave.com

Sidor Belarsky died at the age of 77 in 1975 at North Shore Hospital in Manhasset, Long Island in New York.

== Performance style ==
Sidor Belarsky received critical acclaim for his performances as an operatic basso baritone. The Billboard magazine noted that his performance with the Mischa Borr Orchestra exemplified a resonant, exhilarating voice within a wide tonal range which reflected a true expression of Russian folk music.

It has also been observed that Belarsky utilized his classical training as an operatic basso to interpret Yiddhish folk songs and Jewish art music with a finely controlled approach. This seriousness of tone and classical formality differentiates his work from performances typically found in the traditional Yiddhish musical theater and the synagogue. His vocal warmth and musicality is said to have struck a chord with American Jews of multiple generations.

== Discography ==
Sidor Belarsky's extensive discography includes over 75 recordings of Judaic folk songs including:

- Forward 70th Anniversary: Sidor Belarsky Sings of the Hopes and Dreams of the East Side, Lazar Weiner, piano. Artistic Enterprises, Inc. (c. 1967) (presented by the Forward Association and The Workmen's Circle)
- Seder Nights With Sidor Belarsky - Artistic Enterprises Inc (# B-112) Sidor Belarsky performing songs for the Seder.
- Songs of the Steppes - RCA Victor (S-49, 1947) - Sidor Belarsky performs Russian folk music with the Miscah Borr Orcheatra.
- Dem Milner's Trern - Victor (9043, 1938) & RCA Victor (25-5010, 1947) - Sidor Belarsky performs this Judaic folk song.

== Archived works ==
External audio
- Your may hear Sidor Belarsky singing "Shir Hashamisha" by Mordechai Zeira in 1939; Here on ucsb.edu

- The National Library of Israel has archived Belarsky's album Seder Nights With Sidor Belarsky which is available via online streaming.
- The Dartmouth Jewish Sound Archive at Dartmouth College has archived several of Belarsky's performances of music for Chanuka.
- The Special Collections Department of the Florida Atlantic University Library has archived Belarsky's performances of Judaic songs which are accessible through online streaming in the university's Recorded Sound Archives
- The Discography of American Historical Recordings at the University of California, Santa Barbara has archived master recordings of performances by Sidor Belarsky collaborating with the accordionist John Serry and the Mischa Borr Orchestra .
- The Brigham Young University Library has archived papers, photographs and recordings by Sidor Belarsky from the years 1900-1986 within the L. Tom Perry Special Collections

== Filmography ==
- A Serious Man (2009) - As a performer singing the Yiddish song "Dem Milners Trern" ("The Millers Tears") by M. M. Warshavsky.

== See also ==
Secular Jewish music
Jewish music
Jewish art music
