= Vladimir Gelfand =

Soviet diarist and soldier (1923–1983)

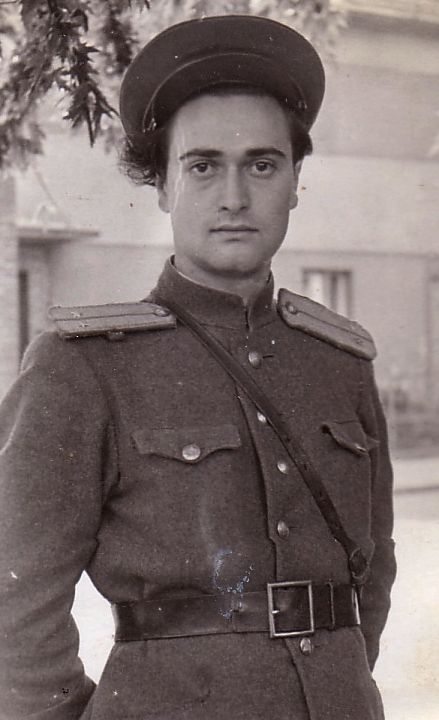
- Gelfand in Germany, 1945
- Born: March 1, 1923; Novoarkhanhelsk, Elisavetgrad uezd, Kherson Governorate, Russian Empire
- Died: November 25, 1983 (aged 60); Dnepropetrovsk, Ukrainian SSR, Soviet Union
- Occupation: Memoirist
- Writing career
- Genre: Memoirs
- Subject: Realism

Vladimir Natanovich Gelfand (Russian: Владимир Натанович Гельфанд) (March 1, 1923 – November 25, 1983) was a diarist and Soviet soldier in World War II.

He is known as the author of the diaries from the years 1941–1946 which were published in Germany, Sweden and Russia. The book with the diary entries of the officer in the Red Army Vladimir Gelfand: German Diary 1945–1946 (Deutschland-Tagebuch 1945–1946) – Notations of a Soldier in the Red Army has become the first one which is published in Germany.

== Biography ==
=== Childhood and youth ===
Vladimir Gelfand was the only child in a poor Jewish family. Vladimir's mother, Nadezhda Vladimirovna Gorodynskaya (1902–1982), was from a low-income family with eight children. In her youth, she earned money by giving private lessons. In 1917, she joined the RSDLP (b) and, as Vladimir mentioned in his biography, took part in the Civil War. In the 1920s, she was expelled from the party on charges of "passivity". This interfered with her career, but saved her from subsequent repressions. Father, Nathan Solomonovich Gelfand (1894–1974), worked at a cement plant in Dneprodzerzhinsk. Unlike his wife, he remained non-partisan.

In 1926, in search of a livelihood, the young family moved to the Caucasus. Vladimir and his parents settled in Essentuki, where his father's parents lived, but already in 1928 returned to Ukraine in the city of Dneprodzerzhinsk, Dnipropetrovsk region. Here, his father worked as a foreman at a metallurgical plant and, according to Vladimir's diaries, was an "exemplary worker". Mother was a teacher in a factory kindergarten, which Vladimir, among other children, went to. In 1932, she changed jobs, moving to the personnel department of a large metallurgical enterprise. In 1933, the family moved to Dnepropetrovsk.

Gelfand's parents divorced when he was in school. Nevertheless, he studied successfully. During his school years he took an active part in public life: he was an editor of the wall newspaper, an organizer of art recitation contests, an agitator-propagandist, and joined the Komsomol. After high school, Gelfand entered the Dnepropetrovsk Industrial Workers' Faculty (now the National Metallurgical Academy of Ukraine), having managed to study there three courses before the war.

=== Years of war ===
The German attack on the Soviet Union interrupted the formation of Gelfand. When enterprises, public institutions and a significant part of the city's population were evacuated in August 1941, Gelfand moved to Yessentuki, where he settled with his aunt, his father's sister. In Essentuki, Gelfand worked as an electrician and had reservation armor. Nevertheless, in April 1942 he turned to the draft board and on May 6 became a member of the Red Army. He was trained at an artillery school near Maykop in the western Caucasus and received the military rank of sergeant.

In July 1942, when the Caucasian oil fields became the direct target of the German offensive, Gelfand was on the southern flank of the Kharkov Front (as he writes in his Diary, entry dated 06.16.1942) as commander of the mortar squad. The unit in which Gelfand served retreated with the army to the Rostov area. In mid-July, his unit was surrounded and destroyed. As part of a small group of soldiers, Gelfand managed to break out of encirclement and join the units of the 62nd Army under the command of Vasily Chuikov, who fought in Stalingrad. Sergeant Gelfand, being the commander of the mortar squad, was simultaneously appointed deputy platoon commander for political work. He wrote a statement on joining the Communist Party and became a candidate for its members.

Towards the end of 1942, hostilities in the Stalingrad region were nearing victory. In December, Gelfand was wounded in the arm and ended up in a military hospital near Saratov, where he stayed until February 1943. After discharge, he received a referral to the rifle school of officers near Rostov, liberated from the Germans.

In the summer of 1943, Gelfand managed to re-establish contact with his mother, who was evacuated to Central Asia. From her letter, he learned that almost all of his paternal relatives in Essentuki occupied by the Nazis - grandmother, uncle, two aunts and two cousins - were killed during an action to exterminate the Jews. Only his father and father's brother survived, who, before the Germans arrived, managed to escape to Derbent, crossing the Caucasus ridge.

Gelfand underwent a three-month training in the courses of officers and received the military rank of junior lieutenant. At the end of August 1943, he was transferred to the 248th Infantry Division, where he took command of a mortar platoon. In the fall of 1943, the 248th Infantry Division became part of the 3rd Ukrainian Front and took up positions south of Melitopol. At the end of January 1944, Gelfand received the rank of lieutenant. Since November 1943, he became a full member of the CPSU(B).

In the fall of 1943, Gelfand participated in crossing the Dnieper. In early May 1944, part of it crossed the Dniester near Grigoriopol. A new offensive in the southern part of the front led Gelfand in Bessarabia in August 1944. Columns of prisoners of war and captive traitors (Vlasovites) were increasingly found. In the diary, he describes the hatred of the Red Army towards the prisoners, especially in relation to the traitors.

In the fall of 1944, his unit was located in Poland east of Warsaw. The diary is filled with notes on meetings with the Polish civilian population. At the beginning of 1945, the Red Army was preparing for two strong offensive operations: an attack on the Vistula-Oder and an attack on East Prussia. To this end, more than 3 million Soviet soldiers were reorganized and supplied. The battle was to end with the encirclement of Berlin. The Red Army was opposed by the still powerful enemy, which was ready at the borders of its country for stubborn resistance. On January 12 and 13, the Soviet army went on the offensive.

In 1945, Gelfand served in the 1052th Infantry Regiment of the 301st Division. Since October 1944, the 301st Division belonged to the 5th Army of Colonel General Berzarin within the 1st Belorussian Front, commanded by Army General Zhukov. Gelfand received command of a mortar platoon in the 3rd battalion. On the morning of January 14, 1945, an offensive began south of Warsaw on the Pilice River. After 2 weeks, the 1052 rifle regiment reached the German border, broken in 1939 by the Wehrmacht. Gelfand's diary entries indicate fatigue, but also pride and the expectation of victory.

In early February 1945, part of it from the north advanced on the western shore of the Oder. In the memoirs of the division commander, Colonel Antonov, it is reported that the 3rd battalion of the 1052th rifle regiment was supposed to reflect the enemy's particularly cruel counterattacks. In anticipation of the Berlin operation, Gelfand was appointed to the headquarters of Antonov's 301st division to maintain the Journal of Military Operations. In mid-April, the 301st division, located in Kustrin, went on the offensive on Berlin. Gelfand independently visited the fighting positions of units and divisions of the division. In late April, Gelfand took part in the assault on Berlin as part of the 301st Infantry Division.

=== After the war ===
After the Victory, Gelfand hoped for dismissal from the army. However, he was not demobilized neither in the first wave of demobilization (in accordance with the decree of June 23, 1945), nor in the second wave (in accordance with the decree of September 25, 1945). In June 1945, Gelfand did not have a specific task. When the looting of the Science Library began, he considered it "shameful barbarism" (entry dated June 16/17). In early July, he arrived on the board of an officer reserve near the village of Rüders. During this period, Gelfand tried to get the post of political worker or (after language courses) translator.

In August 1945, when the USSR declared war on Japan, Gelfand predicted an imminent victory in this war, while many of his colleagues feared that the war in the Far East would last several months or even years.

In October 1945, Gelfand was assigned to the Materials and Equipment Base in Kremmen, northwest of Berlin, which was assigned to the 21st Independent Trophy Brigade. The base's transport department initially consisted of three (in early 1946), then six officers, as well as technical staff from sergeants. Lieutenant Gelfand manned consignments of various goods in the Soviet units and accompanied them, organized the transportation and dismantling of restitution property. During his work, he was constantly between Nauen, Potsdam, Velten, Kremmen, Hennigsdorf, Schönewalde, Fürstenberg and Berlin. At the beginning of 1946, he was briefly appointed head of production at the Kremennsky sawmill, where six soldiers and two horse teams were subordinate to him. In addition, he had to take guard at the Base. His salary was 750 rubles. At the end of 1945, in Ukraine (at that time), a kilogram of sugar in the market cost 250 rubles, a kilogram of rye bread on average 24 rubles, so Gelfand, who sent money to his mother, was her weak helper. There he served until demobilization in September 1946.

In July 1946, he applied for leave. Together with his parents, he resorted to a trick: medical certificates were sent to the command about the poor state of health of the mother, the plight of the family was dramatized. Mother even wrote a letter to Stalin. But he was not granted leave.

On September 10, 1946, Gelfand was demobilized. He returned to Dnepropetrovsk to his mother. In September 1947, he began his studies at the Faculty of History and Philology of Dnepropetrovsk State University. In February 1949, he married a girl whom he had known since studying at school and during the war was in correspondence with her. Berta Davidovna Koifman finished her studies at the Molotov (since 1958 Perm) medical institute. In the summer of 1949, Gelfand transferred to Molotov (since 1958 Perm) State University. In 1950, son Alexander was born.

In 1952, Gelfand graduated from Molotov University. He wrote a thesis on the novel by Ilya Ehrenburg "The Tempest" (1947). In February 1951, Gelfand met with Ilya Ehrenburg in Moscow. Since August 1952, Gelfand worked as a teacher of history, the Russian language and literature at the Zheleznodorozhniki College No. 2 in Molotov. Soon the marriage with Berta was in crisis. In 1955, Gelfand left his wife and son and returned to Dnepropetrovsk, where he joined the city Technical College as a teacher.

In 1957, Gelfand met with a graduate of the Institute of Pedagogical Education of Makhachkala, Bella Efimovna Shulman. In August 1958, Gelfand divorced his first wife and soon married Shulman. Two sons were born from this marriage: in 1959 - Gennady, in 1963 - Vitaliy. Despite a higher pedagogical education, Shulman was not able to get a teaching position in high school, which Shulman attributed to latent, partially even open antisemitism. "As long as I am here as a school district council," said one head, "no Jew will work in high school." Thus, Shulman with higher education worked in kindergarten, and Gelfand remained his whole life a teacher of social science, history and political economy in vocational schools, first in the 12th, and since 1977 in the 21st city of Dnepropetrovsk.

Gelfand remained an active member of the party, took part in the work of the party group of the school. Fierce discussions took place there from time to time. Antisemitic insults, even from colleagues, were not uncommon. Gelfand wrote continuously. Gelfand offered the local press not only articles about school workdays and work results, but also his memories of the war. The late seventies became his most productive. The collection of newspaper publications covers 7 articles from 1968, 20 from 1976, 30 from 1978. They appeared in Ukrainian and Russian in local party newspapers and Komsomol newspapers, as well as in newspapers for builders.

Living conditions remained difficult. For more than 10 years, the Gelfand family of four has rented a private living space.

== Reviews of his books ==
"These are very private, uncensored experiences and sentiments of a Red Army Officer as an occupier of Germany. His account of the end of World War II in Germany and the German society that underwent its post-war crisis is also highly instructive. Apart from offering a different view on the spirit and the moral condition of the Red Army which was often represented in an exaggeratedly glorifying manner in the Soviet media, the diary contradicts to the commonly held belief that explains the military success of the Red Army by systematic repressions. Furthermore, the diary depicts the growing self-confidence of the front soldiers Stalin was so afraid of. Gelfand represents a certain group among the conquerors, namely the young officers who were sure that their front experience gave them the right to laugh at a dull instructor, to avert denunciation, to speak plainly to a high-ranged party functionary or to go their own way in occupied Germany. Gelfand’s experience with women also proves the existence of love relations between masculine conquerors and feminine conquered in 1945–46. The diary illustrates that German women searched contact to Soviet soldiers on their part, too, and that not only for material matters or in need of protection."

Dr. Elke Scherstjanoi, Institute of Contemporary History (IfZ), Munich-Berlin

"A Diary of a Soviet Soldier—it is the description of reality that makes it so impressive, a reality that had been disclaimed for a long time and of everyday life that had never been depicted. Despite all atrocities it is a very interesting book to read, though it appeared many years after it had been written. It is most gratifying that this diary eventually became available after 60 years, even if only in German yet, because this is a view of the events that was missing. This diary is the first book that presents Soviet vanquishers as flesh and blood people and helps to understand the inner world of Soviet soldiers. It will be difficult for Putin and his post-soviet guards to lock up this diary into the poison cupboard for anti-Russian propaganda."

Per Landin, Dagens Nyheter, Sweden

"Vladimir Gelfand’s German Diary 1945–1946 is remarkable in many ways. It is an unusual eyewitness account of the Red Army’s liberation of Poland and eastern Germany. Readers have reason to be grateful to Gelfand simply because he diligently kept a diary despite the Red Army’s prohibition, presumably imposed for security reasons. […] For all its shortcomings, the diary may serve as something of a counterweight to historical revisionists who seek to portray humanity’s victory over Hitler’s fascism as a brutal assault by Stalin’s hordes on Western civilisation."

Stefan Lindgren, Flamman, Sweden

"Among the many eye-witness accounts of the end of World War 2 in Germany to emerge in the anniversary year of 2005 was the diary of a young Red Army lieutenant who participated in the capture of Berlin and remained in that city until September 1946. Gelfand’s Deutschland-Tagebuch was the subject of widespread media interest with commentators generally agreed that his account forces a review of existing German narratives of the fall of Berlin and the perceived relationship of the Soviet occupiers to the German population at this time."

Anne Boden, Trinity College Dublin, Bradford Conference on Contemporary German Literature

"The Young Lieutenant’s Diary. This is a review of Vladimir Gelfand’s Deutschland-Tagebuch 1945–1946 which presents a unique insight both into the Red Army during the decisive battles for Berlin and into the German society of the period immediately following liberation. Gelfand, a Lieutenant of Jewish-Ukrainian origin, served from May 1945 until his demobilization in September 1946 at various locations around Berlin. His diary also permits a very intimate view into his personal actions, his feelings and his reflections."

Wolfram Adolphi, UTOPIE kreativ, Rosa Luxemburg Foundation

== Other ==
- Various items from the personal collection of Vladimir Gelfand – including letters, documents, war trophies, and other artifacts – were donated to the Deutsch-Russisches Museum Berlin-Karlshorst in 2007.
- The originals of the Diary and Letters 1941—1946, photographs, certificates, documents, and other items from the personal collection of the family of Vladimir Gelfand were donated in 2014 to the Jewish Museum and Tolerance Center in Moscow, Russia.
- The originals of the Diary and Letters 1947—1983, photo albums, certificates, documents, and other items from the personal collection of the family of Vladimir Gelfand were donated in 2020 to the Museum "Memory of the Jewish People and the Holocaust in Ukraine" in Dnipro, Ukraine.

== His books ==
- 2002 — Publishing bbb battert-Verlag Baden-Baden, Germany, Tagebuch 1941—1946 (ISBN 3-87989-360-8)
- 2005 — Publishing Aufbau-Verlag Berlin, Germany, Deutschland Tagebuch 1945—1946 (ISBN 3-351-02596-3)
- 2006 — Publishing Ersatz Stockholm, Sweden, Tysk dagbok 1945—46 (ISBN 91-88858-21-9)
- 2008 — Publishing Aufbau-Tb-Verlag Berlin, Germany, Deutschland Tagebuch 1945—1946 (ISBN 3-74668-155-3)
- 2012 — Publishing Ersatz-E-book Stockholm, Sweden, Tysk dagbok 1945—46 (ISBN 9789186437831)
- 2015 — Publishing Rosspen Moscow, Russia, Владимир Гельфанд. Дневник 1941–1946 (ISBN 978-5-8243-1983-5); Publishing Knizhniki (ISBN 978-5-9953-0395-4)
- 2016 — Publishing Rosspen Moscow, Russia, Владимир Гельфанд. Дневник 1941–1946 (ISBN 978-5-8243-2023-7); Publishing Knizhniki (ISBN 978-5-9953-0437-1)
