= Nebelivka (archaeological site) =

Large archaeological settlement in Ukraine dating to 4000 BC

- Небелівка (Ukrainian)
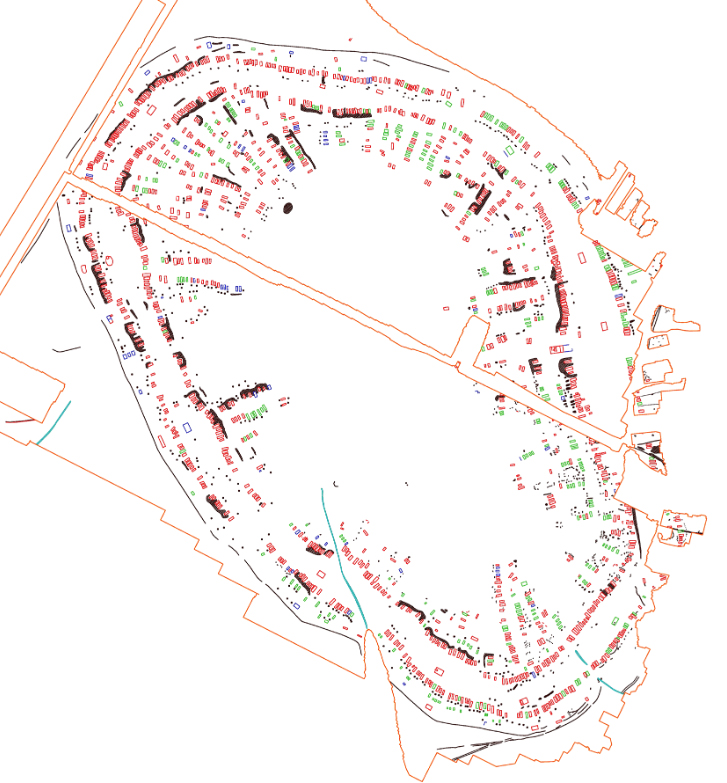
- Nebelivka settlement ground plan

- Location within Ukraine
- 48°38′33″N 30°33′27″E
- Type: Ancient mega-settlement
- Cultures: Cucuteni-Trypillian
- Location: Nebelivka , Ukraine

Site notes
- Area: 260 to 300 ha (640 to 740 acres)

Nebelivka (Ukrainian: Небелівка; Russian: Небеловка, romanized: Nebelovka), located in the village of Nebelivka in Kirovohrad Oblast, Ukraine, is the site of an ancient mega-settlement dating back to 4000 B.C. belonging to the Cucuteni-Trypillian culture. The settlement was for the time huge, covering an area of 260-300 hectares. It was the home to perhaps 15,000 to 17,000 people.

== Description ==
The Nebelivka archaeological site, located in the village of Nebelivka in Kirovohrad Oblast, Ukraine, is the site of an ancient mega-settlement dating back to 4000 B.C. belonging to the Cucuteni-Trypillian culture. The settlement was for the time huge, covering an area of 260-300 hectares. It was the home to perhaps 15,000 to 17,000 people.

The settlement within the boundary ditch includes over 1200 structures. Research from 2012–2014 implies "the possibility of state-level societies", contemporary with similar developments in Uruk. Mega-structures "suggest the presence of public buildings for meetings or ceremonies".

== Temple ==
A two-storey structure 60 by 20 metres (197 ft × 66 ft) of mud and wood with a galleried courtyard has been excavated. Its structure and contents indicate it was a major temple. Artefacts include female or Venus figurines, pottery stylised faces, charred bones of animals, and small gold pieces that were perhaps hair or clothing ornaments. It has eight clay platforms, perhaps altars, and the floors and walls of all five rooms on the upper floor were "decorated by red paint, which created [a] ceremonial atmosphere."

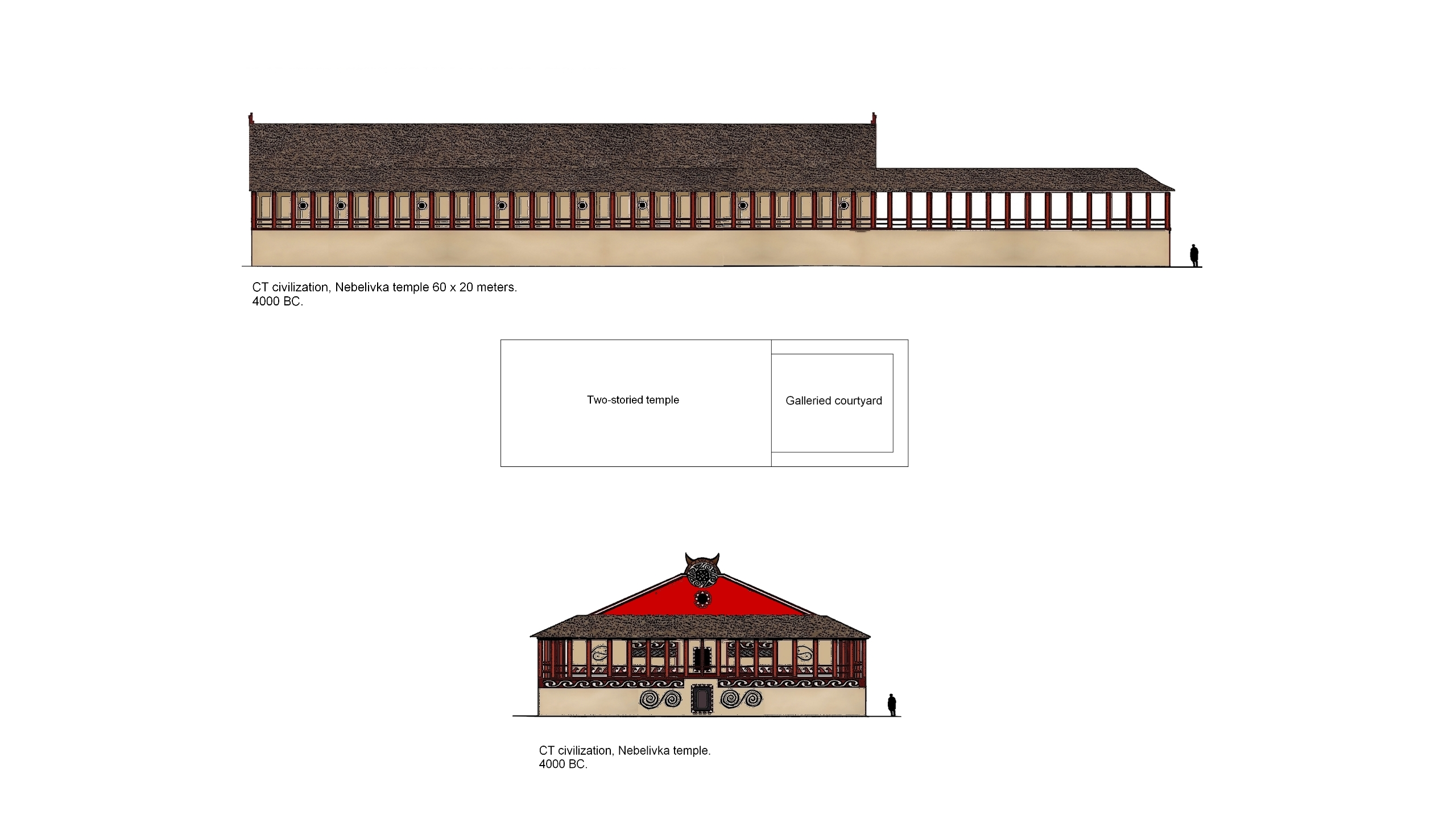
Nebelivka temple, reconstruction.

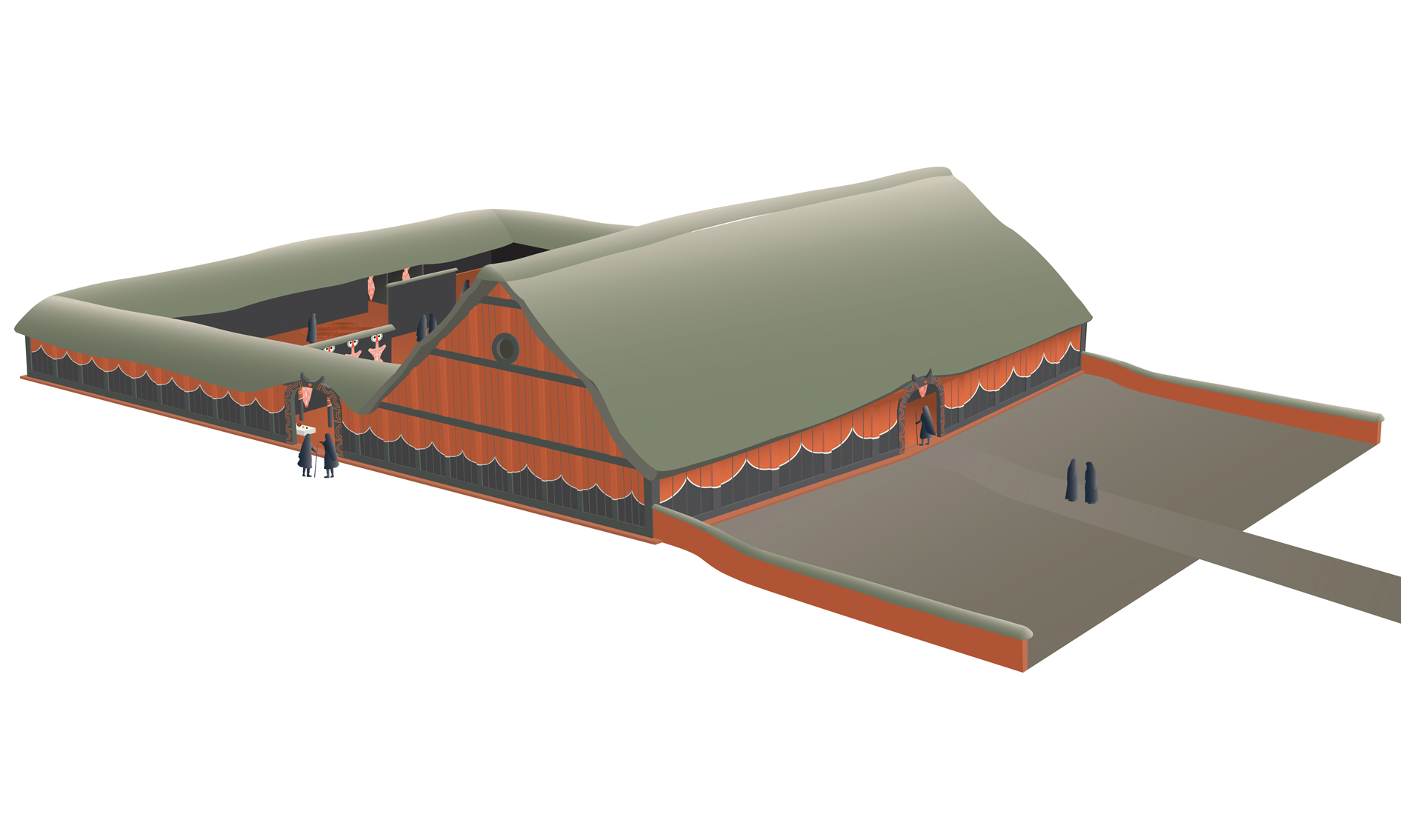
Nebelivka temple, reconstruction.

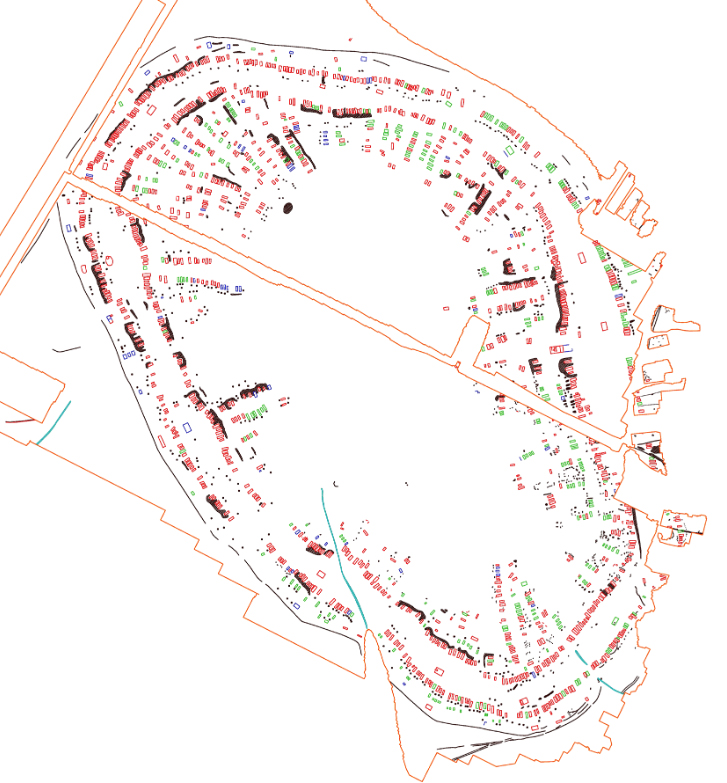
Nebelivka settlement ground plan

== Sources ==
- Müller, Johannes; Rassmann, Knut; Videiko, Mykhailo (2016). Trypillia Mega-Sites and European Prehistory: 4100-3400 BCE. Taylor & Francis. ISBN 9781317247920.
