= Kryzhopil Raion =

Former subdivision of Vinnytsia Oblast, Ukraine

Kryzhopil Raion Крижопільський район
- Raion
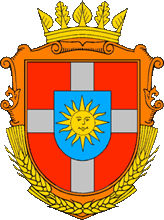
- Flag Coat of arms

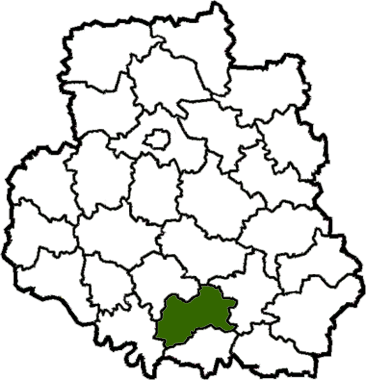
- Coordinates: 48°22′48.4″N 28°52′19.8″E
- Country: Ukraine
- Oblast: Vinnytsia Oblast
- Established: 1923
- Disestablished: 18 July 2020
- Admin. center: Kryzhopil
- Subdivisions: List: 0 — city councils; 1 — settlement councils; 19 — rural councils; Number of localities: 0 — cities; 1 — urban-type settlements; 36 — villages; — rural settlements

Government
  - Governor: Lidiya Semenyuk

Area
  - Total: 880 km^{2} (340 sq mi)

Population (2020)
  - Total: 32,134 ▼
  - Density: 37/km^{2} (95/sq mi)
- Time zone: UTC+02:00 (EET)
  - Summer (DST): UTC+03:00 (EEST)
- Postal index: 24600—24643
- Area code: +380 4340
- Website: http://rda.krz.gov.ua

Kryzhopil Raion (Ukrainian: Крижопільський район) was one of raions of Vinnytsia Oblast, located in southwestern Ukraine. The administrative center of the raion was the urban-type settlement of Kryzhopil. The raion was abolished and its territory was merged into Tulchyn Raion on 18 July 2020 as part of the administrative reform of Ukraine, which reduced the number of raions of Vinnytsia Oblast to six. The last estimate of the raion population was 32,134 (2020 est.).
