= Golubovka, Khomutovsky District, Kursk Oblast =

Coordinates: 51°49′13″N 34°55′41″E

Golubovka (Russian: Голубовка) is a village in Khomutovsky District, Kursk Oblast.

The village is located 34.5 kilometres (21.4 mi) from the Russia–Ukraine border and 88 kilometres (55 mi) west of Kursk.

Historical population
Year	Pop.	±%
2002	71	—
2010	19	−73.2%
2015	11	−42.1%
