= Haivoron Raion =

Former subdivision of Kirovohrad Oblast, Ukraine

Haivoron Raion Гайворонський район
- Raion
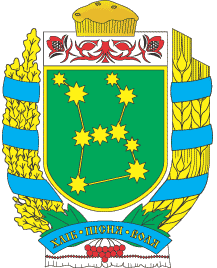
- Flag Coat of arms

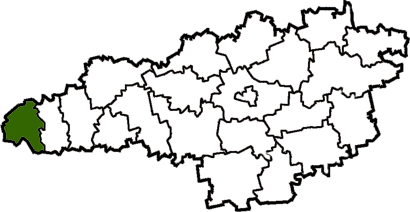
- Coordinates: 48°18′44″N 29°58′14″E
- Country: Ukraine
- Oblast: Kirovohrad Oblast
- Established: 1935
- Disestablished: 18 July 2020
- Admin. center: Haivoron
- Subdivisions: List: 1 — city councils; 2 — settlement councils; 16 — rural councils; Number of localities: 1 — cities; 2 — urban-type settlements; 26 — villages; — rural settlements

Government
  - Governor: Sergiy Kulynych

Area
  - Total: 700 km^{2} (270 sq mi)

Population (2020)
  - Total: 36,171 ▼
  - Density: 52/km^{2} (130/sq mi)
- Time zone: UTC+02:00 (EET)
  - Summer (DST): UTC+03:00 (EEST)
- Postal index: 26300—26336
- Area code: +380 5254
- Website: http://gayvoron.kr-admin.gov.ua

Haivoron Raion was a raion (district) of Kirovohrad Oblast in central Ukraine. The administrative center of the raion was the town of Haivoron. The raion was abolished on 18 July 2020 as part of the administrative reform of Ukraine, which reduced the number of raions of Kirovohrad Oblast to four. The area of Haivoron Raion was merged into Holovanivsk Raion. The last estimate of the raion population was 36,171 (2020 est.).

At the time of disestablishment, the raion consisted of two hromadas:

- Haivoron urban hromada with the administration in Haivoron;
- Zavallia settlement hromada with the administration in the urban-type settlement of Zavallia.
