= Solonytsivka =

Rural locality in Kharkiv Oblast, Ukraine

Solonytsivka Солоницівка
- Rural settlement
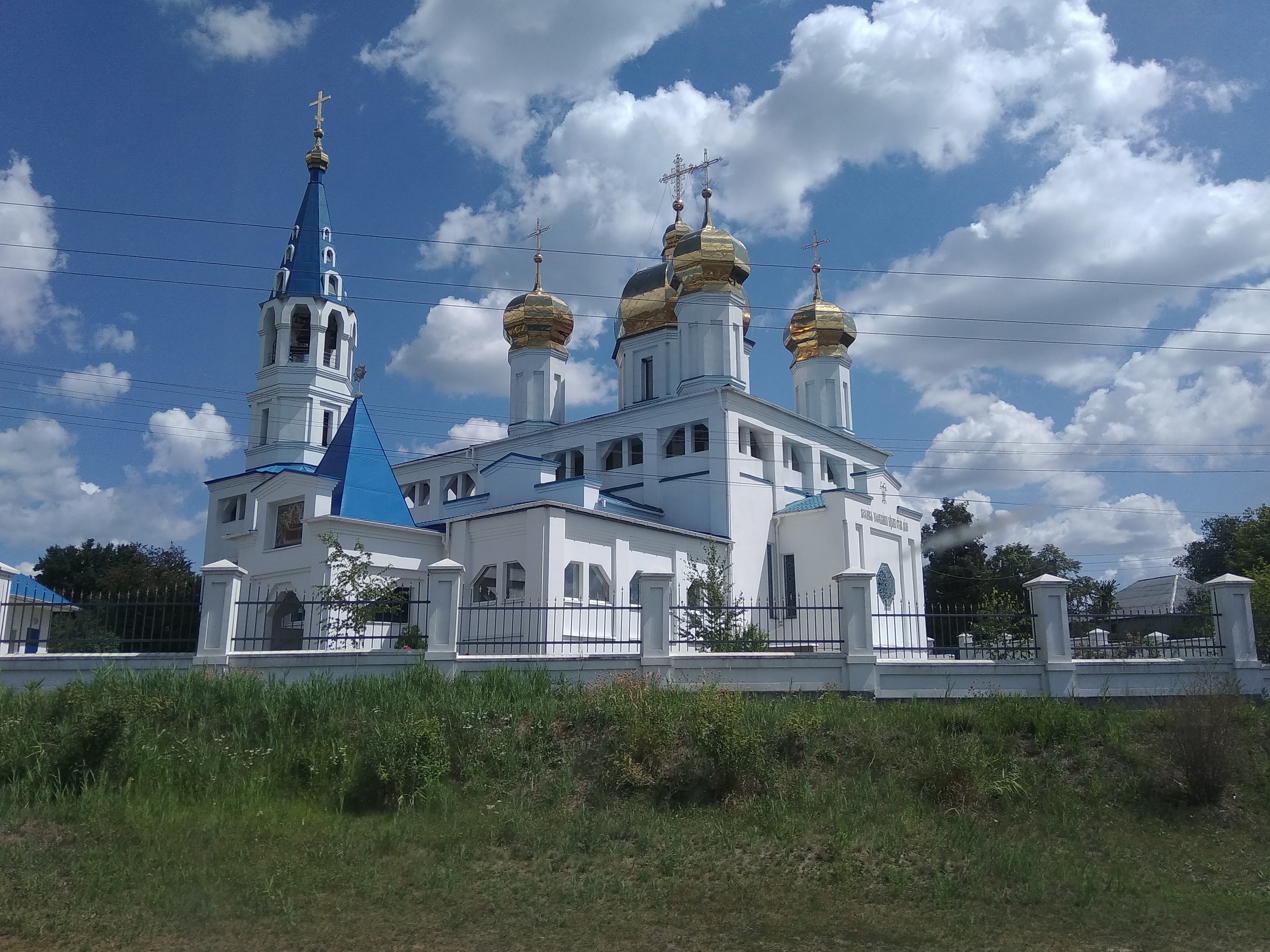
- Church of the Dormition

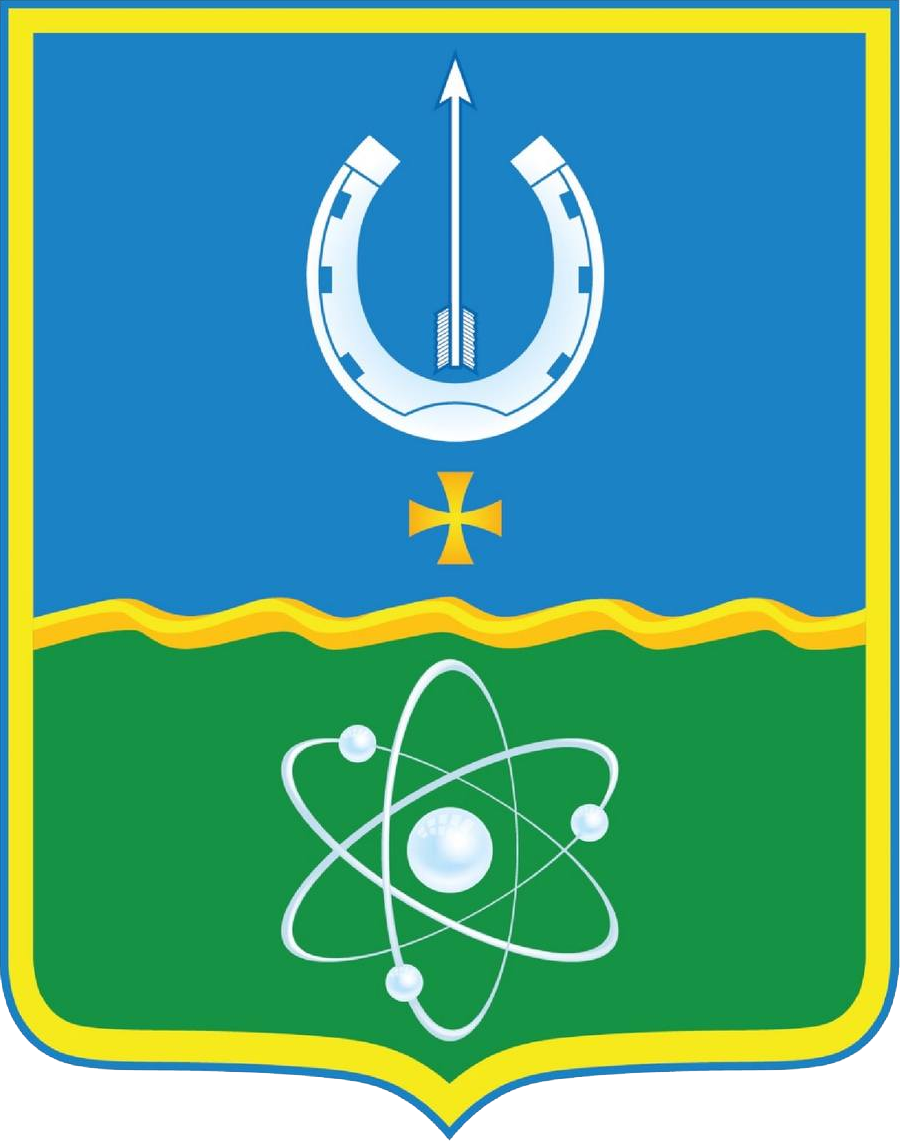
- Flag Coat of arms

- Location in Kharkiv Oblast Location in Ukraine
- Coordinates: 49°59′13″N 36°03′43″E
- Country: Ukraine
- Oblast: Kharkiv Oblast
- Raion: Kharkiv Raion
- Hromada: Solonytsivka settlement hromada

Population (2022)
  - Total: 13,254
- Time zone: UTC+2 (EET)
  - Summer (DST): UTC+3 (EEST)

Solonytsivka (Ukrainian: Солоницівка, Russian: Солоницевка) is a rural settlement in Kharkiv Raion of Kharkiv Oblast in Ukraine. It is located on the banks of the Udy, in the drainage basin of the Don. Solonytsivka hosts the administration of Solonytsivka settlement hromada, one of the hromadas of Ukraine. Population: 13,254 (2022 estimate).

== History ==
Until 18 July 2020, Solonytsivka belonged to Derhachi Raion. The raion was abolished in July 2020 as part of the administrative reform of Ukraine, which reduced the number of raions of Kharkiv Oblast to seven. The area of Derhachi Raion was merged into Kharkiv Raion.

Until 26 January 2024, Solonytsivka was designated urban-type settlement. On this day, a new law entered into force which abolished this status, and Solonytsivka became a rural settlement.

== Economy ==
=== Transportation ===
Zarichanka railway station is located in the settlement. It is on the railway line connecting Kharkiv and Zolochiv which continues across the Russian border to Gotnya.

Solonytsivka has road access to Kharkiv.
