= Holubivka, Dnipropetrovsk Oblast =

Holubivka Голубівка
- Village
- Location within Dnipropetrovsk Oblast Location within Ukraine
- Coordinates: 48°53′10″N 35°19′42″E
- Country: Ukraine
- Oblast: Dnipropetrovsk Oblast
- Raion: Novomoskovsk Raion

Population
  - Total: 3,836
- Time zone: UTC+2 (EET)
  - Summer (DST): UTC+3 (EEST)
- Postal Code: 51230

Holubivka (Ukrainian: Голубівка) is a village in central Ukraine, and is located in Novomoskovsk Raion of Dnipropetrovsk Oblast.

== Languages ==
Ukrainian: 87.23%
Russian: 11.81%
Others: 0.5%

== History ==
There were artifacts from the Kumans during the 11th and 12th century found in the village area. During the 16th and 17th centuries, this area was mainly inhabited by Zaporizhzhian Cossacks, after which it became part of the Yekaterinoslav Governorate within the Russian Empire. The village was also under Nazi German occupation during World War II.
