= Golubovka, Fatezhsky District, Kursk Oblast =

Rural locality in Kursk Oblast, Russia

Golubovka Голубовка
- Village
- Interactive map of Golubovka
- Location of Golubovka Golubovka (Kursk Oblast)
- Coordinates: 52°04′52″N 35°49′42″E
- Country: Russia
- Federal subject: Kursk Oblast
- Administrative district: Fatezhsky District
- SelsovietSelsoviet: Rusanovsky

Population (2010 Census)
  - Total: 56
  - Estimate (2010): 56 (0%)

Municipal status
  - Municipal district: Fatezhsky Municipal District
  - Rural settlement: Rusanovsky Selsoviet Rural Settlement
- Time zone: UTC+3 (MSK)
- Postal code: 307119
- Dialing code: +7 47144
- OKTMO ID: 38644464111
- Website: морусановский.рф

Golubovka (Russian: Голубовка) is a rural locality (Russian: деревня, lit. 'village') in Rusanovsky Selsoviet Rural Settlement, Fatezhsky District, Kursk Oblast, Russia. The population was 56 (2010 census); 80 (2002 census);

== Geography ==
The village is located on the Usozha River (a left tributary of the Svapa in the basin of the Seym), 101 km from the Russia–Ukraine border, 46 km north-west of Kursk, 1.5 km west of the district center – the town Fatezh, and 1 km from the selsoviet center – Basovka.

Climate

Golubovka has a warm-summer humid continental climate (Dfb in the Köppen climate classification).

== Transport ==
Golubovka is located 0.5 km from the federal route M-2 Crimea Highway as part of the European route E105, 1.5 km from the road of regional importance 38K-038 (Fatezh – Dmitriyev), 1 km from the road of intermunicipal significance 38H-255 (M2 "Crimea Highway" – Chibisovka), 32.5 km from the nearest railway halt 29 km (railway line Arbuzovo – Luzhki-Orlovskiye).

The rural locality is situated 48 km from Kursk Vostochny Airport, 166 km from Belgorod International Airport and 235 km from Voronezh Peter the Great Airport.
