= Novoarkhanhelsk =

Rural locality in Kirovohrad Oblast, Ukraine

Novoarkhanhelsk Новоархангельск
- Rural settlement
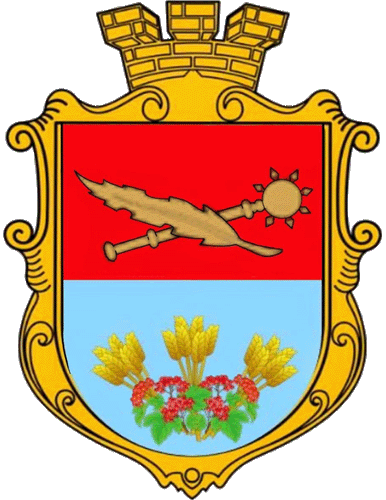
- Coat of arms

- Location within Ukraine Kirovohrad Oblast Location within Ukraine
- Coordinates: 48.6589°N 30.8186°E
- Country: Ukraine
- Oblast: Kirovohrad Oblast
- Raion: Holovanivsk Raion
- Hromada: Novoarkhanhelsk settlement hromada

Population
  - Estimate (2022): 5,882

Novoarkhanhelsk (Ukrainian: Новоархангельск), formerly known as Arkhanhelohorod (Ukrainian: Архангелогород), is a rural settlement in Holovanivsk Raion, Kirovohrad Oblast, Ukraine. It hosts the administration of Novoarkhanhelsk settlement hromada, one of the hromadas of Ukraine. As of 2022, its population was 5,882 (2022 estimate).

== Location & demographics ==
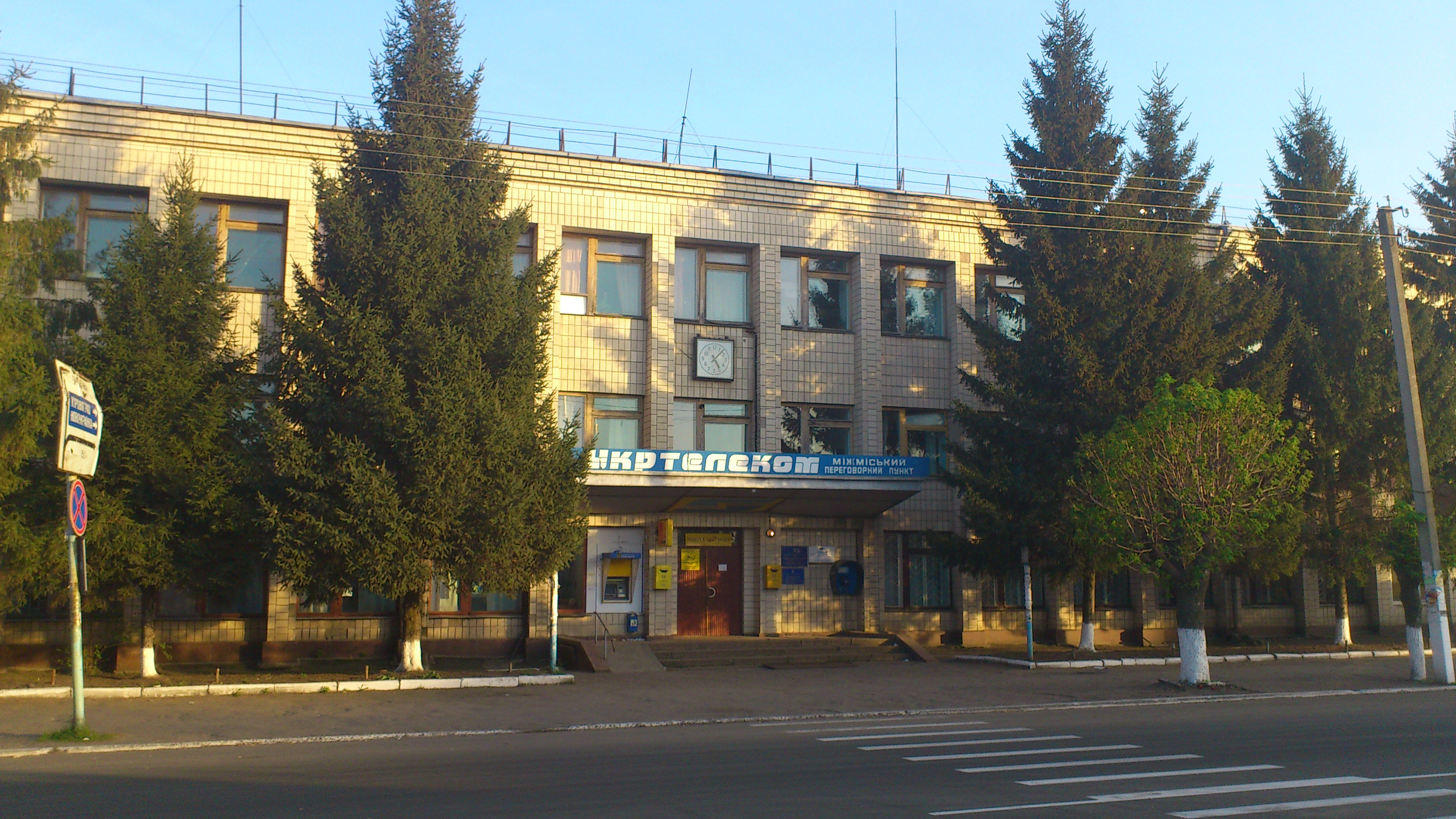
Novoarkhanhelsk

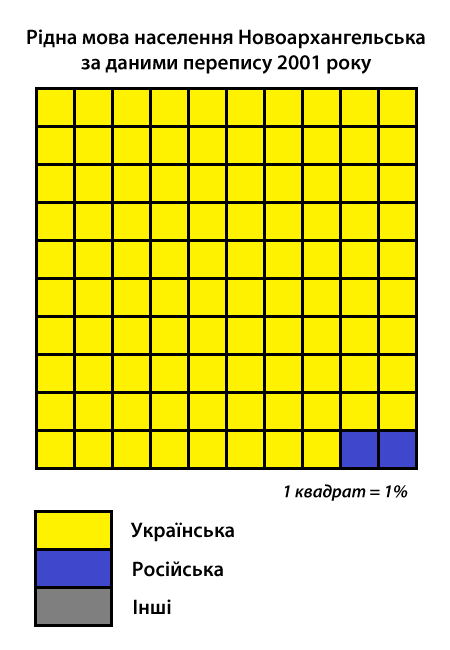
First language of the population of Novoarhanhelsk according to the 2001 Ukrainian census

Novoarkhanhelsk is located on the left bank of the Syniukha river, 120 km from the oblast capital of Kropyvnytskyi and 40 km from Talne (in Cherkassy Oblast). It is connected to Highway M12 (part of European route E50).

According to the 2001 Ukrainian census, 98% of the inhabitants spoke Ukrainian as a first language and 2% Russian.

== History ==
Founded in 1742 as Arkhanhelsk townlet near the Polish border, it became part of New Serbia in 1752 and was renamed Novoarkhanhelsk in 1764. In the 18th–19th centuries it was a local military and trade center, later serving as the seat of a hussar regiment and a volost administrative center in Kherson Governorate.

=== Archaeological finds ===
A prehistoric camp dating to the Upper Palaeolithic (40,000–13,000 Before Present) was discovered near Novoarkhanhelsk. Traces of a historic settlement dating to the 14th–15th century have also been found, including a large amount of iron tools and fragments related to blacksmithing.

=== Russian Empire ===
The Treaty of the Pruth (1711) defined the border between Zaporizhia and the Polish–Lithuanian Commonwealth as following the rivers Synyukha, Velyka Vys and Tyasmyn. The area now occupied by Novoarkhanhelsk was therefore situated on the southwestern frontier of the Tsardom of Russia.

Following the Austro-Russian–Turkish War (1735–39), the Russian government began to restore settlements destroyed by Tatar raids along the Polish border. The Governor of Kyiv ordered Colonel Kapnist of the Myrhorod Regiment to fortify the left bank of the Synyukha, opposite the Polish town of Torhovytsia, against Polish raids. The regiment constructed a pentagonal fortification with earthen ramparts inside a bend of the river, adding bastions to each corner. The new settlement, named Arkhanhelohorod (Ukrainian: Архангелогород, lit. "Archangel Town"), was initially garrisoned by cossacks and runaway peasants. In 1742, Kapnist, with the consent of Stanisław Potocki, the count of Torhovytsia, dispatched a cossack known as David of Zvenigorod to Podolia to bring back twenty Ukrainian families to settle the town.

In the 18th century, the Ukrainian anti-feudal movement found support in the region. In a complaint received by the Governor of Kyiv in 1747, a Polish nobleman accused an officer at Arkhanhelohorod by the name of J. Chechel of harbouring haidamaka ("thieves and brigands"). In 1748, another complained that residents of Arkhanhelohorod were amongst those who attacked the house of a szlachta near Vinnytsia.

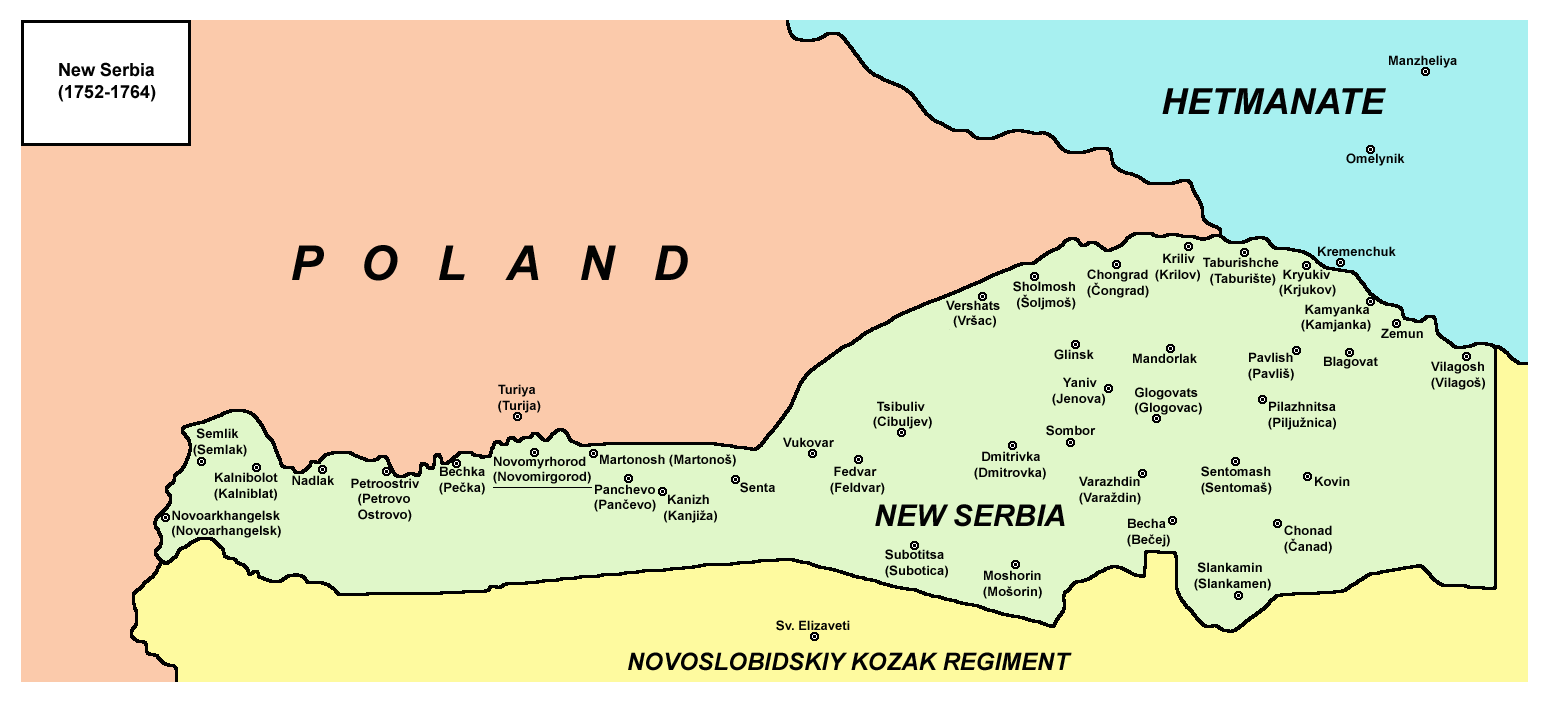
Novoarkhanhelsk as part of New Serbia (1752–1764)

In 1752, Arkhanhelohorod became part of New Serbia, when the Russian authorities invited Serbians from the Austro-Hungarian Empire to settle the frontier region. The garrison alternated between the 7th Company of the New Serbian Hussar regiment (1752–1754 and 1759–1761) and the Novoslobodskaya Cossack Regiment (1754–1759, 1761–1764).

In March 1764, it became the headquarters of seven companies of the newly formed Black Hussars. At this point the settlement, now known as Novoarkhanhelsk, was home to civilians engaged in farming, beekeeping, fishing, trading and craftsmanship, in addition to the military garrison. Its inhabitants included Old Believer and Jewish immigrants from Poland and Moldova.

In 1774, Johann Anton Güldenstädt undertook a documentary expedition to Ukraine on behalf of the Russian government. He described Novoarkhanhelsk as a commercial centre. From 1765 the town hosted three annual fairs. In 1784 it became part of the county (powiat) of Novomyrhorod, then from 1807 part of Olviopol county, Kherson Oblast.

By 1772, the fort had a church dedicated to the Archangel Michael.

As a military settlement, Novoarkhanhelsk was the headquarters of the 2nd Ukrainian Lancers (from 1821,) and later the 6th District of Novorossiya. In 1876 it was reported to contain 60 households.

By 1886, it was the centre of Novoarkhanhelsk parish, Yelisavetgrad county. It had a population of 2,512 and had 696 farm yards, an Orthodox church, a school, 19 shops and two taverns. Markets were held every second Sunday.

=== War of Independence, 1917–1920 ===
Novoarkhanhelsk was the scene of fighting during the Ukrainian War of Independence. In January 1918 the town came under the control of the Bolsheviks, but in early April it was occupied by Triple Alliance forces. In March 1919 it was recaptured by the Bolsheviks, and then in September by the White Army. Pogroms against the town's Jewish inhabitants took place. In Spring 1920 it was again recaptured by the Red Army.

=== USSR ===
From 1921 Novoarkhanhelsk has been the administrative centre of Novoarkhanhelsk Raion, and in 1957 it was given the status of urban-type settlement (town).

In 1927, a small power plant was built on the Synyukha. The town's first collective farm was established in 1929, and the first machine and tractor station was opened. In January 1932 the first issue of the district newspaper, Під прапором перемоги ("Under the flag of victory"), was published.

Novoarkhanhelsk played an important role in the Battle of Uman as part of the Soviet forces' supply line. German troops of the Wehrmacht 16th Motorized Infantry Division occupied the town on 30 July 1941. The fighting was fierce, and the town repeatedly passed between the German (16th Motorized Infantry Division and 1st SS Panzer Division Leibstandarte SS Adolf Hitler) and Soviet forces (44th Rifle Division and 216th Motorized Division) over the course of several days. It ended on 2 August, when the bridge connecting Novoarkhanhelsk to Torhovytsya was destroyed. After the battle, Novoarkhanhelsk was occupied as part of the Reichskommissariat Ukraine and a prisoner of war camp was set up there.

The occupation ended on 12 March 1944, when the 110th Guards Rifle Division of the 53rd Army, 2nd Ukrainian Front, under the command of Colonel D. P. Sobolev, recaptured Novoarkhanhelsk.

=== Post-independence ===
Until 18 July 2020, Novoarkhanhelsk was the administrative center of Novoarkhanhelsk Raion. The raion was abolished in July 2020 as part of the administrative reform of Ukraine, which reduced the number of raions of Kirovohrad Oblast to four. The area of Novoarkhanhelsk Raion was merged into Holovanivsk Raion.

Until 26 January 2024, Novoarkhanhelsk was designated urban-type settlement. On this day, a new law entered into force which abolished this status, and Novoarkhanhelsk became a rural settlement.

== Notable people ==
- Yevhen Malaniuk (1897–1968) – Ukrainian poet, literary critic, and soldier of the Ukrainian People's Army.
- Zavel Kwartin (1874–1952) – Prominent cantor, representative of traditional synagogue singing (ḥazzanut), and composer.
- Vasyl Kozachenko (1913–1995) – Soviet–Ukrainian writer.
- Maurice Podoloff (1890–1985) – American lawyer, basketball and ice hockey administrator.
- Vladimir Gelfand (1923–1983) – Soviet Red Army officer and author of wartime diaries (1941–1946).
- Andriy Hulyi-Hulenko – General-chornyzhy of the Ukrainian People's Army.
- Anatoliy Zahravenko – Ukrainian writer and poet.
- Serhiy Surzhenko (1985–2015) – Soldier of the Armed Forces of Ukraine, participant in the War in Donbas.
- Tamara Fedorova (1929–2011) – Ukrainian notary, listed in the Golden Book of the Notariat of Ukraine.
- Hennadiy Bizhan – Ukrainian military officer, colonel of the Armed Forces of Ukraine.

== See also ==
- Arkhangelsk
