= Kryzhopil =

Rural locality in Vinnytsia Oblast, Ukraine

Kryzhopil Крижопіль
- Rural settlement
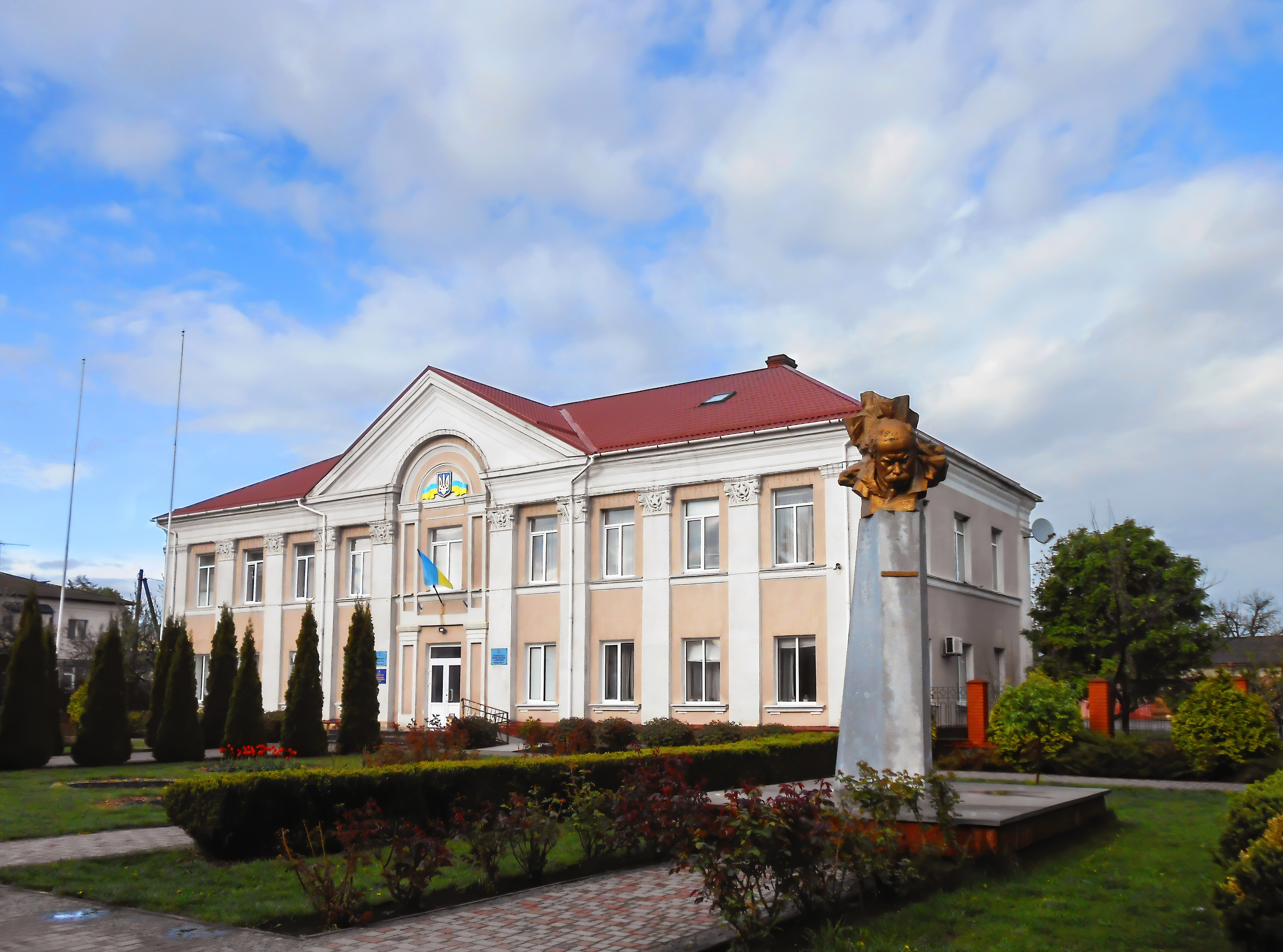
- Monument to Taras Shevchenko in Kryzhopil

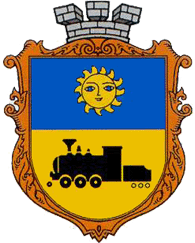
- Coat of arms

- Location within Vinnytsia Oblast Location within Ukraine
- Coordinates: 48°23′3″N 28°51′45″E
- Country: Ukraine
- Oblast: Vinnytsia Oblast
- Raion: Tulchyn Raion
- Hromada: Kryzhopil settlement hromada
- Founded: 1866

Population (2022)
  - Total: 8,479
- Time zone: UTC+2 (EET)
  - Summer (DST): UTC+3 (EEST)
- Postal code: 24600
- Area code: +380 4374

Kryzhopil (Ukrainian: Крижопіль; Russian: Крыжополь, romanized: Kryzhopol) is a rural settlement in Tulchyn Raion, Vinnytsia Oblast, Ukraine. Before the 2020 reform, the settlement was the administrative centre of the former Kryzhopil Raion. Population: 8,479 (2022 estimate).

== History ==
Kryzhopil was founded in 1866 during the construction of Kyiv-Odesa railroad and named after village Krzyżopol, located 17 km from the modern settlement. Railway station started to operate in August 1870. Since foundation to 1923 the settlement was a part of Olgopolsky Uyezd of Podolian Governorate.

During World War II, Kryzhopil was occupied by Romanian forces and became a part of Transnistria Governorate. The settlement was retaken by the Red Army on 17 March 1944.

Until 26 January 2024, Kryzhopil was designated urban-type settlement. On this day, a new law entered into force which abolished this status, and Kryzhopil became a rural settlement.

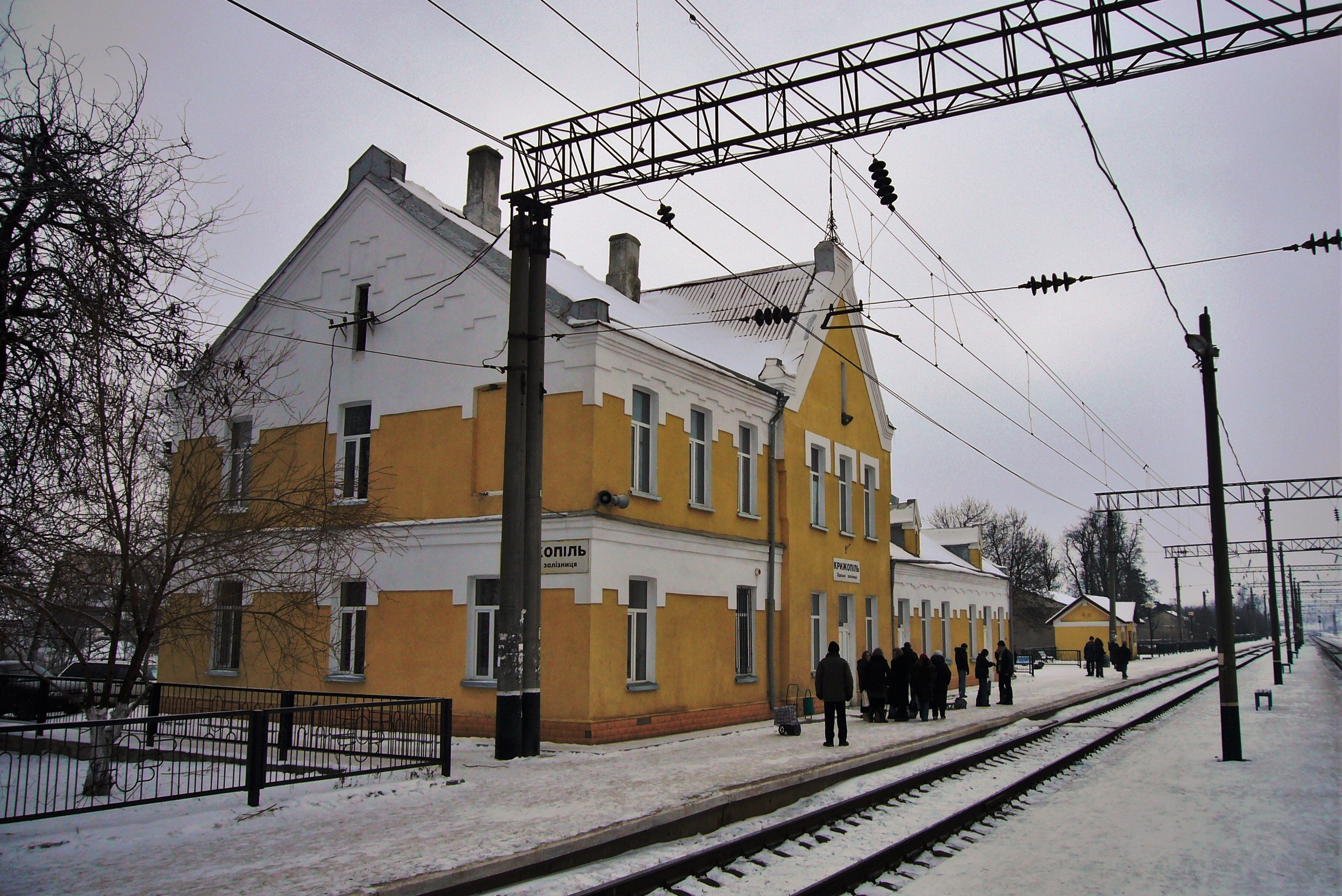
Railway station

== Notable people ==
Notable people that were born or lived in Kryzhopil include:

- Sidor Belarsky (1898–1975), Ukrainian-American singer
