= Novotroitske =

Novotroitske (Ukrainian: Новотроїцьке) is the name of several localities in Ukraine.

- Novotroitske, Donetsk Oblast, an urban-type settlement in Donetsk Oblast, Ukraine
- Novotroitske, Kherson Oblast, an urban-type settlement in Kherson Oblast, Ukraine
- Novotroitske, Orikhiv Raion, a village in Orikhiv Raion, Zaporizhia Oblast

== See also ==
- Novotroitskoye
