= Novoarkhanhelsk Raion =

Former subdivision of Kirovohrad Oblast, Ukraine

Novoarkhanhelsk Raion Новоархангельський район
- Raion
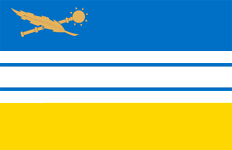
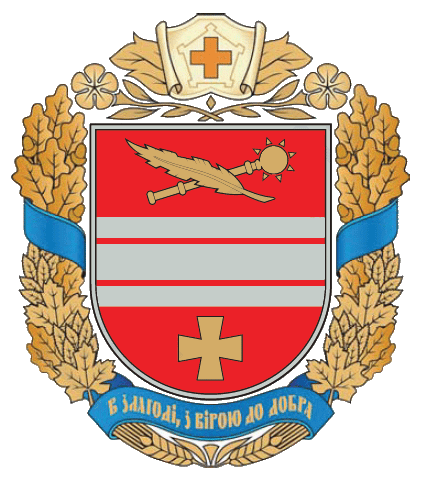
- Flag Coat of arms

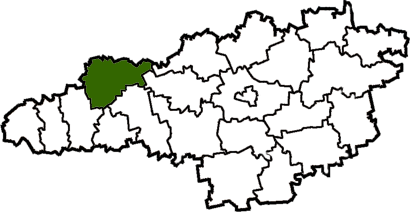
- Coordinates: 48°31′43″N 32°25′22″E
- Country: Ukraine
- Region: Kirovohrad Oblast
- Established: 1921
- Disestablished: 18 July 2020
- Admin. center: Novoarkhanhelsk
- Subdivisions: List: 0 — city councils; 1 — settlement councils; 21 — rural councils; Number of localities: 0 — cities; 1 — urban-type settlements; 51 — villages; — rural settlements

Government
  - Governor: Olga Balytska

Area
  - Total: 1,200 km^{2} (460 sq mi)

Population (2020)
  - Total: 23,524 ▼
  - Density: 20/km^{2} (51/sq mi)
- Time zone: UTC+02:00 (EET)
  - Summer (DST): UTC+03:00 (EEST)
- Postal index: 26100—26154
- Area code: +380 5255
- Website: http://novoarh.kr-admin.gov.ua

Novoarkhanhelsk Raion was a raion (district) of Kirovohrad Oblast in central Ukraine. The administrative center of the raion was the urban-type settlement of Novoarkhanhelsk. The raion was abolished on 18 July 2020 as part of the administrative reform of Ukraine, which reduced the number of raions of Kirovohrad Oblast to four. The area of Novoarkhanhelsk Raion was merged into Holovanivsk Raion. The last estimate of the raion population was 23,524 (2020 est.).

At the time of disestablishment, the raion consisted of three hromadas:

- Nadlak rural hromada with the administration in the selo of Nadlak;
- Novoarkhanhelsk settlement hromada with the administration in Novoarkhanhelsk;
- Pidvysoke rural hromada with the administration in the selo of Pidvysoke.
