= Holovanivsk Raion =

Subdivision of Kirovohrad Oblast, Ukraine

Holovanivsk Raion Голованівський район
- Raion
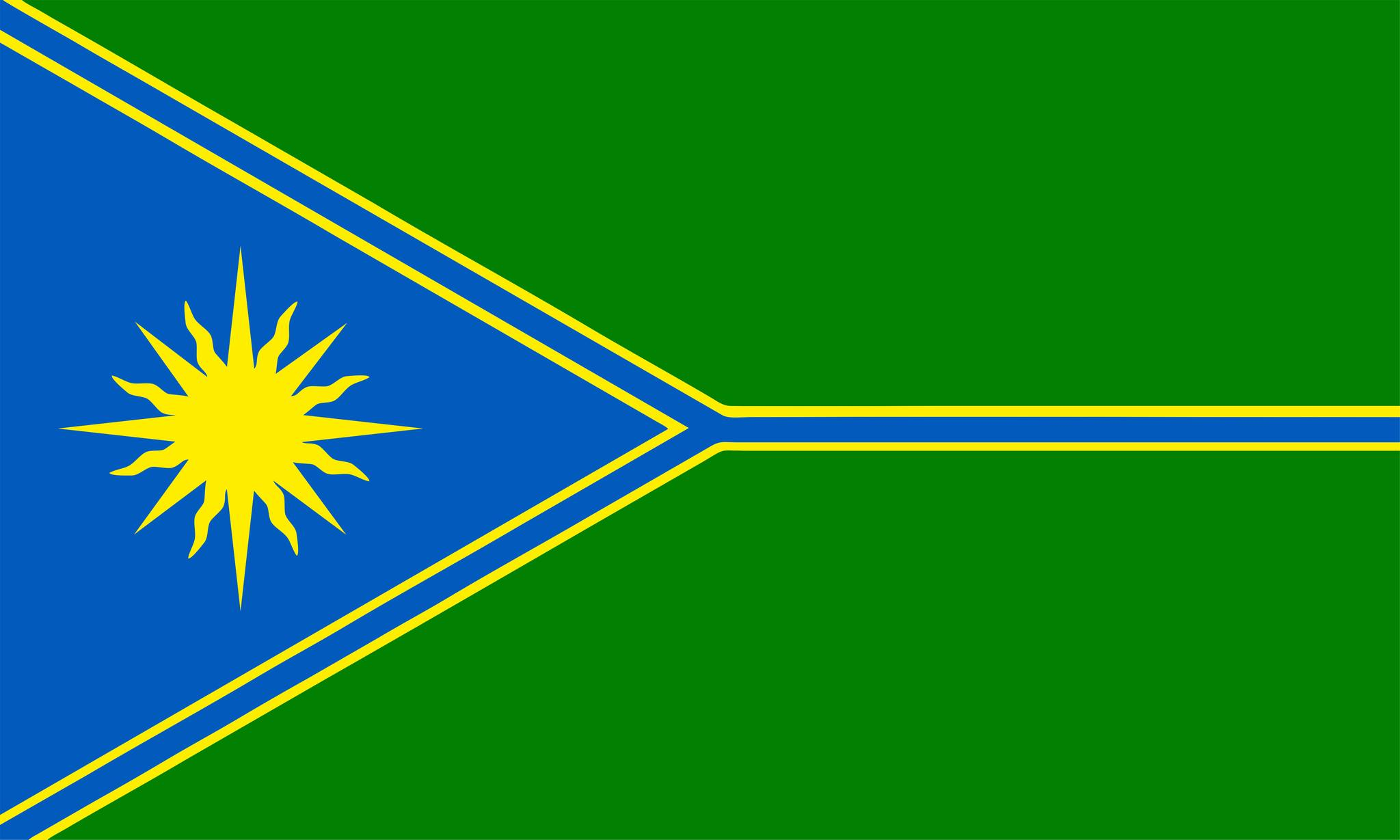
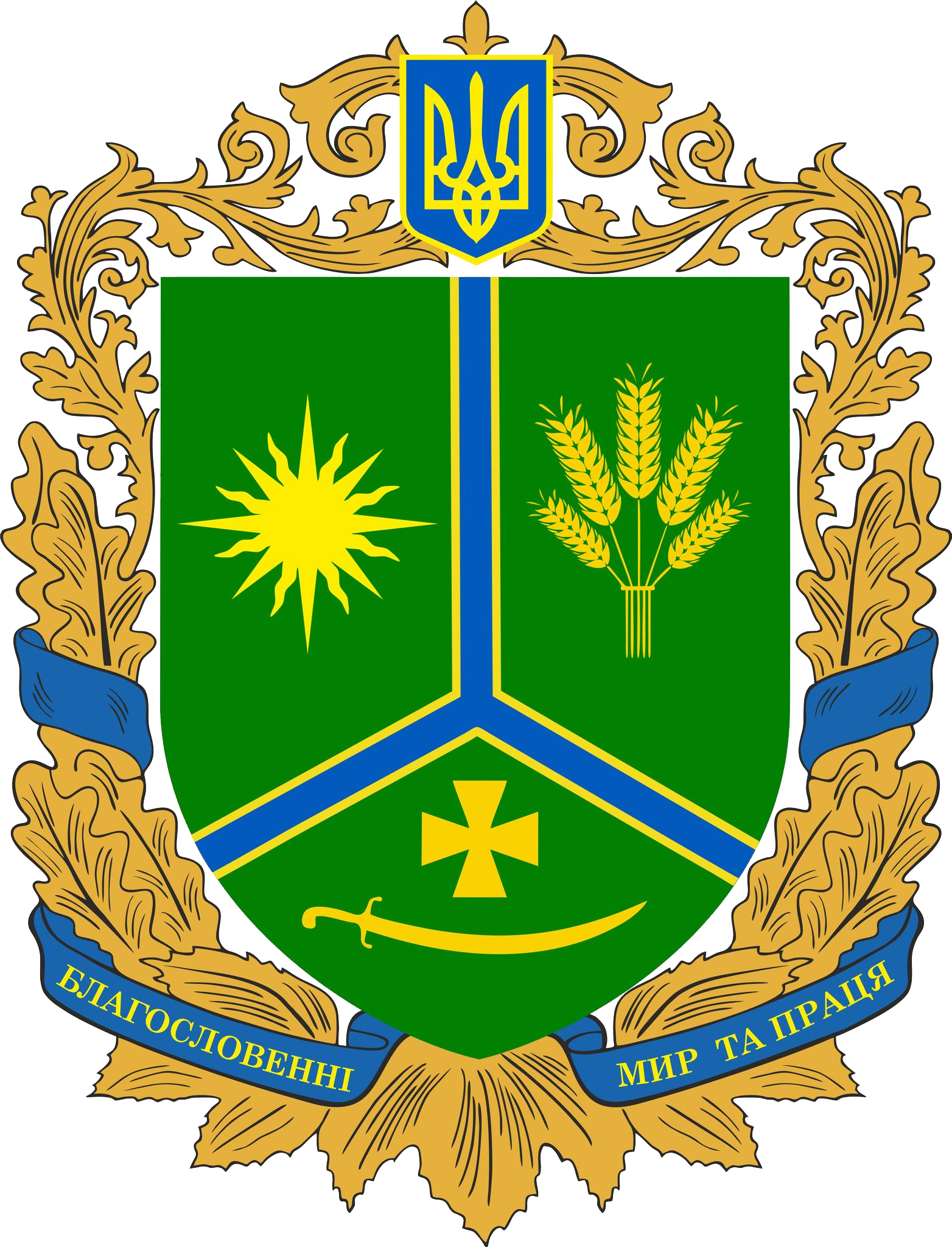
- Flag Coat of arms

- Coordinates: 48°22′10″N 30°30′59″E
- Country: Ukraine
- Oblast: Kirovohrad Oblast
- Established: 1923
- Admin. center: Holovanivsk
- Subdivisions: 10 hromadas

Government
  - Governor: Arkadiy Tkachuk

Area
  - Total: 4,244.3 km^{2} (1,638.7 sq mi)

Population (2022)
  - Total: 118,803
  - Density: 27.991/km^{2} (72.497/sq mi)
- Time zone: UTC+02:00 (EET)
  - Summer (DST): UTC+03:00 (EEST)
- Postal index: 26500—26555
- Area code: +380 5252
- Website: https://web.archive.org/web/20140223094237/http://golvrda.org.ua/

Holovanivsk Raion is a raion (district) of Kirovohrad Oblast in central Ukraine. The administrative center of the raion is the rural settlement of Holovanivsk. Its population is 118,803 (2022 estimate).

On 18 July 2020, as part of the administrative reform of Ukraine, the number of raions of Kirovohrad Oblast was reduced to four, and the area of Holovanivsk Raion was significantly expanded. Four abolished raions, Blahovishchenske, Haivoron, Novoarkhanhelsk, and Vilshanka Raions, were merged into Holovanivsk Raion. The January 2020 estimate of the raion population was 29,452 (2020 est.).

== Subdivisions ==
=== Current ===
After the reform in July 2020, the raion consisted of 10 hromadas:

- Blahovishchenske urban hromada with the administration in the city of Blahovishchenske, transferred from Blahovishchenske Raion;
- Haivoron urban hromada with the administration in the city of Haivoron, transferred from Haivoron Raion;
- Holovanivsk settlement hromada with the administration in rural settlement of Holovanivsk, retained from Holovanivsk Raion;
- Nadlak rural hromada with the administration in the selo of Nadlak, transferred from Novoarkhanhelsk Raion;
- Novoarkhanhelsk settlement hromada with the administration in the rural settlement of Novoarkhanhelsk, transferred from Novoarkhanhelsk Raion;
- Perehonivka rural hromada with the administration in the selo of Perehonivka, retained from Holovanivsk Raion;
- Pidvysoke rural hromada with the administration in the selo of Pidvysoke, transferred from Novoarkhanhelsk Raion;
- Pobuzke settlement hromada with the administration in the rural settlement of Pobuzke, retained from Holovanivsk Raion;
- Vilshanka settlement hromada with the administration in the rural settlement of Vilshanka, transferred from Vilshanka Raion;
- Zavallia settlement hromada with the administration in the rural settlement of Zavallia, transferred from Haivoron Raion.

=== Before 2020 ===
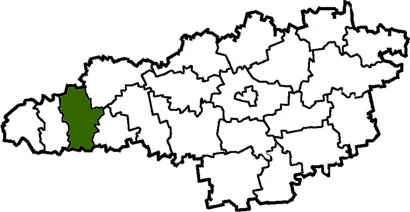
Holovanivsk Raion in Kirovohrad Oblast before 2020

Before the 2020 reform, the raion consisted of three hromadas:

- Holovanivsk settlement hromada with the administration in Holovanivsk;
- Perehonivka rural hromada with the administration in Perehonivka;
- Pobuzke settlement hromada with the administration in Pobuzke.
