= Haivoron =

City in Kirovohrad Oblast, Ukraine

Haivoron Гайворон
- City
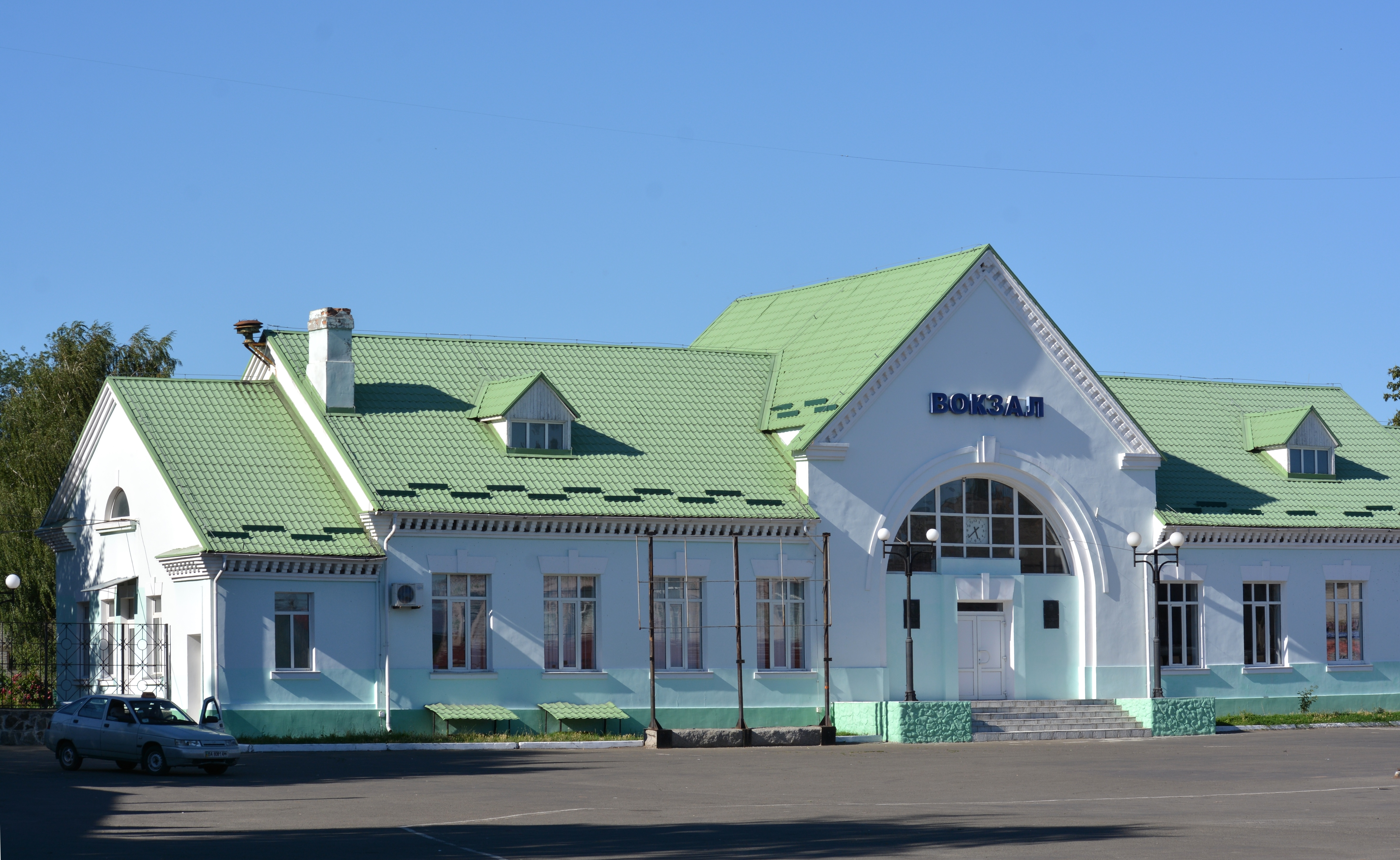
- Railway station

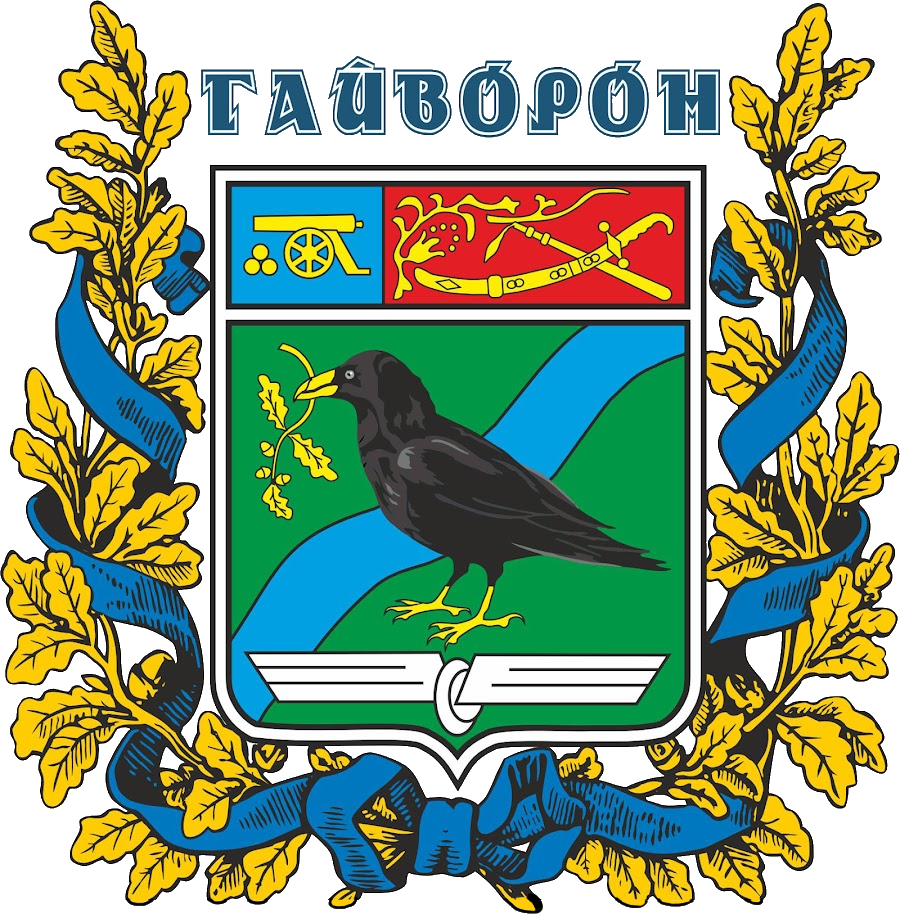
- Flag Coat of arms
- Interactive map of Haivoron
- Location of Haivoron Haivoron (Ukraine)
- Country: Ukraine
- Oblast: Kirovohrad Oblast
- Raion: Holovanivsk Raion
- Hromada: Haivoron urban hromada
- Founded: 1800

Population (2022)
  - Total: 14,010
  - Estimate (01.04.2025): ▼13,275

Haivoron (Ukrainian: Гайворон, IPA: [ˈɦɑjworon]) is a city in Holovanivsk Raion, Kirovohrad Oblast, Ukraine. It hosts the administration of the Haivoron urban hromada, one of the hromadas of Ukraine. Haivoron is situated along the Southern Bug.

== History ==
Haivoron is a former village from Gaysin uyezd in Podolian Governorate of the Russian Empire. From 1897 to 1898 a locomotive repair plant was built in Haivoron. During World War II, the settlement was occupied by Axis troops from July 29, 1941 to March 11, 1944. It was a town since 1949. In 1974, the technical school was transformed into a technical college. In 1989 a new school was built here.

Until 18 July 2020, Haivoron was the administrative center of Haivoron Raion. The raion was abolished in July 2020 as part of the administrative reform of Ukraine, which reduced the number of raions of Kirovohrad Oblast to four. The area of Haivoron Raion was merged into Holovanivsk Raion.

Population over time
Jan. 1989	2013	2022
16,520	15,214	14,010

== Geography ==
=== Climate ===
Climate data for Haivoron (1991–2020)
Month	Jan	Feb	Mar	Apr	May	Jun	Jul	Aug	Sep	Oct	Nov	Dec	Year
Mean daily maximum °C (°F)	0.2 (32.4)	2.1 (35.8)	8.3 (46.9)	16.5 (61.7)	22.5 (72.5)	25.9 (78.6)	28.0 (82.4)	27.8 (82.0)	21.8 (71.2)	14.1 (57.4)	7.1 (44.8)	1.7 (35.1)	14.7 (58.5)
Daily mean °C (°F)	−3.0 (26.6)	−1.6 (29.1)	3.2 (37.8)	10.2 (50.4)	15.9 (60.6)	19.6 (67.3)	21.5 (70.7)	20.7 (69.3)	15.2 (59.4)	9.0 (48.2)	3.5 (38.3)	−1.3 (29.7)	9.4 (48.9)
Mean daily minimum °C (°F)	−5.7 (21.7)	−4.8 (23.4)	−1.0 (30.2)	4.4 (39.9)	9.6 (49.3)	13.6 (56.5)	15.4 (59.7)	14.2 (57.6)	9.5 (49.1)	4.5 (40.1)	0.6 (33.1)	−3.9 (25.0)	4.7 (40.5)
Average precipitation mm (inches)	32 (1.3)	29 (1.1)	33 (1.3)	36 (1.4)	52 (2.0)	81 (3.2)	75 (3.0)	49 (1.9)	53 (2.1)	39 (1.5)	40 (1.6)	36 (1.4)	555 (21.9)
Average precipitation days (≥ 1.0 mm)	6.6	5.3	6.6	6.3	7.8	7.9	7.3	5.3	6.2	5.3	5.9	6.4	76.9
Average relative humidity (%)	83.3	80.2	73.9	64.9	66.6	69.1	69.4	68.0	73.5	79.3	84.3	85.3	74.8
Source: NOAA
