= Holovanivsk =

Rural locality in Kirovohrad Oblast, Ukraine

Holovanivsk Голованівськ
- Rural settlement
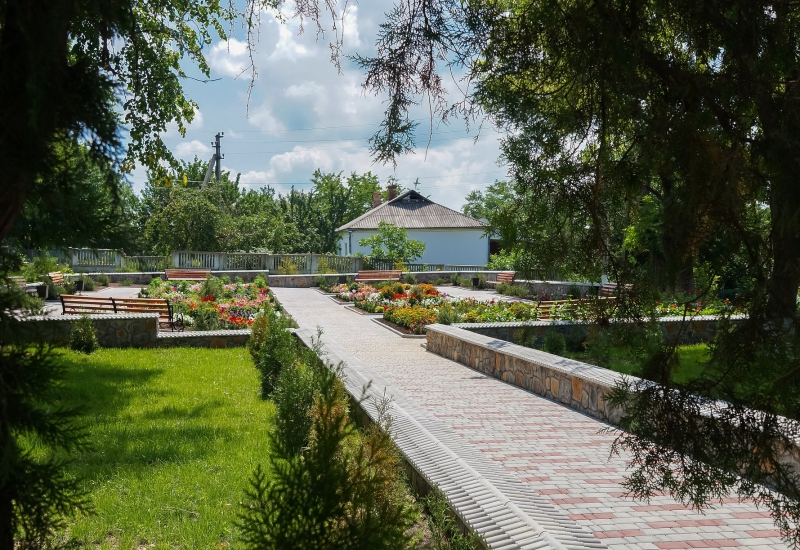
- Park

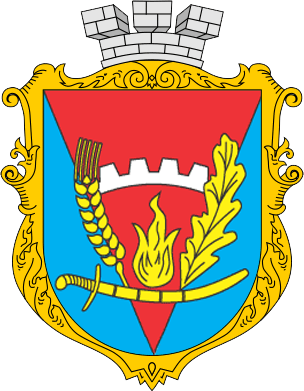
- Coat of arms

- Location within Ukraine Kirovohrad Oblast Location within Ukraine
- Coordinates: 48°22′48″N 30°26′50″E
- Country: Ukraine
- Oblast: Kirovohrad Oblast
- Raion: Holovanivsk Raion
- Hromada: Holovanivsk settlement hromada
- Founded: 1757

Population (2022)
  - Total: 5,646
- Postal code: 26500

Holovanivsk (Ukrainian: Голованівськ, IPA: [ɦoloˈwɑn⁽ʲ⁾iu̯sʲk]) is a rural settlement and the administrative center of Holovanivsk Raion in the west of Kirovohrad Oblast, Ukraine. It hosts the administration of Holovanivsk settlement hromada, one of the hromadas of Ukraine. Population: 5,646 (2022 estimate).

== History ==
It was a village in the Baltsky Uyezd of the Podolian Governorate of the Russian Empire.

A local newspaper is published here since March 1932.

The village was a shtetl home to thousands of Jews through the 1930s. Often targeted by pogroms, Jewish residents organized a self-defense militia after an incident on December 18, 1917, in which the Jewish stands of the town marketplace were looted and nine pogromists and civilians were killed in the ethnic violence that followed.

The Jewish self-defense unit was defeated by White Army forces commanded by Yakov Slashchov on August 4, 1919, when Slashchov’s forces killed 200 Jews in Holovanivs'k as retaliation for the militia’s armed opposition. In February 1920, retreating White Army forces under Anton Denikin killed 50 Jews at Holovanivsk.

During the Ukrainian–Soviet War, on January 6–15, 1920, the Black Zaporozhian Horse Regiment of the Ukrainian People's Republic operated here

During World War II the village was under Nazi German occupation, and its Jewish population was largely exterminated in two major operations in late September 1941 and February 1942. The town was liberated the Red Army on March 17, 1944. A local public garden on the grounds of the Museum of the History of Holovanivsk District contains a mass grave of Jewish remains with a memorial inscribed: "The shooting place of residents of Holovanivsk village."

In January 1989 the population was 7066 people.

In January 2013 the population was 6133 people.

Until 26 January 2024, Holovanivsk was designated urban-type settlement. On this day, a new law entered into force which abolished this status, and Holovanivsk became a rural settlement.
