= Administrative divisions of Kirovohrad Oblast =

Kirovohrad Oblast is subdivided into districts (raions) which are subdivided into territorial communities (hromadas).

== Current ==
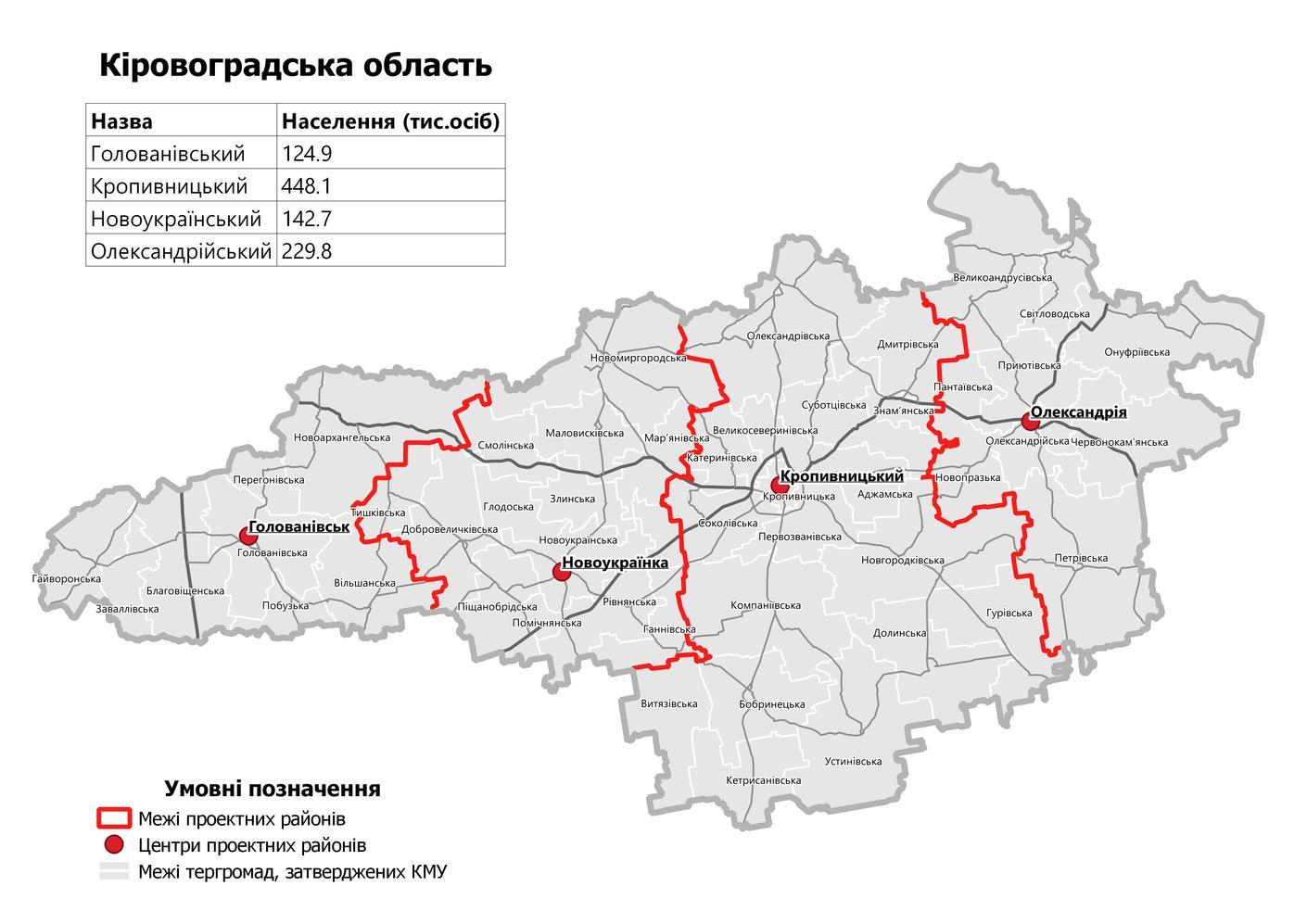
Raions of Kirovohrad Oblast as of August 2020.

On 18 July 2020, the number of districts was reduced to four. These are:

1. Holovanivsk (Голованівський район), the center is in the rural settlement of Holovanivsk;
2. Kropyvnytskyi (Кропивницький район), the center is in the city of Kropyvnytskyi;
3. Novoukrainka (Новоукраїнський район), the center is in the town of Novoukrainka;
4. Oleksandriia (Олександрійський район), the center is in the town of Oleksandriia.

**Kirovohrad Oblast**
As of January 1, 2022
Number of districts (райони)	4
Number of hromadas (громади)	49

=== Communities (hromadas) per District (raion) ===
In bold are communities (hromadas) with cities

Holovanivsk Raion

- **Blahovishchenske**
- **Haivoron**
- Holovanivsk
- Nadlak
- Novoarkhanhelsk
- Perehonivka
- Pidvysoke
- Pobuzke
- Vilshanka
- Zavallia

Kropyvnytskyi Raion

- Adzhamka
- **Bobrynets**
- Dmytrivka
- **Dolynska**
- Hurivka
- Kamyanets
- Katerynivka
- Ketrysanivka
- Kompaniivka
- **Kropyvnytskyi**
- Oleksandrivka
- Pervozvanivka
- Sokolivske
- Subotsi
- Ustynivka
- Velyka Severynka
- **Znamyanka**

Novoukrayinka Raion

- Dobrovelychkivka
- Hannivka
- Hlodosy
- **Mala Vyska**
- **Novomyrhorod**
- **Novoukrayinka**
- Pishchanyi Brid
- **Pomichna**
- Rivne
- Smoline
- Tyshkivka
- Velyka Vyska
- Zlynka

Oleksandriia Raion

- Nova Praha
- **Oleksandriia**
- Onufriivka
- Pantayivka
- Petrove
- Popelnaste
- Pryiutivka
- **Svitlovodsk**
- Velyka Andrusivka

== Administrative divisions until 2020 ==
Raions of Kirovohrad Oblast as of June 2020. The city of Kropyvnytskyi is shown in dark blue.

Before July 2020, Kirovohrad Oblast was subdivided into 25 regions: 21 districts (raions) and 4 city municipalities (mis'krada or misto), officially known as territories governed by city councils.

Name	Ukrainian Name	Area (km^{2})	Population estimate 2015	Admin.center	Urban Population Only
Kropyvnytskyi Municipality	Кропивницький (місто)	103	239,837	Kropyvnytskyi (city)	231,228
Oleksandriia	Олександрія (місто)	55	91,881	Oleksandriia (city)	82,269
Svitlovodsk	Світловодськ (місто)	45	53,449	Svitlovodsk (city)	45,746
Znamianka	Знам'янка (місто)	15	28,507	Znamianka (city)	23,245
Bobrynets'kyi raion	Бобринецький район	1,496	25,993	Bobrynets	10,998
Dobrovelychkivs'kyi raion	Добровеличківський район	1,297	33,925	Dobrovelychkivka	14,726
Dolyns'kyi raion	Долинський район	1,200	34,535	Dolynska	20,713
Haivorons'kyi raion	Гайворонський район	700	38,335	Haivoron	21,556
Holovanivs'kyi raion	Голованівський район	992	31,084	Holovanivsk	11,996
Kropyvnytskyi Raion	Кропивницький район	1,600	37,123	Kropyvnytskyi (city)	N/A *
Kompaniyivs'kyi raion	Компаніївський район	967	15,413	Kompaniivka	4,537
Malovyskivs'kyi raion	Маловисківський район	1,111	43,678	Mala Vyska	20,660
Novhorodkivs'kyi raion	Новгородківський район	997	15,567	Novhorodka	5,775
Novoarkhanhel's'kyi raion	Новоархангельський район	1,200	24,743	Novoarkhanhelsk	6,286
Novomyrhorods'kyi raion	Новомиргородський район	1,032	28,554	Novomyrhorod	13,894
Novoukrains'kyi raion	Новоукраїнський район	1,668	42,055	Novoukrainka	17,176
Oleksandrivs'kyi raion	Олександрівський район	1,159	27,558	Oleksandrivka	11,279
Oleksandriys'kyi raion	Олександрійський район	1,854	35,765	Oleksandriia (city)	N/A *
Onufriyivs'kyi raion	Онуфріївський район	889	18,445	Onufriivka	8,695
Petrivs'kyi raion	Петрівський район	1,195	24,329	Petrove	8,173
Svitlovods'kyi raion	Світловодський район	1,219	12,420	Svitlovodsk (city)	N/A *
Blahovishchenske Raion	Ульяновський район	701	22,742	Blahovishchenske	6,080
Ustynivs'kyi raion	Устинівський район	942	13,106	Ustynivka	3,467
Vilshans'kyi raion	Вільшанський район	645	12,650	Vilshanka	4,689
Znamyans'kyi raion	Знам'янський район	1,334	23,030	Znamianka (city)	N/A *
Total Oblast	Кіровоградська Область	24,588	974,724		612,237

Note: Asterisks (*) Though the administrative center of the rayon was housed in the city/town that it was named after, cities do not answer to the rayon authorities only towns do; instead they were directly subordinated to the oblast government and therefore were not counted as part of rayon statistics.

- Cities under the oblast's jurisdiction:
  - Kropyvnytskyi Municipality
    - Cities and towns under the city's jurisdiction:
      - Kropyvnytskyi (Кропивницьки), formerly Kirovohrad, the administrative center of the oblast
    - Urban-type settlements under the city's jurisdiction:
      - Nove (Нове)
  - Oleksandriia Municipality
    - Cities and towns under the city's jurisdiction:
      - Oleksandriia (Олександрія)
    - Urban-type settlements under the city's jurisdiction:
      - Oleksandriiske (Олександрійське), formerly Dymytrove
      - Pantaivka (Пантаївка)
  - Svitlovodsk Municipality
    - Cities and towns under the city's jurisdiction:
      - Svitlovodsk (Світловодськ)
    - Urban-type settlements under the city's jurisdiction:
      - Vlasivka (Власівка)
  - Znamianka Municipality
    - Cities and towns under the city's jurisdiction:
      - Znamianka (Знам'янка)
    - Urban-type settlements under the city's jurisdiction:
      - Znamianka Druha (Знам'янка Друга)
- Districts (raions):
  - Blahovishchenske Raion (Благовіщенський район), formerly Ulianovka Raion
    - Cities and towns under the district's jurisdiction:
      - Blahovishchenske (Благовіщенське), formerly Ulianovka
  - Bobrynets (Бобринецький район)
    - Cities and towns under the district's jurisdiction:
      - Bobrynets (Бобринець)
  - Dobrovelychkivka (Добровеличківський район)
    - Cities and towns under the district's jurisdiction:
      - Pomichna (Помічна)
    - Urban-type settlements under the district's jurisdiction:
      - Dobrovelychkivka (Добровеличківка)
  - Dolynska (Долинський район)
    - Cities and towns under the district's jurisdiction:
      - Dolynska (Долинська)
    - Urban-type settlements under the district's jurisdiction:
      - Molodizhne (Молодіжне)
  - Haivoron (Гайворонський район)
    - Cities and towns under the district's jurisdiction:
      - Haivoron (Гайворон)
    - Urban-type settlements under the district's jurisdiction:
      - Salkove (Салькове)
      - Zavallia (Завалля)
  - Holovanivsk (Голованівський район)
    - Urban-type settlements under the district's jurisdiction:
      - Holovanivsk (Голованівськ)
      - Pobuzke (Побузьке)
  - Kompaniivka (Компаніївський район)
    - Urban-type settlements under the district's jurisdiction:
      - Kompaniivka (Компаніївка)
  - Kropyvnytskyi (Кропивницький район), formerly Kirovohrad Raion
  - Mala Vyska (Маловисківський район)
    - Cities and towns under the district's jurisdiction:
      - Mala Vyska (Мала Виска)
    - Urban-type settlements under the district's jurisdiction:
      - Smoline (Смоліне)
  - Novhorodka (Новгородківський район)
    - Urban-type settlements under the district's jurisdiction:
      - Novhorodka (Новгородка)
  - Novoarkhanhelsk (Новоархангельський район)
    - Urban-type settlements under the district's jurisdiction:
      - Novoarkhanhelsk (Новоархангельськ)
  - Novomyrhorod (Новомиргородський район)
    - Cities and towns under the district's jurisdiction:
      - Novomyrhorod (Новомиргород)
    - Urban-type settlements under the district's jurisdiction:
      - Kapitanivka (Капітанівка)
  - Novoukrainka (Новоукраїнський район)
    - Cities and towns under the district's jurisdiction:
      - Novoukrainka (Новоукраїнка)
  - Oleksandriia (Олександрійський район)
    - Urban-type settlements under the district's jurisdiction:
      - Nova Praha (Нова Прага)
      - Pryiutivka (Приютівка)
  - Oleksandrivka (Олександрівський район)
    - Urban-type settlements under the district's jurisdiction:
      - Lisove (Лісове)
      - Oleksandrivka (Олександрівка)
      - Yelyzavethradka (Єлизаветградка)
  - Onufriivka (Онуфріївський район)
    - Urban-type settlements under the district's jurisdiction:
      - Onufriivka (Онуфріївка)
      - Pavlysh (Павлиш)
  - Petrove (Петрівський район)
    - Urban-type settlements under the district's jurisdiction:
      - Balakhivka (Балахівка)
      - Petrove (Петрове)
  - Svitlovodsk (Світловодський район)
  - Ustynivka (Устинівський район)
    - Urban-type settlements under the district's jurisdiction:
      - Ustynivka (Устинівка)
  - Vilshanka (Вільшанський район)
    - Urban-type settlements under the district's jurisdiction:
      - Vilshanka (Вільшанка)
  - Znamianka (Знам'янський район)
