= List of raions of Ukraine (1966–2020) =

Raions of Ukraine
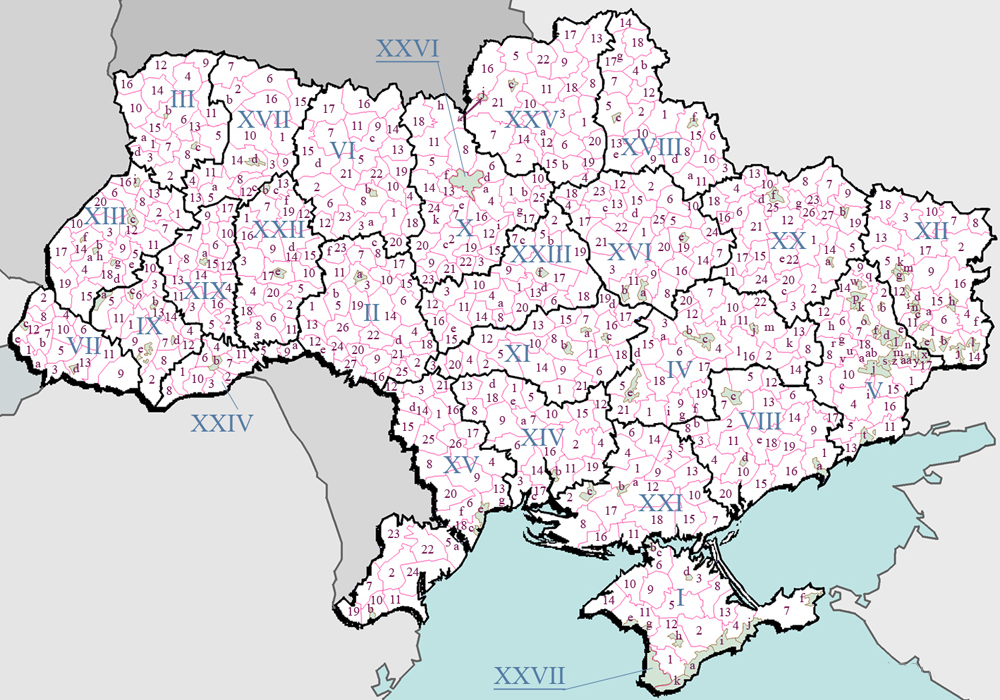
- Raions and cities of Ukraine. The numbers on the map correspond with the numbers in the table below.
- Category: Second level of subdivision
- Location: Ukraine
- Created: 1966 as part of the Soviet Administrative Reform
- Abolished: 2020 as part of the Ukrainian Administrative Reform
- Number: 490 (as of 2004)
- Populations: 52,000
- Areas: 1,200 km^{2} (460 sq mi)
- Government: Raion Council
- Subdivisions: 11,441 settlement councils

Before 2020, the second level of administrative division in Ukraine consisted of raions and cities of regional significance. The total number of second-level administrative units was 677, including 490 districts and 187 cities of regional significance.

On July 17, 2020, by the Resolution of the Verkhovna Rada of Ukraine № 807-IX "On formation and liquidation of districts", 136 new raions were created to replace the previous 490 raions, while cities of regional significance were incorporated into these new raions. Their powers were reduced, as many responsibilities were passed to lower (hromadas) and higher (oblasts) levels.

This list does not include Chernobyl Raion, which was abolished in 1988 and merged into Ivankiv Raion, about two years after the Chernobyl disaster.

== Terminology ==
Ukrainian	Ukrainian translit.	English	Comment
Район	Rajon	District	Sometimes these districts are also known as rural districts to distinguish them from raions in city or city districts.
Район у місті	Rajon u misti	Urban districts, districts of cities	

== Overview ==
=== Raions of oblasts and the autonomous republic ===
There were 490 raions in 24 oblasts and Autonomous Republic of Crimea. The number of raions per region (oblast and autonomous republic) varies between 11 and over 20. The average area of a Ukrainian raion before the reform was 1,200 km^{2} (463 sq mi). The average population was 52,000.

The city municipalities of regional (oblast) significance (abbr. MOZ) had an independent of raion jurisdiction. The number of such cities (MOZ) varied from one region to another.

Each raion consisted of urban (towns) or rural (villages), smaller municipalities that were administrated by their local councils (selsoviet, silrada) and subordinated to raion's or city's administrations. They were the lowest level of administrative division.

=== Districts of cities ===
Some cities of oblast subordination along with the two cities of national significance (Kyiv and Sevastopol) are also divided in "city raions". "City raions" have their own local administration and are subordinated directly to a city. They may contain other cities, towns, and villages.

== List of raions within each region ==
Note: region is a general term referring to oblasts, the republic and cities with special status. The population recorded in the table is listed in accordance to the latest census taken in the country, Ukrainian Census (2001). Asterisk (*) identifies raions with administrative centers located outside of them (usually separately incorporated).

=== I. Autonomous Republic of Crimea (Note: Due to Russian occupation in all or parts of Crimea, Donetsk Oblast, and Luhansk Oblast, the new names for settlements and raions after decommunization in 2016 did not ever take effect before the administrative reforms in 2020, and are therefore only in parentheses.) ===
#	Name	Center	Year	Area (km²)	Population	Density	Councils (municipalities)		
#	Name	Center	Year	Area (km²)	Population	Density	City	Town	Village
1	Bakhchysarai	Bakhchysarai	1923	1,589	92,617	58	1	2	15
2	Bilohirsk	Bilohirsk	1921	1,894	66,396	35	1	1	17
3	Dzhankoy*	Dzhankoy	1921	2,667	81,990	31	0	2	26
4	Kirovske (Islam-Terek)	Kirovske (Islam-Terek)	1935	1,209	57,686	48	1	1	11
5	Krasnohvardiiske (Qurman)	Krasnohvardiiske (Qurman)	1944	1,766	93,686	53	0	2	18
6	Krasnoperekopsk* (Perekop)	Krasnoperekopsk (Yani Kapu)	1935	1,231	31,516	26	0	0	12
7	Lenine (Yedi Quyu)	Lenine (Yedi Quyu)	1921	2,919	69,653	24	1	2	24
8	Nyzhniohirskyi	Nyzhnohirskyi	1930	1,212	55,863	46	0	1	18
9	Pervomaiske	Pervomaiske	1935	1,474	40,349	27	0	1	16
10	Rozdolne	Rozdolne	1935	1,231	37,384	30	0	2	10
11	Saky*	Saky	1935	2,257	80,302	36	0	1	23
12	Simferopol*	Simferopol	1965	1,753	148,930	85	0	4	18
13	Sovietskyi (Ichky)	Sovietskyi (Ichky)	1935	1,079	37,090	34	0	1	11
14	Chornomorske	Chornomorske	1930	1,509	34,012	23	0	1	10

=== II. Vinnytsia Oblast ===
#	Name	Center	Year	Area (km²)	Population	Density	Councils (municipalities)		
#	Name	Center	Year	Area (km²)	Population	Density	City	Town	Village
1	Bar	Bar	1923	1,102	62,464	57	1	1	27
2	Bershad	Bershad	1923	1,286	71,312	55	1	0	28
3	Vinnytsia*	Vinnytsia	1923	919	74,250	81	0	3	30
4	Haisyn	Haisyn	1923	1,102	64,855	59	1	0	26
5	Zhmerynka*	Zhmerynka	1923	1,171	44,134	38	0	1	27
6	Illintsi	Illintsi	1923	915	42,519	46	1	1	22
7	Kalynivka	Kalynivka	1923	1,086	47,656	44	1	0	28
8	Koziatyn*	Koziatyn	1923	1,131	65,031	57	0	2	32
9	Kryzhopil	Kryzhopil	1923	884	40,907	46	0	1	19
10	Lypovets	Lypovets	1923	969	44,273	46	1	1	25
11	Lityn	Lityn	1923	960	42,269	44	0	1	21
12	Mohyliv-Podilskyi*	Mohyliv-Podilskyi	1925	933	40,095	43	0	1	27
13	Murovani Kurylivtsi	Murovani Kurylivtsi	1967	886	32,768	37	0	1	24
14	Nemyriv	Nemyriv	1923	1,292	59,469	46	1	2	40
15	Orativ	Orativ	1979	874	27,345	31	0	1	27
16	Pishchanka	Pishchanka	1923	595	25,102	42	0	2	13
17	Pohrebyshche	Pohrebyshche	1923	1,200	37,721	31	1	0	26
18	Teplyk	Teplyk	1930	809	35,267	44	0	1	25
19	Tyvriv	Tyvriv	1923	882	40,773	46	1	2	25
20	Tomashpil	Tomashpil	1923	778	42,631	55	0	2	22
21	Trostianets	Trostianets	1923	945	65,060	69	0	1	17
22	Tulchyn	Tulchyn	1923	1,124	47,761	42	1	2	23
23	Khmilnyk*	Khmilnyk	1923	1,253	44,084	35	0	0	30
24	Chernivtsi	Chernivtsi	1990	592	28,661	48	0	1	13
25	Chechelnyk	Chechelnyk	1966	759	27,189	36	0	1	15
26	Sharhorod	Sharhorod	1965	1,137	64,943	57	1	0	31
27	Yampil	Yampil	1965	788	47,683	61	1	0	18

=== III. Volyn Oblast ===
#	Name	Center	Year	Area (km²)	Population	Density	Councils (municipalities)		
#	Name	Center	Year	Area (km²)	Population	Density	City	Town	Village
1	Volodymyr	Volodymyr	1940	1,038	28,241	27	1	0	20
2	Horokhiv	Horokhiv	1940	1,122	57,098	51	2	2	36
3	Ivanychi	Ivanychi	1966	645	36,050	56	0	1	23
4	Kamin-Kashyrskyi	Kamin-Kashyrskyi	1940	1,748	61,939	35	1	0	31
5	Kivertsi	Kivertsi	1940	1,414	66,412	47	1	2	24
6	Kovel	Kovel	1940	1,723	43,000	25	1	4	28
7	Lokachi	Lokachi	1965	712	25,346	36	0	1	19
8	Lutsk	Lutsk	1966	973	56,137	58	0	2	29
9	Liubeshiv	Liubeshiv	1965	1,450	36,829	25	0	1	20
10	Liuboml	Liuboml	1940	1,481	43,267	29	1	1	22
11	Manevychi	Manevychi	1965	2,265	57,341	25	0	2	30
12	Ratne	Ratne	1965	1,437	52,555	37	0	2	22
13	Rozhyshche	Rozhyshche	1940	928	42,945	46	1	1	28
14	Stara Vyzhivka	Stara Vyzhivka	1966	1,121	34,135	30	0	1	19
15	Turiisk	Turiisk	1965	1,205	29,066	24	0	2	20
16	Shatsk	Shatsk	1993	759	18,172	24	0	1	8

=== IV. Dnipropetrovsk Oblast ===
#	Name	Center	Year	Area (km²)	Population	Density	Councils (municipalities)		
#	Name	Center	Year	Area (km²)	Population	Density	City	Town	Village
1	Apostolove	Apostolove	1923	1,381	63,981	46	2	0	10
2	Vasylkivka	Vasylkivka	1923	1,330	37,149	28	0	3	10
3	Verkhnodniprovsk	Verkhnodniprovsk	1923	1,286	57,078	44	2	2	11
4	Dnipro	Dnipro	1965	1,388	77,868	56	1	2	11
5	Kryvyi Rih	Kryvyi Rih	1965	1,347	44,030	33	0	2	17
6	Krynychky	Krynychky	1923	1,684	40,372	24	0	3	18
7	Mahdalynivka	Mahdalynivka	1925	1,599	38,050	24	0	1	21
8	Mezhova	Mezhova	1923	1,244	28,499	23	0	2	9
9	Nikopol	Nikopol	1923	1,943	44,518	23	0	1	15
10	Novomoskovsk	Novomoskovsk	1923	1,997	75,185	38	1	4	14
11	Pavlohrad	Pavlohrad	1923	1,451	32,672	23	0	0	13
12	Petrykivka	Petrykivka	1991	928	26,081	28	0	3	6
13	Petropavlivka	Petropavlivka	1923	1,248	35,327	28	0	1	12
14	Pokrovske	Pokrovske	1923	1,216	41,838	34	0	2	9
15	Piatykhatky	Piatykhatky	1923	1,683	53,185	32	1	2	16
16	Synelnykove	Synelnykove	1923	1,648	41,467	25	0	3	20
17	Solone	Solone	1923	1,738	42,461	24	0	2	18
18	Sofiyivka	Sofiivka	1923	1,364	28,526	21	0	1	11
19	Tomakivka	Tomakivka	1923	1,191	31,795	27	0	1	12
20	Tsarychanka	Tsarychanka	1925	903	30,774	34	0	1	12
21	Shyroke	Shyroke	1923	1,239	31,389	25	0	2	9
22	Yurivka	Yurivka	1991	902	15,760	17	0	1	11

=== V. Donetsk Oblast ===
#	Name	Center	Year	Area (km²)	Population	Density	Councils (municipalities)		
#	Name	Center	Year	Area (km²)	Population	Density	City	Town	Village
1	Amvrosiivka	Amvrosiivka	1923	1,455	55,072	38			
2	Bakhmut	Bakhmut	1923	1,687	53,866	32			
3	Velyka Novosilka	Velyka Novosilka	1923	1,901	49,272	26			
4	Volnovakha	Volnovakha	1923	1,848	92,630	50			
5	Nikolske	Nikolske	1925	1,221	31,169	26			
6	Dobropillia	Dobropillia	1935	949	20,482	22			
7	Kostiantynivka	Kostiantynivka	1923	1,172	21,032	18			
8	Pokrovsk	Pokrovsk	1923	1,316	37,384	28			
9	Lyman	Lyman	1923	1,018	24,781	24			
10	Marinka	Marinka	1923	1,350	38,861	29			
11	Novoazovsk	Novoazovsk	1923	1,000	22,883	23			
12	Oleksandrivka	Oleksandrivka	1923	1,010	29,241	29			
13	Manhush	Manhush	1966	792	90,434	114			
14	Sloviansk	Sloviansk	1923	1,274	39,165	31			
15	Starobesheve	Starobesheve	1923	1,255	56,048	45			
16	Telmanove (Boikivske)	Telmanove (Boikivske)	1934	1,340	35,058	26			
17	Shakhtarsk	Shakhtarsk	1965	1,194	23,570	20			
18	Yasynuvata	Yasynuvata	1965	809	30,165	37			

=== VI. Zhytomyr Oblast ===
#	Name	Center	Year	Area (km²)	Population	Density	Councils (municipalities)		
#	Name	Center	Year	Area (km²)	Population	Density	City	Town	Village
1	Andrushivka	Andrushivka		956	38,785	41			
2	Baranivka	Baranivka		1,000	46,001	46			
3	Berdychiv	Berdychiv		865	34,298	40			
4	Brusyliv	Brusyliv		626	18,142	29			
5	Khoroshiv	Khoroshiv		870	38,409	44			
6	Romaniv	Romaniv		928	33,282	36			
7	Yemilchyne	Yemilchyne		2,112	41,707	20			
8	Zhytomyr	Zhytomyr		1,441	68,449	48			
9	Korosten	Korosten		1,739	34,030	20			
10	Korostyshiv	Korostyshiv		974	43,444	45			
11	Luhyny	Luhyny		994	20,823	21			
12	Liubar	Liubar		757	31,046	41			
13	Malyn	Malyn		1,485	51,997	35			
14	Narodychi	Narodychi		1,284	11,439	9			
15	Zviahel	Zviahel		2,098	52,131	25			
16	Ovruch	Ovruch		3,225	67,827	21			
17	Olevsk	Olevsk		2,248	46,883	21			
18	Popilnia	Popilnia		1,037	36,968	36			
19	Radomyshl	Radomyshl		1,297	42,299	33			
20	Ruzhyn	Ruzhyn		1,002	34,299	34			
21	Pulyny	Pulyny		853	25,921	30			
22	Cherniakhiv	Cherniakhiv		850	33,592	40			
23	Chudniv	Chudniv		1,037	42,955	41			

=== VII. Zakarpattia Oblast ===
#	Name	Center	Year	Area (km²)	Population	Density	Councils (municipalities)		
#	Name	Center	Year	Area (km²)	Population	Density	City	Town	Village
1	Berehove	Berehove		654	53,841	82			
2	Velykyy Bereznyi	Velykyi Bereznyi		810	28,016	35			
3	Vynohradiv	Vynohradiv		695	117,863	170			
4	Volovets	Volovets		544	25,336	47			
5	Irshava	Irshava		944	100,881	107			
6	Mizhhiria	Mizhhiria		1,163	50,057	43			
7	Mukachevo	Mukachevo		997	101,572	102			
8	Perechyn	Perechyn		631	31,790	50			
9	Rakhiv	Rakhiv		1,892	90,811	48			
10	Svaliava	Svaliava		676	55,468	82			
11	Tiachiv	Tiachiv		1,818	172,389	95			
12	Uzhhorod	Uzhhorod		866	65,514	76			
13	Khust	Khust		998	96,561	97			

=== VIII. Zaporizhzhia Oblast ===
#	Name	Center	Year	Area (km²)	Population	Density	Councils (municipalities)		
#	Name	Center	Year	Area (km²)	Population	Density	City	Town	Village
1	Berdiansk	Berdiansk		1,776	31,631	18			
2	Vasylivka	Vasylivka		1,621	74,384	46			
3	Velyka Bilozerka	Velyka Bilozerka		469	9,337	20			
4	Vesele	Vesele		1,129	25,542	23			
5	Vilniansk	Vilniansk		1,288	50,536	39			
6	Huliaipole	Huliaipole		1,300	34,529	27			
7	Zaporizhia	Zaporizhzhia		1,462	54,777	37			
8	Kamianka-Dniprovska	Kamianka-Dniprovska		1,179	45,792	39			
9	Bilmak	Bilmak		1,335	27,578	21			
10	Melitopol	Melitopol		1,787	56,104	31			
11	Mykhailivka	Mykhailivka		1,067	33,046	31			
12	Novomykolaivka	Novomykolaivka		915	19,564	21			
13	Orikhiv	Orikhiv		1,598	54,183	34			
14	Polohy	Polohy		1,344	48,018	36			
15	Pryazovske	Pryazovske		1,947	32,909	17			
16	Prymorsk	Prymorsk		1,398	35,223	25			
17	Rozivka	Rozivka		610	11,944	20			
18	Tokmak	Tokmak		1,442	27,847	19			
19	Chernihivka	Chernihivka		1,200	22,249	19			
20	Yakymivka	Yakymivka		1,856	37,963	20			

=== IX. Ivano-Frankivsk Oblast ===
#	Name	Center	Year	Area (km²)	Population	Density	Councils (municipalities)		
#	Name	Center	Year	Area (km²)	Population	Density	City	Town	Village
1	Bohorodchany	Bohorodchany		799	70,098	88			
2	Verkhovyna	Verkhovyna		1,254	30,048	24			
3	Halych	Halych		723	65,674	91			
4	Horodenka	Horodenka		747	60,804	81			
5	Dolyna	Dolyna		1,248	71,058	57			
6	Kalush	Kalush		647	62,705	97			
7	Kolomyia	Kolomyia		1,026	105,788	103			
8	Kosiv	Kosiv		903	90,400	100			
9	Nadvirna	Nadvirna		1,294	113,611	88			
10	Rohatyn	Rohatyn		815	51,063	63			
11	Rozhniativ	Rozhniativ		1,303	75,513	58			
12	Sniatyn	Sniatyn		602	68,979	115			
13	Tysmenytsia	Tysmenytsia		736	85,269	116			
14	Tlumach	Tlumach		684	52,772	77			

=== X. Kyiv Oblast ===
#	Name	Center	Year	Area (km²)	Population	Density	Councils (municipalities)		
#	Name	Center	Year	Area (km²)	Population	Density	City	Town	Village
1	Baryshivka	Baryshivka		958	41,287	43			
2	Bila Tserkva	Bila Tserkva		1,277	55,536	43			
3	Bohuslav	Bohuslav		772	40,602	53			
4	Boryspil	Boryspil		1,485	54,633	37			
5	Borodianka	Borodianka		934	57,790	62			
6	Brovary	Brovary		1,188	77,518	65			
7	Vasylkiv	Vasylkiv		1,184	70,705	60			
8	Vyshhorod	Vyshhorod		2,031	72,446	36			
9	Volodarka	Volodarka		646	23,384	36			
10	Zghurivka	Zghurivka		763	22,671	30			
11	Ivankiv	Ivankiv		3,616	35,374	10			
12	Kaharlyk	Kaharlyk		926	37,791	41			
13	Kyiv-Sviatoshyn	Kyiv		726	156,015	215			
14	Makariv	Makariv		1,364	47,915	35			
15	Myronivka	Myronivka		904	40,488	45			
16	Obukhiv	Obukhiv		773	71,606	93			
17	Pereiaslav-Khmelnytskyi	Pereiaslav		1,456	36,892	25			
18	Poliske	Krasiatychi		1,288	7,567	6			
19	Rokytne	Rokytne		662	36,400	55			
20	Skvyra	Skvyra		980	44,267	45			
21	Stavyshche	Stavyshche		674	28,327	42			
22	Tarashcha	Tarashcha		758	36,352	48			
23	Tetiiv	Tetiiv		758	37,098	49			
24	Fastiv	Fastiv		897	37,538	42			
25	Yahotyn	Yahotyn		793	40,822	51			

=== XI. Kirovohrad Oblast ===
#	Name	Center	Year	Area (km²)	Population	Density	Councils (municipalities)		
#	Name	Center	Year	Area (km²)	Population	Density	City	Town	Village
1	Bobrynets	Bobrynets		1,496	31,593	21			
2	Vilshanka	Vilshanka		645	16,401	25			
3	Haivoron	Haivoron		695	43,573	63			
4	Holovanivsk	Holovanivsk		992	36,852	37			
5	Dobrovelychkivka	Dobrovelychkivka		1,297	43,097	33			
6	Dolynska	Dolynska		1,276	38,263	30			
7	Znamianka	Znamianka		1,334	30,078	23			
8	Kompaniivka	Kompaniivka		967	18,322	19			
9	Kropyvnytskyi	Kropyvnytskyi		1,557	37,711	24			
10	Mala Vyska	Mala Vyska		1,248	51,494	41			
11	Novhorodka	Novhorodka		997	19,009	19			
12	Novoarkhanhelsk	Novoarkhanhelsk		1,206	31,513	26			
13	Novomyrhorod	Novomyrhorod		1,032	35,807	35			
14	Novoukrainka	Novoukrainka		1,668	48,807	29			
15	Oleksandrivka	Oleksandrivka		1,159	36,108	31			
16	Oleksandriia	Oleksandriia		1,855	41,156	22			
17	Onufriivka	Onufriivka		889	21,847	25			
18	Petrove	Petrove		1,195	28,978	24			
19	Svitlovodsk	Svitlovodsk		1,213	16,647	14			
20	Blahovishchenske	Blahovishchenske		701	28,819	41			
21	Ustynivka	Ustynivka		942	16,795	18			

=== XII. Luhansk Oblast ===
#	Name	Center	Year	Area (km²)	Population	Density	Councils (municipalities)		
#	Name	Center	Year	Area (km²)	Population	Density	City	Town	Village
1	Antratsyt	Antratsyt		1,662	36,971	22			
2	Bilovodsk	Bilovodsk		1,597	27,559	17			
3	Bilokurakyne	Bilokurakyne		1,436	23,807	17			
4	Krasnodon (Sorokyne)	Krasnodon (Sorokyne)		1,386	32,846	24			
5	Kreminna	Kreminna		1,627	51,927	32			
6	Lutuhyne	Lutuhyne		1,057	73,914	70			
7	Markivka	Markivka		1,166	19,002	16			
8	Milove	Milove		971	17,415	18			
9	Novoaidar	Novoaidar		1,536	28,451	19			
10	Novopskov	Novopskov		1,623	38,322	24			
11	Perevalsk	Perevalsk		807	87,383	108			
12	Popasna	Popasna		1,325	50,559	38			
13	Svatove	Svatove		1,739	43,069	25			
14	Sverdlovsk (Dovzhansk)	Sverdlovsk (Dovzhansk)		1,132	14,574	13			
15	Slovianoserbsk	Slovianoserbsk		1,113	62,125	56			
16	Stanytsia-Luhanska	Stanytsia Luhanska		1,896	52,762	28			
17	Starobilsk	Starobilsk		1,582	57,755	37			
18	Troitske	Troitske		1,633	25,704	16			

=== XIII. Lviv Oblast ===
#	Name	Center	Year	Area (km²)	Population	Density	Councils (municipalities)		
#	Name	Center	Year	Area (km²)	Population	Density	City	Town	Village
1	Brody	Brody		1,162	63,545	55			
2	Busk	Busk		850	50,800	60			
3	Horodok	Horodok		726	74,206	102			
4	Drohobych	Drohobych		1,210	76,276	63			
5	Zhydachiv	Zhydachiv		996	80,469	81			
6	Zhovkva	Zhovkva		1,294	108,863	84			
7	Zolochiv	Zolochiv		1,097	74,550	68			
8	Kamianka-Buzka	Kamianka-Buzka		868	61,869	71			
9	Mykolaiv	Mykolaiv		698	66,247	95			
10	Mostyska	Mostyska		845	61,892	73			
11	Peremyshliany	Peremyshliany		918	47,705	52			
12	Pustomyty	Pustomyty		948	111,872	118			
13	Radekhiv	Radekhiv		1,144	52,457	46			
14	Sambir	Sambir		934	74,574	80			
15	Skole	Skole		1,471	50,210	34			
16	Sokal	Sokal		1,574	98,098	62			
17	Staryi Sambir	Staryi Sambir		1,245	82,191	66			
18	Stryi	Stryi		802	63,322	79			
19	Turka	Turka		1,193	54,769	46			
20	Yavoriv	Yavoriv		1,542	123,546	80			

=== XIV. Mykolaiv Oblast ===
#	Name	Center	Year	Area (km²)	Population	Density	Councils (municipalities)		
#	Name	Center	Year	Area (km²)	Population	Density	City	Town	Village
1	Arbuzynka	Arbuzynka		969	24,783	26			
2	Bashtanka	Bashtanka		1,706	41,434	24			
3	Berezanka	Berezanka		1,378	24,988	18			
4	Bereznehuvate	Bereznehuvate		1,264	23,053	18			
5	Bratske	Bratske		1,129	21,226	19			
6	Veselynove	Veselynove		1,245	27,044	22			
7	Voznesensk	Voznesensk		1,392	35,907	26			
8	Vradiivka	Vradiivka		801	20,947	26			
9	Domanivka	Domanivka		1,458	28,945	20			
10	Yelanets	Yelanets		1,018	18,411	18			
11	Vitovka	Mykolaiv		1,460	54,655	37			
12	Kazanka	Kazanka		1,349	24,745	18			
13	Kryve Ozero	Kryve Ozero		814	28,494	35			
14	Mykolaiv	Mykolaiv		1,430	34,980	24			
15	Novyi Buh	Novyi Buh		1,243	34,167	27			
16	Nova Odesa	Nova Odesa		1,428	37,385	26			
17	Ochakiv	Ochakiv		1,500	16,916	11			
18	Pervomaisk	Pervomaisk		1,319	37,050	28			
19	Snihurivka	Snihurivka		1,350	47,538	35			

=== XV. Odesa Oblast ===
#	Name	Center	Year	Area (km²)	Population	Density	Councils (municipalities)		
#	Name	Center	Year	Area (km²)	Population	Density	City	Town	Village
1	Ananiv	Ananiv		1,050	32,619	31			
2	Artsyi	Artsyz		1,379	51,251	37			
3	Balta	Balta		1,317	48,697	37			
4	Berezivka	Berezivka		1,637	36,173	22			
5	Bilhorod-Dnistrovskyi	Bilhorod-Dnistrovskyi		1,852	62,255	34			
6	Biliaivka	Biliaivka		1,497	103,988	69			
7	Bolhrad	Bolhrad		1,364	73,991	54			
8	Velyka Mykhailivka	Velyka Mykhailivka		1,436	32,703	23			
9	Ivanivka	Ivanivka		1,162	29,184	25			
10	Izmail	Izmail		1,194	54,550	46			
11	Kiliia	Kiliia		1,358	58,707	43			
12	Kodyma	Kodyma		818	34,523	42			
13	Lyman	Dobroslav		1,499	67,207	45			
14	Podilsk	Podilsk		1,037	30,627	30			
15	Okny	Okny		1,013	22,872	23			
16	Liubashivka	Liubashivka		1,100	33,544	30			
17	Mykolaivka	Mykolaivka		1,093	20,158	18			
18	Ovidiopol	Ovidiopol		829	60,294	73			
19	Reni	Reni		861	39,903	46			
20	Rozdilna	Rozdilna		1,368	56,727	41			
21	Savran	Savran		617	22,176	36			
22	Sarata	Sarata		1,474	49,911	34			
23	Tarutyne	Tarutyne		1,874	45,175	24			
24	Tatarbunary	Tatarbunary		1,748	41,573	24			
25	Zakharivka	Zakharivka		956	20,944	22			
26	Shyriaieve	Shyriaieve		1,502	29,754	20			

=== XVI. Poltava Oblast ===
#	Name	Center	Year	Area (km²)	Population	Density	Councils (municipalities)		
#	Name	Center	Year	Area (km²)	Population	Density	City	Town	Village
1	Velyka Bahachka	Velyka Bahachka		1,019	30,103	30			
2	Hadiach	Hadiach		1,595	64,011	40			
3	Hlobyne	Hlobyne		2,474	58,726	24			
4	Hrebinka	Hrebinka		595	26,257	44			
5	Dykanka	Dykanka		679	21,903	32			
6	Zinkiv	Zinkiv		1,361	42,308	31			
7	Karlivka	Karlivka		854	41,641	49			
8	Kobeliaky	Kobeliaky		1,823	54,091	30			
9	Kozelshchyna	Kozelshchyna		927	24,849	27			
10	Kotelva	Kotelva		795	21,564	27			
11	Kremenchuk	Kremenchuk		1,023	43,346	42			
12	Lokhvytsia	Lokhvytsia		1,303	51,440	39			
13	Lubny	Lubny		1,375	39,970	29			
14	Mashivka	Mashivka		889	22,894	26			
15	Myrhorod	Myrhorod		1,539	41,225	27			
16	Novi Sanzhary	Novi Sanzhary		1,272	39,995	31			
17	Orzhytsia	Orzhytsia		980	29,525	30			
18	Pyriatyn	Pyriatyn		863	36,467	42			
19	Poltava	Poltava		1,260	66,351	53			
20	Reshetylivka	Reshetylivka		1,010	29,741	29			
21	Semenivka	Semenivka		1,275	32,575	26			
22	Khorol	Khorol		1,062	42,169	40			
23	Chornukhy	Chornukhy		682	16,227	24			
24	Chutove	Chutove		861	26,816	31			
25	Shyshaky	Shyshaky		799	24,056	30			

=== XVII. Rivne Oblast ===
#	Name	Center	Year	Area (km²)	Population	Density	Councils (municipalities)		
#	Name	Center	Year	Area (km²)	Population	Density	City	Town	Village
1	Berezne	Berezne		1,715	63,748	37			
2	Volodymyrets	Volodymyrets		1,949	61,714	32			
3	Hoshcha	Hoshcha		692	38,846	56			
4	Demydivka	Demydivka		377	16,483	44			
5	Dubno	Dubno		1,199	48,635	41			
6	Dubrovytsia	Dubrovytsia		1,817	50,939	28			
7	Zarichne	Zarichne		1,442	36,078	25			
8	Zdolbuniv	Zdolbuniv		659	58,805	89			
9	Korets	Korets		720	39,303	55			
10	Kostopil	Kostopil		1,497	65,559	44			
11	Mlyniv	Mlyniv		945	41,614	44			
12	Ostroh	Ostroh		693	31,235	45			
13	Radyvyliv	Radyvyliv		745	40,029	54			
14	Rivne	Rivne		1,176	87,998	75			
15	Rokytne	Rokytne		2,350	51,892	22			
16	Sarny	Sarny		1,972	98,836	50			

=== XVIII. Sumy Oblast ===
#	Name	Center	Year	Area (km²)	Population	Density	Councils (municipalities)		
#	Name	Center	Year	Area (km²)	Population	Density	City	Town	Village
1	Bilopillia	Bilopillia		1,443	61,321	42			
2	Buryn	Buryn		1,104	36,933	33			
3	Velyka Pysarivka	Velyka Pysarivka		831	26,997	32			
4	Hlukhiv	Hlukhiv		1,661	31,944	19			
5	Konotop	Konotop		1,667	39,398	24			
6	Krasnopillia	Krasnopillia		1,351	33,978	25			
7	Krolevets	Krolevets		1,284	46,789	36			
8	Lebedyn	Lebedyn		1,542	27,743	18			
9	Lypova Dolyna	Lypova Dolyna		882	23,342	26			
10	Nedryhailiv	Nedryhailiv		1,036	31,231	30			
11	Okhtyrka	Okhtyrka		1,287	31,534	25			
12	Putyvl	Putyvl		1,103	34,402	31			
13	Romny	Romny		1,859	46,254	25			
14	Seredyna-Buda	Seredyna-Buda		1,123	20,799	19			
15	Sumy	Sumy		1,855	62,701	34			
16	Trostianets	Trostianets		1,048	41,977	40			
17	Shostka	Shostka		1,219	24,522	20			
18	Yampil	Yampil		943	30,200	32			

=== XIX. Ternopil Oblast ===
#	Name	Center	Year	Area (km²)	Population	Density	Councils (municipalities)		
#	Name	Center	Year	Area (km²)	Population	Density	City	Town	Village
1	Berezhany	Berezhany		661	44,813	68			
2	Borschiv	Borshchiv		1,006	75,340	75			
3	Buchach	Buchach		802	64,974	81			
4	Husiatyn	Husiatyn		1,016	67,074	66			
5	Zalishchyky	Zalischyky		684	53,466	78			
6	Zbarazh	Zbarazh		863	60,308	70			
7	Zboriv	Zboriv		977	47,089	48			
8	Kozova	Kozova		694	41,827	60			
9	Kremenets	Kremenets		918	73,441	80			
10	Lanivtsi	Lanivtsi		632	33,188	53			
11	Monastyryska	Monastyryska		558	34,552	62			
12	Pidvolochysk	Pidvolochysk		837	46,190	55			
13	Pidhaitsi	Pidhaitsi		496	22,951	46			
14	Terebovlia	Terebovl		1,130	70,945	63			
15	Ternopil	Ternopil		749	60,991	81			
16	Chortkiv	Chortkiv		903	80,944	90			
17	Shumsk	Shumsk		838	36,568	44			

=== XX. Kharkiv Oblast ===
#	Name	Center	Year	Area (km²)	Population	Density	Councils (municipalities)		
#	Name	Center	Year	Area (km²)	Population	Density	City	Town	Village
1	Balakliia	Balakliia		1,986	92,595	47			
2	Barvinkove	Barvinkove		1,365	31,501	23			
3	Blyzniuky	Blyzniuky		1,380	25,695	19			
4	Bohodukhiv	Bohodukhiv		1,160	47,456	41			
5	Borova	Borova		875	21,128	24			
6	Valky	Valky		1,011	36,531	36			
7	Velykyi Burluk	Velykyi Burluk		1,221	28,155	23			
8	Vovchansk	Vovchansk		1,889	54,942	29			
9	Dvorichna	Dvorichna		1,112	22,267	20			
10	Derhachi	Derhachi		900	98,600	110			
11	Zachepylivka	Zachepylivka		794	18,834	24			
12	Zmiiv	Zmiiv		1,365	81,477	60			
13	Zolochiv	Zolochiv		969	34,063	35			
14	Izium	Izium		1,553	22,002	14			
15	Kehychivka	Kehychivka		783	23,454	30			
16	Kolomak	Kolomak		330	9,007	27			
17	Krasnohrad	Krasnohrad		983	49,240	50			
18	Krasnokutsk	Krasnokutsk		1,041	33,122	32			
19	Kupiansk	Kupiansk		1,280	29,581	23			
20	Lozova	Lozova		1,404	34,325	24			
21	Nova Vodolaha	Nova Vodolaha		1,183	40,794	34			
22	Pervomaiskyi	Pervomaiskyi		1,194	19,879	17			
23	Pechenihy	Pechenihy		467	11,824	25			
24	Sakhnovshchyna	Sakhnovshchyna		1,170	26,086	22			
25	Kharkiv	Kharkiv		1,403	187,086	133			
26	Chuhuiv	Chuhuiv		1,149	50,945	44			
27	Shevchenkove	Shevchenkove		977	23,213	24			

=== XXI. Kherson Oblast ===
#	Name	Center	Year	Area (km²)	Population	Density	Councils (municipalities)		
#	Name	Center	Year	Area (km²)	Population	Density	City	Town	Village
1	Beryslav	Beryslav		1,721	55,915	32			
2	Bilozerka	Bilozerka		1,534	68,382	45			
3	Velyka Lepetyka	Velyka Lepetykha		1,000	20,660	21			
4	Velyka Oleksandrivka	Velyka Oleksandrivka		1,540	31,233	20			
5	Verkhniy Rohachyk	Verkhnii Rohachyk		915	14,290	16			
6	Vysokopillia	Vysokopillia		701	17,920	26			
7	Henichesk	Henichesk		3,008	66,291	22			
8	Holo Prystan	Hola Prystan		3,411	64,785	19			
9	Hornostaivka	Hornostaivka		1,018	21,942	22			
10	Ivanivka	Ivanivka		1,120	17,944	16			
11	Kalanchak	Kalanchak		916	25,748	28			
12	Kakhovka	Kakhovka		1,451	40,104	28			
13	Nyzhni Sirohozy	Nyzhni Sirohozy		1,209	19,697	16			
14	Novovorontsovka	Novovorontsovka		1,005	24,595	24			
15	Novotroitske	Novotroitske		2,298	43,026	19			
16	Skadovsk	Skadovsk		1,456	50,107	34			
17	Oleshky	Oleshky		1,759	72,264	41			
18	Chaplynka	Chaplynka		1,722	40,194	23			

=== XXII. Khmelnytskyi Oblast ===
#	Name	Center	Year	Area (km²)	Population	Density	Councils (municipalities)		
#	Name	Center	Year	Area (km²)	Population	Density	City	Town	Village
1	Bilohiria	Bilohiria		776	31,655	41			
2	Vinkivtsi	Vinkivtsi		653	31,043	48			
3	Volochysk	Volochysk		1,104	60,788	55			
4	Horodok	Horodok		1,111	58,655	53			
5	Derazhnia	Derazhnia		916	38,149	42			
6	Dunaivti	Dunaivtsi		1,182	73,066	62			
7	Iziaslav	Iziaslav		1,253	54,199	43			
8	Kamianets-Podilskyi	Kamianets-Podilskyi		1,538	75,673	49			
9	Krasyliv	Krasyliv		1,181	61,319	52			
10	Letychiv	Letychiv		951	34,440	36			
11	Nova Ushytsia	Nova Ushytsia		853	36,478	43			
12	Polonne	Polonne		866	51,234	59			
13	Slavuta	Slavuta		1,163	37,424	32			
14	Starokostiantyniv	Starokostiantyniv		1,250	37,199	30			
15	Stara Syniava	Stara Syniava		662	24,950	38			
16	Teofipol	Teofipol		716	32,263	45			
17	Khmelnytskyi	Khmelnytskyi		1,227	54,931	45			
18	Chemerivtsi	Chemerivtsi		928	50,949	55			
19	Shepetika	Shepetivka		1,162	40,616	35			
20	Yarmolyntsi	Yarmolyntsi		898	40,024	45			

=== XXIII. Cherkasy Oblast ===
#	Name	Center	Year	Area (km²)	Population	Density	Councils (municipalities)		
#	Name	Center	Year	Area (km²)	Population	Density	City	Town	Village
1	Horodysche	Horodyshche		866	49,307	57			
2	Drabiv	Drabiv		1,161	42,635	37			
3	Zhashkiv	Zhashkiv		964	45,626	47			
4	Zvenyhorodka	Zvenyhorodka		1,010	53,685	53			
5	Zolotonosha	Zolotonosha		1,493	48,561	33			
6	Kamianka	Kamianka		725	35,447	49			
7	Kaniv	Kaniv		1,283	24,703	19			
8	Katerynopil	Katerynopil		672	28,905	43			
9	Korsun-Shevchenkivskyi	Korsun-Shevchenkivskyi		896	49,990	56			
10	Lysianka	Lysianka		746	28,721	39			
11	Mankivka	Mankivka		765	33,112	43			
12	Monastyrysche	Monastyryshche		719	40,587	56			
13	Smila	Smila		934	38,215	41			
14	Talne	Talne		917	43,581	48			
15	Uman	Uman		1,400	51,505	37			
16	Khrystynivka	Khrystynivka		632	39,222	62			
17	Cherkasy	Cherkasy		1,609	79,061	49			
18	Chyhyryn	Chyhyryn		1,217	36,120	30			
19	Chornobai	Chornobai		1,554	49,710	32			
20	Shpola	Shpola		1,105	52,077	47			

=== XXIV. Chernivtsi Oblast ===
#	Name	Center	Year	Area (km²)	Population	Density	Councils (municipalities)		
#	Name	Center	Year	Area (km²)	Population	Density	City	Town	Village
1	Vyzhnytsia	Vyzhnytsia		904	60,005	66			
2	Hertsa	Hertsa		309	32,247	104			
3	Hlyboka	Hlyboka		674	72,682	108			
4	Zastavna	Zastavna		619	56,306	91			
5	Kelmentsi	Kelmentsi		670	48,397	72			
6	Kitsman	Kitsman		608	72,898	120			
7	Novoselytsia	Novoselytsia		738	87,454	119			
8	Putyla	Putyla		878	25,363	29			
9	Sokyriany	Sokyriany		665	48,909	74			
10	Storozhynets	Storozhynets		1,160	95,302	82			
11	Khotyn	Khotyn		716	72,291	101			

=== XXV. Chernihiv Oblast ===
#	Name	Center	Year	Area (km²)	Population	Density	Councils (municipalities)		
#	Name	Center	Year	Area (km²)	Population	Density	City	Town	Village
1	Bakhmach	Bakhmach		1,488	56,507	38			
2	Bobrovytsia	Bobrovytsia		1,418	41,184	29			
3	Borzna	Borzna		1,608	43,698	27			
4	Varva	Varva		590	20,005	34			
5	Horodnia	Horodnia		1,566	36,306	23			
6	Ichnia	Ichnia		1,576	41,134	26			
7	Kozelets	Kozelets		2,600	61,652	24			
8	Korop	Korop		1,312	32,122	24			
9	Koriukivka	Koriukivka		1,424	33,676	24			
10	Kulykivka	Kulykivka		944	22,544	24			
11	Mena	Mena		1,377	45,592	33			
12	Nizhyn	Nizhyn		1,514	36,506	24			
13	Novhorod-Siverskyi	Novhorod-Siverskyi		1,804	36,091	20			
14	Nosivka	Nosivka		1,152	37,553	33			
15	Pryluky	Pryluky		1,796	45,042	25			
16	Ripky	Ripky		2,106	37,614	18			
17	Semenivka	Semenivka		1,470	23,505	16			
18	Sosnytsia	Sosnytsia		916	24,878	27			
19	Sribne	Sribne		579	14,577	25			
20	Talalaivka	Talalaivka		633	16,726	26			
21	Chernihiv	Chernihiv		2,555	61,296	24			
22	Snovsk	Snovsk		1,283	30,572	24			

=== XXVI. Kyiv ===
#	Name	Year	Area (km²)	Population	Density
1	Holosiiv	2001	156	202,993	1,301
2	Darnytsia	1935	134	282,359	2,107
3	Desna	1987	148	336,209	2,272
4	Dnipro	1969	67	331,618	4,950
5	Obolon	1975	110	306,173	2,783
6	Pechersk	1945	20	131,127	6,556
7	Podil	1921	34	180,424	5,307
8	Sviatoshyn	2001	103	315,410	3,062
9	Solomianka	1921	40	287,801	7,195
10	Shevchenko	1937	27	237,213	8,786

=== XXVII. Sevastopol ===
#	Name	Year	Area (km²)	Population	Density
1	Balaklava	1921	469	25,719	55
2	Haharin	1975	65	120,842	1,859
3	Lenin	1961	19	110,949	5,839
4	Nakhimov	1957	311	121,982	392
