= List of cities in Kirovohrad Oblast =

Location of cities in Kirovohrad Oblast

There are 12 populated places in Kirovohrad Oblast, Ukraine, that have been officially granted city status (Ukrainian: місто, romanized: misto) by the Verkhovna Rada, the country's parliament. Settlements with more than 10,000 people are eligible for city status, although the status is typically also granted to settlements of historical or regional importance. As of 5 December 2001, the date of the first and only official census in the country since independence, (Note: As of 11 July 2023) the most populous city in the oblast was the regional capital, Kropyvnytskyi, with a population of 254,103 people, while the least populous city was Blahovishchenske, with 7,526 people. After the enactment of decommunization laws, two cities within the oblast, including the regional capital, were renamed in 2016 for their former names' connection to people, places, events, and organizations associated with the Soviet Union. The renamed cities Blahovishchenske and Kropyvnytskyi were previously named Ulianovka and Kirovohrad, respectively.

From independence in 1991 to 2020, four cities in the oblast were designated as cities of regional significance (municipalities), which had self-government under city councils, while the oblast's remaining eight cities were located amongst twenty-one raions (districts) as cities of district significance, which are subordinated to the governments of the raions. On 18 July 2020, an administrative reform abolished and merged the oblast's raions and cities of regional significance into four new, expanded raions. The four raions that make up the oblast are Holovanivsk, Kropyvnytskyi, Novoukrainka, and Oleksandriia.

== List of cities ==
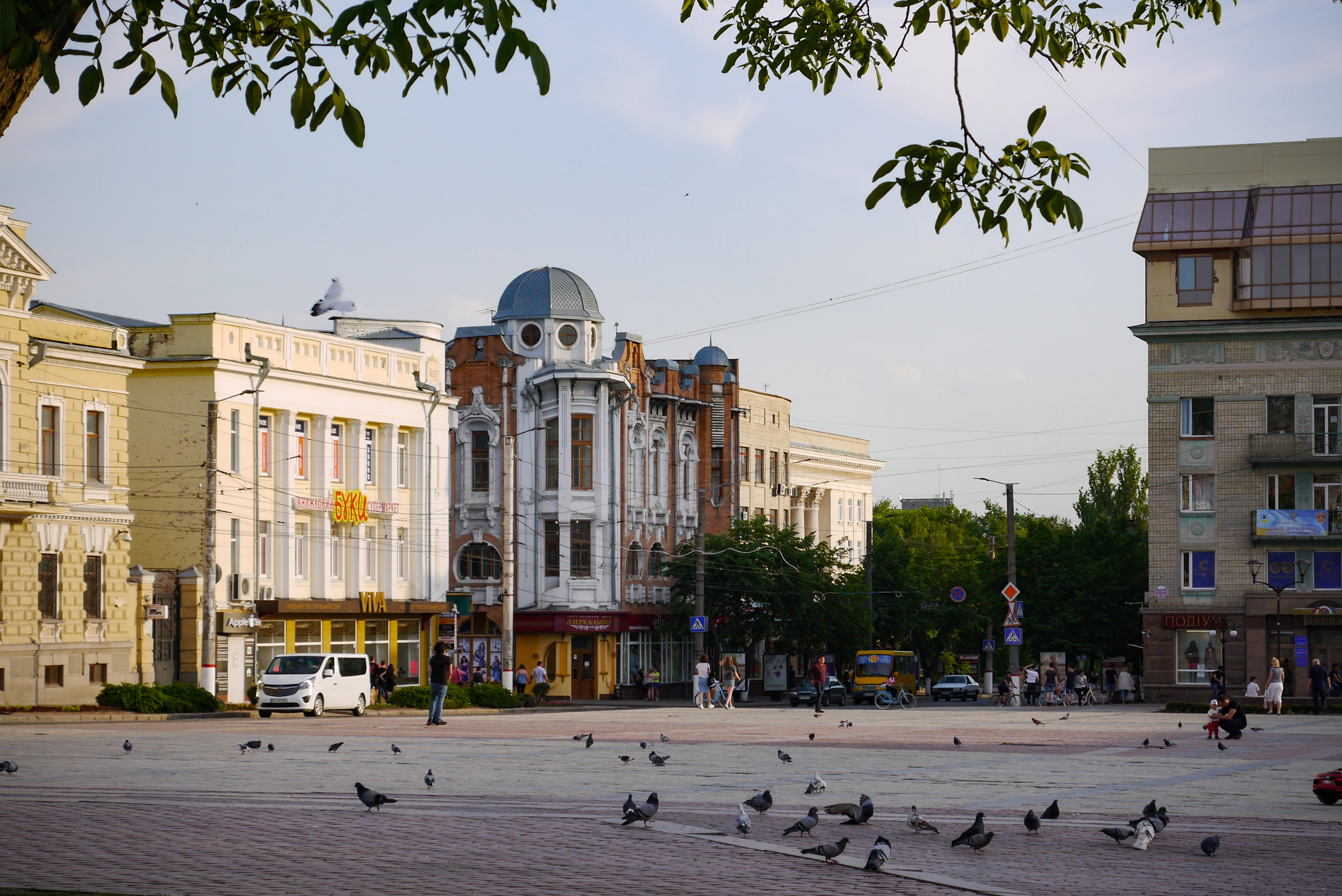
Kropyvnytskyi, capital and most populous city in Kirovohrad Oblast

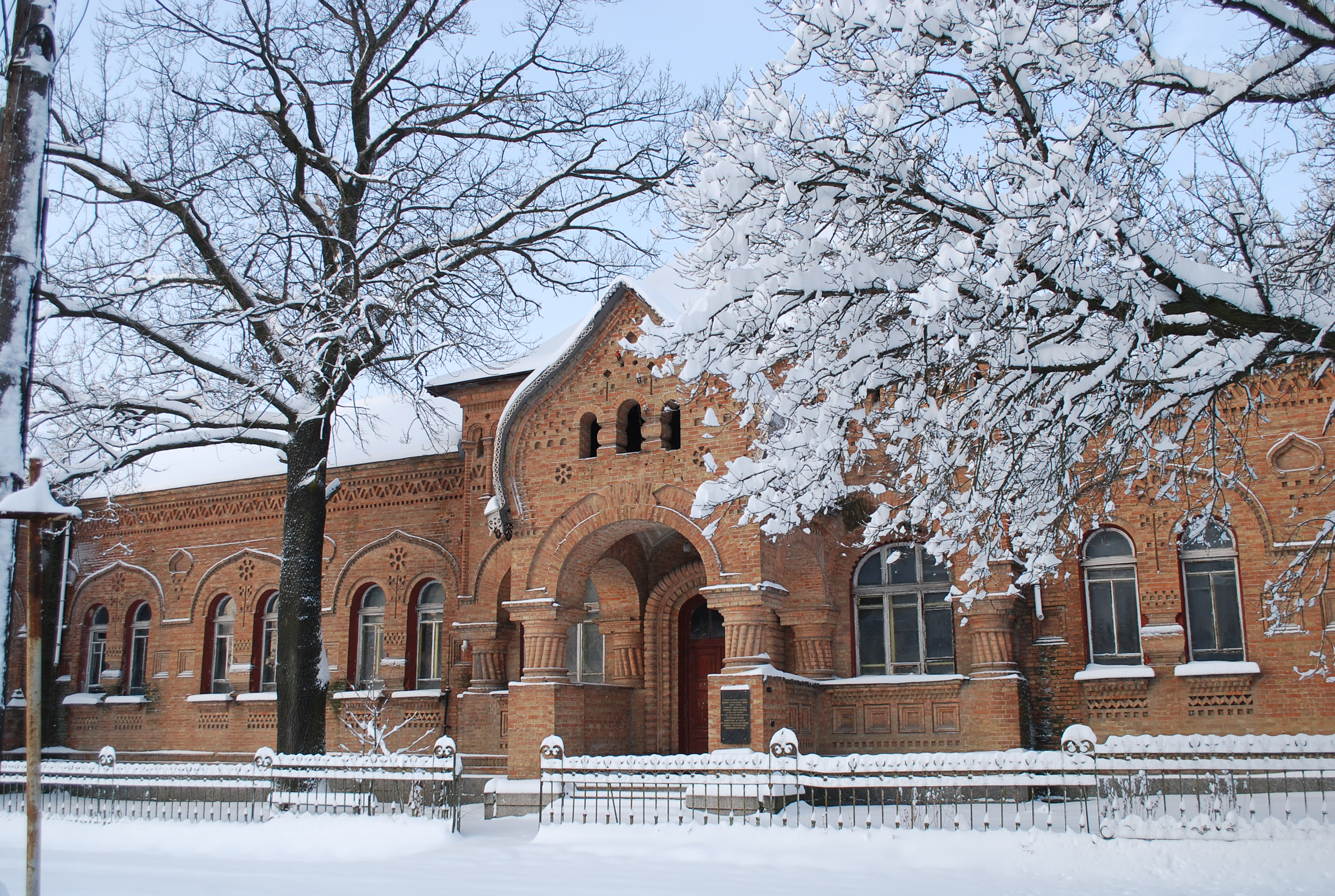
Novomyrhorod, a manufacturing center and former capital of New Serbia

Cities in Kirovohrad Oblast
Name	Name (in Ukrainian) (Note: Links to the Ukrainian Wikipedia articles for each city)	Raion (district)	Population (2022 estimates)	Population (2001 census)	Population change
Blahovishchenske	Благовіщенське	Holovanivsk	5,825	7,526	−22.60%
Bobrynets	Бобринець	Kropyvnytskyi	10,396	12,300	−15.48%
Dolynska	Долинська	Kropyvnytskyi	18,225	18,768	−2.89%
Haivoron	Гайворон	Holovanivsk	14,010	16,126	−13.12%
Kropyvnytskyi	Кропивницький	Kropyvnytskyi	219,676	254,103	−13.55%
Mala Vyska	Мала Виска	Novoukrainka	9,960	13,132	−24.15%
Novomyrhorod	Новомиргород	Novoukrainka	10,715	13,220	−18.95%
Novoukrainka	Новоукраїнка	Novoukrainka	16,080	19,353	−16.91%
Oleksandriia	Олександрія	Oleksandriia	76,097	93,357	−18.49%
Pomichna	Помічна	Novoukrainka	8,608	10,946	−21.36%
Svitlovodsk	Світловодськ	Oleksandriia	43,130	50,094	−13.90%
Znamianka	Знам'янка	Kropyvnytskyi	21,221	29,412	−27.85%

== See also ==
- List of cities in Ukraine
