= Molodizhne, Kirovohrad Oblast =

Rural locality in Kirovohrad Oblast, Ukraine

Molodizhne Молодіжне
- Rural settlement
- Location in Kirovohrad Oblast Location in Ukraine
- Coordinates: 48°10′21″N 32°39′41″E
- Country: Ukraine
- Oblast: Kirovohrad Oblast
- Raion: Kropyvnytskyi Raion
- Hromada: Dolynska urban hromada

Population (2022)
  - Total: 1,091
- Time zone: UTC+2 (EET)
  - Summer (DST): UTC+3 (EEST)

Molodizhne (Ukrainian: Молодіжне; Russian: Молодёжное) is a rural settlement in Kropyvnytskyi Raion, Kirovohrad Oblast, Ukraine. It is located on the left bank of the Berezivka, a left tributary of the Inhul in the basin of the Southern Bug. Molodizhne belongs to Dolynska urban hromada, one of the hromadas of Ukraine. Population: 1,091 (2022 estimate).

== History ==
Until 18 July 2020, Molodizhne belonged to Dolynska Raion. The raion was abolished in July 2020 as part of the administrative reform of Ukraine, which reduced the number of raions of Kirovohrad Oblast to four. The area of Dolynska Raion was merged into Kropyvnytskyi Raion.

Until 26 January 2024, Molodizhne was designated urban-type settlement. On this day, a new law entered into force which abolished this status, and Molodizhne became a rural settlement.

== Economy ==
=== Transportation ===
The closest railway station is in Dolynska, about 10 kilometres (6.2 mi)southeast of the settlement, with connections to Kryvyi Rih, Mykolaiv, and Znamianka. There is some passenger traffic.

The settlement is connected by road with Dolynska and with Ustynivka, with further connections to Kryvyi Rih, Kropyvnytskyi, Mykolaiv, and Odesa.
