= Dolynsky Raion =

Dolynsky Raion (Ukrainian: Долинський район) may refer to a raion in Ukraine:

- Dolyna Raion, a former raion of Ivano-Frankivsk Oblast,
- Dolynska Raion, a former raion of Kirovohrad Oblast
