= Dolynskyi Raion =

Dolynskyi Raion (Ukrainian: Долинський район) may stand for:

- Dolyna Raion — a former raion (district) of Ivano-Frankivsk Oblast
- Dolynska Raion — a former raion (district) of Kirovohrad Oblast
