= Lisove, Kirovohrad Oblast =

Rural locality in Kirovohrad Oblast, Ukraine

Lisove Лісове
- Rural settlement
- Location in Kirovohrad Oblast Location in Ukraine
- Country: Ukraine
- Oblast: Kirovohrad Oblast
- Raion: Kropyvnytskyi Raion
- Hromada: Oleksandrivka settlement hromada

Population (2022)
  - Total: 1,106
- Time zone: UTC+2 (EET)
  - Summer (DST): UTC+3 (EEST)

Lisove (Ukrainian: Лісове; Russian: Лесовое) is a rural settlement in Kropyvnytskyi Raion in the southeastern part of Kirovohrad Oblast, Ukraine. It belongs to Oleksandrivka settlement hromada, one of the hromadas of Ukraine. Population: 1,106 (2022 estimate).

== History ==
Until 18 July 2020, Lisove belonged to Oleksandrivka Raion. The raion was abolished in July 2020 as part of the administrative reform of Ukraine, which reduced the number of raions of Kirovohrad Oblast to four. The area of Oleksandrivka Raion was merged into Kropyvnytskyi Raion.

Until 26 January 2024, Lisove was designated urban-type settlement. On this day, a new law entered into force which abolished this status, and Lisove became a rural settlement.

== Economy ==
=== Transportation ===
Lisove is connected by a road with Mykhailivka where it has access to roads leading to Kropyvnytskyi, Cherkasy, and Oleksandriia.
