= Haidamatske, Kirovohrad Oblast =

Rural locality in Kirovohrad Oblast, Ukraine

Haidamatske Гайдамацьке
- Rural settlement
- Location in Kirovohrad Oblast Location in Ukraine
- Coordinates: 48°47′53″N 32°24′26″E
- Country: Ukraine
- Oblast: Kirovohrad Oblast
- Raion: Kropyvnytskyi Raion
- Hromada: Oleksandrivka settlement hromada

Population (2022)
  - Total: 1,112
- Time zone: UTC+2 (EET)
  - Summer (DST): UTC+3 (EEST)

Haidamatske (Ukrainian: Гайдамацьке; Russian: Гайдамацкое) is a rural settlement in Kropyvnytskyi Raion of Kirovohrad Oblast in Ukraine. It is located on the right bank of the Inhulets, a right tributary of the Dnieper. Haidamatske belongs to Oleksandrivka settlement hromada, one of the hromadas of Ukraine. Population: 1,112 (2022 estimate).

== History ==
Until 18 July 2020, Yelyzavethradka belonged to Oleksandrivka Raion. The raion was abolished in July 2020 as part of the administrative reform of Ukraine, which reduced the number of raions of Kirovohrad Oblast to four. The area of Oleksandrivka Raion was merged into Kropyvnytskyi Raion.

Until 26 January 2024, Yelyzavethradka was designated urban-type settlement. On this day, a new law entered into force which abolished this status, and Yelyzavethradka became a rural settlement.

On 20 September 2024 the Verkhovna Rada renamed Yelyzavethradka to Haidamatske calling it “decommunization”.

== Economy ==
=== Transportation ===
The closest railway station, about 1 kilometre (0.62 mi) east of the settlement, is Yehradivka. It is located on the railway connecting Smila and Znamianka. There is some passenger traffic.

The settlement has access to Highway H01 connecting Kyiv and Znamianka with further connections to Dnipro, Kryvyi Rih, and Kropyvnytskyi.
