= Ivan Uzlov =

Soviet and Ukrainian metallurgist (1923–2022)

- Born: Ivan Herasymovych Uzlov; 14 August 1923; Olimpiadivka, Petrove Raion, Yekaterinoslav Governorate, Ukrainian SSR, Soviet Union
- Died: 21 February 2022 (aged 98); Dnipro, Ukraine
- Education: Dnipropetrovsk Metallurgical Institute
- Scientific career
- Fields: Metallurgy

Ivan Herasymovych Uzlov (Ukrainian: Іван Герасимович Узлов; 14 August 1923 – 21 February 2022) was a Soviet and Ukrainian scientist and metallurgist. He died in Dnipro on 21 February 2022, at the age of 98.
