= Adzhamka =

Adzhamka Аджамка
- Village
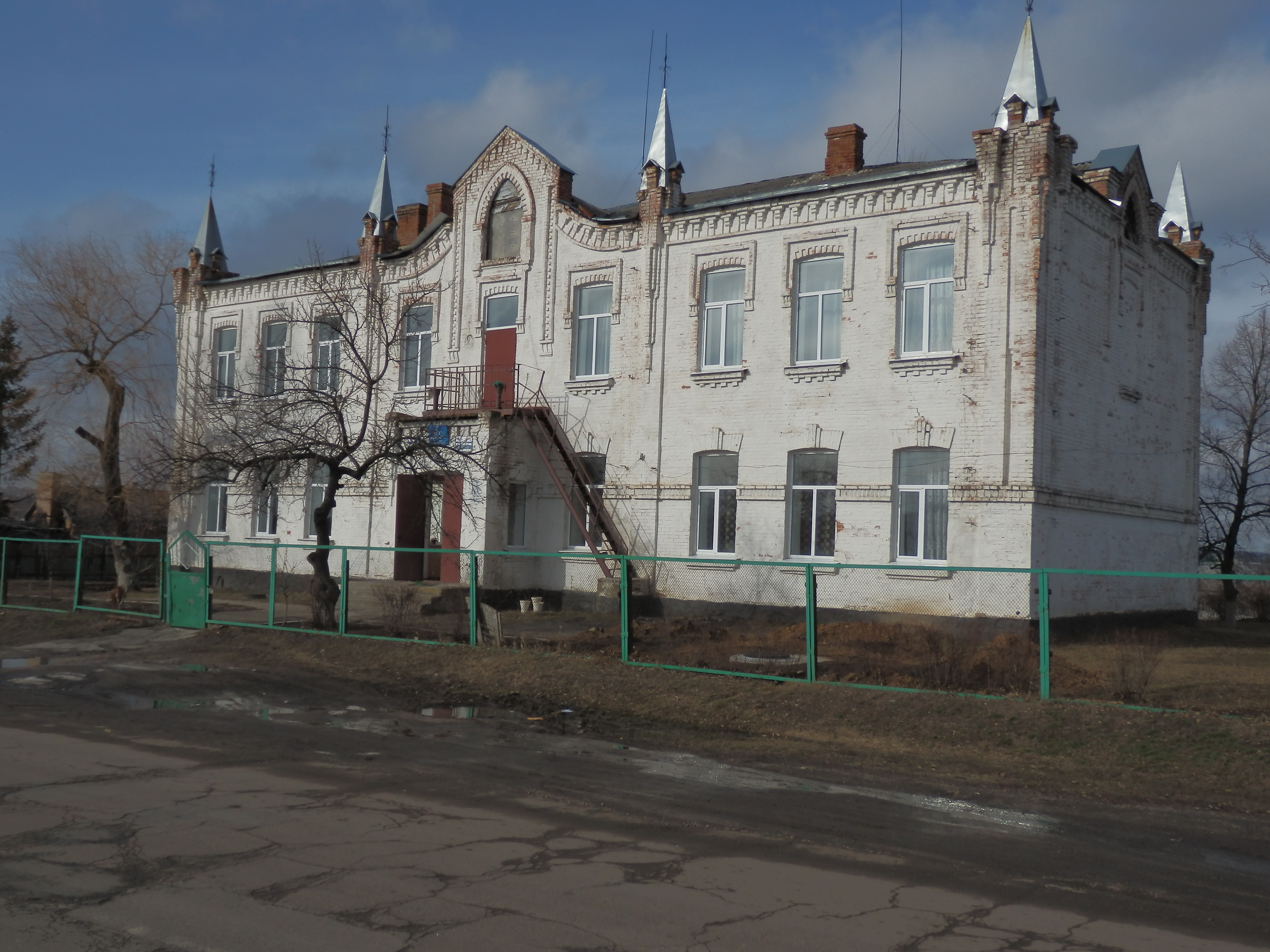
- Kindergarten in Adzhamka

- Flag Coat of arms

- Location in Ukraine Adzhamka (Ukraine Kirovohrad Oblast)
- Coordinates: 48°32′20″N 32°32′05″E
- Country: Ukraine
- Oblast: Kirovohrad Oblast
- District: Kropyvnytskyi Raion
- Hromada: Adzhamka rural hromada
- Founded: 1750s
- Elevation: 112 m (367 ft)

Population (2012)
  - Total: 3,859
- Time zone: UTC+2 (EET)
  - Summer (DST): UTC+3 (EEST)
- Postal code: 27620
- Area code: +380 522
- Climate: Dfa

Adzhamka (Ukrainian: Аджамка) is a village in Kropyvnytskyi Raion, Kirovohrad Oblast of central Ukraine. It serves as the centre of Adzhamka rural hromada, one of the hromadas of Ukraine.

== Geography ==
The village is located in the southeastern section of Right-bank Upland.

== History ==
The settlement was founded by Cossacks in the early 1750s. From 1754 to 1759 and again from 1761 to 1764, the village was part of the Slobid Cossack Regiment. In 1769, the village was burned down by the army of Qırım Giray.

In 1886, 6,508 people lived in the Adzhamka, the center of the Ajam Parish of the Oleksandrii District of the Kherson Governorate, there were 1,142 farm households, there were 2 Orthodox churches, a parish school opened in 1885, 16 benches, an annual fair on 1 October, and bazaars were held daily.

According to data in 1894, Adzhamka had a population of 10,182 (5,165 males and 5,017 females), 1,405 farmsteads, 2 Orthodox churches, 2 parochial and zemstvo schools with 288 students (262 boys and 26 girls), a zemstvo post office, a hospital, a doctor and a paramedic, a steam mill, 5 bread pantries, a forest warehouse, a bulk warehouse for wine and alcohol, 19 benches, 3 drinking establishments, there were 4 fairs a year and bazaars 162 days a year.

Under the Soviet rule Adzhamka served as a district centre of Kirovohrad Oblast.

== Demographics ==
According to the 2020 census, the population of Adzhamka was 3,600 people, including 1,200 pensioners.

Native language as of the Ukrainian Census of 2001:

| Language | Percentage |
|---|---|
| Ukrainian | 95.99% |
| Russian | 3.14% |
| Moldovan (Romanian) | 0.32% |
| Belarusian | 0.12% |
| Hungarian | 0.05% |
| Bulgarian | 0.02% |
| Gagauz | 0.02% |
| Other | 0.34% |

== Gallery ==
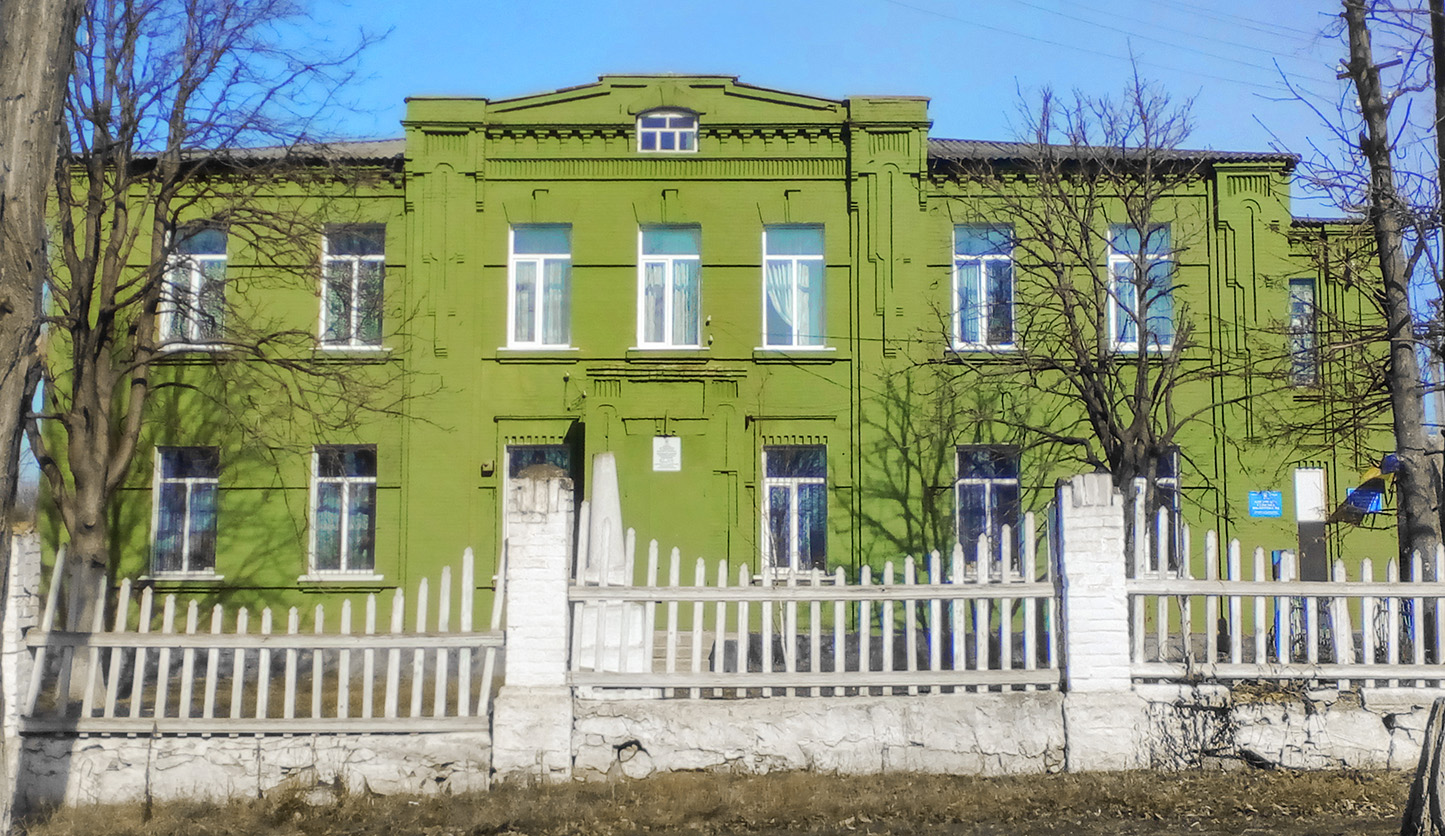
Village council

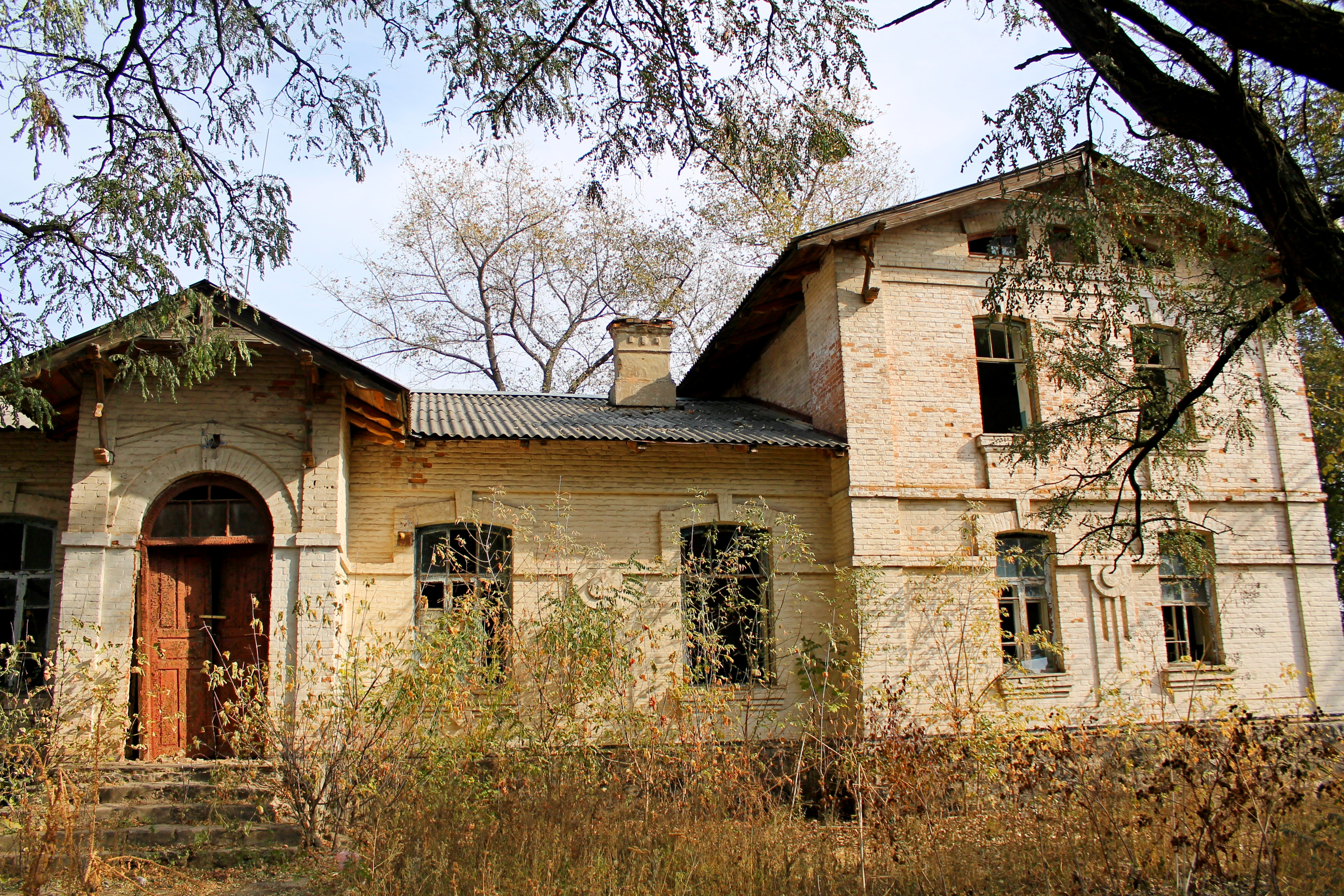
Abandoned school

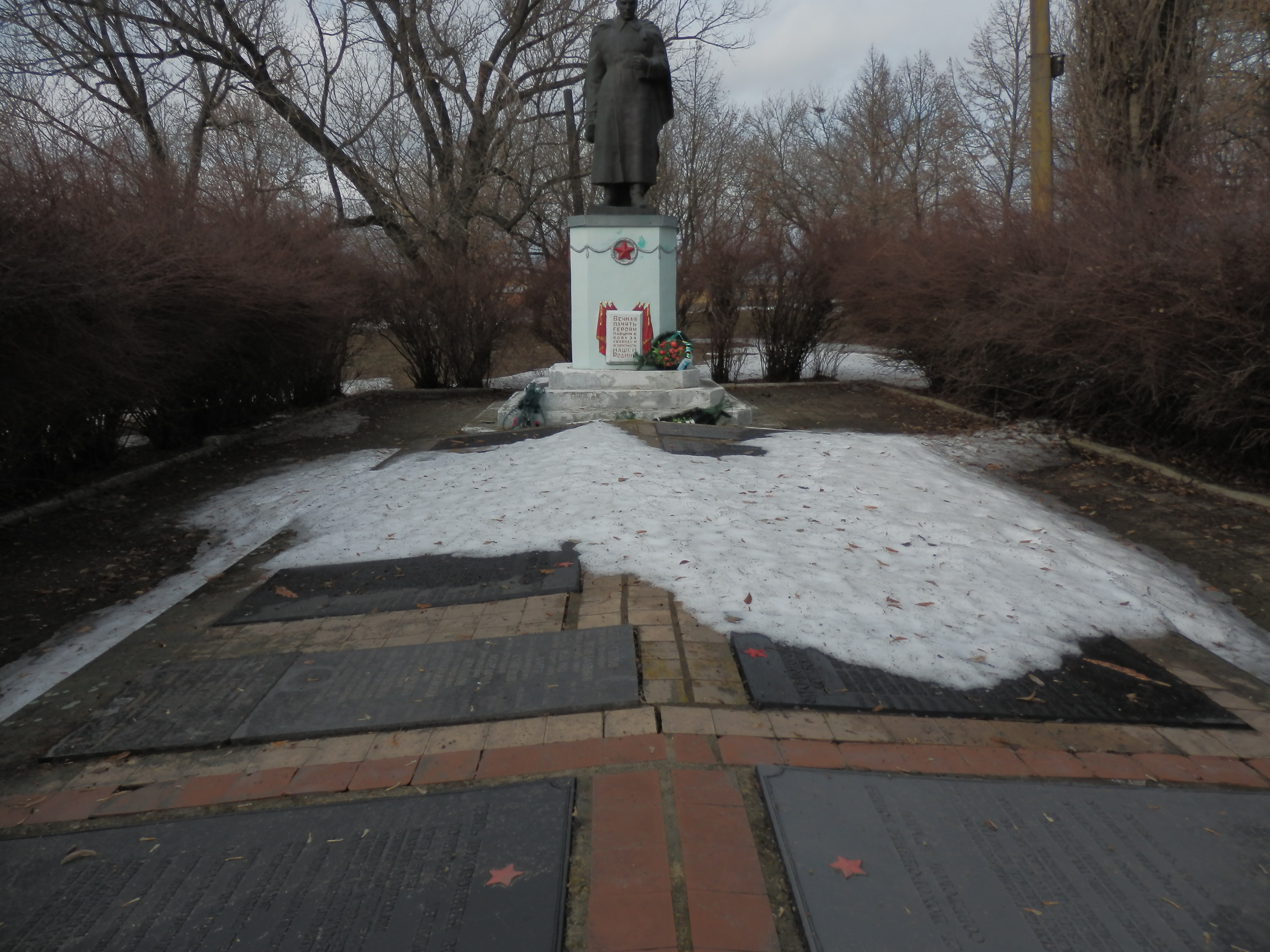
Common grave of Soviet Army soldiers

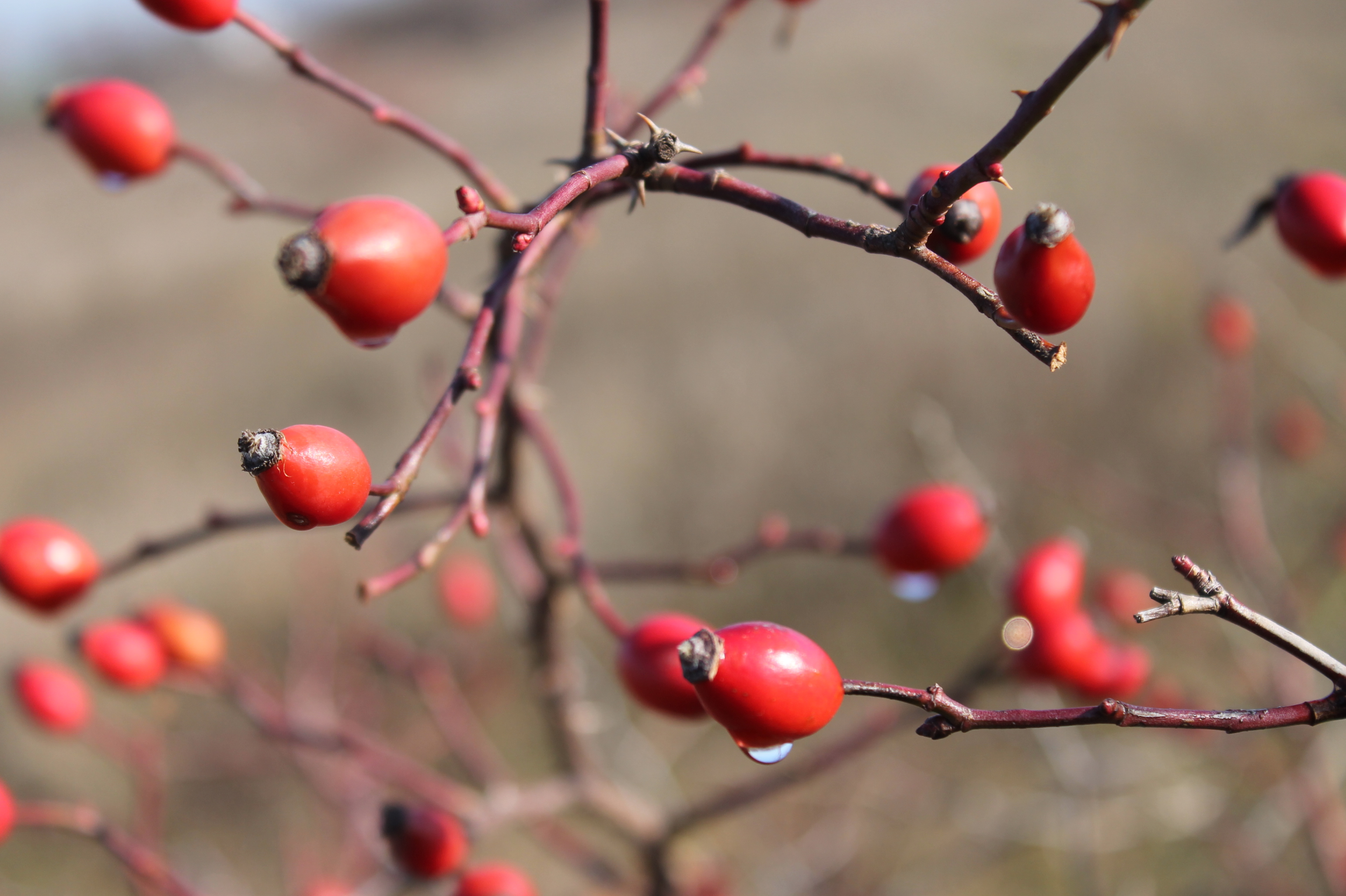
Rosehip in a natural reserve on the outskirts of the village
