= Inhuletske =

Rural locality in Kirovohrad Oblast, Ukraine

Inhuletske Інгулецьке
- Rural settlement
- Location in Kirovohrad Oblast Location in Ukraine
- Coordinates: 48°27′48″N 33°10′49″E
- Country: Ukraine
- Oblast: Kirovohrad Oblast
- Raion: Oleksandriia Raion
- Hromada: Petrove settlement hromada

Population (2022)
  - Total: 725
- Time zone: UTC+2 (EET)
  - Summer (DST): UTC+3 (EEST)

Inhuletske (Ukrainian: Інгулецьке, Russian: Ингулецкое), formerly Balakhivka (Ukrainian: Балахівка; Russian: Балаховка) is a rural settlement in Oleksandriia Raion, Kirovohrad Oblast, Ukraine. It is located on the left bank of the Inhulets, a right tributary of the Dnieper. Inhuletske belongs to Petrove settlement hromada, one of the hromadas of Ukraine. Population: 725 (2022 estimate).

== History ==
Until 18 July 2020, Balakhivka belonged to Petrove Raion. The raion was abolished in July 2020 as part of the administrative reform of Ukraine, which reduced the number of raions of Kirovohrad Oblast to four. The area of Petrove Raion was merged into Oleksandriia Raion.

Until 26 January 2024, Balakhivka was designated urban-type settlement. On this day, a new law entered into force which abolished this status, and Balakhivka became a rural settlement.

On 19 September 2024, the Verkhovna Rada voted to rename Balakhivka to Inhuletske.

== Economy ==
=== Transportation ===
Balakhivka is connected by road with Oleksandriia and Kryvyi Rih, where it has further access to the highway network of Ukraine.
