= Kamianets, Kirovohrad Oblast =

Rural locality in Kirovohrad Oblast, Ukraine

Kamianets Кам'янець
- Rural settlement
- Location in Kirovohrad Oblast Location in Ukraine
- Coordinates: 48°21′41″N 32°39′23″E
- Country: Ukraine
- Oblast: Kirovohrad Oblast
- Raion: Kropyvnytskyi Raion
- Hromada: Novhorodka settlement hromada

Population (2022)
  - Total: 5,425
- Time zone: UTC+2 (EET)
  - Summer (DST): UTC+3 (EEST)

Kamianets (Ukrainian: Кам'янець, Russian: Каменец), formerly Novhorodka (Ukrainian: Новгородка; Russian: Новгородка) is a rural settlement in Kropyvnytskyi Raion, Kirovohrad Oblast, Ukraine. It is located on the Kamianka, a left tributary of the Inhul in the drainage basin of the Southern Bug. Kamianets hosts the administration of Novhorodka settlement hromada, one of the hromadas of Ukraine. Population: 5,525 (2022 estimate).

== History ==
Until 18 July 2020, Novhorodka was the administrative center of Novhorodka Raion. The raion was abolished in July 2020 as part of the administrative reform of Ukraine, which reduced the number of raions of Kirovohrad Oblast to four. The area of Novhorodka Raion was merged into Kropyvnytskyi Raion.

Until 26 January 2024, Novhorodka was designated urban-type settlement. On this day, a new law entered into force which abolished this status, and Novhorodka became a rural settlement.

On 19 September 2024, the Verkhovna Rada voted to rename Novhorodka to Kamianets.

== Economy ==
=== Transportation ===
The settlement is on Highway H23 connecting Kropyvnytskyi and Kryvyi Rih.

The closest railway station is Kutsivka, approximately 10 kilometres (6.2 mi) south-east of Novhorodka, on the railway connecting Znamianka and Dolynska with further connections to Kryvyi Rih and Mykolaiv. There is infrequent passenger traffic.
