= Kompaniivka Raion =

Former subdivision of Kirovohrad Oblast, Ukraine

Kompaniivka Raion Компаніївський район
- Raion
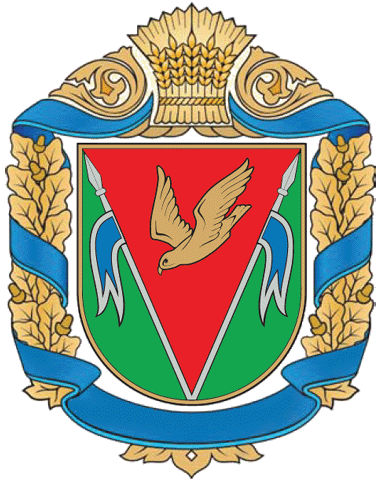
- Flag Coat of arms

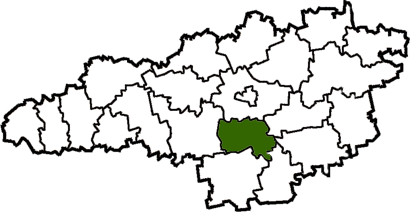
- Coordinates: 48°31′43″N 32°25′22″E
- Country: Ukraine
- Region: Kirovohrad Oblast
- Established: 1965
- Disestablished: 18 July 2020
- Admin. center: Kompaniivka
- Subdivisions: List: 0 — city councils; 1 — settlement councils; 16 — rural councils; Number of localities: 0 — cities; 1 — urban-type settlements; 51 — villages; — rural settlements

Government
  - Governor: Volodymyr Bilobrovenko

Area
  - Total: 967 km^{2} (373 sq mi)

Population (2020)
  - Total: 14,694 ▼
  - Density: 15.2/km^{2} (39.4/sq mi)
- Time zone: UTC+02:00 (EET)
  - Summer (DST): UTC+03:00 (EEST)
- Postal index: 28400—28441
- Area code: +380 5240
- Website: https://web.archive.org/web/20140222100806/http://krda.gov.ua/

Kompaniivka Raion (Ukrainian: Компаніївський район) was a raion (district) of Kirovohrad Oblast in central Ukraine. The raion's administrative center was located in the urban-type settlement of Kompaniivka. The raion was abolished on 18 July 2020 as part of the administrative reform of Ukraine, which reduced the number of raions of Kirovohrad Oblast to four. The area of Kompaniivka Raion was merged into Kropyvnytskyi Raion. The last estimate of the raion population was 14,694 (2020 est.).

At the time of disestablishment, the raion consisted of one hromada, Kompaniivka settlement hromada with the administration in Kompaniivka.
