= Ustynivka Raion =

Former subdivision of Kirovohrad Oblast, Ukraine

Ustynivka Raion Устинівський район
- Raion
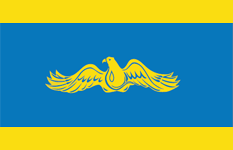
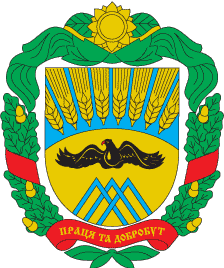
- Flag Coat of arms

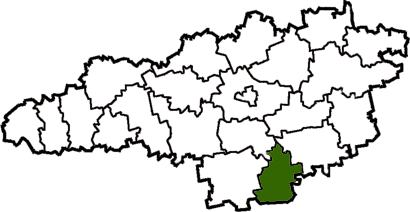
- Coordinates: 47°57′44″N 32°31′9″E
- Country: Ukraine
- Region: Kirovohrad Oblast
- Established: 1939
- Disestablished: 18 July 2020
- Admin. center: Ustynivka
- Subdivisions: List: 0 — city councils; 1 — settlement councils; 14 — rural councils; Number of localities: 0 — cities; 1 — urban-type settlements; 35 — villages; — rural settlements

Government
  - Governor: Anatoliy Abramov

Area
  - Total: 942 km^{2} (364 sq mi)

Population (2020)
  - Total: 12,311 ▼
  - Density: 13.1/km^{2} (33.8/sq mi)
- Time zone: UTC+02:00 (EET)
  - Summer (DST): UTC+03:00 (EEST)
- Postal index: 28600—28632
- Area code: +380 5239
- Website: http://ustin.kr-admin.gov.ua

Ustynivskyi Raion (Ukrainian: Устинівський район) was a raion (district) of Kirovohrad Oblast (province) in central Ukraine. Its administrative center was the urban-type settlement of Ustynivka. The raion was abolished on 18 July 2020 as part of the administrative reform of Ukraine, which reduced the number of raions of Kirovohrad Oblast to four. The area of Ustynivka Raion was merged into Kropyvnytskyi Raion. The last estimate of the raion population was 12,311 (2020 est.).

At the time of disestablishment, the raion consisted of one hromada, Ustynivka settlement hromada with the administration in Ustynivka.
