= Bobrynets Raion =

Former subdivision of Kirovohrad Oblast, Ukraine

Bobrynets Raion Бобринецький район
- Raion
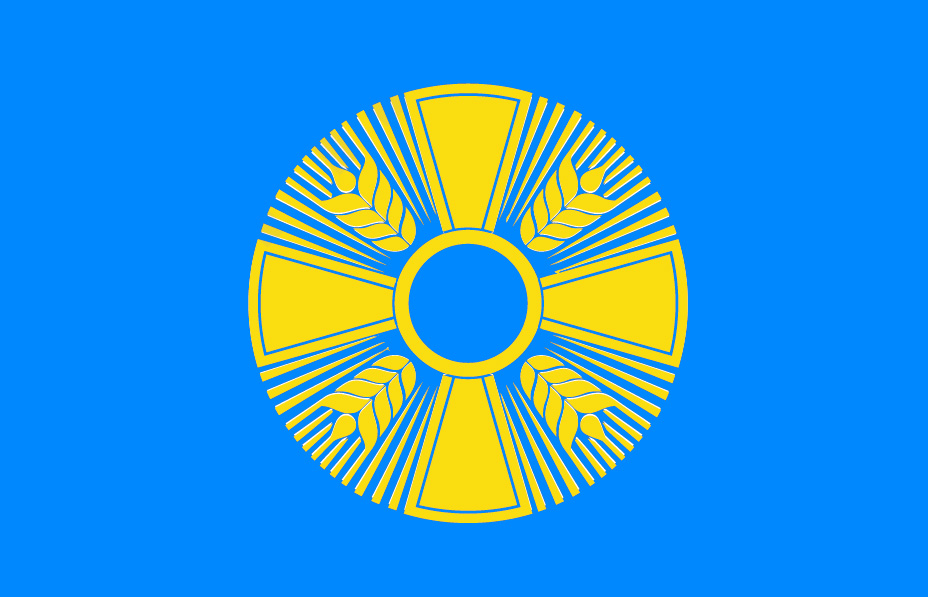
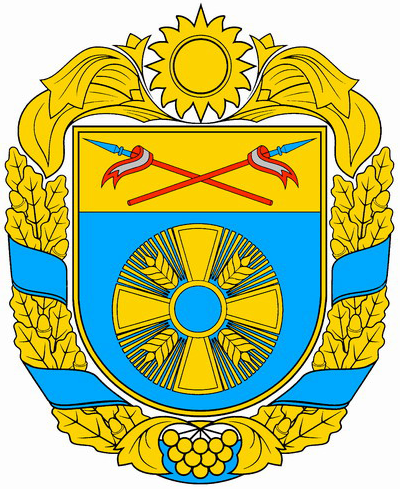
- Flag Coat of arms

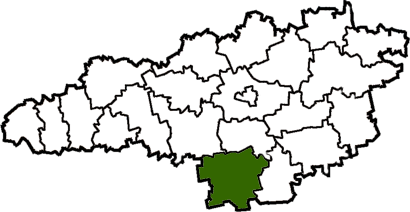
- Coordinates: 47°58′17″N 32°4′34″E
- Country: Ukraine
- Region: Kirovohrad Oblast
- Disestablished: 18 July 2020
- Admin. center: Bobrynets
- Subdivisions: List: — city councils; — settlement councils; — rural councils; Number of localities: — cities; — urban-type settlements; — villages; — rural settlements

Area
  - Total: 1,496 km^{2} (578 sq mi)

Population (2020)
  - Total: 24,702 ▼
  - Density: 16.51/km^{2} (42.77/sq mi)
- Time zone: UTC+02:00 (EET)
  - Summer (DST): UTC+03:00 (EEST)
- Area code: +380

Bobrynetskyi Raion (Ukrainian: Бобринецький район) was a raion (district) of the Kirovohrad Oblast in central Ukraine. It covered an area of 1496 square kilometres. The administrative center of the raion was the city of Bobrynets. The raion was established in 1939. The raion was abolished on 18 July 2020 as part of the administrative reform of Ukraine, which reduced the number of raions of Kirovohrad Oblast to four. The area of Bobrynets Raion was merged into Kropyvnytskyi Raion. The last estimate of the raion population was 24,702 (2020 est.).

At the time of disestablishment, the raion consisted of two hromadas:

- Bobrynets urban hromada with the administration in Bobrynets;
- Ketrysanivka rural hromada with the administration in the selo of Ketrysanivka.
