= Novhorodka Raion =

Former subdivision of Kirovohrad Oblast, Ukraine

Novhorodka Raion Новгородківський район
- Raion
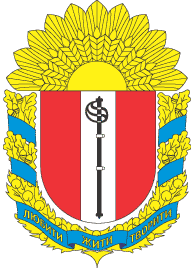
- Flag Coat of arms

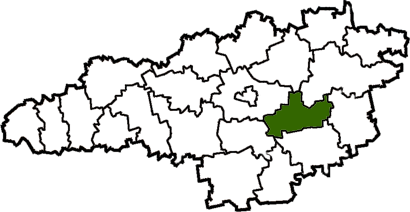
- Coordinates: 48°31′43″N 32°25′22″E
- Country: Ukraine
- Region: Kirovohrad Oblast
- Established: 1923
- Disestablished: 18 July 2020
- Admin. center: Novhorodka
- Subdivisions: List: 0 — city councils; 1 — settlement councils; 10 — rural councils; Number of localities: 0 — cities; 1 — urban-type settlements; 26 — villages; — rural settlements

Government
  - Governor: Oleksandr Zagreba

Area
  - Total: 997 km^{2} (385 sq mi)

Population (2020)
  - Total: 14,831 ▼
  - Density: 14.9/km^{2} (38.5/sq mi)
- Time zone: UTC+02:00 (EET)
  - Summer (DST): UTC+03:00 (EEST)
- Postal index: 28200 — 28228
- Area code: +380 5241
- Website: http://ng.kr-admin.gov.ua

Novhorodka Raion was a raion (district) of Kirovohrad Oblast in central Ukraine. The administrative center of the raion was the urban-type settlement of Novhorodka. The raion was abolished on 18 July 2020 as part of the administrative reform of Ukraine, which reduced the number of raions of Kirovohrad Oblast to four. The area of Novhorodka Raion was merged into Kropyvnytskyi Raion. The last estimate of the raion population was 14,831 (2020 est.).

At the time of disestablishment, the raion consisted of one hromada, Novhorodka settlement hromada with the administration in Novhorodka.
