= Petrove =

Rural locality in Kirovohrad Oblast, Ukraine

Petrove Петрове
- Rural settlement
- Flag Coat of arms

- Location within Ukraine Kirovohrad Oblast Location within Ukraine
- Coordinates: 48°20′33″N 33°16′30″E
- Country: Ukraine
- Oblast: Kirovohrad Oblast
- Raion: Oleksandriia Raion
- Hromada: Petrove settlement hromada

Population (2022)
  - Total: 6,914
- Postal code: 383XX
- Area code: +380 5237

Petrove (Ukrainian: Петрове) or Petrovo (Russian: Петрово) is a rural settlement in Oleksandriia Raion of Kirovohrad Oblast (region) of Ukraine. It hosts the administration of Petrove settlement hromada, one of the hromadas of Ukraine. Population: 6,914 (2022 estimate).

Petrove is situated midway between Kropyvnytskyi and Dnipro cities on the bank of the Inhulets River.

Petrove is a populated place of Petrove Settlement Council, which is a municipal community and beside the town also includes three neighboring villages.

== History ==
It was a village (sloboda) of the Zaporozhian Sich. Later, after the area was annexed by the Russian Empire, Petrove, as a sloboda, was included within the newly formed Kherson Governorate. The settlement was named after one of the officers of the Zaporizhian Host, Peter the Old (Petro Staryi).

In January 1989 the population was 9844 people.

In January 2013, the population was 7530 people.

Until 18 July 2020, Petrove was the administrative center of Petrove Raion. The raion was abolished in July 2020 as part of the administrative reform of Ukraine, which reduced the number of raions of Kirovohrad Oblast to four. The area of Petrove Raion was merged into Oleksandriia Raion.

Until 26 January 2024, Petrove was designated urban-type settlement. On this day, a new law entered into force which abolished this status, and Petrove became a rural settlement.

== See also ==
- FC Inhulets Petrove
