= Kompaniivka =

Rural locality in Kirovohrad Oblast, Ukraine

Kompaniivka Компаніївка
- Rural settlement
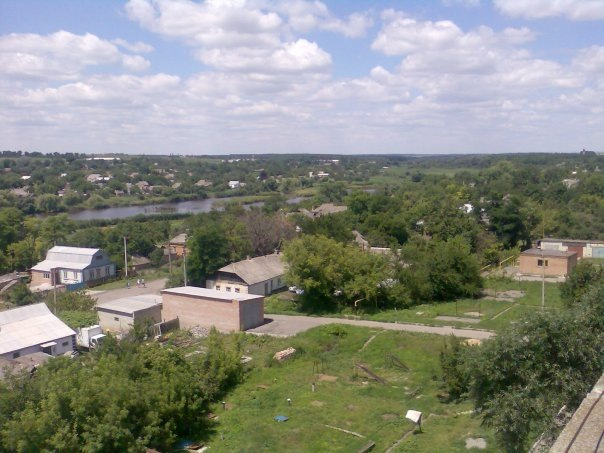
- View of the town

- Location of Kompaniivka in Ukraine
- Coordinates: 48°15′12″N 32°12′19″E
- Country: Ukraine
- Oblast: Kirovohrad Oblast
- Raion: Kropyvnytskyi Raion
- Hromada: Kompaniivka settlement hromada
- Founded: 18th century
- Town status: 1965

Government
  - Town Head: Oleksandr Masliukov
- Elevation: 160 m (520 ft)

Population (2022)
  - Total: 4,323
- Time zone: UTC+2 (EET)
  - Summer (DST): UTC+3 (EEST)
- Postal code: 28402
- Area code: +380 5240
- Website: http://rada.gov.ua/

Kompaniivka (Ukrainian: Компаніївка) is a rural settlement in Kropyvnytskyi Raion, Kirovohrad Oblast, central Ukraine. It hosts the administration of Kompaniivka settlement hromada, one of the hromadas of Ukraine. Population: 4,323 (2022 estimate).

== History ==
Kompaniivka was founded in the second half of 18th century on the left bank of the Suhokleya-Komyshuvata river, a tributary of the Inhul, located on the southern slopes of Dnieper Upland. The settlers were former Cossacks Kompaniiskyi regiments. They had been Hetman light cavalry, whose were guarding the southern and western borders and providing an intelligence service. Probably this happened after the reform of October 24, 1775.

Before the soldiers arrived, there were farmers growing wheat, rye, barley and oats and raising livestock. The lands and the peasants farming them were taken over by the nobility in 1782.

Military reform caused a significant settlement of former Kompaniian. After retirement they were assigned to a particular social status, such as Burghers, peasants or Cossacks.

In the 1850s Kompaniivka became the center of parish of the same name in Elisavetgrad County. In the 1890s the Kompaniivka Paper factory was built in the town; its production was the largest in the region and fourth in Ukraine.

In July 1933, the village became the center of the newly created district of Odesa Oblast. In 1965, Kompaniivka received the status of an urban-type settlement (town).

Until 18 July 2020, Kompaniivka was the administrative center of Kompaniivka Raion. The raion was abolished in July 2020 as part of the administrative reform of Ukraine, which reduced the number of raions of Kirovohrad Oblast to four. The area of Kompaniivka Raion was merged into Kropyvnytskyi Raion.

Until 26 January 2024, Kompaniivka was designated urban-type settlement. On this day, a new law entered into force which abolished this status, and Kompaniivka became a rural settlement.

== Infrastructure ==
=== Economy ===
Most of Kompaniivka Raion's industrial activity took place in Kompaniivka. The settlement's manufacturing plants are:

- Kompaniivka feed mill
- Kompaniivka agrochemistry
- "Kirovohrad", a gas compressor station
- Zhyvanivka granite quarry
- Sausage shop
- Bakery

=== Education ===
- Kompaniivka technical college veterinary medicine Bila Tserkva national agricultural university over the years, has trained about 4 thousand specialists veterinary medicine. For the third consecutive group of students of probation in England, three years technical college holds first place in the organization and conduct of educational practice among students of agricultural schools.
- School of Kompaniivka

=== Medicine ===
The village houses the district's central hospital.

=== Culture ===
Kompaniivka has a children's music school. It 5 departments and 119 pupils study there. The school's nine teachers teach the children to play piano, accordion, wind instruments and guitar, and there are also lessons in choreography and the visual arts. The school has several teams that compete nationally.

The town also has the Museum Raion House of Culture and the raion library with about 26 thousand books (Kirov str. 14-a).

== Sources ==
- Accounting card of town on site of Verkhovna Rada of Ukraine
- Kompaniivka Raion State Administration
- Kompaniivka raion on who-is-who.ua
- Official site Kompaniivka technical college veterinary medicine
