= Novomyrhorod Raion =

Former subdivision of Kirovohrad Oblast, Ukraine

Novomyrhorod Raion Новомиргородський район
- Raion
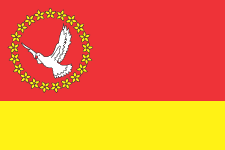
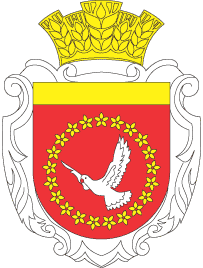
- Flag Coat of arms

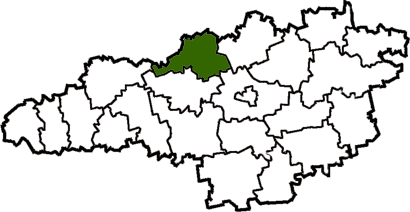
- Coordinates: 48°46′33″N 31°42′53″E
- Country: Ukraine
- Region: Kirovohrad Oblast
- Established: 1923
- Disestablished: 18 July 2020
- Admin. center: Novomyrhorod
- Subdivisions: List: 1 — city councils; 1 — settlement councils; 20 — rural councils; Number of localities: 1 — cities; 1 — urban-type settlements; 48 — villages; — rural settlements

Government
  - Governor: Kovtun Oleksandr

Area
  - Total: 1,032 km^{2} (398 sq mi)

Population (2020)
  - Total: 27,395 ▼
  - Density: 26.55/km^{2} (68.75/sq mi)
- Time zone: UTC+02:00 (EET)
  - Summer (DST): UTC+03:00 (EEST)
- Postal index: 26000—26043
- Area code: +380 5256
- Website: http://nmrda.kr-admin.gov.ua/

Novomyrhorod Raion was a raion (district) of Kirovohrad Oblast in central Ukraine. Its administrative center was the city of Novomyrhorod. The raion was abolished on 18 July 2020 as part of the administrative reform of Ukraine, which reduced the number of raions of Kirovohrad Oblast to four. The area of Novomyrhorod Raion was merged into Novoukrainka Raion. The last estimate of the raion population was 27,395 (2020 est.).

At the time of disestablishment, the raion consisted of one hromada, Novomyrhorod urban hromada with the administration in Novomyrhorod.
