= Oleksandrivka, Oleksandrivka settlement hromada, Kropyvnytskyi Raion, Kirovohrad Oblast =

Rural locality in Kirovohrad Oblast, Ukraine

Oleksandrivka Олександрівка
- Rural settlement
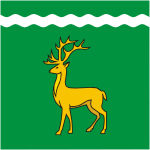
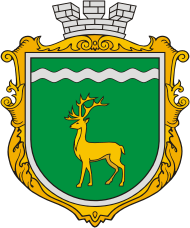
- Flag Coat of arms

- Location in Kirovohrad Oblast Location in Ukraine
- Coordinates: 48°57′56″N 32°14′02″E
- Country: Ukraine
- Oblast: Kirovohrad Oblast
- Raion: Kropyvnytskyi Raion
- Hromada: Oleksandrivka settlement hromada

Population (2022)
  - Total: 8,012
- Time zone: UTC+2 (EET)
  - Summer (DST): UTC+3 (EEST)

Oleksandrivka (Ukrainian: Олександрівка) is a rural settlement in Kropyvnytskyi Raion of Kirovohrad Oblast in Ukraine. It is located on the Tiasmyn, a right tributary of the Dnieper. Oleksandrivka hosts the administration of Oleksandrivka settlement hromada, one of the hromadas of Ukraine. As of 2022, it had an estimated population of 8,012 (2022 estimate)

== History ==
The settlement and the surrounding district contain a major forest area known as Chornyi Lis (Ukrainian: Чорний Ліс, "Black Forest"). The location historically served as a major base of the haidamak movement. During the Ukrainian War of Independence a self-proclaimed republic was organized by local Ukrainian insurgents.

Until 18 July 2020, Oleksandrivka was the administrative center of Oleksandrivka Raion. The raion was abolished in July 2020 as part of the administrative reform of Ukraine, which reduced the number of raions of Kirovohrad Oblast to four. The area of Oleksandrivka Raion was merged into Kropyvnytskyi Raion.

Until 26 January 2024, Oleksandrivka was designated urban-type settlement. On this day, a new law entered into force which abolished this status, and Oleksandrivka became a rural settlement.

== Economy ==
=== Transportation ===
The settlement is the branching point of Highway H01 connecting Kyiv and Znamianka, and Highway H14 which runs via Kropyvnytskyi to Mykolaiv.

Fundukliivka railway station, located in Oleksandrivka, is on the railway connecting Kyiv and Znamianka with further access to Kropyvnytskyi, Kremenchuk, and Mykolaiv. There is passenger traffic, both local and long-distance.
