= Blahovishchenske Raion =

Former subdivision of Kirovohrad Oblast, Ukraine

Blahovishchenske Raion Благовіщенський район
- Raion
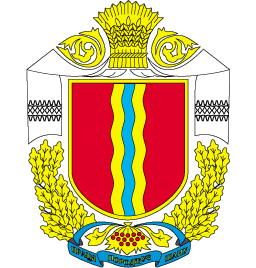
- Flag Coat of arms

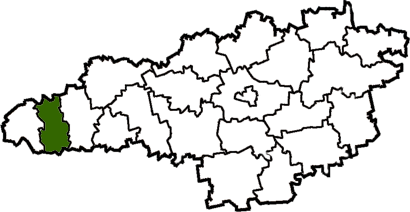
- Coordinates: 48°18′44″N 30°14′45″E
- Country: Ukraine
- Region: Kirovohrad Oblast
- Established: 1923
- Disestablished: 18 July 2020
- Admin. center: Blahovishchenske
- Subdivisions: List: 1 — city councils; 0 — settlement councils; 17 — rural councils; Number of localities: 1 — cities; 0 — urban-type settlements; 26 — villages; — rural settlements

Government
  - Governor: Myhaylo Toryanyk

Area
  - Total: 701 km^{2} (271 sq mi)

Population (2020)
  - Total: 21,802 ▼
  - Density: 31.1/km^{2} (80.6/sq mi)
- Time zone: UTC+02:00 (EET)
  - Summer (DST): UTC+03:00 (EEST)
- Postal index: 26400—26452
- Area code: +380 5259
- Website: http://ulrayrada.com.ua

Blahovishchenske Raion (Ukrainian: Благовіщенський район), formerly Ulianovka Raion (Ульяновський район), was a raion (district) of Kirovohrad Oblast in central Ukraine. The administrative center of the raion was the city of Blahovishchenske. The raion was abolished on 18 July 2020 as part of the administrative reform of Ukraine, which reduced the number of raions of Kirovohrad Oblast to four. The area of Blahovishchenske Raion was merged into Holovanivsk Raion. The last estimate of the raion population was 21,802 (2020 est.).

At the time of disestablishment, the raion consisted of one hromada, Blahovishchenske urban hromada with the administration in Blahovishchenske.
