= Znamianka Raion =

Former subdivision of Kirovohrad Oblast, Ukraine

Znamianka Raion Знам'янський район
- Raion
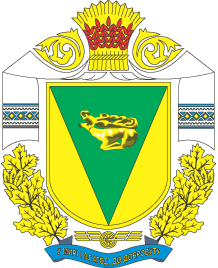
- Flag Coat of arms

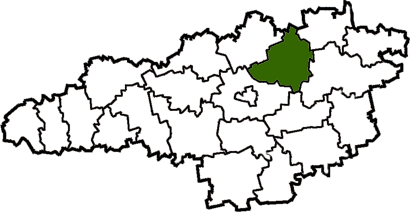
- Coordinates: 48°44′51″N 32°37′35″E
- Country: Ukraine
- Region: Kirovohrad Oblast
- Established: 1923
- Disestablished: 18 July 2020
- Admin. center: Znamianka
- Subdivisions: List: 0 — city councils; 0 — settlement councils; 13 — rural councils; Number of localities: 0 — cities; 0 — urban-type settlements; 45 — villages; — rural settlements

Government
  - Governor: Vasyl Dzyaduh

Area
  - Total: 1,334 km^{2} (515 sq mi)

Population (2020)
  - Total: 21,755 ▼
  - Density: 16.31/km^{2} (42.24/sq mi)
- Time zone: UTC+02:00 (EET)
  - Summer (DST): UTC+03:00 (EEST)
- Postal index: 27400 — 27454
- Area code: +380 5233
- Website: http://zn.kr-admin.gov.ua/

Znamianskyi Raion was a raion (district) of Kirovohrad Oblast in central Ukraine. The administrative center of the raion was the city of Znamianka, which was incorporated separately as a city of oblast significance and did not belong to the raion. The raion was abolished on 18 July 2020 as part of the administrative reform of Ukraine, which reduced the number of raions of Kirovohrad Oblast to four. The area of Znamianka Raion was merged into Kropyvnytskyi Raion. The last estimate of the raion population was 21,755 (2020 est.).

At the time of disestablishment, the raion consisted of two hromadas:

- Dmytrivka rural hromada with the administration in the selo of Dmytrivka;
- Subottsi rural hromada with the administration in the selo of Subottsi.
