= Ustynivka =

Rural locality in Kirovohrad Oblast, Ukraine

Ustynivka Устинівка
- Rural settlement
- Location in Kirovohrad Oblast Location in Ukraine
- Coordinates: 47°57′13″N 32°32′09″E
- Country: Ukraine
- Oblast: Kirovohrad Oblast
- Raion: Kropyvnytskyi Raion
- Hromada: Ustynivka settlement hromada

Population (2022)
  - Total: 3,233
- Time zone: UTC+2 (EET)
  - Summer (DST): UTC+3 (EEST)

Ustynivka (Ukrainian: Устинівка, Russian: Устиновка) is a rural settlement in Kropyvnytskyi Raion of Kirovohrad Oblast in Ukraine. It is located on the Berezivka, a left tributary of the Inhul in the drainage basin of the Southern Bug. Ustynivka hosts the administration of Ustynivka settlement hromada, one of the hromadas of Ukraine. Population: 3,077 (2025 estimate); 3,233 (2022 estimate).

== History ==
Until 18 July 2020, Ustynivka was the administrative center of Ustynivka Raion. The raion was abolished in July 2020 as part of the administrative reform of Ukraine, which reduced the number of raions of Kirovohrad Oblast to four. The area of Ustynivka Raion was merged into Kropyvnytskyi Raion.

Until 26 January 2024, Ustynivka was designated urban-type settlement. On this day, a new law entered into force which abolished this status, and Ustynivka became a rural settlement.

== Economy ==
=== Transportation ===
The settlement has access to Highway H11 connecting Kryvyi Rih and Odesa, as well as to Highway H14 connecting Kropyvnytskyi and Mykolaiv.
