= Blahovishchenske =

City in Kirovohrad Oblast, Ukraine

Blahovishchenske Благовіщенське
- City
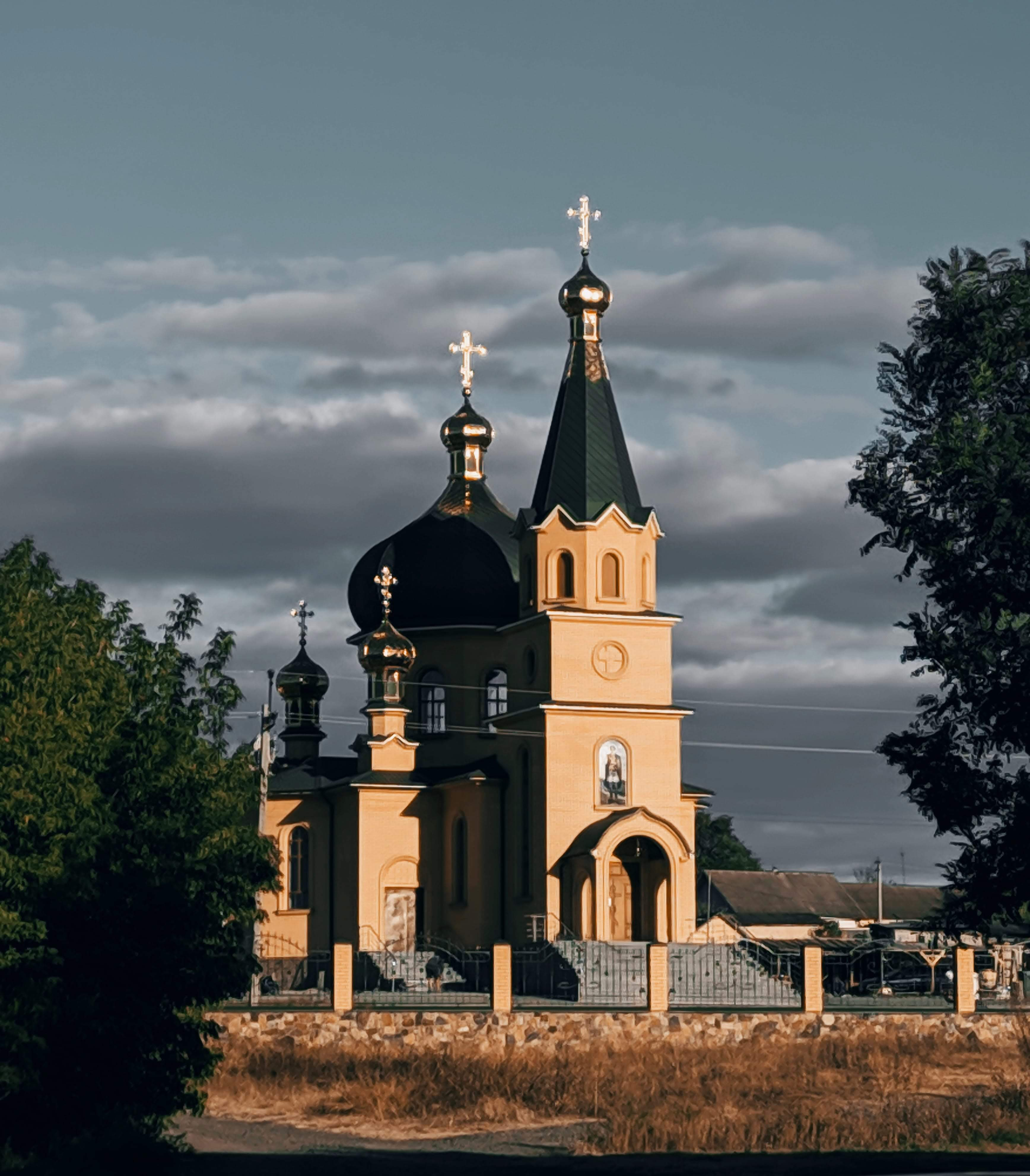
- Church

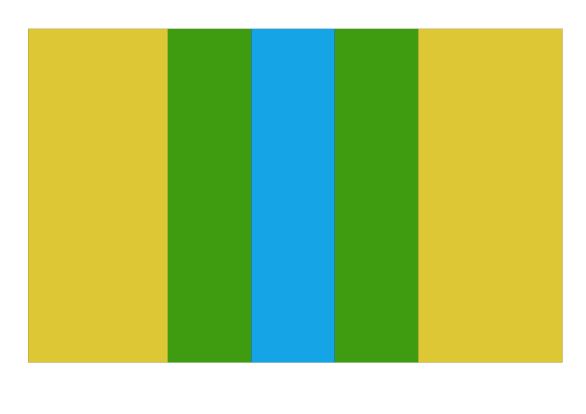
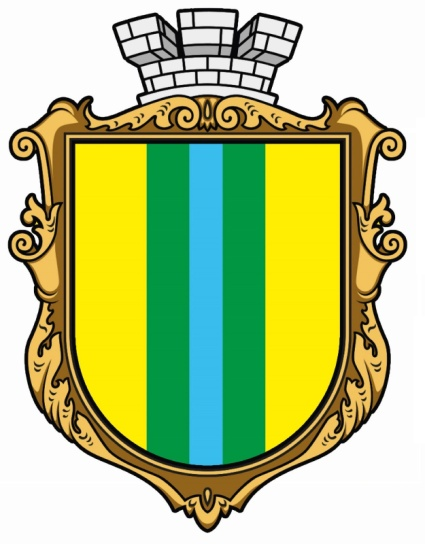
- Flag Coat of arms
- Interactive map of Blahovishchenske
- Location in Ukraine Blahovishchenske (Ukraine Kirovohrad Oblast)
- Coordinates: 48°19′10″N 30°14′7″E
- Country: Ukraine
- Oblast: Kirovohrad Oblast
- Raion: Holovanivsk Raion
- Hromada: Blahovishchenske urban hromada

Population (2022)
  - Total: 5,825

Blahovishchenske (Ukrainian: Благовіщенське [blɐɦoˈwiʃtʃenʲsʲke]) is a small city in Holovanivsk Raion, Kirovohrad Oblast, Ukraine. It hosts the administration of Blahovishchenske urban hromada, one of the hromadas of Ukraine. Population: 5,073 (2025 estimate); 5,825 (2022 estimate).

There is a railway station in Blahovishchenske.

== History ==
It was a settlement in Podolian Governorate of Russian Empire.

A local newspaper is published here since 1935.

City since 1974.

The population as of 1989 was 10648 people.

On 19 May 2016, Verkhovna Rada adopted decision to rename Ulianovka as Blahovishchenske and conform to the law prohibiting names of Communist origin.

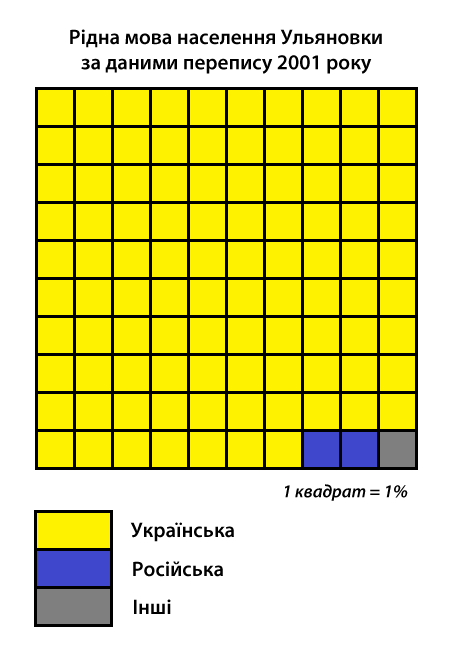
Native language of Ulianovka residents according to 2001 census

Until 18 July 2020, Blahovishchenske was the administrative center of Blahovishchenske Raion. The raion was abolished in July 2020 as part of the administrative reform of Ukraine, which reduced the number of raions of Kirovohrad Oblast to four. The area of Blahovishchenske Raion was merged into Holovanivsk Raion.

== Former names ==
- 1924–2016 – Ulianovka (Ukrainian: Ульяновка).
- since 2016 – Blahovishchenske.
