= Oleksandrivka Raion, Kirovohrad Oblast =

Former subdivision of Kirovohrad Oblast, Ukraine

Oleksandrivka Raion Олександрівський район
- Raion
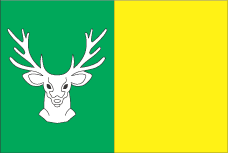
- Flag Coat of arms

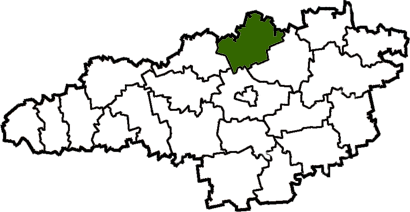
- Coordinates: 48°52′51″N 32°15′30″E
- Country: Ukraine
- Region: Kirovohrad Oblast
- Established: 1923
- Disestablished: 18 July 2020
- Admin. center: Oleksandrivka
- Subdivisions: List: 0 — city councils; 3 — settlement councils; 20 — rural councils; Number of localities: 0 — cities; 3 — urban-type settlements; 50 — villages; — rural settlements

Government
  - Governor: Valeriy Aksentyev

Area
  - Total: 1,159 km^{2} (447 sq mi)

Population (2020)
  - Total: 25,800 ▼
  - Density: 22.3/km^{2} (57.7/sq mi)
- Time zone: UTC+02:00 (EET)
  - Summer (DST): UTC+03:00 (EEST)
- Postal index: 27300—27345
- Area code: +380 5242
- Website: http://olexrda.at.ua/

Oleksandrivka Raion was a raion (district) of Kirovohrad Oblast in central Ukraine. The administrative center of the raion was the urban-type settlement of Oleksandrivka. The raion was abolished on 18 July 2020, as part of the administrative reform of Ukraine. The reform reduced the number of raions of Kirovohrad Oblast to four. The area of Oleksandrivka Raion was merged into Kropyvnytskyi Raion. The last estimate of the raion population was 25,800 (2020 est.).

At the time of disestablishment, the raion consisted of one hromada, Oleksandrivka settlement hromada with the administration in Oleksandrivka.
