= Petrove Raion =

Former subdivision of Kirovohrad Oblast, Ukraine

Petrove Raion Петрівський район
- Raion
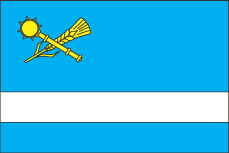
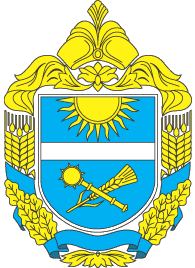
- Flag Coat of arms

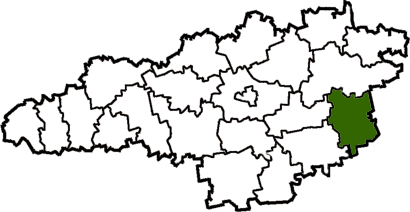
- Coordinates: 48°23′N 33°14′E
- Country: Ukraine
- Region: Kirovohrad Oblast
- Established: 1923
- Disestablished: 18 July 2020
- Admin. center: Petrove
- Subdivisions: List: 0 — city councils; 2 — settlement councils; — rural councils; Number of localities: 0 — cities; 2 — urban-type settlements; — villages; — rural settlements

Area
  - Total: 1,195 km^{2} (461 sq mi)

Population (2020)
  - Total: 22,946 ▼
  - Density: 19.20/km^{2} (49.73/sq mi)
- Time zone: UTC+02:00 (EET)
  - Summer (DST): UTC+03:00 (EEST)
- Area code: +380

Petrove Raion (Ukrainian: Петрівський район) was a raion (district) of Kirovohrad Oblast in central Ukraine. It covered an area of 1195 square kilometres, and its administrative center lied at Petrove. The raion was established on March 7, 1923, it existed until its abolition on 18 July 2020 as part of administrative reform of Ukraine which reduced the number of raions of Kirovohrad Oblast to four. The area of Petrove Raion was merged into Oleksandriia Raion. The last estimate of the raion population was 22,946 (2020 est.).

The raion was subdivided into 15 communities known as councils (rada): 2 town councils and 13 village councils.

At the time of disestablishment, the raion consisted of one hromada, Petrove settlement hromada with the administration in Petrove.
