= Dolynska Raion =

Former subdivision of Kirovohrad Oblast, Ukraine

Dolynska Raion Долинський район
- Raion
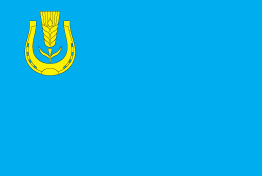
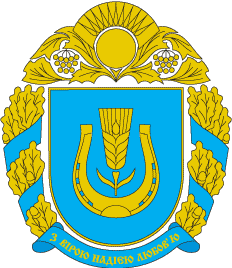
- Flag Coat of arms

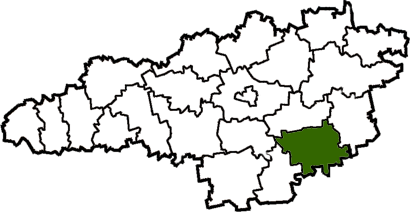
- Coordinates: 48°9′48″N 32°52′59″E
- Country: Ukraine
- Region: Kirovohrad Oblast
- Established: 1923
- Disestablished: 18 July 2020
- Admin. center: Dolynska
- Subdivisions: List: 1 — city councils; 1 — settlement councils; 17 — rural councils; Number of localities: 1 — cities; 1 — urban-type settlements; 46 — villages; — rural settlements

Government
  - Governor: Genadiy Vitryak

Area
  - Total: 1,200 km^{2} (460 sq mi)

Population (2020)
  - Total: 32,610 ▼
  - Density: 27/km^{2} (70/sq mi)
- Time zone: UTC+02:00 (EET)
  - Summer (DST): UTC+03:00 (EEST)
- Postal index: 28500—28545
- Area code: +380 5234
- Website: https://web.archive.org/web/20140221171041/http://dolinskayarda.com.ua/

Dolynska Raion was a raion (district) of Kirovohrad Oblast in central Ukraine. The administrative center of the raion was the city of Dolynska. The raion was abolished on 18 July 2020 as part of the administrative reform of Ukraine, which reduced the number of raions of Kirovohrad Oblast to four. The area of Dolynska Raion was merged into Kropyvnytskyi Raion. The last estimate of the raion population was 32,610 (2020 est.).

At the time of disestablishment, the raion consisted of two hromadas:

- Dolynska urban hromada with the administration in Dolynska;
- Hurivka rural hromada with the administration in the selo of Hurivka.
