= Dolynska =

City in Kirovohrad Oblast, Ukraine

Dolynska Долинська
- City
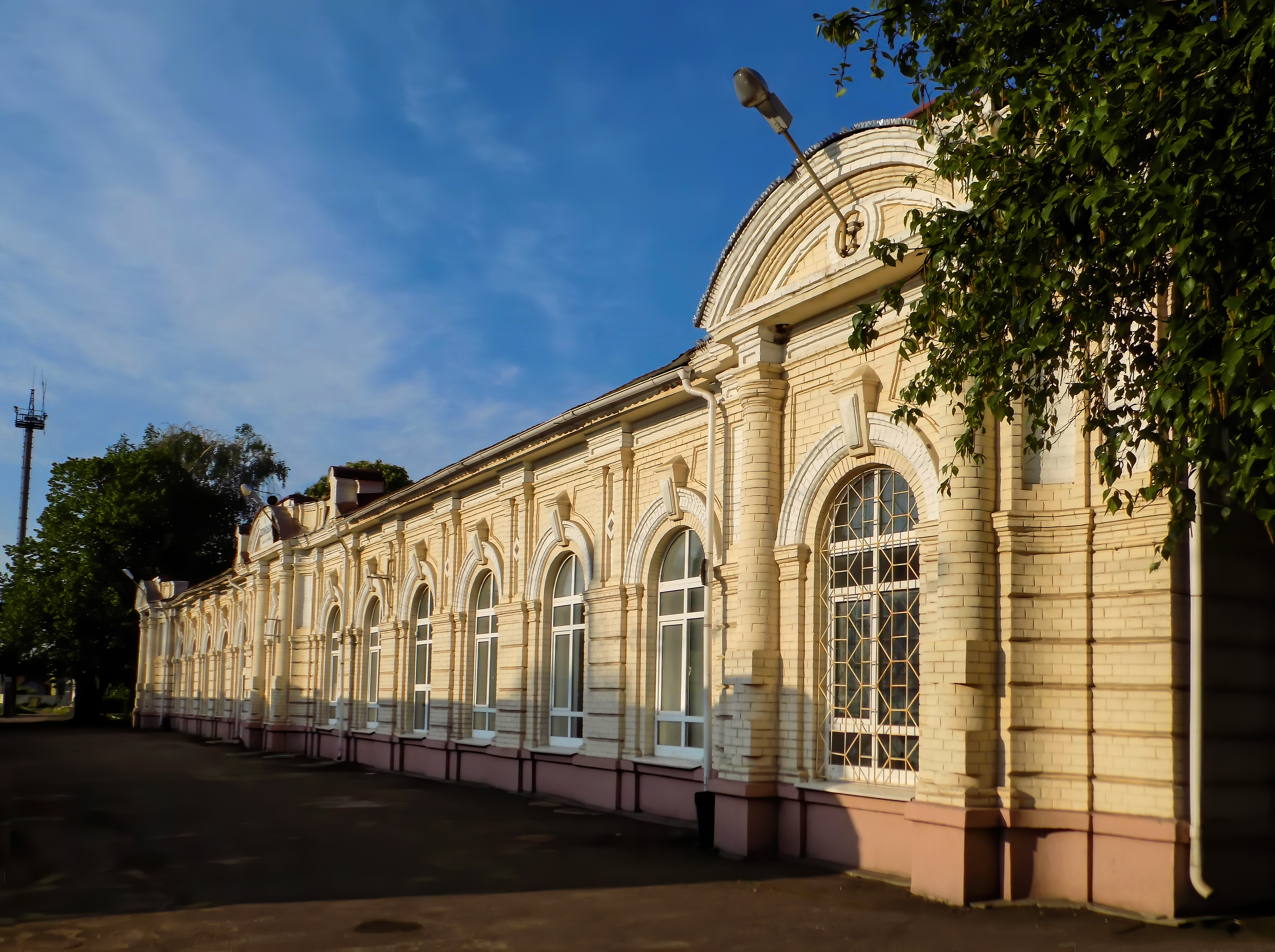
- Dolynska railway station

- Flag Coat of arms
- Interactive map of Dolynska
- Location within Ukraine Location within Ukraine Kirovohrad Oblast
- Coordinates: 48°6′40″N 32°45′53″E
- Country: Ukraine
- Oblast: Kirovohrad Oblast
- Raion: Kropyvnytskyi Raion
- Metropolitan area: Kryvyi Rih metropolitan area
- Hromada: Dolynska urban hromada

Area
  - Total: 12.13 km^{2} (4.68 sq mi)

Population (2022)
  - Total: 18,225
  - Density: 1,502/km^{2} (3,891/sq mi)

Dolynska (Ukrainian: Долинська, IPA: [doˈlɪnʲsʲkɐ]) is a city in Kropyvnytskyi Raion, Kirovohrad Oblast, Ukraine. It is located within the Kryvyi Rih metropolitan area. It hosts the administration of Dolynska urban hromada, one of the hromadas of Ukraine. Population: 18,225 (2022 estimate). It covers an area of 12.13 square kilometres (4.68 mi^{2}).

Dolynska is located in the southeastern part of Kirovohrad Oblast. It serves as an important railway junction.

== History ==
During the Ukrainian War of Independence, from 1917 to 1920, it passed between various factions. Afterwards it was administratively part of the Katerynoslav Governorate of Ukraine.

Until 18 July 2020, Dolynska was the administrative center of Dolynska Raion. The raion was abolished in July 2020 as part of the administrative reform of Ukraine, which reduced the number of raions in Kirovohrad Oblast to four. The area of Dolynska Raion was merged into Kropyvnytskyi Raion.
