= Kropyvnytskyi Raion =

Subdivision of Kirovohrad Oblast, Ukraine

Kropyvnytskyi Raion Кропивницький район
- Raion
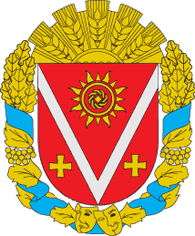
- Flag Coat of arms

- Coordinates: 48°31′43″N 32°25′22″E
- Country: Ukraine
- Oblast: Kirovohrad Oblast
- Established: 1923
- Admin. center: Kropyvnytskyi
- Subdivisions: 17 hromadas

Government
  - Governor: Andriy Malytskiy

Area
  - Total: 9,723.2 km^{2} (3,754.1 sq mi)

Population (2022)
  - Total: 429,585
  - Density: 44.181/km^{2} (114.43/sq mi)
- Time zone: UTC+02:00 (EET)
  - Summer (DST): UTC+03:00 (EEST)
- Postal index: 27601—27657
- Area code: +380 522
- Website: http://kirrda.kr-admin.gov.ua

Kropyvnytskyi Raion is a raion (district) of Kirovohrad Oblast in central Ukraine. Its administrative center is the city of Kropyvnytskyi (until July 2016 Kirovohrad). Population: 429,585 (2022 estimate).

On 18 July 2020, as part of the administrative reform of Ukraine, the number of raions of Kirovohrad Oblast was reduced to four, and the area of Kropyvnytskyi Raion was significantly expanded. Seven abolished raions, Bobrynets, Dolynska, Kompaniivka, Novhorodka, Oleksandrivka, Ustynivka, and Znamianka Raions, as well as Kropyvnytskyi and Znamianka Municipalities, were merged into Kropyvnytskyi Raion. The January 2020 estimate of the raion population was 36,353 (2020 est.).

The district was known as Kirovohrad Raion until November 2018, when it was renamed in accordance with the decommunisation law.

== Subdivisions ==
=== Current ===
After the reform in July 2020, the raion consisted of 17 hromadas:

- Adzhamka rural hromada with the administration in the selo of Adzhamka, retained from Kropyvnytskyi Raion;
- Bobrynets urban hromada with the administration in the city of Bobrynets, transferred from Bobrynets Raion;
- Dmytrivka rural hromada with the administration in the selo of Dmytrivka, transferred from Znamianka Raion;
- Dolynska urban hromada with the administration in the city of Dolynska, transferred from Dolynska Raion;
- Hurivka rural hromada with the administration in the selo of Hurivka, transferred from Dolynska Raion;
- Katerynivka rural hromada with the administration in the village of Katerynivka, retained from Kropyvnytskyi Raion;
- Ketrysanivka rural hromada with the administration in the selo of Ketrysanivka, transferred from Bobrynets Raion;
- Kompaniivka settlement hromada with the administration in the rural settlement of Kompaniivka, transferred from Kompaniivka Raion;
- Kropyvnytskyi urban hromada with the administration in the city of Kropyvnytskyi, transferred from the city of oblast significance of Kropyvnytskyi;
- Novhorodka settlement hromada with the administration in the rural settlement of Kamianets, transferred from Novhorodka Raion;
- Oleksandrivka settlement hromada with the administration in the rural settlement of Oleksandrivka, transferred from Oleksandrivka Raion;
- Pervozvanivka rural hromada with the administration in the selo of Pervozvanivka, retained from Kropyvnytskyi Raion;
- Sokolivske rural hromada with the administration in the selo of Sokolivske, retained from Kropyvnytskyi Raion;
- Subottsi rural hromada with the administration in the selo of Subottsi, transferred from Znamianka Raion;
- Ustynivka settlement hromada with the administration in the rural settlement of Ustynivka, transferred from Ustynivka Raion;
- Velyka Severynka rural hromada with the administration in the selo of Velyka Severynka, retained from Kropyvnytskyi Raion;
- Znamianka urban hromada with the administration in the city of Znamianka, transferred from Znamianka Municipality.

=== Before 2020 ===
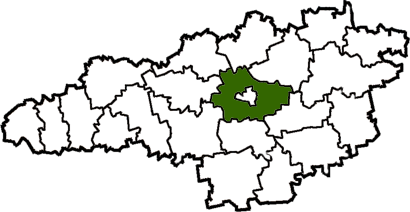
Kropyvnytskyi Raion in Kirovohrad Oblast before 2020

Before the 2020 reform, the raion consisted of five hromadas:

- Adzhamka rural hromada with the administration in Adzhamka;
- Katerynivka rural hromada with the administration in Katerynivka;
- Pervozvanivka rural hromada with the administration in Pervozvanivka;
- Sokolivske rural hromada with the administration in Sokolivske;
- Velyka Severynka rural hromada with the administration in Velyka Severynka.
