= Subottsi rural hromada =

Subottsi rural hromada Суботцівська сільська громада
- Hromada
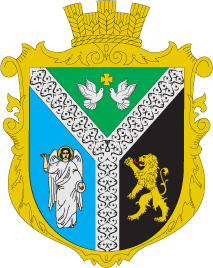
- Seal
- Interactive map of Subottsi rural hromada
- Country: Ukraine
- Oblast: Kirovohrad Oblast
- Raion: Kropyvnytskyi Raion

Area
  - Total: 532.6 km^{2} (205.6 sq mi)

Population
  - Total: 11,832
  - Density: 22.22/km^{2} (57.54/sq mi)
- Settlements: 23
- Villages: 23
- Website: https://subrada.gov.ua/

Subottsi rural hromada is a hromada of Ukraine, located in Kropyvnytskyi Raion, Kirovohrad Oblast. Its administrative center is the village Subottsi.

It has an area of 532.6 square kilometres (205.6 mi^{2}), and a population of 11,832 people.

The hromada contains 23 villages: Subottsi, Bohdanivka, Kostyantynivka, Trepivka, Barvinivka, Vasyne, Volodymyrivka, Hlyboka Balka, Dilyno-Kamianka, Kopani, Kokhanivka, Kucherivka, Milova Balka, Moshoryne, Novovodyane, Novopolyana, Novoromanivka, Novotrepivka, Sablyne, Spaso-Mozharivka, and Topylo.
