= Subottsi =

Village in Kirovohrad Oblast, Ukraine

Subottsi Суботці
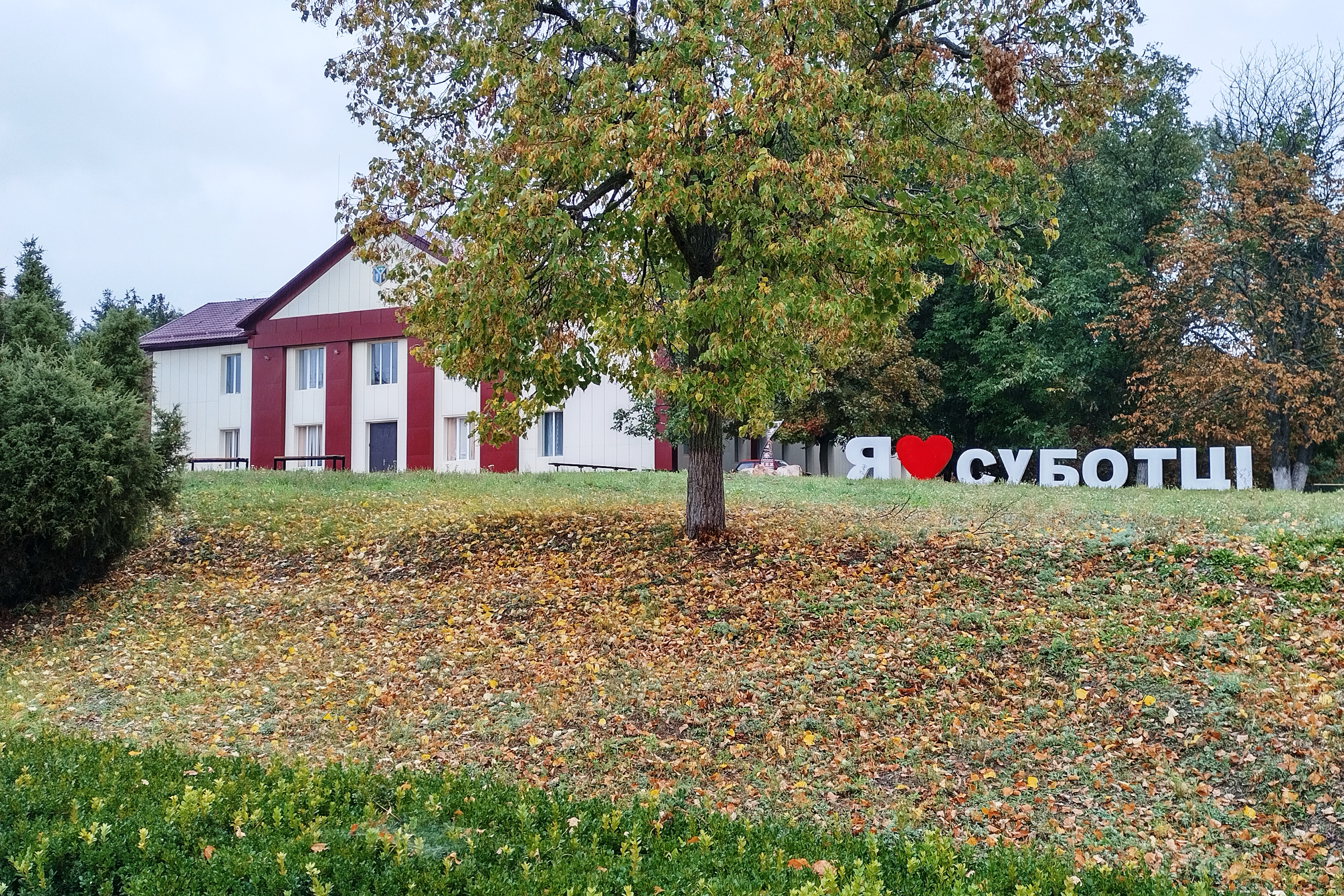

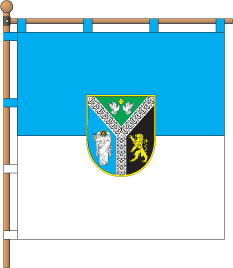
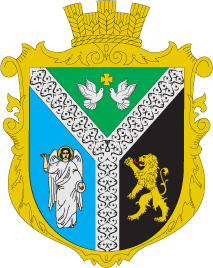
- Flag Coat of arms

- Location within Ukraine Location within Ukraine Kirovohrad Oblast
- Coordinates: 48°42′49″N 32°40′24″E
- Country: Ukraine
- Oblast: Kirovohrad Oblast
- Raion: Kropyvnytskyi Raion
- Founded: 1753

Area
  - Total: 6,428 km^{2} (2,482 sq mi)

Population (2022)
  - Total: 3,265
  - Density: 0.5079/km^{2} (1.316/sq mi)
- Postal code: 27444
- Area code: +380 5233

Subottsi (Ukrainian: Суботці) is a village in Kropyvnytskyi Raion, Kirovohrad Oblast, central Ukraine. It hosts the administration of Subottsi rural hromada, one of the hromadas of Ukraine.

== History ==
These lands were under the rule of the Ukrainian Cossacks of Hetmanate and Zaporozhian Sich from XV to XVIII century.

The village has its origins in a military settlement founded by Serb soldier migrants on the right bank of the Adzhamka river in 1753 as part of the New Serbia colony in Imperial Russia. The name of the village has Serbian roots, and is related to the modern Serbian-language placename Subotica (Serbian Cyrillic: Суботица). The Serbs had hostile relations with the local existing population, who saw the soldiers as a threat to their cultural identity. These differences and hostility between populations faded away with time. In 1886, there were 2791 people in the village.

During the Holodomor of 1932-1933, at least 300 villagers died.

During World War II, the invading armies of Nazi Germany, regionally led by Paul Ludwig Ewald von Kleist occupied Subottsi on 5 August 1941. The village was repulsed by the Red Army during the Kirovograd offensive on 5 January 1944.

During the Russo-Ukrainian war 20 local soldiers died

== Gallery ==
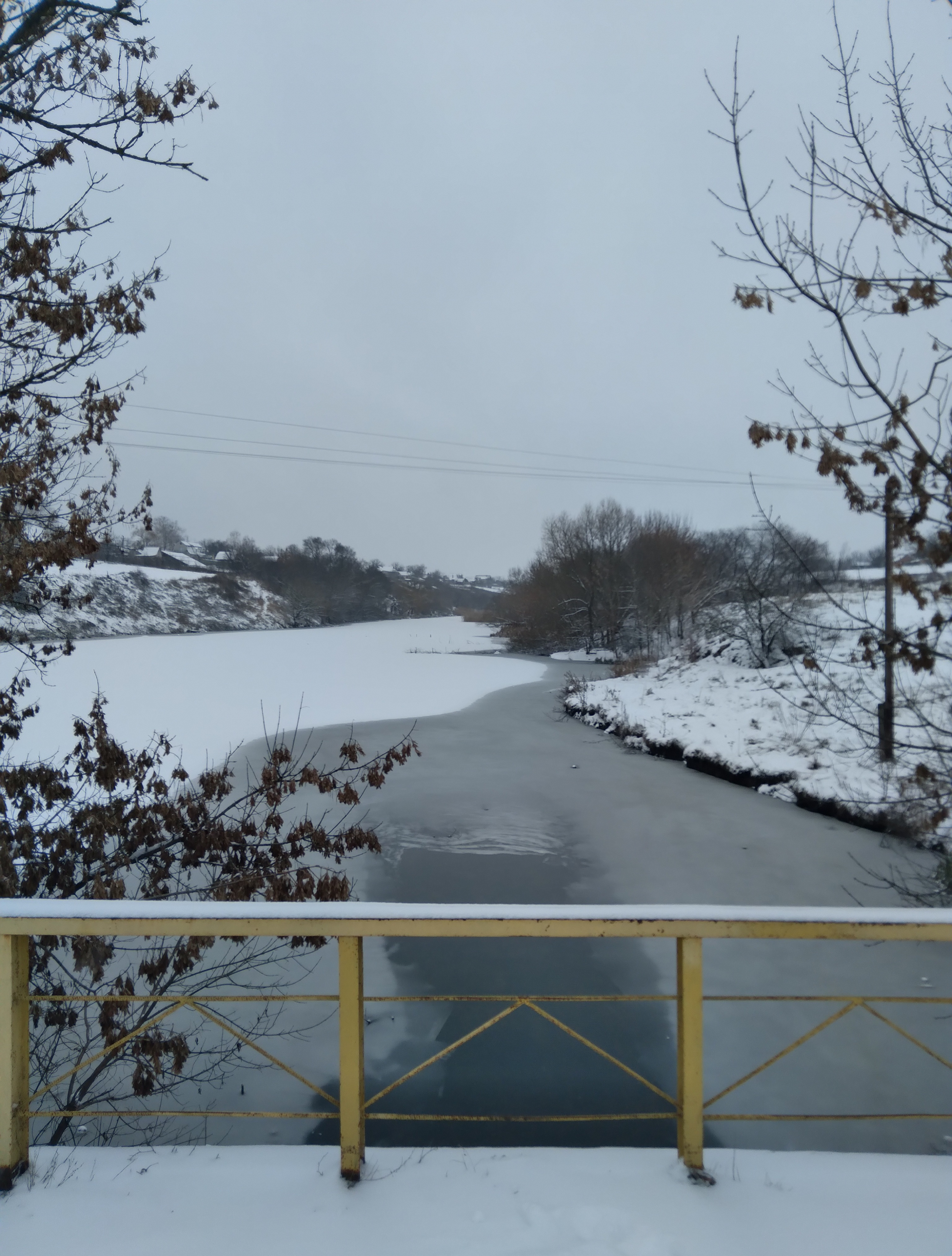
River

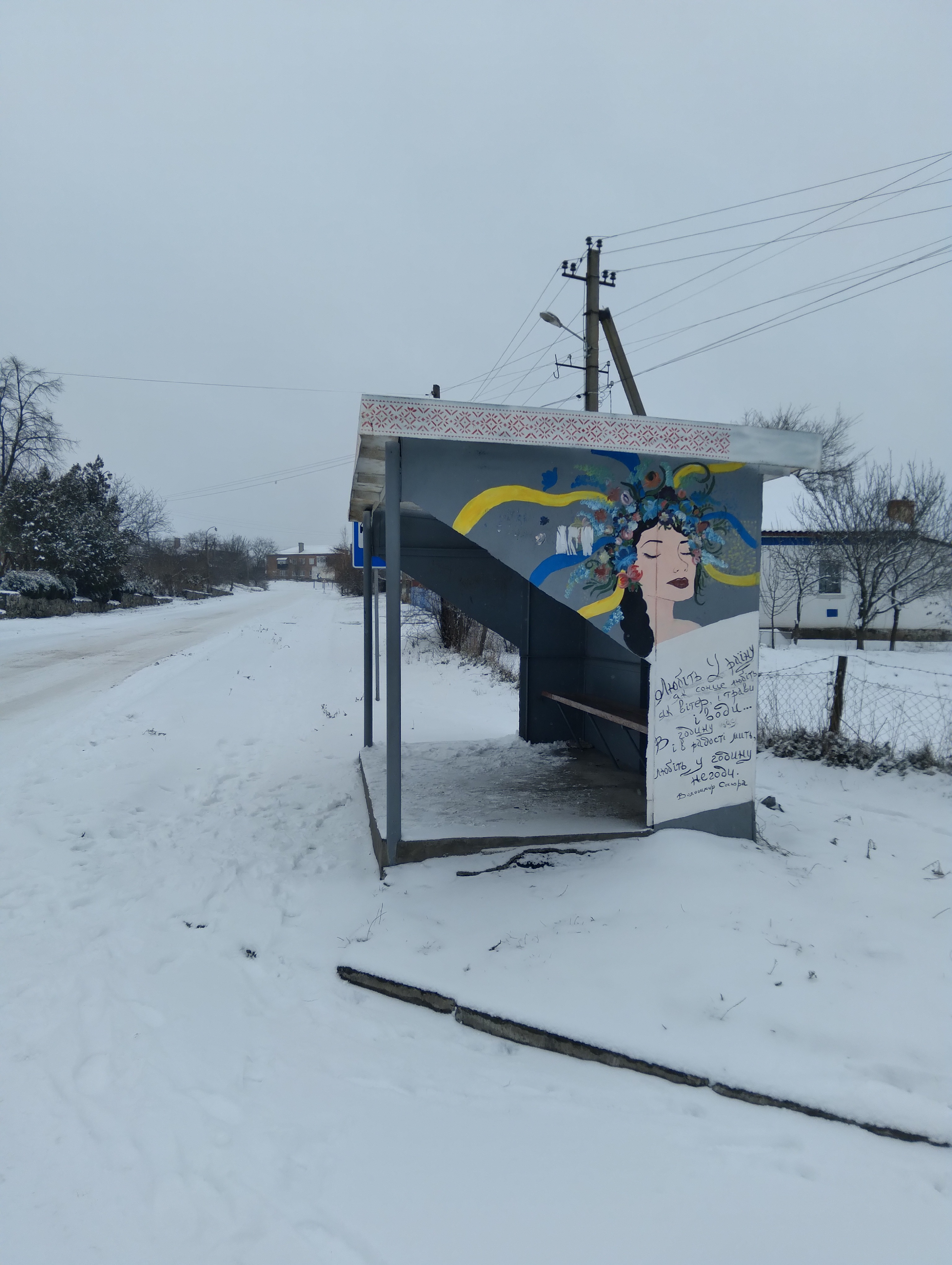
Graffiti in support of the Armed Forces (next to it are lines from Volodymyr Sosiura's poem: Love Ukraine)

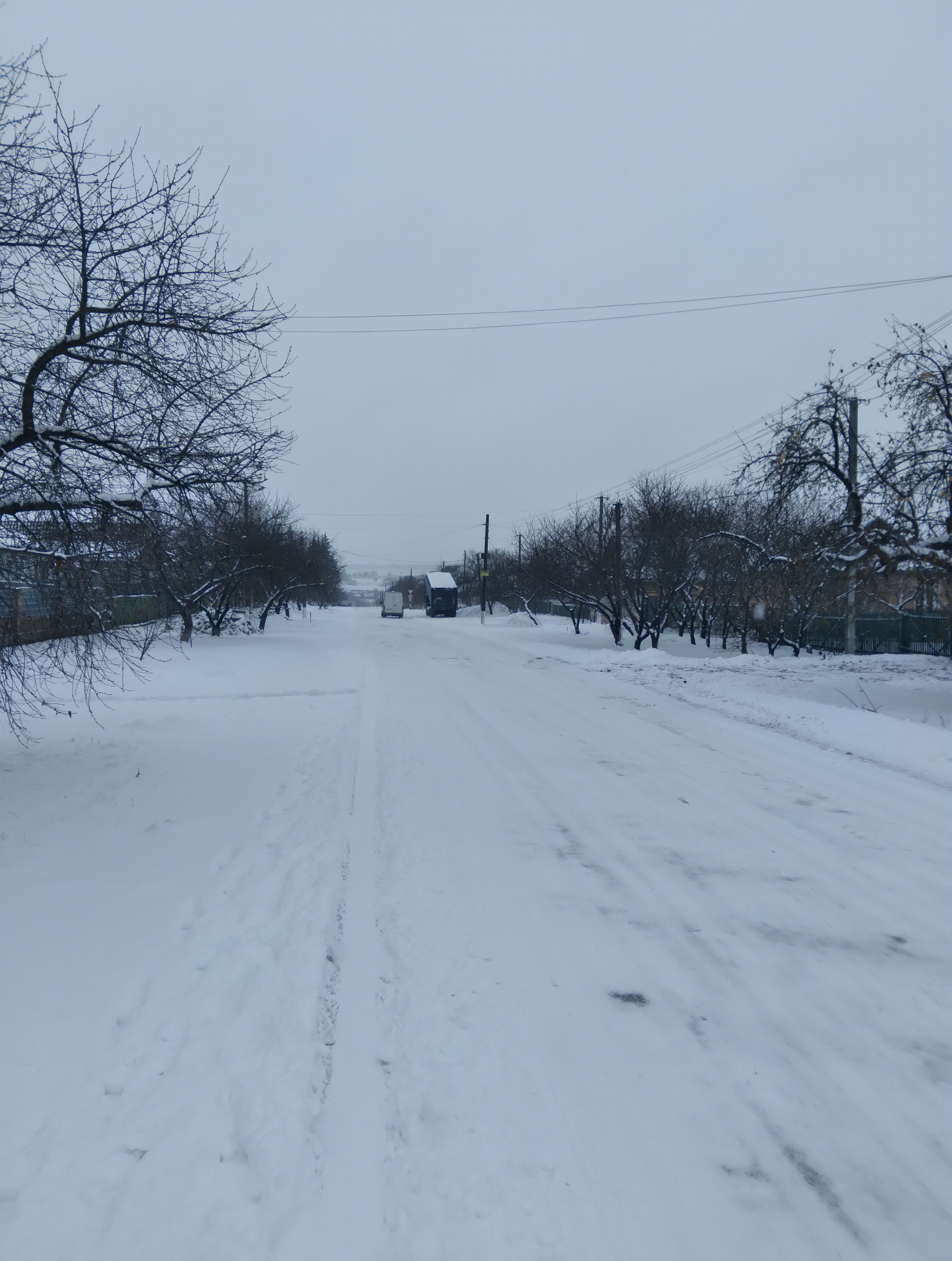
Central street
