= Volodymyrivka (Subottsi rural hromada) =

Village in Kirovohrad Oblast, Ukraine

Volodymyrivka Володимирівка
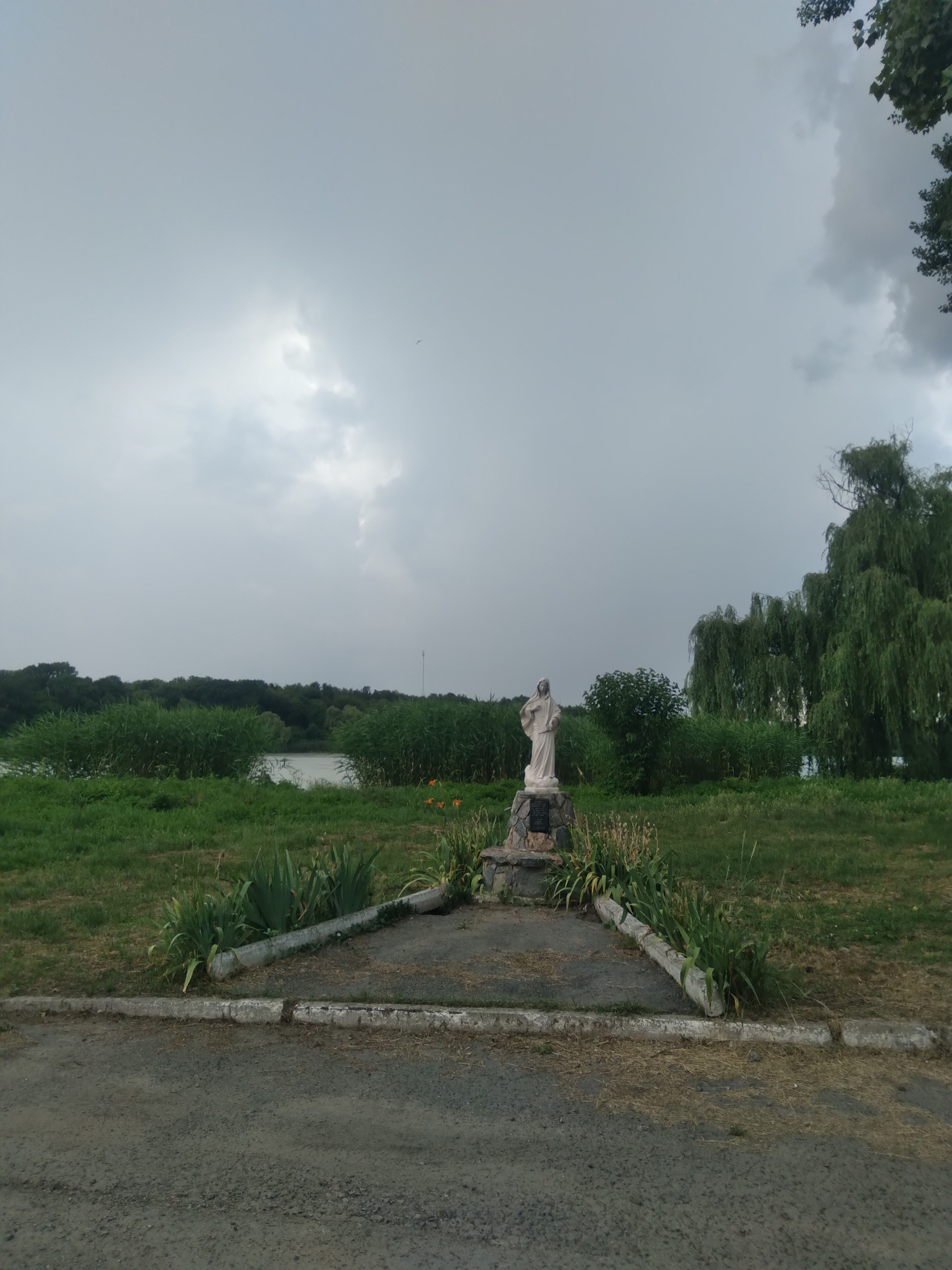

- Location within Ukraine Location within Ukraine Kirovohrad Oblast
- Coordinates: 48°38′45″N 32°40′41″E
- Country: Ukraine
- Oblast: Kirovohrad Oblast
- Raion: Kropyvnytskyi Raion
- Founded: before 1900

Area
  - Total: 18,259 km^{2} (7,050 sq mi)

Population (2022)
  - Total: 1,384
  - Density: 0.07580/km^{2} (0.1963/sq mi)

Volodymyrivka (Ukrainian: Володимирівка) is a village in central Ukraine, Kropyvnytskyi Raion, Kirovohrad Oblast, in Subottsi rural hromada. It has a population of 1,384 (2022 estimate).

== Geography ==
The Beshka River flows through the territory of the village

== History ==
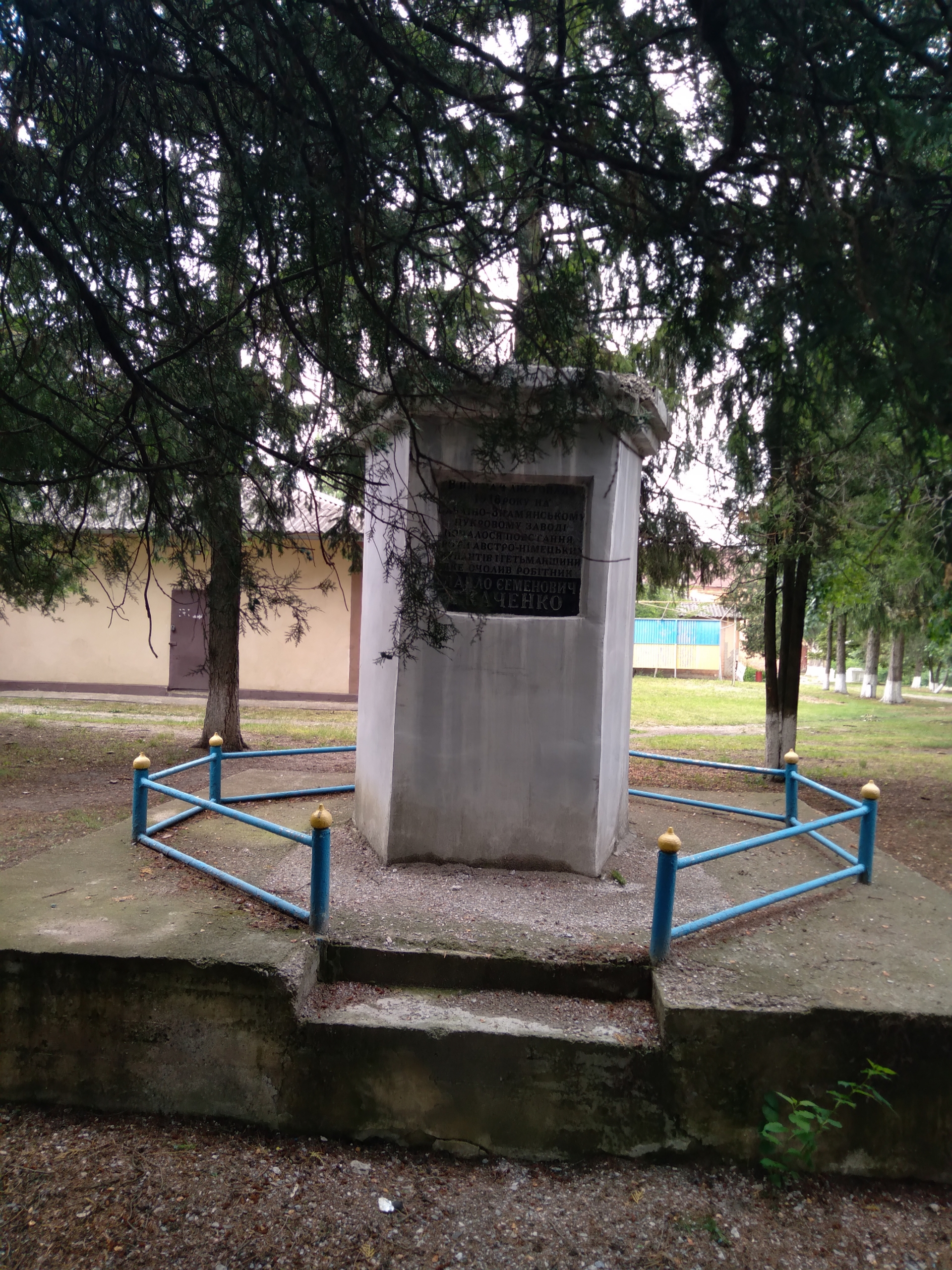
Monument to the uprising of 1918

During the Ukrainian–Soviet War of 1917–1921, at the night of November 4, 1918, an uprising took place at a local sugar factory for the revival of the Ukrainian People's Republic, which was led by one of the workers, Pavlo Semenovych Tkachenko.

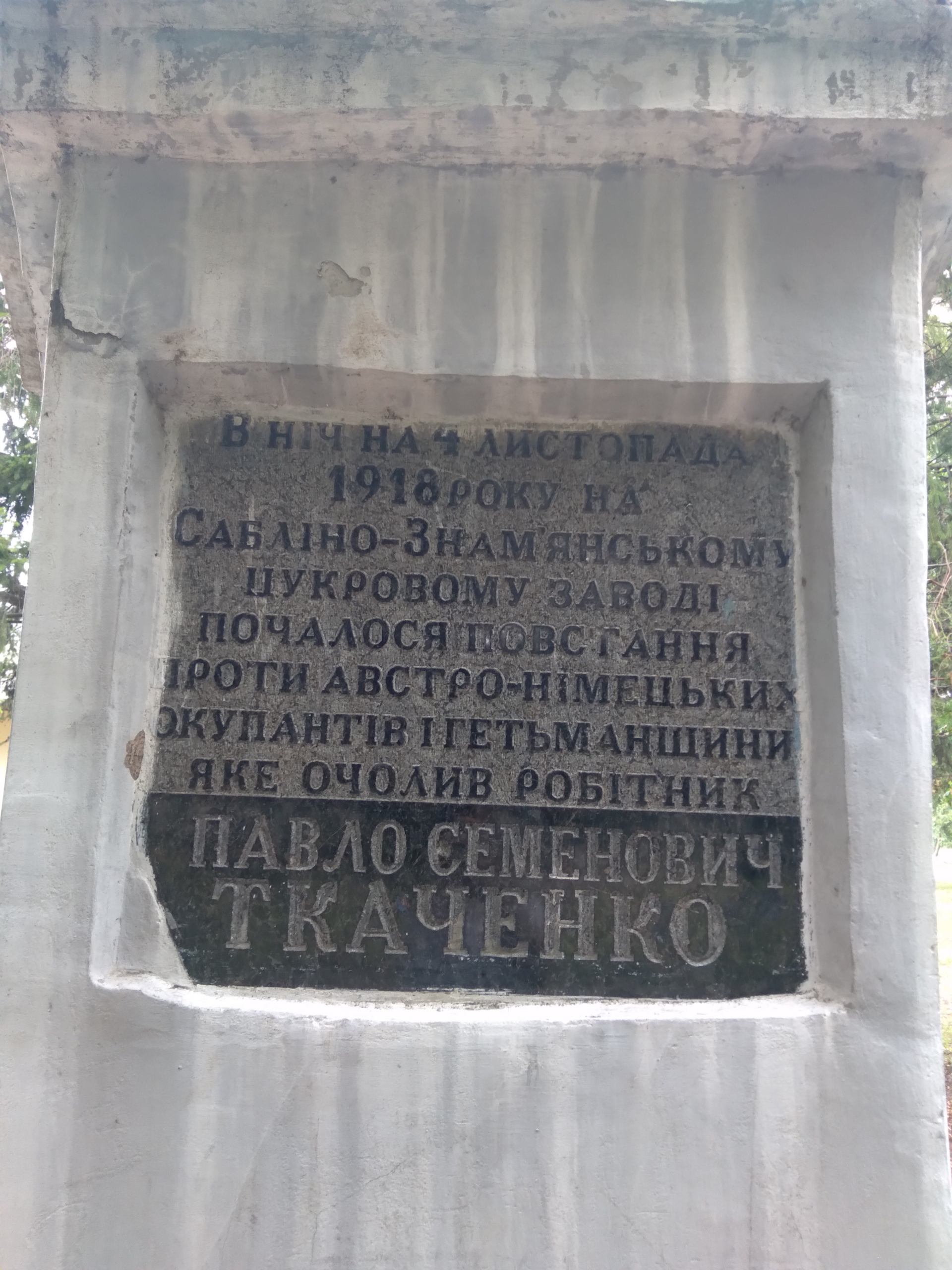
Plaque on the monument

During the Holodomor of 1932–1933, at least 5 villagers died.

During the Russo-Ukrainian War a local volunteer Viktor Yarmoshevych died, a memorial plaque was opened in his honor.

== Gallery ==
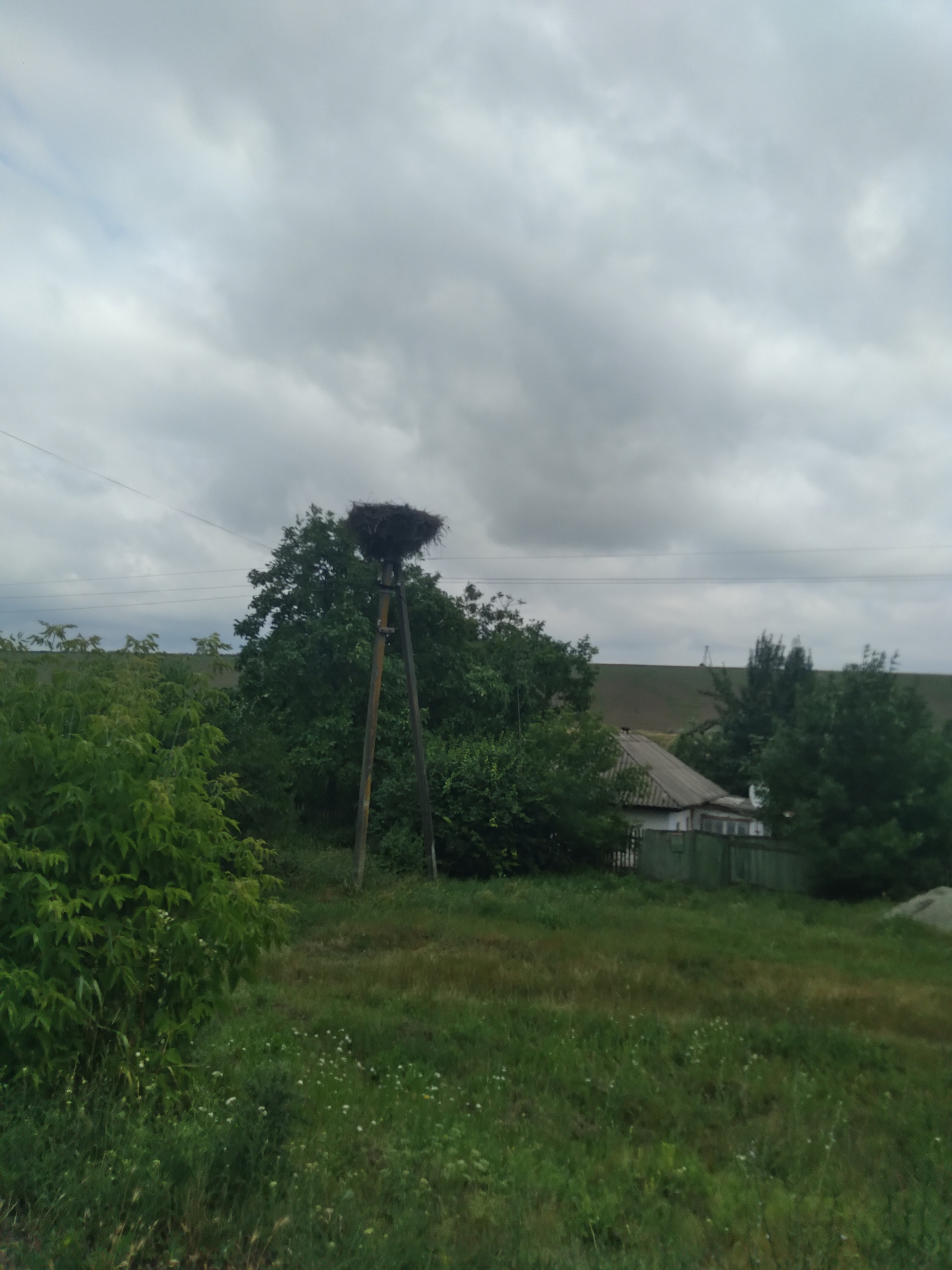

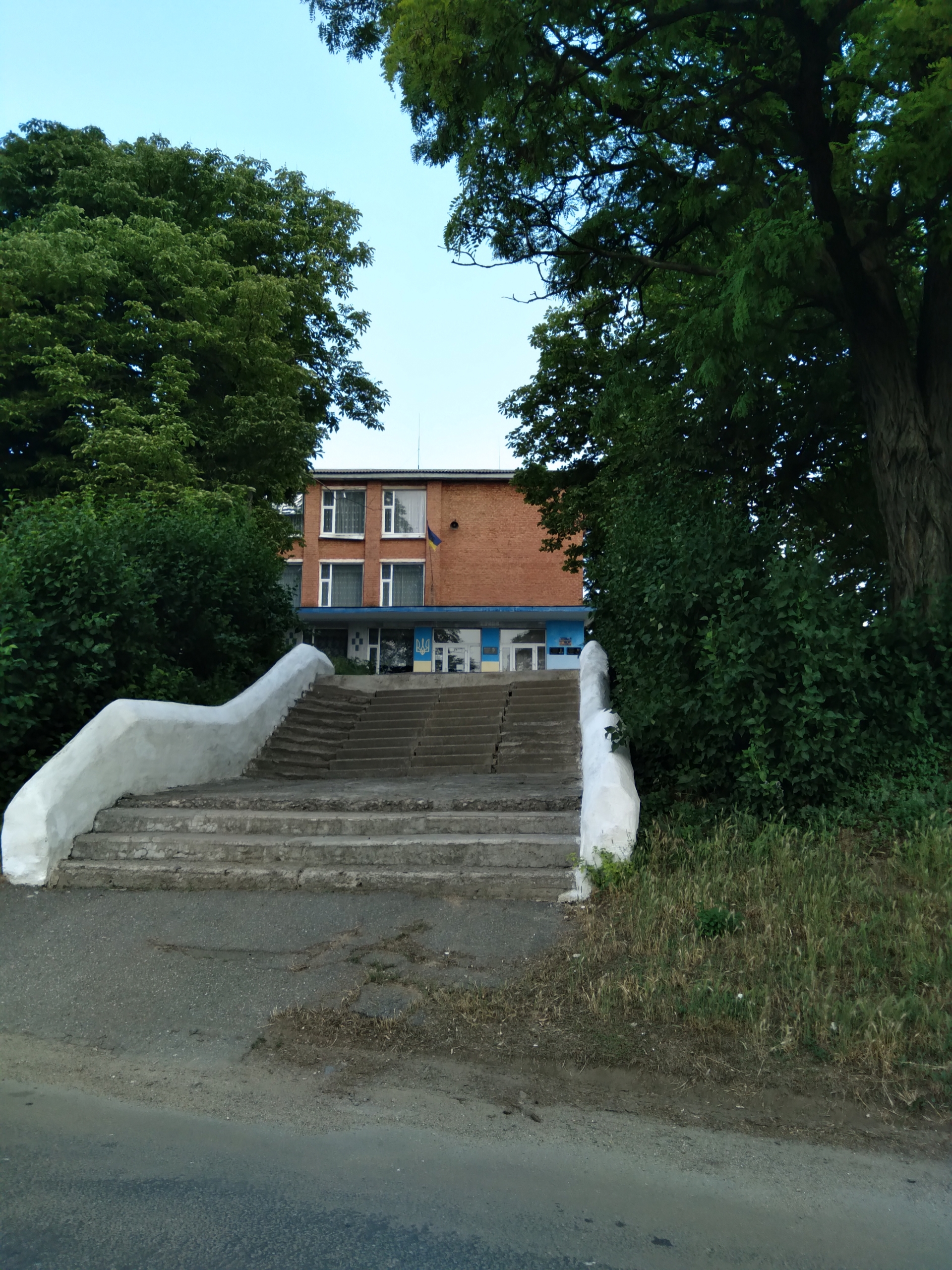

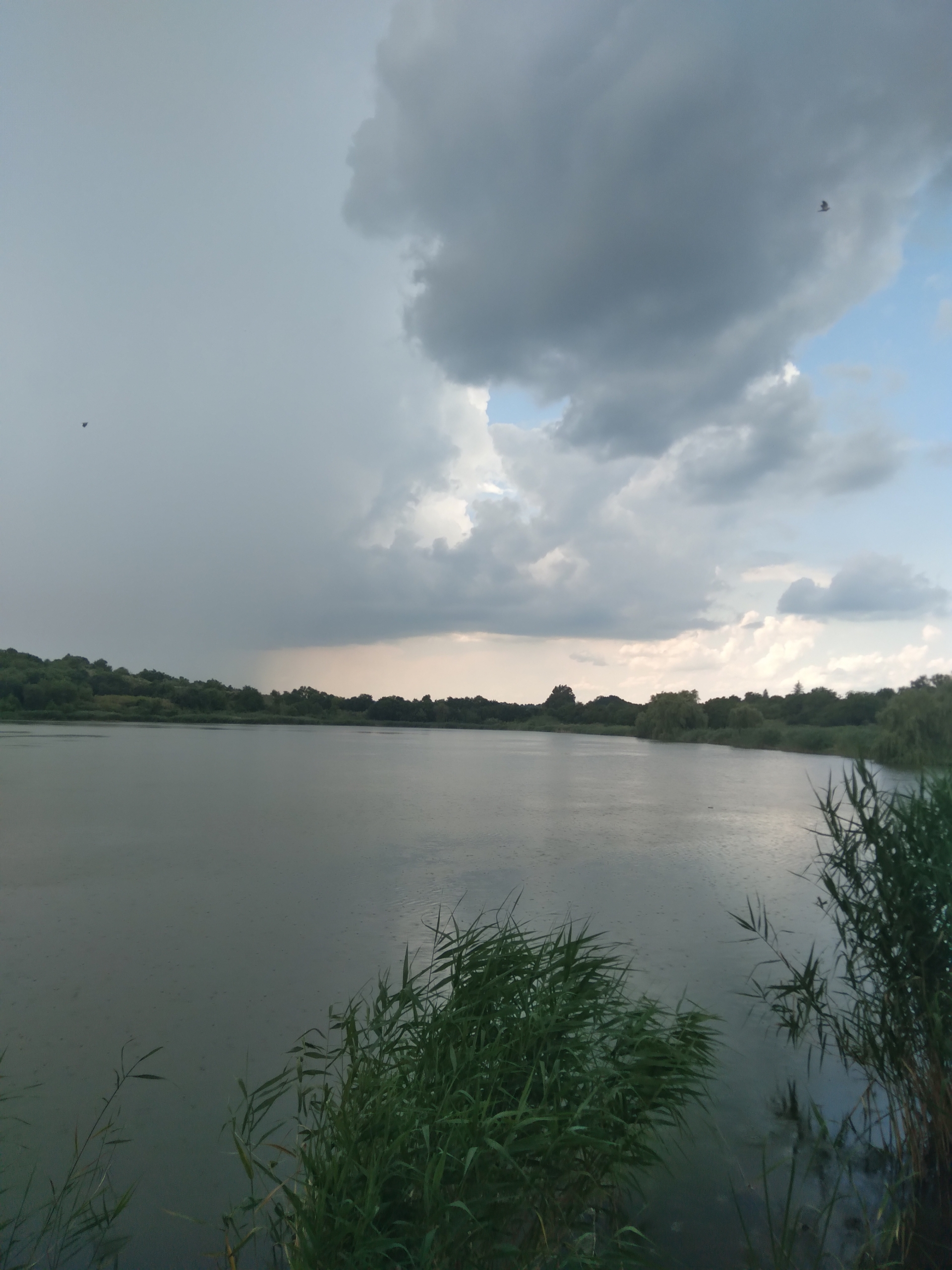

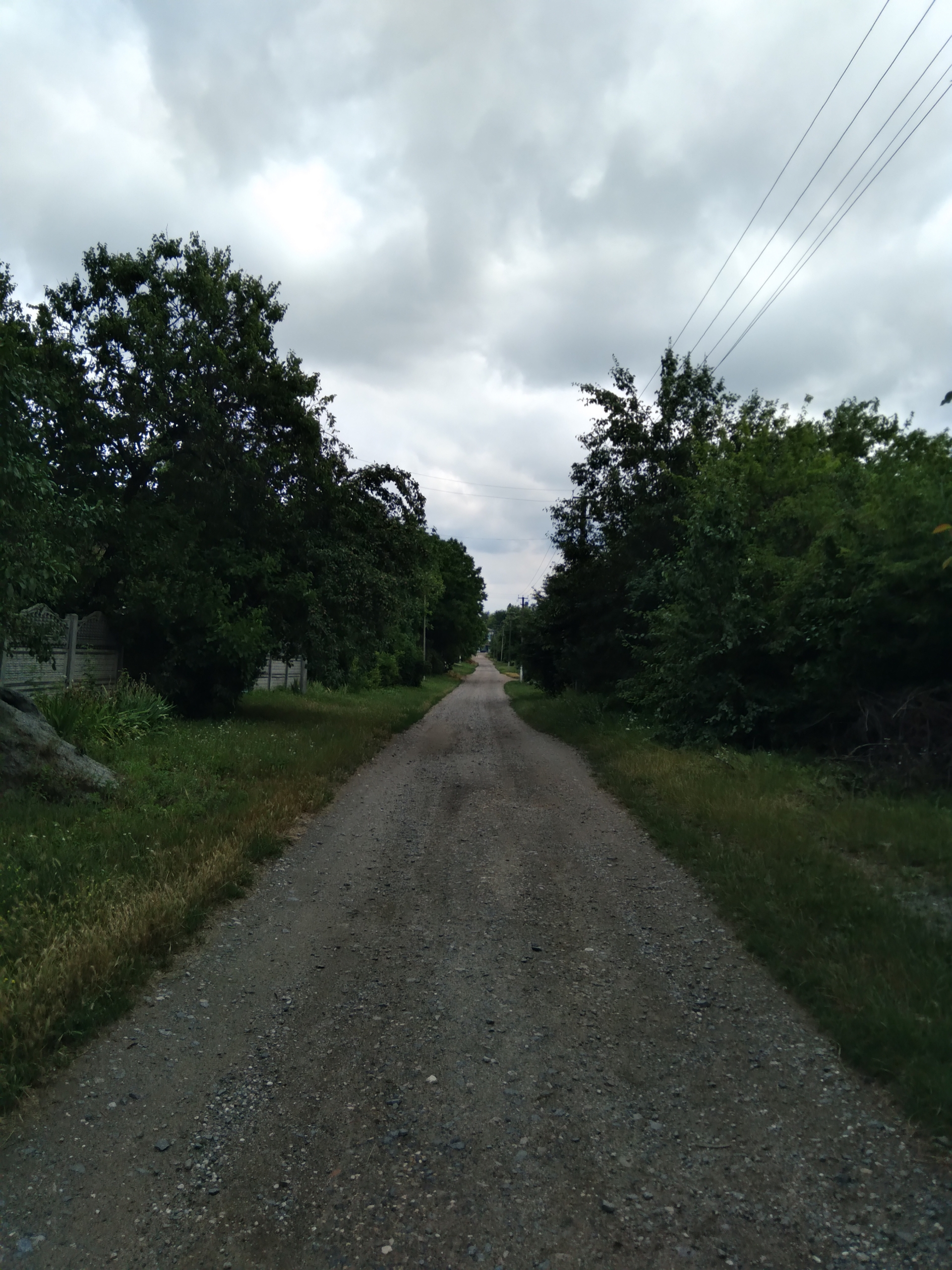

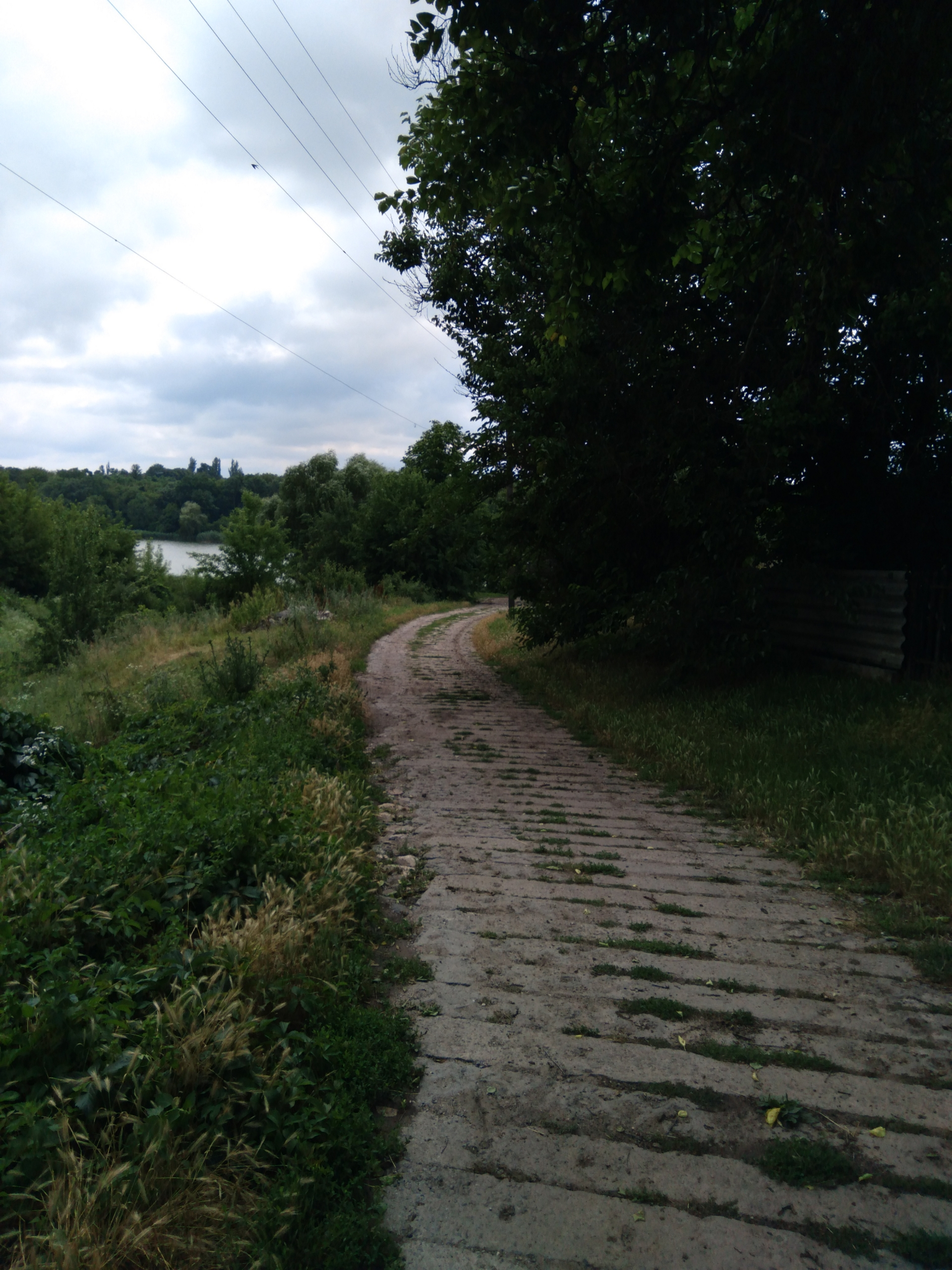

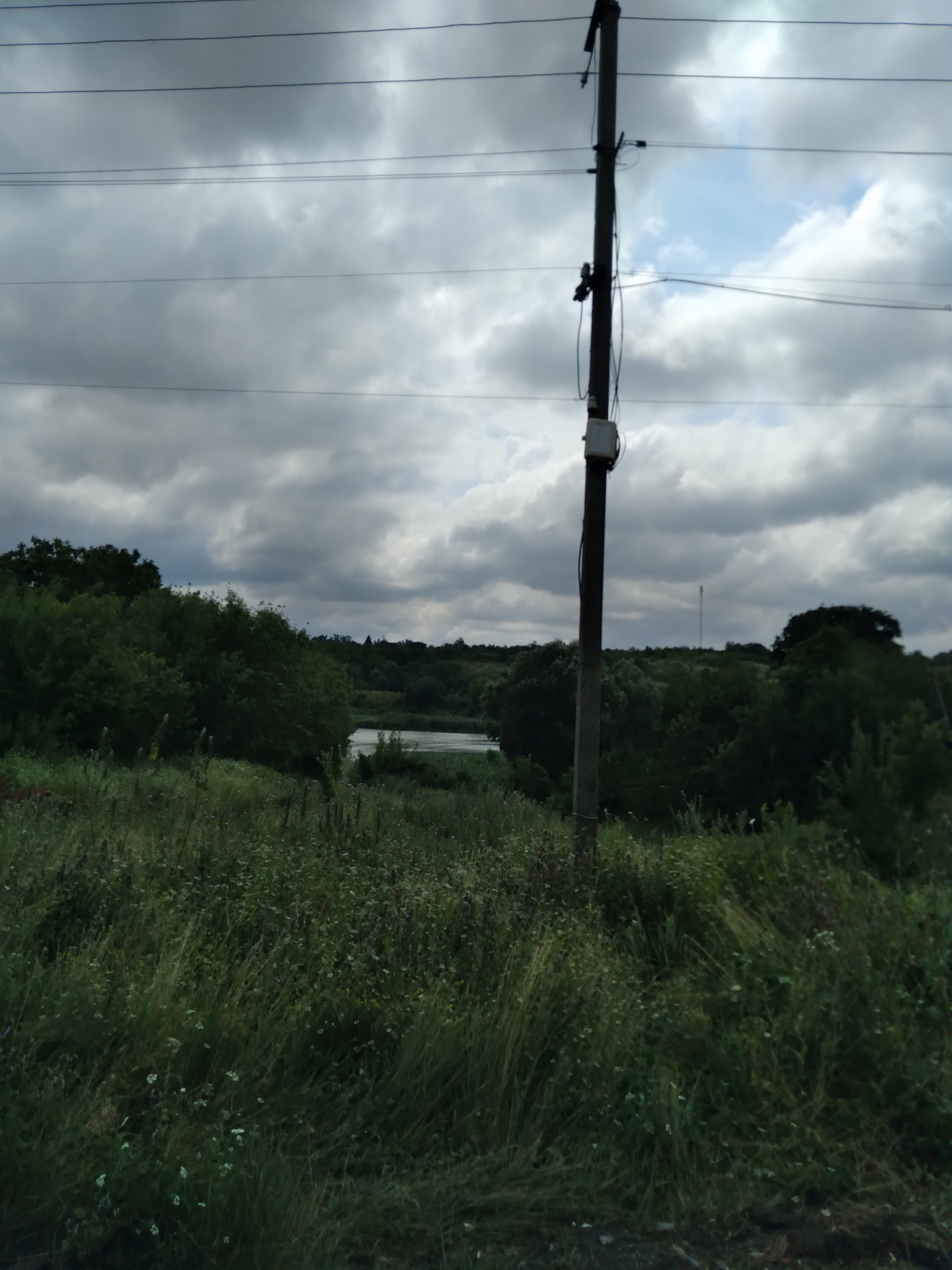

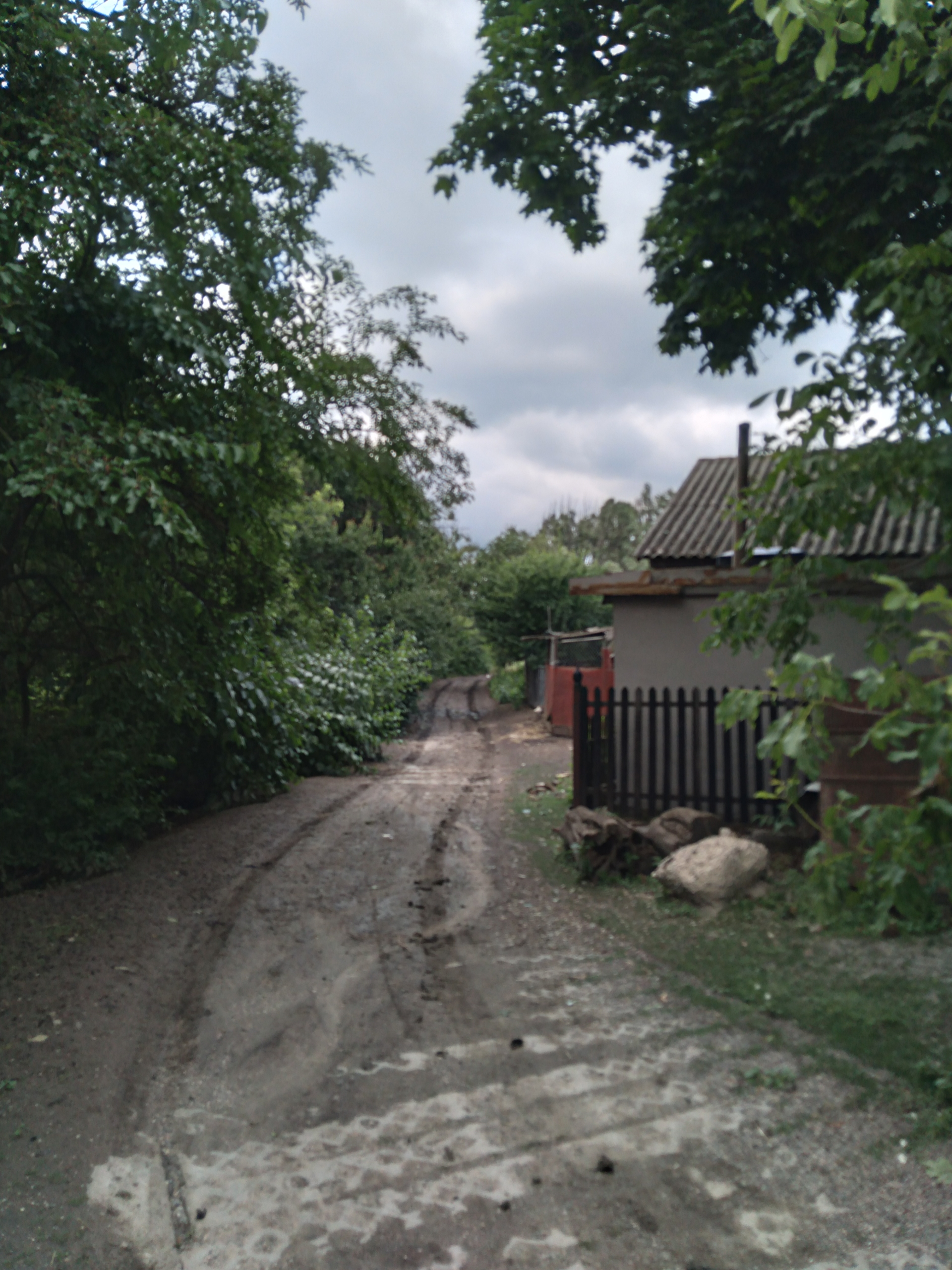

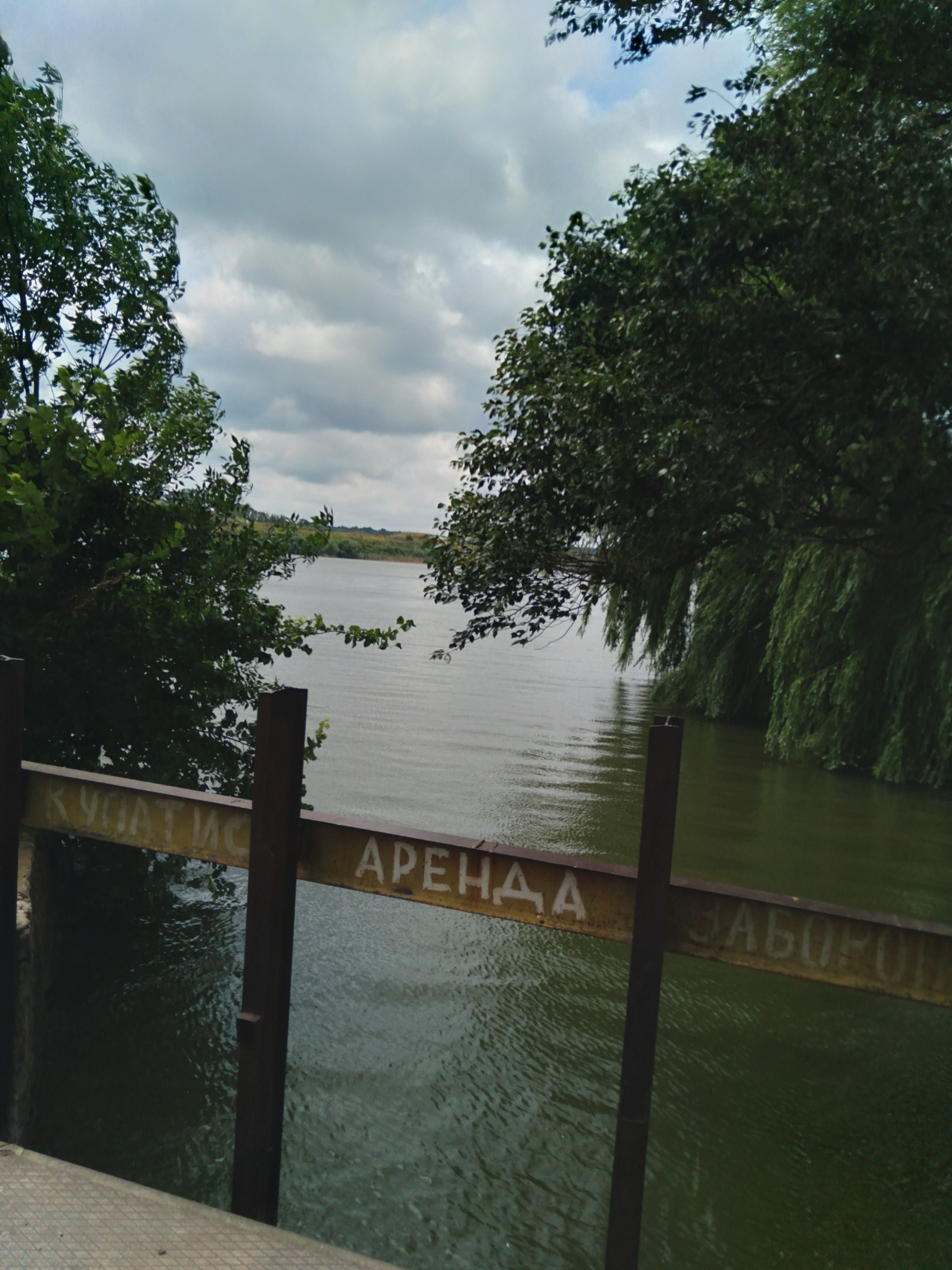

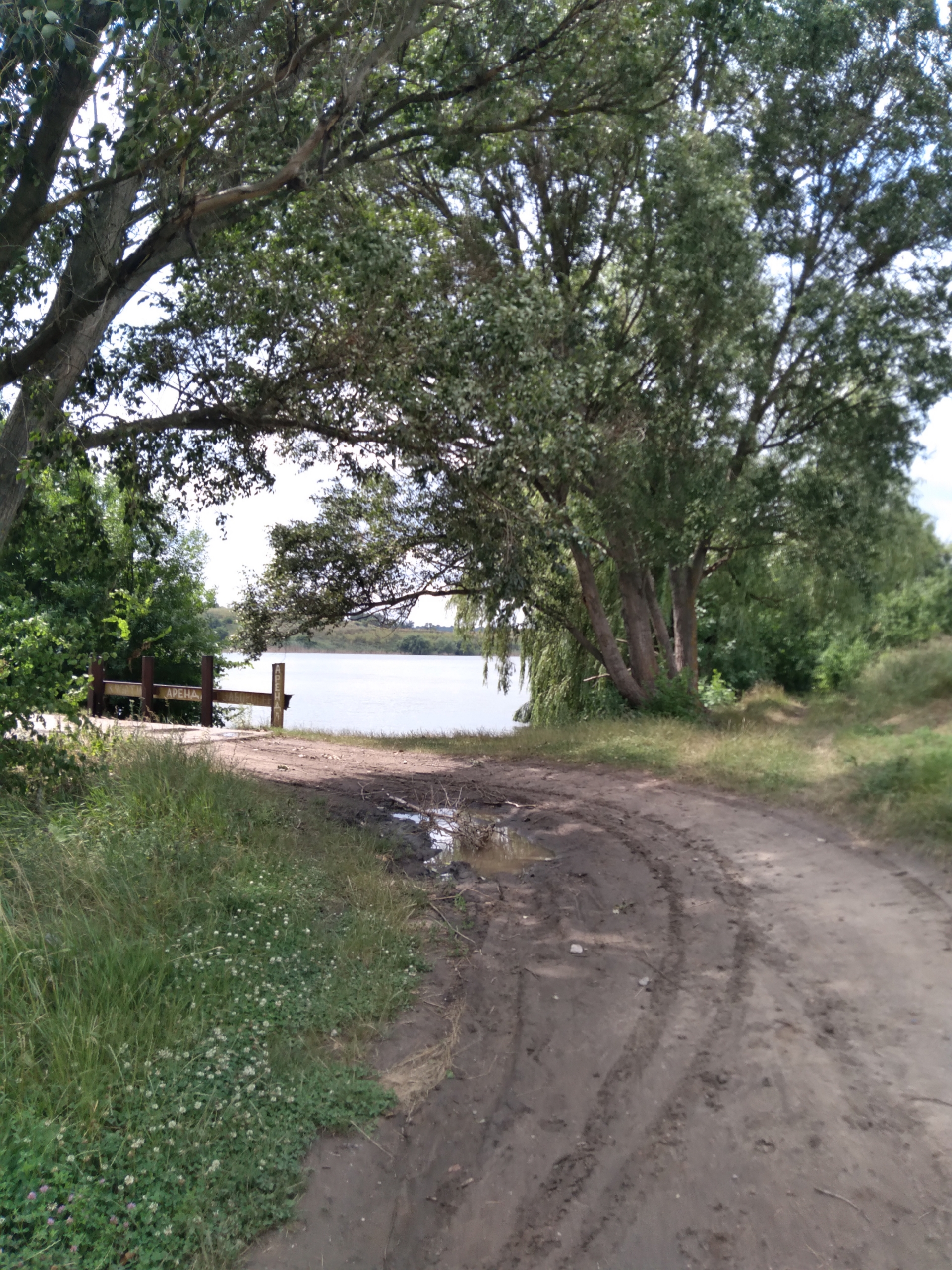

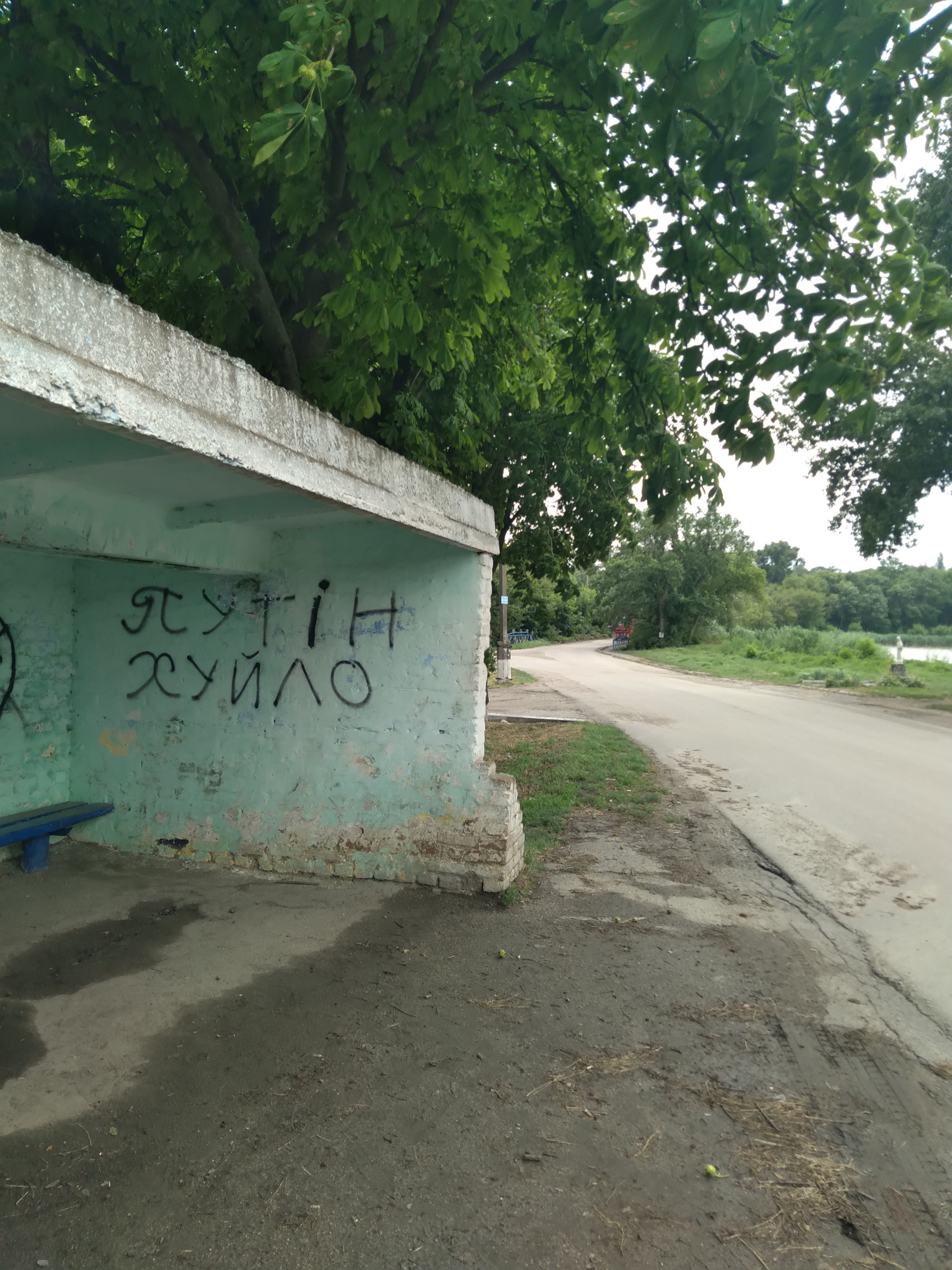

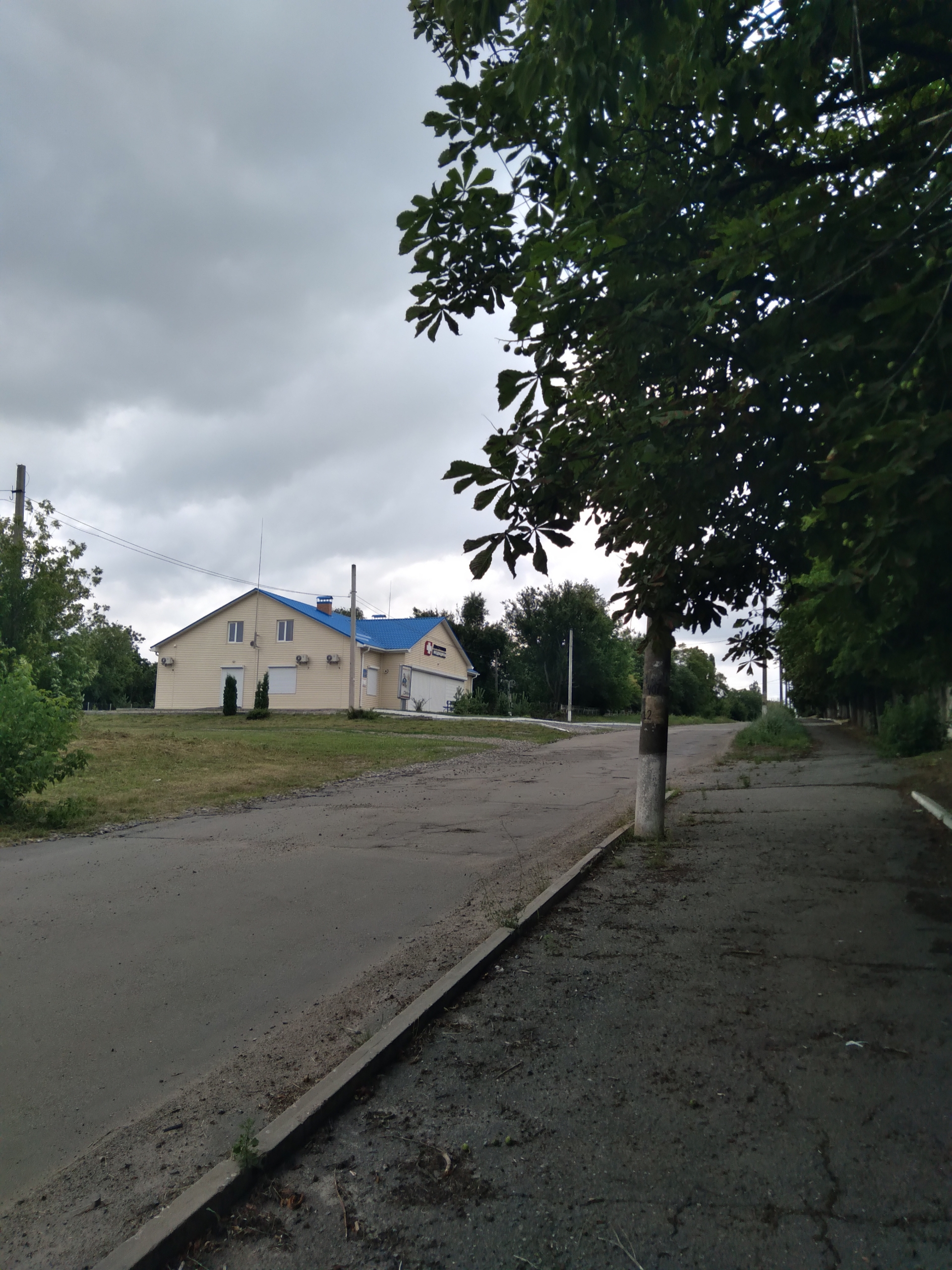

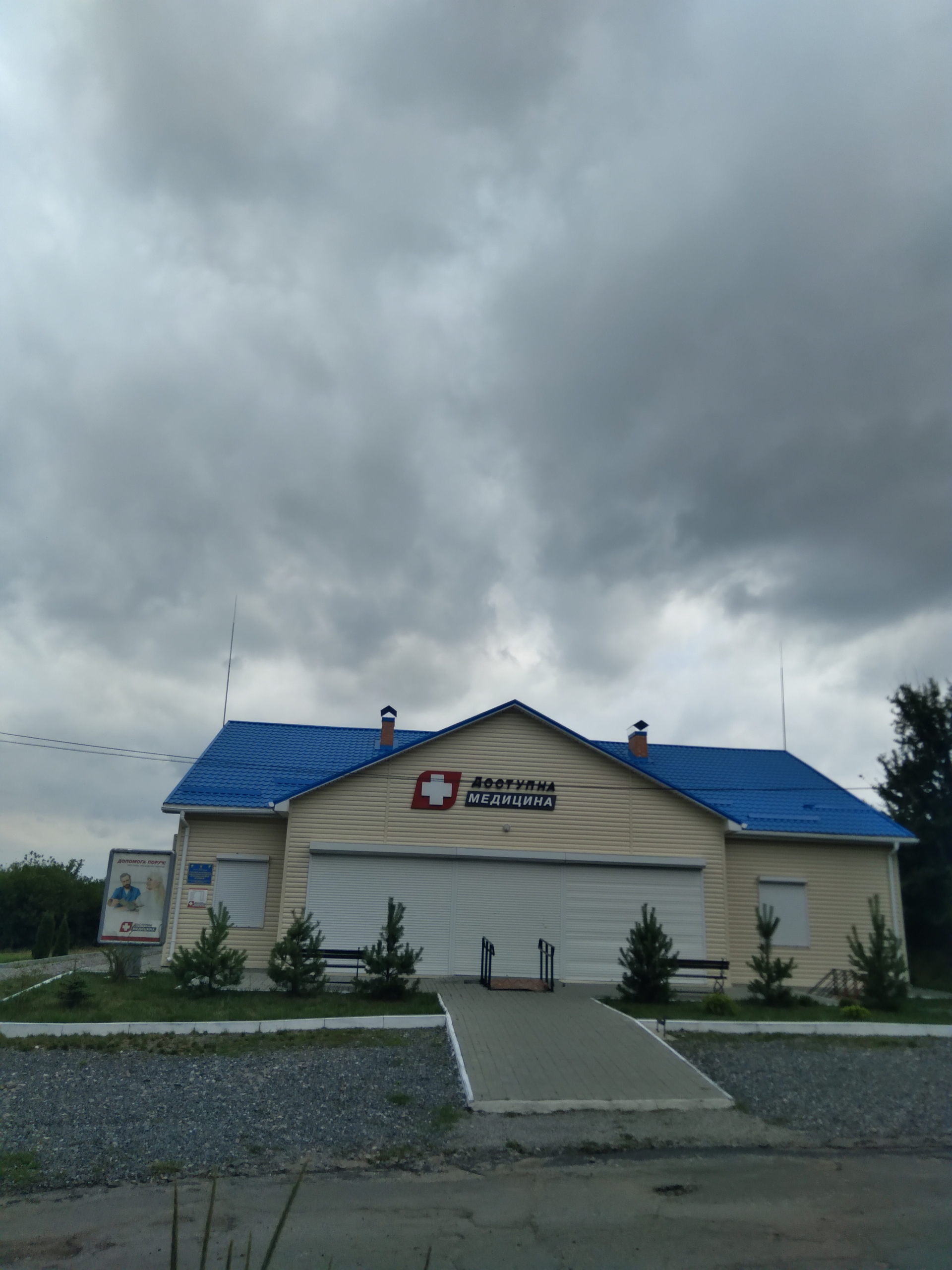

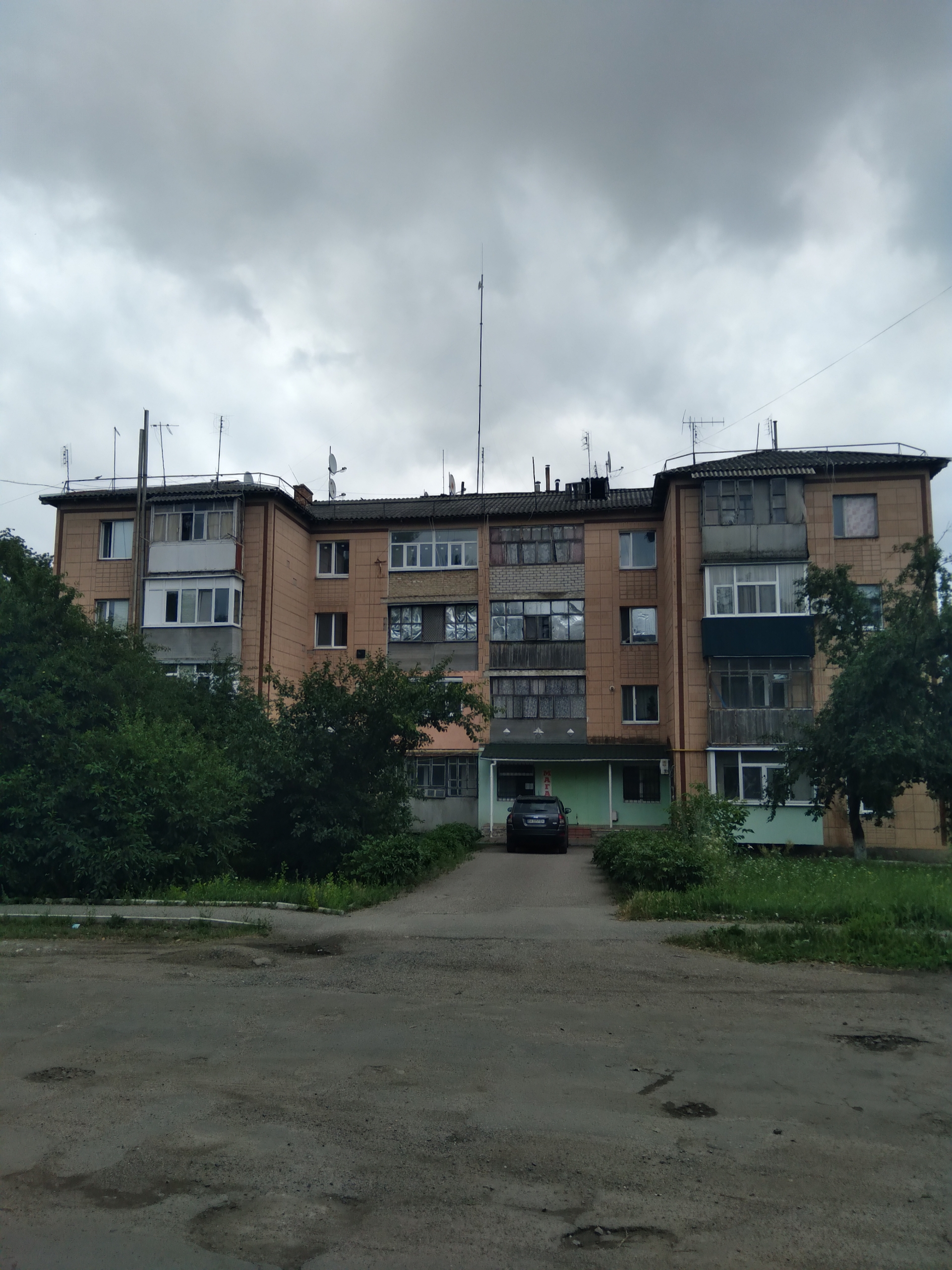

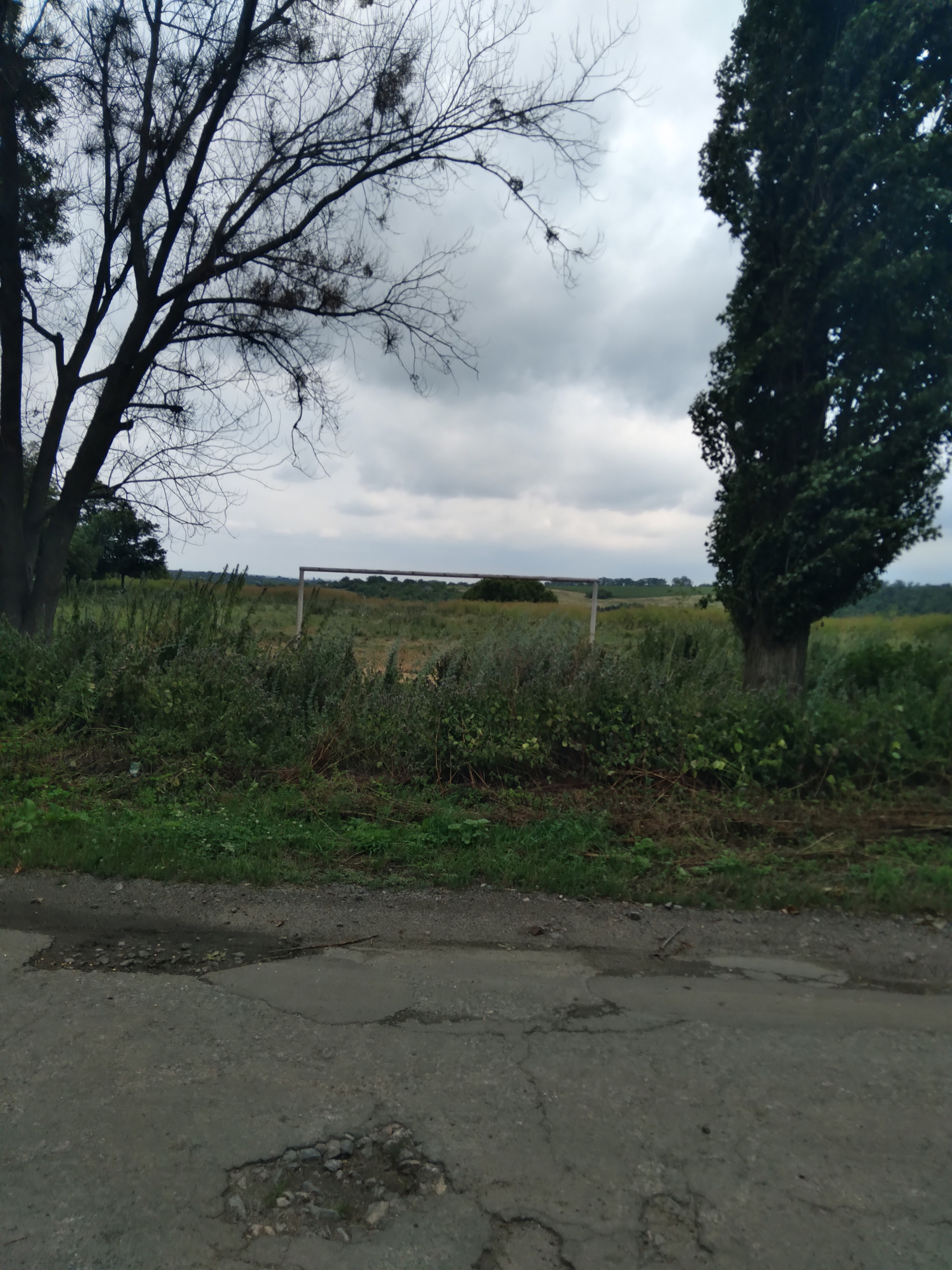

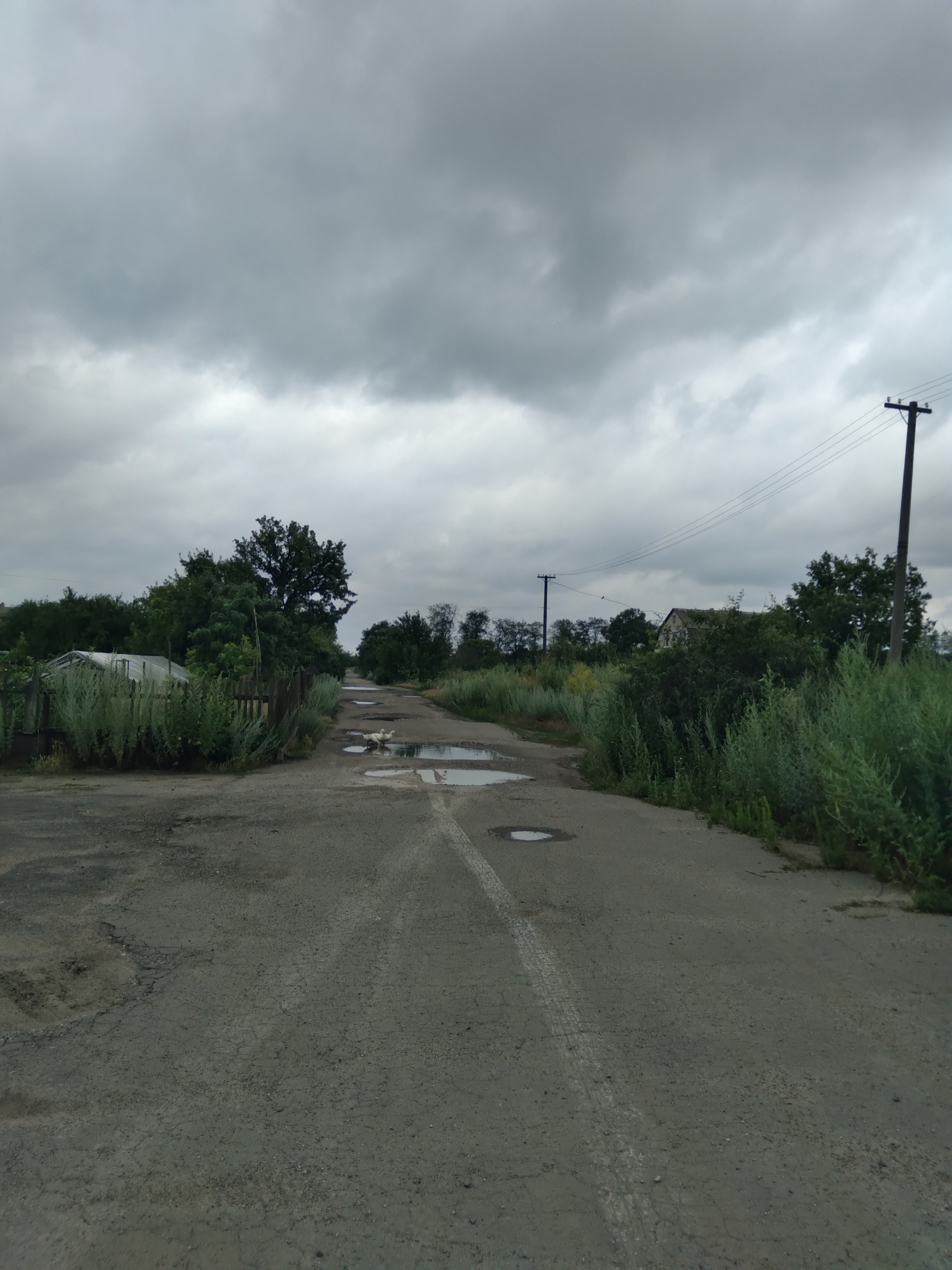

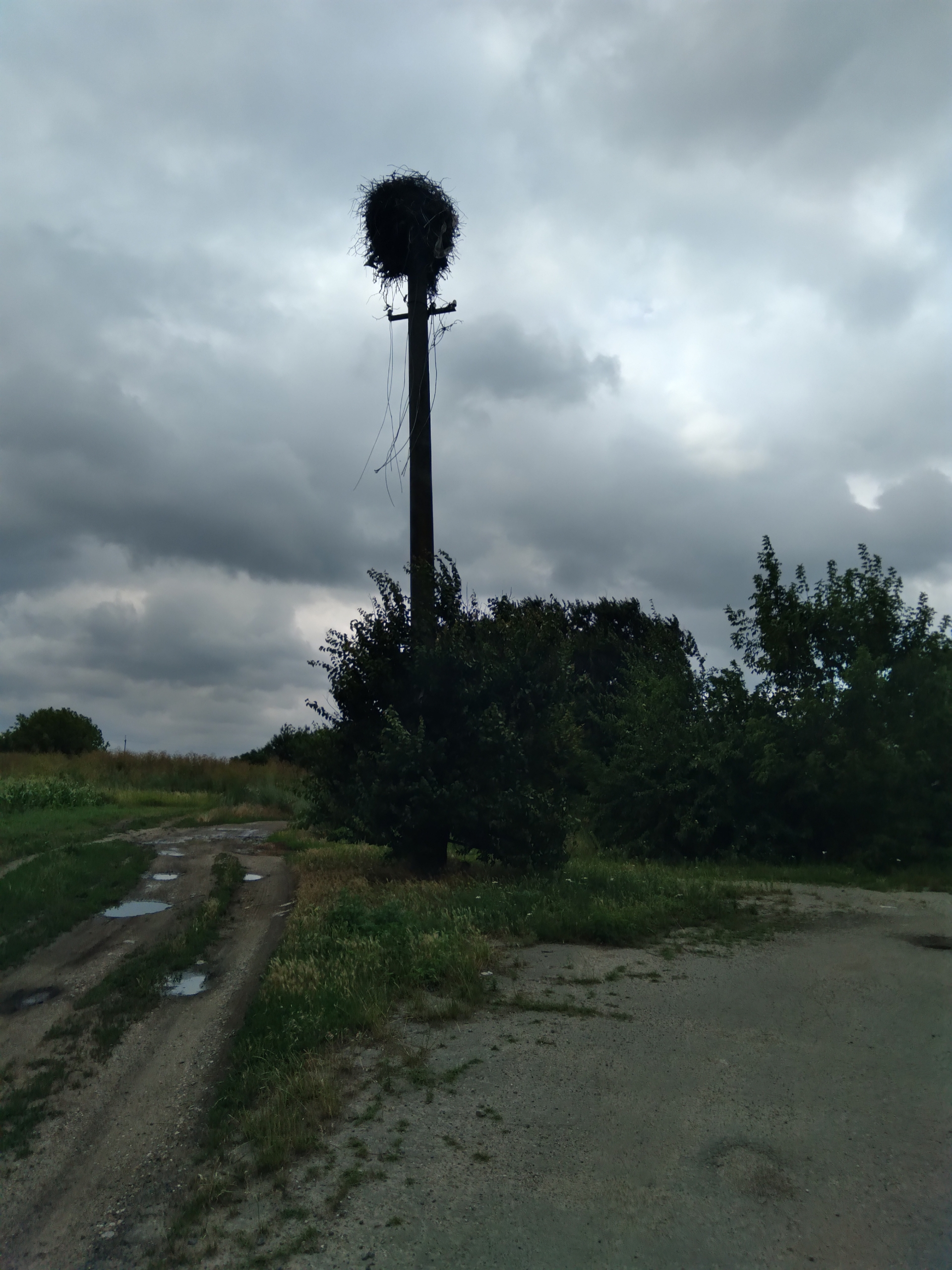

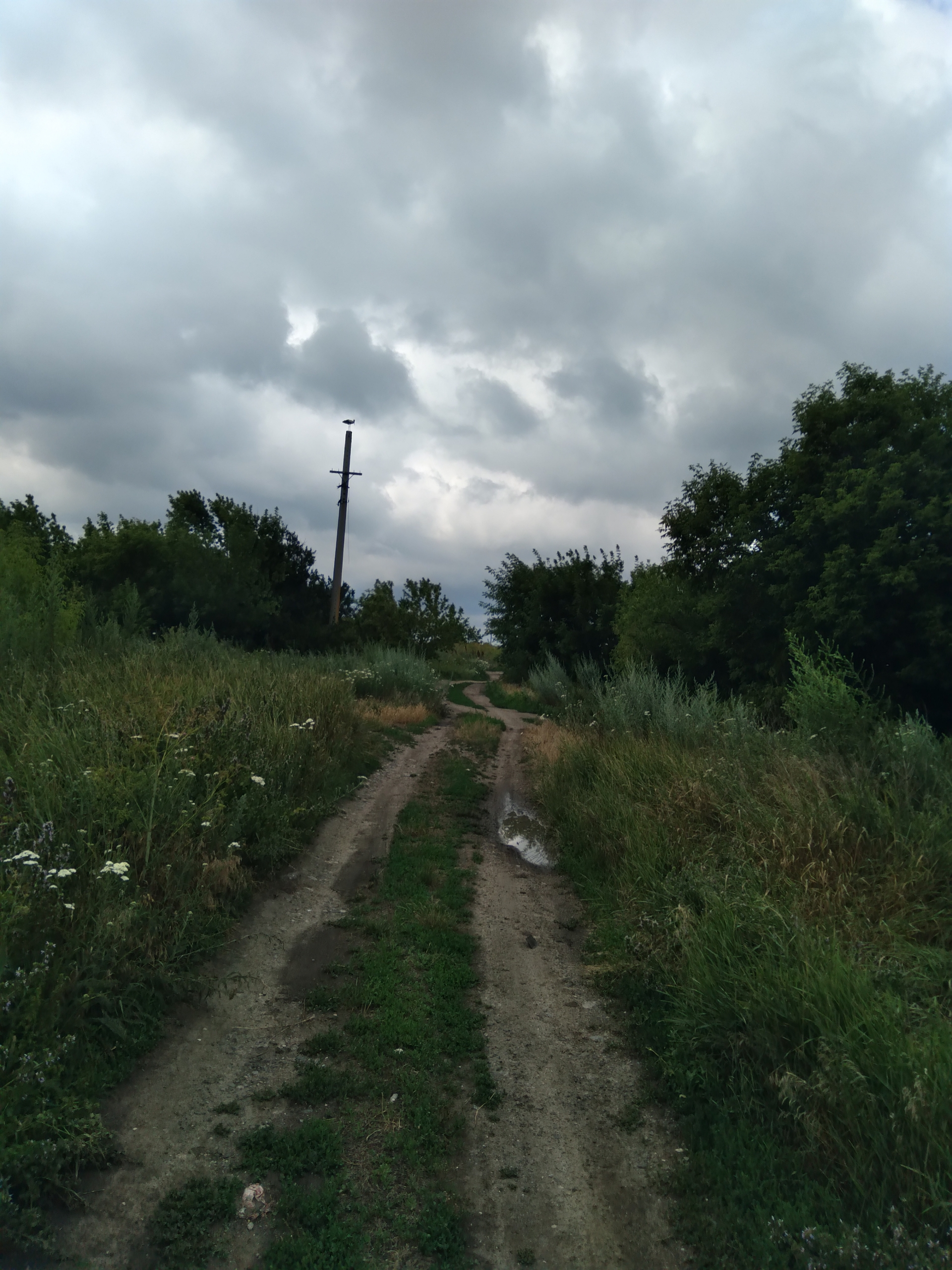

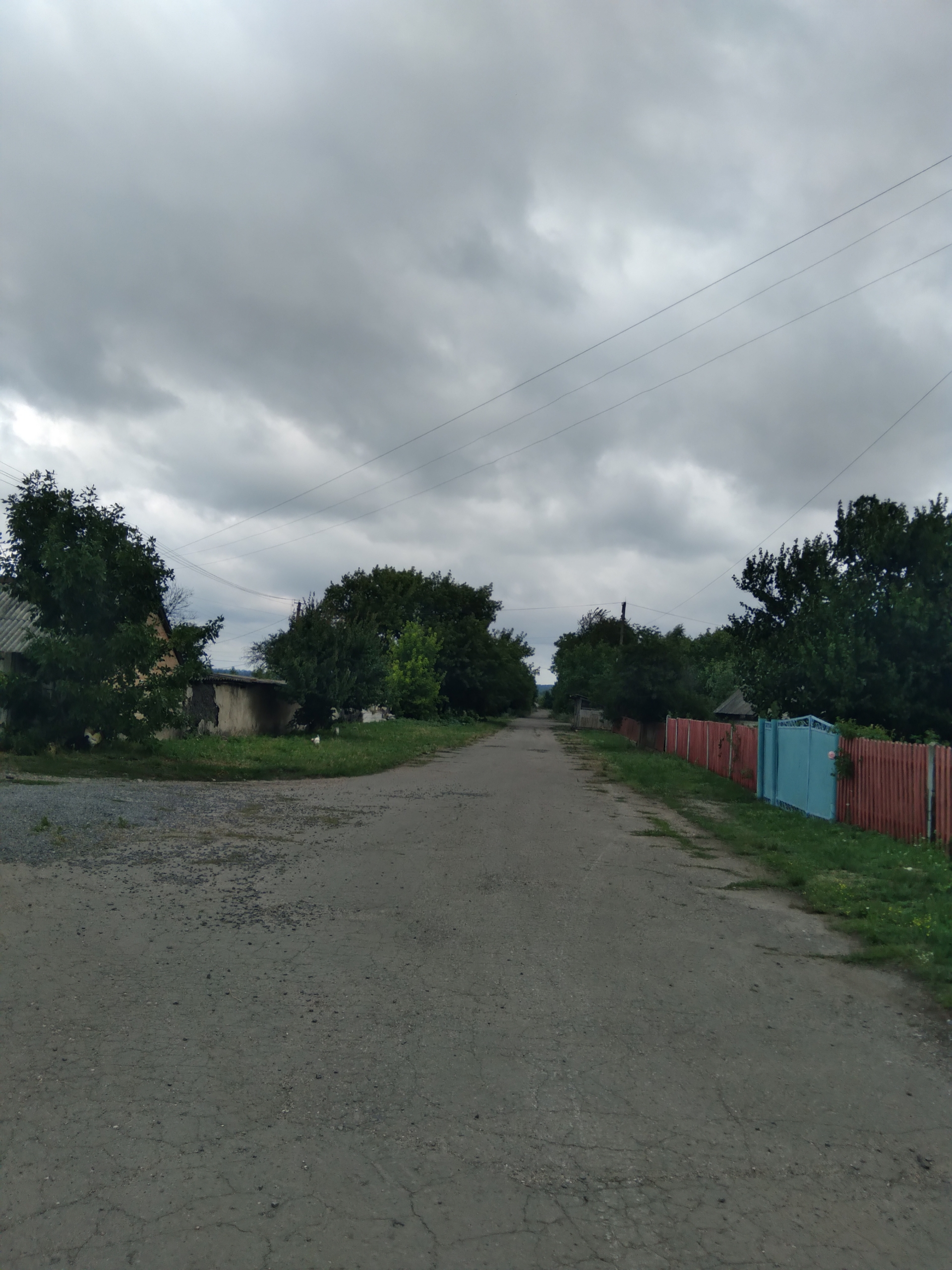
