= List of villages in Cherkasy Oblast =

The following is a list of villages in the Cherkasy Oblast of Ukraine.

== Cherkasy Raion ==
- Biloziria
- Derenkovets
- Heronymivka
- Holovkivka
- Kostiantynivka
- Mezhyrich
- Ozeryshche
- Subotiv
- Trakhtemyriv
- Tymoshivka

== Uman Raion ==
- Ivanhorod
- Ladyzhynka
- Okhmativ
- Zelenyi Hai

== Zolotonosha Raion ==
- Blahodatne
- Novoukrainka

== Zvenyhorodka Raion ==
- Brodetske
- Buzhanka
- Lebedyn
- Maidanetske
- Mariaivka
- Moryntsi
- Talianky
- Vynohrad
