= Serhii Nahorniak =

- Сергій Володимирович Нагорняк
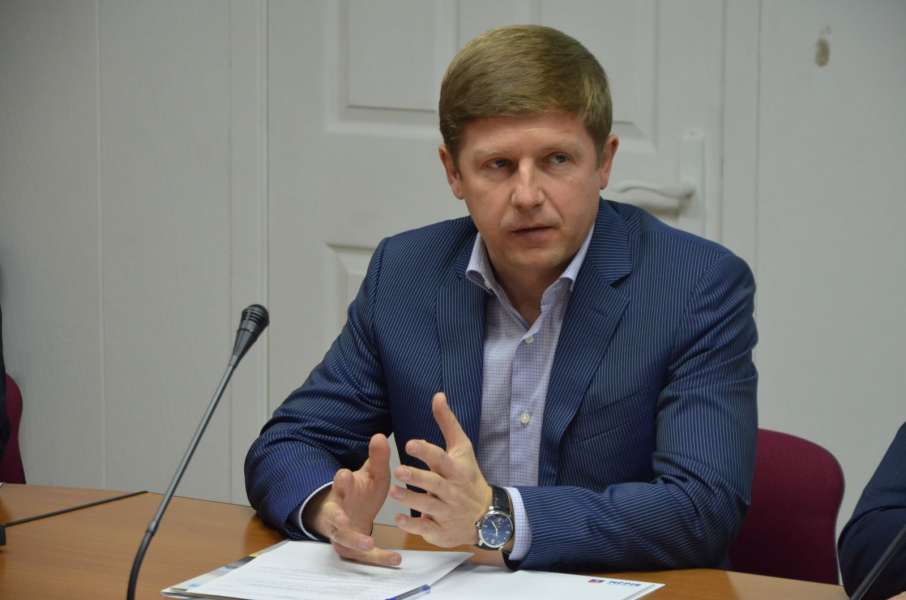

People's Deputy of Ukraine 9th convocation
- Incumbent
- Assumed office 29 August 2019
- President: Volodymyr Zelenskyy
- Constituency: Constituency No. 199, Cherkasy Oblast

Personal details
- Born: 13 May 1982 (age 44) Popilnia, Zhytomyr Oblast, Ukrainian SSR, Soviet Union (now Ukraine)
- Party: Servant of the People
- Children: 5
- Education: Taras Shevchenko National University of Kyiv
- Occupation: entrepreneur, politician

Serhii Volodymyrovych Nahorniak (Ukrainian: Сергій Володимирович Нагорняк; born 13 May 1982) is a Ukrainian entrepreneur and politician currently serving as a People's Deputy of Ukraine representing Cherkasy Oblast's electoral district No. 199 from the Servant of the People party since 2019. He is a member of the Verkhovna Rada committee on energy and housing and utility services, and heads the subcommittee on energy saving and energy efficiency.

== Early life and education ==
Serhii Nahorniak was born on 13 May 1982 in the urban-type settlement of Popilnia in Zhytomyr Oblast to a family of railway workers. He graduated from Popilnia Secondary School in 1999.

He received his higher education at the Faculty of Economics of Taras Shevchenko National University of Kyiv, specializing in "Enterprise Economics".

== Business career ==
In 2000, Nahorniak began his entrepreneurial activities in the field of construction materials as a sole trader. He founded and managed three companies. Since 2011, he has served as the director of Euroinvestgroup LTD.

He annually attends the World Economic Forum in Davos and participates in professional and political conferences at the national and international levels.

== Political career ==
In the 2019 Ukrainian parliamentary election, Nahorniak ran as a candidate from the Servant of the People party in electoral district No. 199 (the city of Vatutine and parts of Zhaskiv, Zvenyhorodka, Mankivka, Lysianka, and Talne districts in Cherkasy Oblast). At the time of the election, he was the director of Euroinvestgroup LTD and non-partisan. He was elected as a People's Deputy of Ukraine of the 9th convocation.

He is a member of the Servant of the People parliamentary faction. In parliament, he serves on the Committee on Energy and Housing and Utility Services, heading the subcommittee on energy saving and energy efficiency.

Nahorniak chairs the inter-parliamentary friendship group "Ukraine—Kazakhstan". Together with Kazakh businessman Daulet Nurzhanov and the Kazakh diaspora, he implemented the "Yurt of Invincibility" project (heating points in case of blackouts; the first opened in Bucha in December 2022, the second in Shevchenko Park in Kyiv in January 2023).

== Personal life ==
Nahorniak has four daughters and one son.
