= Zelenyi Hai =

Zelenyi Hai (Ukrainian: Зелений Гай, meaning "green grove") may refer to several places in Ukraine:

== Cherkasy Oblast ==
- Zelenyi Hai, Cherkasy Oblast, a village in Uman Raion

== Chernihiv Oblast ==
- Zelenyi Hai, Novhorod-Siverskyi Raion, Chernihiv Oblast, a village in Novhorod-Siverskyi Raion
- Zelenyi Hai, Novhorod-Siverskyi Raion, Chernihiv Oblast (former), a former village in Novhorod-Siverskyi Raion
- Zelenyi Hai, Pryluky Raion, Chernihiv Oblast, a village in Pryluky Raion

== Chernivtsi Oblast ==
- Zelenyi Hai, Chernivtsi Oblast, a village in Chernivtsi Raion

== Dnipropetrovsk Oblast ==
- Zelenyi Hai, Dnipro Raion, Dnipropetrovsk Oblast, a village in Dnipro Raion
- Zelenyi Hai, Delvadove rural hromada, Kryvyi Rih Raion, Dnipropetrovsk Oblast, a village in Delvadove rural hromada, Kryvyi Rih Raion
- Zelenyi Hai, Karpivka rural hromada, Kryvyi Rih Raion, Dnipropetrovsk Oblast, a village in Karpivka rural hromada, Kryvyi Rih Raion
- Zelenyi Hai, Lozuvatka rural hromada, Kryvyi Rih Raion, Dnipropetrovsk Oblast, a village in Lozuvatka rural hromada, Kryvyi Rih Raion
- Zelenyi Hai, Nikopol Raion, Dnipropetrovsk Oblast, a village in Nikopol Raion
- Zelenyi Hai, Pavlohrad Raion, Dnipropetrovsk Oblast, a village in Pavlohrad Raion
- Zelenyi Hai, Bohunivka rural hromada, Synelnykove Raion, Dnipropetrovsk Oblast, a village in Bohunivka rural hromada, Synelnykove Raion
- Zelenyi Hai, Dubovyky rural hromada, Synelnykove Raion, Dnipropetrovsk Oblast, a village in Dubovyky rural hromada, Synelnykove Raion
- Zelenyi Hai, Ukrainske rural hromada, Synelnykove Raion, Dnipropetrovsk Oblast, a village in Ukrainske rural hromada, Synelnykove Raion
- Zelenyi Hai, Vasylkivka settlement hromada, Synelnykove Raion, Dnipropetrovsk Oblast, a village in Vasylkivka settlement hromada, Synelnykove Raion

== Donetsk Oblast ==
- Zelenyi Hai, Kalmiuske Raion, Donetsk Oblast, a village in Kalmiuske Raion
- Zelenyi Hai, Komar rural hromada, Volnovakha Raion, Donetsk Oblast, a rural settlement in Komar rural hromada, Volnovakha Raion
- Zelenyi Hai, Volnovakha urban hromada, Volnovakha Raion, Donetsk Oblast, a village in Volnovakha urban hromada, Volnovakha Raion

== Kherson Oblast ==
- Zelenyi Hai, Beryslav Raion, Kherson Oblast, a village in Beryslav Raion
- Zelenyi Hai, Henichesk Raion, Kherson Oblast, a village in Henichesk Raion
- Zelenyi Hai, Kherson Raion, Kherson Oblast, a village in Kherson Raion

== Kharkiv Oblast ==
- Zelenyi Hai, Izium Raion, Kharkiv Oblast, a village in Izium Raion
- Zelenyi Hai, Lozova Raion, Kharkiv Oblast, a village in Lozova Raion
- Zelenyi Hai, Kupiansk Raion, Kharkiv Oblast, a village in Kupiansk Raion

== Kirovohrad Oblast ==
- Zelenyi Hai, Adzhamka rural hromada, Kropyvnytskyi Raion, Kirovohrad Oblast, a village in Adzhamka rural hromada, Kropyvnytskyi Raion
- Zelenyi Hai, Hurivka rural hromada, Kropyvnytskyi Raion, Kirovohrad Oblast, a village in Hurivka rural hromada, Kropyvnytskyi Raion
- Zelenyi Hai, Subottsi rural hromada, Kropyvnytskyi Raion, Kirovohrad Oblast, a village in Subottsi rural hromada, Kropyvnytskyi Raion
- Zelenyi Hai, Petrove settlement hromada, Oleksandriia Raion, Kirovohrad Oblast, a village in Petrove settlement hromada, Oleksandriia Raion
- Zelenyi Hai, Popelnaste rural hromada, Oleksandriia Raion, Kirovohrad Oblast, a village in Popelnaste rural hromada, Oleksandriia Raion

== Luhansk Oblast ==
- Zelenyi Hai, Rovenky Raion, Luhansk Oblast, a village in Rovenky Raion
- Zelenyi Hai, Starobilsk Raion, Luhansk Oblast, a village in Starobilsk Raion

== Lviv Oblast ==
- Zelenyi Hai, Lviv Oblast, a village in Lviv Raion

== Mykolaiv Oblast ==
- Zelenyi Hai, Bashtanka urban hromada, Bashtanka Raion, Mykolaiv Oblast, a village in Bashtanka urban hromada, Bashtanka Raion
- Zelenyi Hai, Bereznehuvate Raion, Mykolaiv Oblast, a former village in Bereznehuvate Raion, currently Bashtanka Raion
- Zelenyi Hai, Pryvilne rural hromada, Bashtanka Raion, Mykolaiv Oblast, a village in Pryvilne rural hromada, Bashtanka Raion
- Zelenyi Hai, Shevchenkove rural hromada, Mykolaiv Raion, Mykolaiv Oblast, a village in Shevchenkove rural hromada, Mykolaiv Raion
- Zelenyi Hai, Stepove rural hromada, Mykolaiv Raion, Mykolaiv Oblast, a village in Stepove rural hromada, Mykolaiv Raion
- Zelenyi Hai, Voznesensk Raion, Mykolaiv Oblast, a village in Voznesensk Raion

== Odesa Oblast ==
- Zelenyi Hai, Odesa Oblast, a village in Podilsk Raion

== Rivne Oblast ==
- Zelenyi Hai, Rivne Oblast, a village in Dubno Raion

== Sumy Oblast ==
- Zelenyi Hai, Romny Raion, Sumy Oblast, a village in Romny Raion
- Zelenyi Hai, Lebedyn urban hromada, Sumy Raion, Sumy Oblast, a village in Lebedyn urban Hromada, Sumy Raion
- Zelenyi Hai, Sumy urban hromada, Sumy Raion, Sumy Oblast, a village in Sumy urban hromada, Sumy Raion

== Ternopil Oblast ==
- Zelenyi Hai, Ternopil Oblast, a village in Chortkiv Raion

== Zaporizhzhia Oblast ==
- Zelenyi Hai, Melitopol Raion, Zaporizhzhia Oblast, a village in Melitopol Raion
- Zelenyi Hai, Huliaipole urban hromada, Polohy Raion, Zaporizhzhia Oblast, a village in Polohy Raion
- Zelenyi Hai, Smyrnove rural hromada, Polohy Raion, Zaporizhzhia Oblast, a village in Polohy Raion
- Zelenyi Hai, Rozdol rural hromada, Vasylivka Raion, Zaporizhzhia Oblast, a village in Vasylivka Raion
- Zelenyi Hai, Vasylivka urban hromada, Vasylivka Raion, Zaporizhzhia Oblast, a village in Vasylivka Raion
- Zelenyi Hai, Zaporizhzhia Raion, Zaporizhzhia Oblast, a village in Zaporizhzhia Raion

== Zhytomyr Oblast ==
- Zelenyi Hai, Korosten Raion, Zhytomyr Oblast, a village in Korosten Raion
- Zelenyi Hai, Zhytomyr Raion, Zhytomyr Oblast, a village in Zhytomyr Raion
- Zelenyi Hai, Zviahel Raion, Zhytomyr Oblast, village in Zviahel Raion
