= Katerynopil Raion =

Former subdivision of Cherkasy Oblast, Ukraine

Katerynopil Raion Катеринопільський район
- Raion
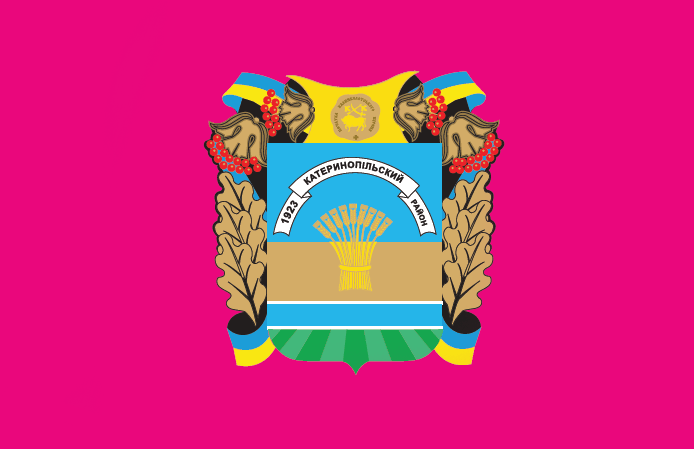
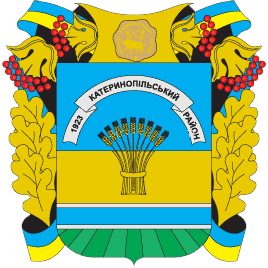
- Flag Coat of arms

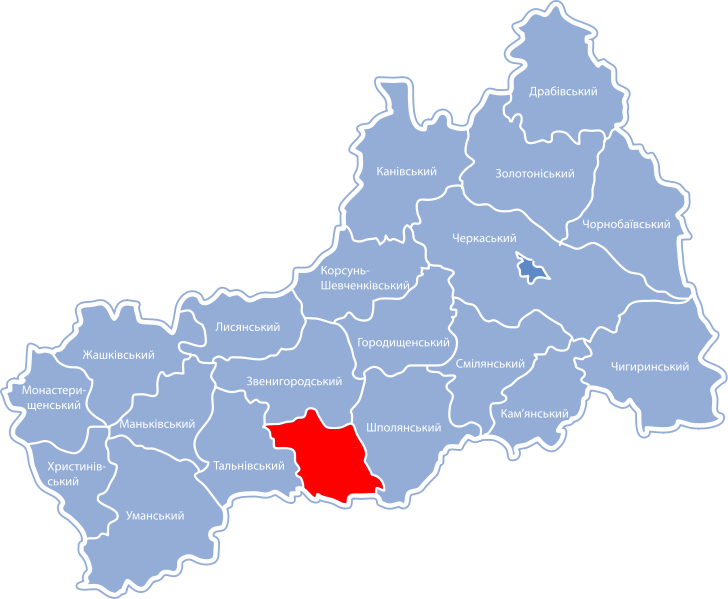
- Raion location in Cherkasy Oblast
- Coordinates: 48°52′4.1″N 31°4′5.8″E
- Country: Ukraine
- Province: Cherkasy Oblast
- Disestablished: 18 July 2020
- Admin. center: Katerynopil

Area
  - Total: 725 km^{2} (280 sq mi)

Population (2020)
  - Total: 23,093
  - Density: 31.9/km^{2} (82.5/sq mi)
- Time zone: UTC+2 (EET)
  - Summer (DST): UTC+3 (EEST)
- Postal code: 20500—20545
- Area code: +380 4742

Katerynopil Raion (Ukrainian: Катеринопільський район) was a raion (district) of Cherkasy Oblast in central Ukraine. Its administrative center was located at the urban-type settlement of Katerynopil. The raion covered an area of 672.2 square kilometres (259.5 mi^{2}). The raion was abolished on 18 July 2020 as part of the administrative reform of Ukraine, which reduced the number of raions of Cherkasy Oblast to four. The area of Chornobai Raion was merged into Zvenyhorodka Raion. The last estimate of the raion population was 23,093 (2020 est.)

At the time of disestablishment, the raion consisted of three hromadas:

- Katerynopil settlement hromada with the administration in Katerynopil;
- Mokra Kalyhirka rural hromada with the administration in the selo of Mokra Kalyhirka;
- Yerky settlement hromada with the administration in the urban-type settlement of Yerky.

== People from Katerynopil Raion ==
- Semen Hryzlo (1887), Ukrainian military and civil activist, organizer of the Free Cossacks.
- Viacheslav Chornovil, Ukrainian politician, earlier a prominent Ukrainian dissident to the Soviet policies
