= Marianivka =

Marianivka (Ukrainian: Мар'янівка) may refer to several places in Ukraine:

== Urban-type settlements ==
- Marianivka, Marianivka settlement hromada, Lutsk Raion, Volyn Oblast
- Marianivka, Zviahel Raion, Zhytomyr Oblast

== Villages ==
- Marianivka, Zolotonosha Raion, Cherkasy Oblast, village in Zolotonosha Raion
- Marianivka, Shpola urban hromada, Zvenyhorodka Raion, Cherkasy Oblast, village in Zvenyhorodka Raion
- Marianivka, Bila Tserkva Raion, Kyiv Oblast
- Maryanivka (formerly Ubizhyshche), Lubny Raion, Poltava Oblast
- Marianivka, Kakhovka Raion, Kherson Oblast

== Rural settlements ==
- Marianivka, Vynohrad rural hromada, Zvenyhorodka Raion, Cherkasy Oblast, rural settlement in Zvenyhorodka Raion
