= Andrey Skoromnyy =

Russian bodybuilder (born 1989)

Andrey Skoromnyy Андре́й Скоро́мный
- Professional bodybuilder
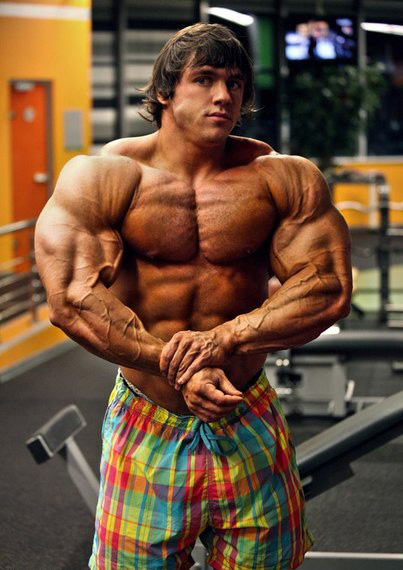
- Skoromnyy posing in 2012

Personal info
- Full name: Skoromnyy Andrey Mikhaylovich
- Born: 30 June 1989 (age 36); Yerky, Cherkasy Oblast, Ukraine

Best statistics
- Height: 5 ft 8.5 in (1.74 m)
- Weight: Contest: 220.5 lb (100 kg); Off season: 260.1 lb (118 kg)

Professional (Pro) career
- Pro-debut: Arnold Amateur (IFBB); 2013
- Best win: Russian Championship (FBFR); 2013
- Active: 2010–present

Andrey Mikhaylovich Skoromnyy (Russian: Андре́й Миха́йлович Скоро́мный; born 30 June 1989 in Yerky, Cherkasy Oblast, USSR) is a Russian athlete, Master of Sports of Russia in bodybuilding.

== Biography ==
Andrey Mikhaylovich Skoromnyy was born on 30 June 1989 in Cherkasy Oblast in the Ukrainian SSR. Andrey spent his childhood and school years in the north of Russia, in the village Purpe of Yamalo-Nenets Autonomous Okrug.

At school, Andrey stood out for his love for the sport. In the mornings before the lessons started he regularly used to jog, he also did various sports, and represented his school in different sport events and competitions. Before bodybuilding became his passion, Andrey had already had several senior degrees in such sports as athletics, gymnastics, and basketball.

In 2006, Andrey Skoromnyy graduated from high school and moved to Moscow to study. At the age of 17, Andrey began attending the nearby weightlifting club and became extremely interested in bodybuilding. His initial weight was about 65 kg when he started weight training.

Yoshkar-Ola Championship held in the spring of 2010 became the first bodybuilding competition for Andrey. On it the debutant participated in the junior category and in the final standing confidently took the first place. After that Andrey was asked to compete for bodyweight category for men "up to 90kg". As a result, he won a bronze medal.

At all-Russian tournament on bodybuilding held the same spring, Andrey won in the category "juniors over 75 kg" category and got the first place in absolute junior standing. In the make "up to 90 kg" category Andrey trailed only to Sergei Kopantsev and Vadim Solonchak, who took first and second places respectively. In autumn 2010, in the championship of Moscow region he got again the first place in absolute standing among the juniors, and again the third place in the category for men, but "up to 100 kg"category. He had the same result in the Moscow city championship (the first place in absolute standing among the juniors). This time, due to leaner muscles, Andrey took second place in the "up to 90 kg" category by edging out bronze medalist Ivan Kochetkov. He finished behind Ivan Vodianov.

Andrey Skoromnyy completed autumn contest participating in all-Russian tournament, where he won his category of "juniors over 75 kg" as well as the absolute standings, and became the champion of Russia. Unfortunately, he couldn't compete in the World Championship. A simple cold led to a complicated ear disease. Therefore, 17 days before the announced date Andrey was taken to hospital and was forced to stop precompetitive preparation.

Having missed the spring competitive season, in October 2011 at the Open Championship and Cup of Moscow, after leaving the junior division Andrey Skoromnyy got first place in the category for "men up to 100 kg". In absolute standings he was second after a heavy-weight champion Vitaliy Fateev, having beaten the winners of other weight categories: Sergey Doronichev (up to 85 kg), Pavel Ivanov (up to 90 kg), and Pavel Goncharov (up to 80 kg). He graduated from Moscow Automobile and Road Construction State Technical University, Faculty of Road Transport. While studying at the university, he worked as a personal trainer in the fitness centre.

On his trainings Andrey Skoromnyy follows his intuition. And in the off-season and before contests he does high-volume workouts, he works with each muscle group once every 7 days. He usually trains either three days on/one day off or two days on/one day off. He doesn't train the abdominal and calf muscles in the off-season. He does a 20-minute cardiovascular exercise after strength training. While "cutting" he is on the carbohydrate-free diet and compensates the lack of calories with plenty of protein. Andrey trains in Lyubertsy.

In the beginning of a pretty successful competitive career Andrey trained individually. But later he confessed that due to a lack of knowledge of competitive training and he asked for help from Aleksey V. Kireev ("Dr. Luber"). The first results of their fruitful cooperation became the nearest achievements of 2010 autumn season.

== Personal life ==
Wife Arina Skoromnaya (date of birth 27 March 1988). Arina and Andrey have daughter (born 12 April 2014).

== Anthropometric data ==
Anthropometric data (measurements)

- height – 174см
- weight:
  - contest — 98 kg,
  - off season — 118 kg,
- waist — 85 см
- neck — 45 см
- biceps — 55 см,
- thigh — 71 см
- shin — 50 см

== Achievements ==
Andrey Skoromnyy participated in the following bodybuilding contests:

=== 2010 ===
Moscow Cup:

- juniors, absolute standing, 1st place
- for men "up to 90 kg", 3rd place

Central Federal District Cup:

- juniors, absolute standing, 1st place
- for men "up to 90 kg", 4th place

Russian Cup (FBFR):

- juniors over 75 kg, 1st place
- juniors, absolute standing, 1st place
- for men "up to 90 kg", 3rd place

Championship of Moscow region:

- juniors, absolute standing, 1st place
- for men "up to 100 kg", 3rd place

Moscow Championship:

- juniors, absolute standing, 1st place
- for men "up to 90 kg", 2nd place

Russian Championship (FBFR):

- juniors "over 75 kg", 1st place
- juniors, absolute standing, 1st place
- for men "up to 90 kg", 5th place

=== 2011 ===
Moscow Championship:

- for men "up to 100 kg", 1st place
- male absolute standing, 2nd place

=== 2012 ===
Russian Championship (FBFR):

- for men "up to 100 kg", 2nd place

Champions Cup:

- male absolute standing, 5th place

Grand Prix Fitness House:

- male absolute standing, 4th place

=== 2013 ===
Arnold Amateur (IFBB):

- Men up to 100 kg, was not included in the 6 winners (other places are not mentioned in IFBB record)

Russian Championship (FBFR):

- for men "up to 100 kg", 2nd place.
