= Lebedyn, Cherkasy Oblast =

Village in Cherkasy Oblast, Ukraine

Lebedyn Лебедин
- Village
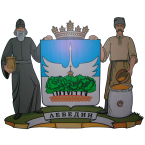
- Coat of arms

- Location within Ukraine Location within Cherkasy Oblast
- Coordinates: 48°57′51″N 31°31′21″E
- Country: Ukraine
- Oblast: Cherkasy Oblast
- District: Zvenyhorodka Raion
- First mentioned: before 15th century

Population
  - Total: 3,467
- Time zone: UTC+02:00 (EET)
  - Summer (DST): UTC+03:00 (EEST)
- Postal index: 20634
- Area code: +380 4741
- Website: http://lebedyn.selo.org.ua/

Lebedyn (Ukrainian: Лебедин) is a village in Zvenyhorodka Raion of Cherkasy Oblast (province) of central Ukraine. It belongs to Shpola urban hromada, one of the hromadas of Ukraine. Population: 3467.

Sometimes in the 15th century the village was completely wiped out by Tatar hordes. The new village appeared around the St George monastery after 17th century, while the monastery itself appeared in the place of the previous settlement sometime in 16th century. The original residents resettled in Sloboda Ukraine where they established another Lebedyn which now is a city in Sumy Oblast.

The Lebedyn monastery was one of four the most important monasteries of Ukrainian Cossacks along with Trakhtemyriv monastery, Mezhyhirya Monastery, and Motrynyn monastery.

Until 18 July 2020, Lebedyn belonged to Shpola Raion. The raion was abolished in July 2020 as part of the administrative reform of Ukraine, which reduced the number of raions of Cherkasy Oblast to four. The area of Shpola Raion was merged into Zvenyhorodka Raion.
