= Brodetske =

Brodetske (Ukrainian: Бродецьке) may refer to the following places in Ukraine:

- Brodetske, Cherkasy Oblast, village in Zvenyhorodka Raion
- Brodetske, Vinnytsia Oblast, urban-type settlement in Khmilnyk Raion
