= Heorhiivka, Cherkasy Oblast =

Village in Cherkasy Oblast, Ukraine

Heorhiivka Георгіївка
- Location of Heorhiivka Heorhiivka (Ukraine)
- Coordinates: 49°01′02″N 31°13′13″E
- Country: Ukraine
- Oblast: Cherkasy Oblast
- Raion: Zvenyhorodka Raion
- Elevation: 186 m (610 ft)

Population (2001)
  - Total: 213
- Postal code: 20623
- Area code: +380 4741
- Climate: Cfa

Heorhiivka (Ukrainian: Георгіївка) is a village in Zvenyhorodka Raion, Cherkasy Oblast (province) of Ukraine.

Heorhiivka was previously located in the Shpola Raion. The raion was abolished on 18 July 2020 as part of the administrative reform of Ukraine, which reduced the number of raions of Cherkasy Oblast to four. The area of Shpola Raion was merged into Zvenyhorodka Raion.
