= Marianivka, Vynohrad rural hromada, Zvenyhorodka Raion, Cherkasy Oblast =

Rural settlement in Cherkasy Oblast, Ukraine

Marianivka Мар'я́нівка
- Rural settlement
- Location of Marianivka Marianivka (Ukraine)
- Coordinates: 49°11′23″N 30°29′48″E
- Country: Ukraine
- Oblast: Cherkasy Oblast
- Raion: Zvenyhorodka Raion
- Hromada: Vynohrad rural hromada
- Elevation: 146 m (479 ft)

Population (2001)
  - Total: 433
- Postal code: 19344
- Climate: Cfa

Marianivka (Ukrainian: Мар'я́нівка) is a rural settlement in Zvenyhorodka Raion, Cherkasy Oblast, Ukraine. It belongs to Vynohrad rural hromada, one of the hromadas of Ukraine.

Until 18 July 2020, Marianivka was previously located in the Lysianka Raion. The raion was abolished in July 2020 as part of the administrative reform of Ukraine, which reduced the number of raions of Cherkasy Oblast to four. The area of Lysianka Raion was merged into Zvenyhorodka Raion.
