= Ozeryshche =

Ozerische - the place-name:

== Localities ==
=== Belarus ===
- Ozerische - a village in the Chechersk district of Gomel region.
- Ozerische - a village in Osipovichi district of Mogilev region.
- Ozerische - village, which is part of Minsk

=== Russia ===
- Ozerische - a village in Zhukovsky district of the Bryansk region.
- Ozerische - a village in the Bryansk region Zlynkovsky District.
- Ozerische - in the village of Pochep area of the Bryansk region.
- Ozerische - in the village of Starodubsky area of the Bryansk region.
- Ozerische - a village in Dorogobuzh district of Smolensk region.
- Ozerische - a village in the Smolensk region Smolensk region.

=== Ukraine ===
- Ozeryshche - а village in Cherkasy Raion of Cherkasy Oblast.

== Other ==
- Ozerische - railway station in Minsk.

== See also ==
- Ozerischenskoe rural settlement
- Ozeritsy
- Ponds
- Ozerschina
