= Lysianka =

Rural locality in Cherkasy Oblast, Ukraine

Lysianka Лисянка
- Rural settlement
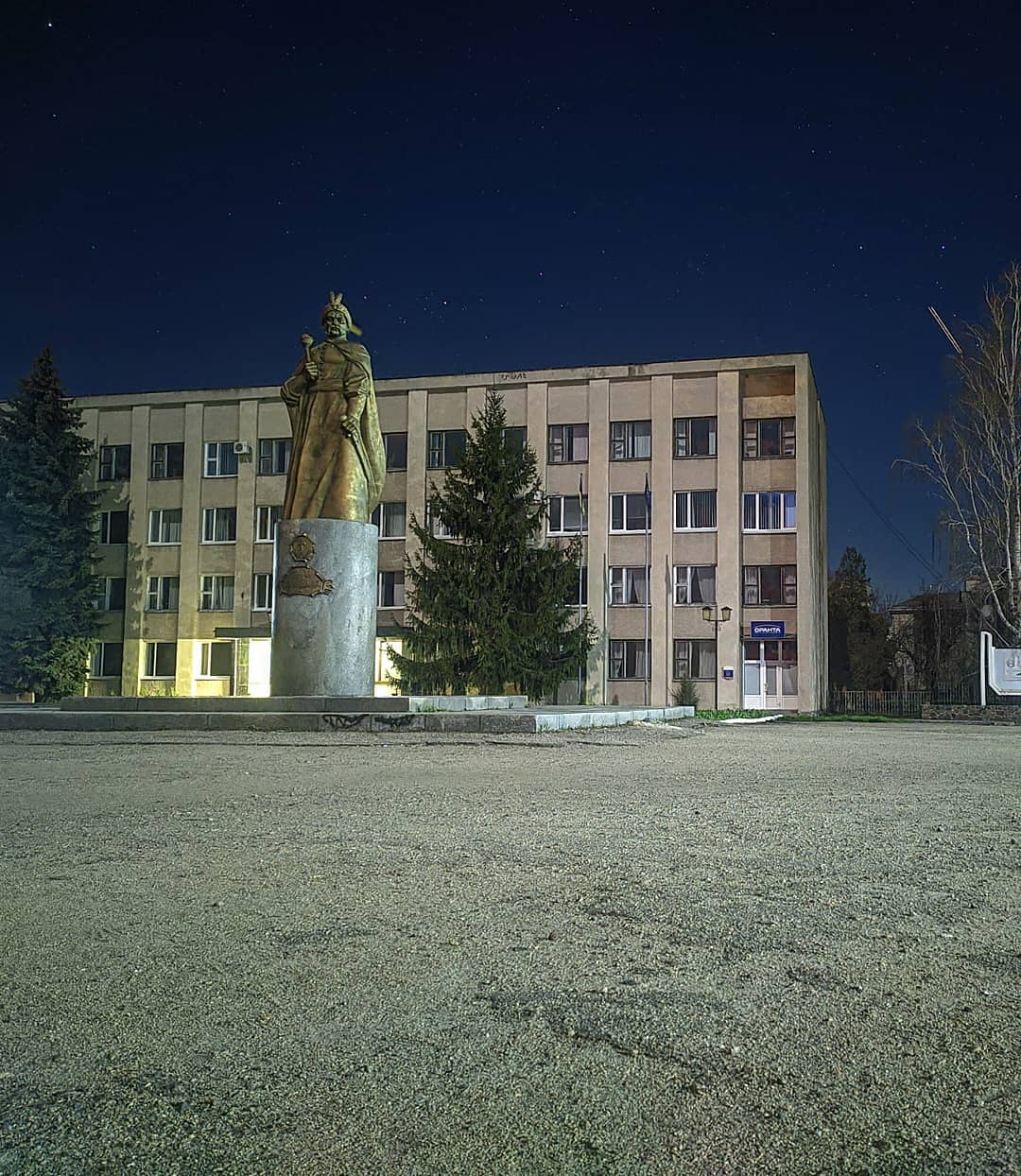
- Monument to Bohdan Khmelnytsky

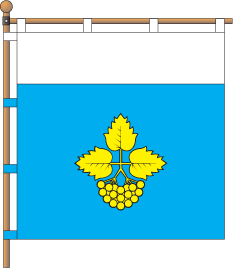
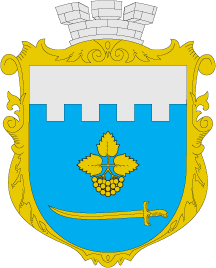
- Flag Coat of arms

- Location of Lysianka in Ukraine Lysianka (Ukraine)
- Coordinates: 49°15′25″N 30°49′24″E
- Country: Ukraine
- Oblast: Cherkasy Oblast
- Raion: Zvenyhorodka Raion
- First mentioned: 1593
- Town status: 1965

Government
  - Town Head: Tamara Hnatenko
- Elevation: 160 m (520 ft)

Population (2022)
  - Total: 7,398
- Time zone: UTC+2 (EET)
  - Summer (DST): UTC+3 (EEST)
- Postal code: 19300
- Area code: +380 4749
- Website: http://lysyanskarada.ck.ua/

Lysianka (Ukrainian: Лисянка) is a rural settlement in Zvenyhorodka Raion, Cherkasy Oblast, central Ukraine. It hosts the administration of Lysianka settlement hromada, one of the hromadas of Ukraine. Population: 7,398 (2022 estimate).

== History ==
In 1944, the IS-1 heavy tank saw its debut at the town. 5 were knocked out by Panthers.

Until 18 July 2020, Lysianka served as an administrative center of Lysianka Raion. The raion was abolished in July 2020 as part of the administrative reform of Ukraine, which reduced the number of raions of Cherkasy Oblast to four. The area of Lysianka Raion was merged into Zvenyhorodka Raion.

Until 26 January 2024, Lysianka was designated urban-type settlement. On this day, a new law entered into force which abolished this status, and Lysianka became a rural settlement.

== Notable residents ==
- Jan Śleszyński (1854–1931), Polish-Russian mathematician
