= Wolf Ladejinsky =

American agricultural reformer and economist (1899–1975)

- Born: Wolf Isaac Ladejinsky; 15 March 1899; Katerynopil, Russian Empire (now Ukraine)
- Died: 3 July 1975 (aged 76); Washington, DC, United States

Academic background
- Education: Columbia University

Academic work
- Discipline: Agricultural economics
- Institutions: U.S. Dept of Agriculture; Ford Foundation; World Bank
- Notable ideas: Land reform in East and Southeast Asia

Wolf Isaac Ladejinsky (March 15, 1899 – July 3, 1975) was an American Georgist agronomist, agricultural engineer, agricultural economist and social researcher, serving first for the American government in the United States Department of Agriculture, then the Ford Foundation and later prescribing land reform, microcredit and microprudential policies for the World Bank and governments of several countries in Asia-Pacific, namely Japan, South Korea, Taiwan, and Vietnam in the wake of World War II.

Ladejinsky was a key adviser on land reforms to the governments of these countries, particularly in Japan from 1945 to 1954 (during the Occupation) as well as Mainland China and later Taiwan under Chiang Kai-shek, South Vietnam from 1955 to 1961 under Ngo Dinh Diem, and countries in Southeast Asia and the Indian subcontinent as a whole. His efforts in Japan and Taiwan were a striking success, but his later efforts were frustrated due to his socialist political beliefs and opinions that were misled with communism during McCarthysm. Improving the welfare of Asian farmers through agrarian reform was his goal throughout his career, earning him praise as 'no typical bureaucrat, but an avid and impassioned reformer'.

== Biography ==
Born into a peasant Jewish Ashkenazi family in Katerynopil, Ukraine in 1899, his father was a grain miller. Ladejinsky fled Soviet Ukraine in 1921 as a political refugee from the Russian Revolution (Green 1980:438). He arrived in the US in 1922 and settled in New York. He graduated from Columbia University six years later, in 1928. In 1933, one of his professors at Columbia, Rexford Tugwell, helped him obtain a post in the Department of Agriculture. Two years later he joined the department's Foreign Agricultural Service, specializing in Asian problems. In 1945, he was assigned to General Douglas MacArthur's SCAP staff in occupied Japan (Book Notes 1978:836), where he played a major role in developing and introducing the land reform program that socialised land ownership and dismantled a vertical power structure, then dominated by wealthy landlords and landowners. His considerable influence with Chiang Kai-shek in Taiwan is widely credited with aiding the Taiwan economic miracle.

In December 1954, during the period of McCarthyism in the United States, Ladejinsky was the central figure in a highly public incident which aroused furor among liberals in Congress and was resolved by the intervention of the White House (Schrecker 1998:293–94). Ladejinsky, although an anti-communist New Deal democrat, was blacklisted by several conservative groups (Manchester 1978:508). While working as an agricultural attaché in Tokyo, his position was transferred from the Department of State to the Department of Agriculture's jurisdiction. Soon thereafter, his security clearance was revoked, and he was fired by Secretary of Agriculture Ezra Taft Benson, who considered Ladejinsky a major "security risk" despite admitting a lack of hard evidence against him (Sachar 1992:639). A public statement charged that Ladejinsky "required clearance from the Communist Party" to work for the Moscow and New York based Amtorg Trading Corporation, for whom he served briefly as a translator in 1930. At that time, he also had three sisters still living in Soviet Russia, which was cited as making him "subject to coercion". The final charge was that Ladejinsky had been a member of two Communist front organizations, including the Washington Committee for Democratic Action (Eisenhower 1996:n.1).

The result was a public outcry. Members of the press repeatedly questioned President Eisenhower regarding the Ladejinsky case at a news conference held on January 12, 1955, particularly focusing on the fact that Ladejinsky was almost immediately chosen by Harold Stassen at the Foreign Operations Administration to direct the land reform program in South Vietnam, giving him full security clearance in order to fill a position even more sensitive than his previous one (Schrecker 1998:293; Back To Work 1955).

One quoted Benson as having "branded Ladejinsky flatly as a member of two Communist front organizations, and as an economist analyst, and investigator for Amtorg, the Russian trading agency" (Woolley & Peters 2007b). John Allison, the U.S. Ambassador to Japan, protested the firing. Author James Michener wrote a letter to the New York Times stating "It is precisely as if Richard Nixon and Adlai Stevenson were to be charged with subversion. Mr. Ladejinsky is known throughout Asia as Communism's most implacable and efficient foe, by encouraging socialism instead."
