= Bahacheve urban hromada =

Urban hromada of Cherkasy Oblast, Ukraine

Coordinates: 49°00′00″N 31°06′43″E

Bahacheve urban hromada Багачевська міська громада
- Hromada
- Country: Ukraine
- Oblast: Cherkasy Oblast
- Raion: Zvenyhorodka Raion

Area
  - Total: 111.9 km^{2} (43.2 sq mi)

Population (2025)
  - Total: 20,125
  - Density: 179.8/km^{2} (465.8/sq mi)
- Settlements: 5
- Cities: 1
- Villages: 4
- Website: vatutine-gromada.gov.ua

Bahacheve urban hromada (Ukrainian: Багачевська міська територіальна громада, romanized: Bahachevska miska terytorialna hromada), is one of the hromadas of Ukraine, in Zvenyhorodka Raion within Cherkasy Oblast. Its administrative centre is the city of Bahacheve.

On November 26, 2025 Vatutine urban hromada was renamed to Bahacheve urban hromada due to renaming of administrative center.

== Composition ==
In addition to one city (Bahacheve), the hromada contains 4 villages:

- Chychyrkozivka
- Skalyvatka
- Stetsivka
- Yurkivka

== Population ==
As of 01.01.2024 the population of hromada was 20125 (men - 8951, women - 11174)

The population of hromada splits into:

- Skalyvatka – 621;
- Yurkivka 2342;
- Stetsivka 1404;
- Chychyrkozivka 513;
- Bahacheve 15245.

=== Vulnerable social groups (2024) ===
- Internally displaced persons (IDPs): 3,237
- People with disabilities: 436
- People living with HIV: 68
- ATO veterans: 117
- Large families: 118 families with 395 children
- Children deprived of parental care: 21
- Elderly persons (60+) living alone: 624

== Infrastructure ==
=== Medical Facilities ===
The hromada is served by a network of 13 pharmacies, one hospital, and three outpatient clinics (ambulatories).

=== Education ===
The hromada has a well-developed educational infrastructure, comprising six kindergartens, five elementary schools, five middle schools, and two high schools. It is also home to a Multidisciplinary Regional Center for Vocational Education - website.

=== Utilities ===
- All settlements connected by paved roads
- Natural gas is available in all settlements
- Mixed water supply: some areas have centralized systems, others rely on wells
- Centralized heating in Bahacheve city; other areas use individual systems

=== Internet & Telecom ===
Internet and Communication All localities (except Chychyrkozivka with weaker signal) have access to mobile and broadband internet (Kyivstar, Vodafone, Lifecell, Maklaut, Ukrtelecom)

Public Wi-Fi is available in several libraries and public institutions

=== Market and commercial activity ===
- 65 grocery stores
- 45 non-food stores
- 35 service providers (e.g. salons, repairs)

=== Civil Society and NGOs ===
- Veterans’ organizations (e.g. Afghan War Veterans Union)
- Social protection NGOs (e.g. “Children of Chornobyl”, “Territory of Revival”)
- Sports clubs (football, boxing, karate)
- Youth and psychological support initiatives

=== Cultural Life and Services ===
- Libraries: 3 with internet access (2 offer free Wi-Fi)
- Restaurants/Cafes: 8 operating in Bahacheve, including “Hirnyk”, “Wasabi Sushi”, “Zolotyi Kliuchyk”
- Postal Services: Available in all major settlements, including Nova Poshta

== Notable people ==
The following individuals have been recognized as honorary citizens of Bahacheve urban hromada (formerly Vatutine city) for their contributions in various fields:

Oleh Volodymyrovych Zahliadov (born 2024) – Private entrepreneur.

Honorary citizens of Vatutine city (prior to renaming):

- Oleksii Hryhorovych Bilous (1926–1999) – Miner, Hero of Socialist Labor, World War II veteran.
- Iraklii Volodymyrovych Kakiashvili (1924–2002) – Miner, recipient of multiple state honors.
- Olena Fedorivna Hovorova (1917–2002) – Sister of General M.F. Vatutin, labor veteran.
- Dmytro Danylovych Vovchenko (1916–2006) – City builder, awarded for contributions to municipal development.
- Yevhen Tymofiiovych Oliinychenko (1931–2002) – Head of the Vatutine City Executive Committee (1969–1980).
- Mykola Zinoviiovych Cheburakhin (1927–2020) – Traumatologist, recipient of the Order of Merit (III class).
- Leonid Hryhorovych Avramenko (1940–2013) – Mining engineer, director of Vatutine mine management.
- Matvii Hryhorovych Bohomolkin (1922–2009) – WWII veteran, Komsomol organizer.
- Volodymyr Petrovych Balaba (1949–2014) – General director of the refractory plant, Honored Industrial Worker of Ukraine.
- Oleksii Filimonovych Zaika (1926–2004) – WWII veteran, director of Secondary School No. 1 for over 30 years.
- Nina Hryhorivna Beiler (born 1947) – Head of Vatutine meat-processing plant, Honored Industrial Worker of Ukraine.
- Margarita Andriivna Lamanova (1921–2007) – WWII veteran, executive committee head (1965–1969).
- Vasyl Ostapovych Horovyi (1926–2010) – Excavator operator, WWII veteran.
- Vitalii Ivanovych Dubinin (1932–2014) – Excavator operator, deputy of the USSR Supreme Soviet (1962–1974).
- Oleksandr Vasylovych Hovorov (born 1931) – Director of the M.F. Vatutin Museum (Russia).
- Ivan Havrylovych Yaremenko (born 1946) – Chairman of the board of ATP 2362, Honored Worker of Automotive Transport.
- Oleksandr Mykolaiovych Tkachenko (1939–2024) – Academician, Hero of Socialist Labor, Chairman of the Verkhovna Rada (1998–2001).
- Mariia Hryhorivna Dovbush (1950–2021) – Honored Teacher of Ukraine, educator at Secondary School No. 5.
- Mykhailo Stepanovych Panzuk (born 1949) – Honored Cultural Worker of Ukraine, artistic director of the "Uholok" orchestra.
- Raisa Mykolaivna Boiko (born 1938) – Honored Teacher of the Ukrainian SSR.
- Ihor Valentynovych Mykhailov (1945–2022) – Director of the city stadium "Shakhtar".
