= Kalynopil =

Rural locality in Cherkasy Oblast, Ukraine

Kalynopil Калинопіль
- Rural settlement
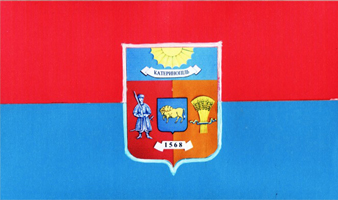
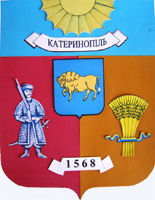
- Flag Coat of arms

- Location of Kalynopil in Cherkasy Oblast Kalynopil (Ukraine)
- Coordinates: 48°56′06″N 30°58′52″E
- Country: Ukraine
- Oblast: Cherkasy Oblast
- Raion: Zvenyhorodka Raion
- Hromada: Kalynopil settlement hromada
- Magdeburg rights: 1568
- Town status: 1965

Government
  - Town Head: Serhiy Dymchuk
- Elevation: 139 m (456 ft)

Population (2022)
  - Total: 5,243
- Time zone: UTC+2 (EET)
  - Summer (DST): UTC+3 (EEST)
- Postal code: 20500
- Area code: +380 4742

Kalynopil (Ukrainian: Калинопіль), formerly known as Katerynopil (Ukrainian: Катеринопіль) is a rural settlement located on the Hnylyi Tikych river in Zvenyhorodka Raion, Cherkasy Oblast, central Ukraine. It hosts the administration of Katerynopil settlement hromada, one of the hromadas of Ukraine. Population: 5,243 (2022 estimate).

== History ==
Archaeologists have found remains of the ancient Trypillya culture on the territory of Katerynopil. Until 1795 it was a village and later a miasteczko of Kalnebłota, Kalnebłoto (Ukrainian: Калниболото, romanized: Kalnyboloto). During the Khmelnytsky Uprising in 1648–1654, Kalnyboloto was a sotnia town of the Korsun Regiment.

After parts of Poland were incorporated into the Russian Empire, in 1797 the town was renamed Yekaterinopol (Russian: Екатеринополь, Ukrainian: Катеринопіль, romanized: Katerynopil) after the Russian tsarina Catherine the Great. On March 5, 1923, Katerynopil was given the status of an administrative center of its surrounding district.

Until 18 July 2020, Katerynopil served as an administrative center of Katerynopil Raion. The raion was abolished in July 2020 as part of the administrative reform of Ukraine, which reduced the number of raions of Cherkasy Oblast to four. The area of Katerynopil Raion was merged into Zvenyhorodka Raion.

Until 26 January 2024, Katerynopil was designated urban-type settlement. On this day, a new law entered into force which abolished this status, and Katerynopil became a rural settlement.

On April 3, 2024, the Committee on the Organization of State Power, Local Self-government, Regional Development, and Urban Planning in the Verkhovna Rada stated their support for renaming the settlement to Kalynopil (Калинопіль). On 19 September 2024, the Verkhovna Rada voted to rename Katerynopil to Kalynopil.

== Notable people ==
- Semen Hryzlo (c. 1887–1921), Ukrainian military and civil activist, organizer of the Free Cossacks
- Wolf Ladejinsky (1899–1975), a prominent American economist, mastermind of the land reform of 1946 in Japan
- Yuriy Kosiuk (born 1968), Ukrainian billionaire, CEO of MHP
