= Marianivka, Shpola urban hromada, Zvenyhorodka Raion, Cherkasy Oblast =

Village in Cherkasy Oblast, Ukraine

Marianivka Мар'я́нівка
- Location of Marianivka Marianivka (Ukraine)
- Coordinates: 49°01′04″N 31°28′15″E
- Country: Ukraine
- Oblast: Cherkasy Oblast
- Raion: Zvenyhorodka Raion
- Hromada: Shpola urban hromada
- Elevation: 146 m (479 ft)

Population (2024)
  - Total: 948
- Postal code: 20633
- Climate: Cfa

Marianivka (Ukrainian: Мар'я́нівка) is a village in Zvenyhorodka Raion, Cherkasy Oblast (province) of Ukraine. It belongs to Shpola urban hromada, one of the hromadas of Ukraine. The geographical center of Ukraine is located on the northern outskirts of the village. The distance to Zvenyhorodka is about 41 km (25 mi) and is on Highway H16.

== Geography ==
The river Marianivka flows through the village. Since 2005, the geographical centre of Ukraine is located in the northeastern outskirts of Marianivka.

== History ==
In 1885, 2,400 people lived in Marianivka, then located in Shpola Volost, Zvenigorod Uyezd, Kiev Governorate, there were 404 farmsteads, there was an Orthodox church, 3 inns, a shop and 13 windmills. According to the 1897 census, the population grew to 1,508 (749 males and 759 females), of whom 1,508 were Orthodox.

Marianivka was previously located in the Shpola Raion. The raion was abolished on 18 July 2020 as part of the administrative reform of Ukraine, which reduced the number of raions of Cherkasy Oblast to four. The area of Shpola Raion was merged into Zvenyhorodka Raion.

On 23 August 2021, on the Day of the National Flag, the Ukrainian flag was raised in the village. The ceremony was attended by President Volodymyr Zelenskyy. On the occasion of the Day of the National Flag in Marianivka and the 30th anniversary of Independence of Ukraine, the art complex "Geographical Center - the Heart of Ukraine" was created.
