= Shpola =

City in Cherkasy Oblast, Ukraine

Shpola Шпола
- City
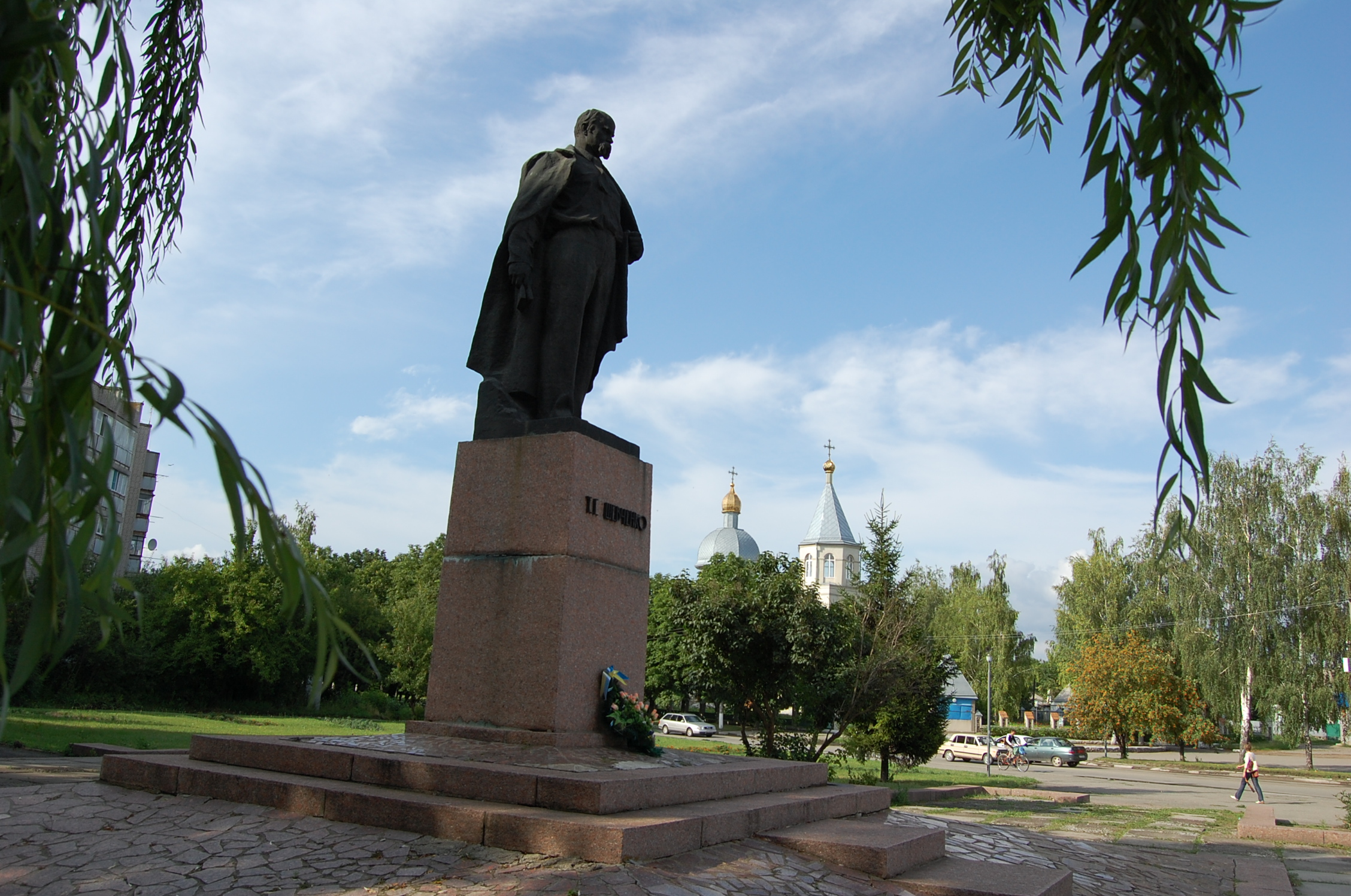
- Taras Shevchenko monument

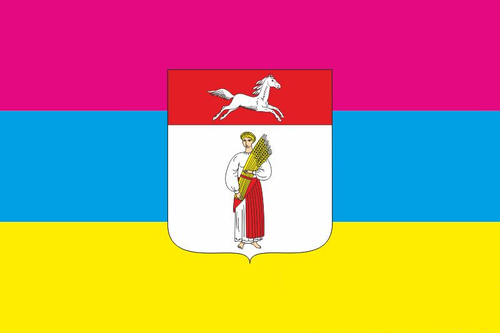
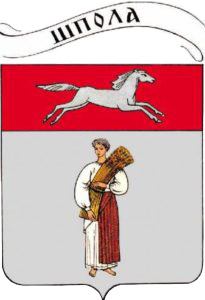
- Flag Coat of arms

- Location of Shpola Shpola (Ukraine)
- Coordinates: 48°59′59″N 31°23′32″E
- Country: Ukraine
- Oblast: Cherkasy Oblast
- Raion: Zvenyhorodka Raion
- Hromada: Shpola urban hromada
- First mentioned: 1594
- City rights: 1938

Government
  - Mayor: Sergiy Kravchenko (since 2015)

Area
  - Total: 61.29 km^{2} (23.66 sq mi)

Population (2022)
  - Total: 16,323
- Postal code: 20600—20609
- Area code: +380 4741

Shpola (Ukrainian: Шпола [ˈʃpɔlɐ]) is a city located in Zvenyhorodka Raion of Cherkasy Oblast (province) in central Ukraine. In May 2011, a 14-meter monument was installed on the outskirts of the city, claiming that Shpola is the geographical center of Ukraine. It hosts the administration of Shpola urban hromada, one of the hromadas of Ukraine. It had a population of 16,323 (2022 estimate).

== Administrative status ==
In 1797, Shpola became part of the Zvenigorod district in the Kiev Governorate. It has been a city since 1938. Until 18 July 2020, Shpola served as an administrative center of Shpola Raion. The raion was abolished in July 2020 as part of the administrative reform of Ukraine, which reduced the number of raions of Cherkasy Oblast to four. The area of Shpola Raion was merged into Zvenyhorodka Raion.

== History ==
After the revolution of 1917, Shpola became first a part of the Ukrainian Soviet Socialist Republic and then of the USSR.

During World War II, Nazi Germany invaded USSR, and the Jewish population of Shpola was massacred in 1942. Today Jews make up around 0.5% of Shpola's population.

== Demographics ==
In 1847, Shpola's Jewish population numbered 1,156. By 1897, that number had grown to 5,388 of a total population of 11,933, or about 45%. This level held steady until the Second World War. In 1989, the population of the city was 22,378 people.

== Sister city ==
Shpola is a sister city with Oskaloosa, Iowa.

== Notable people ==
- Ivan Kulyk (1897-1937) - Ukrainian poet, short stories writer, and diplomat;
- Lev Shvartzman (1907-1955) -- a senior Soviet secret police officer, known for his brutality;
- Oleksandr Tkachenko (1939-2024) - chairman of Ukrainian parliament;
- Itzik Feffer (1900-1952) - Yiddish poet;
- Aryeh Leib of Shpola, "der Shpoler zeyde" (Yiddish: "the grandfather of Shpola") (1725-1812) - Hasidic leader.

== See also ==
- List of cities in Ukraine

== Gallery ==
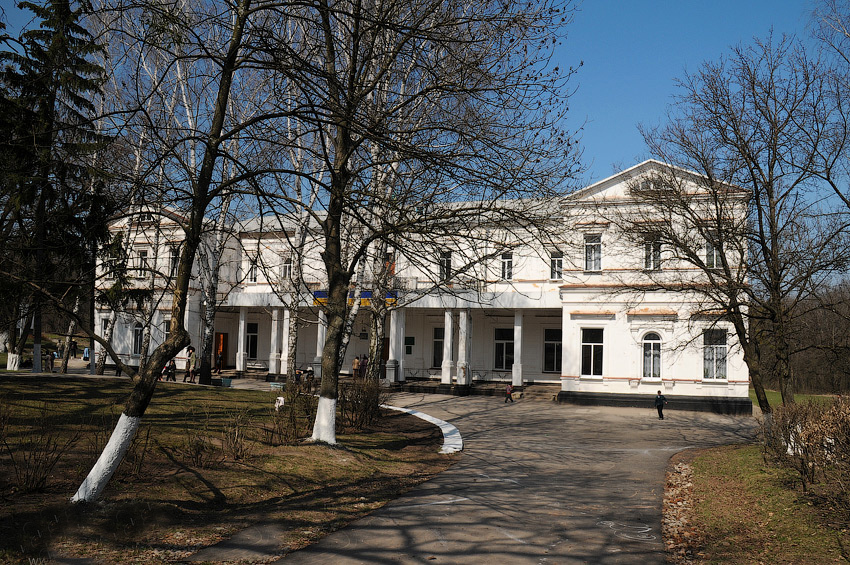
Abaza Palace

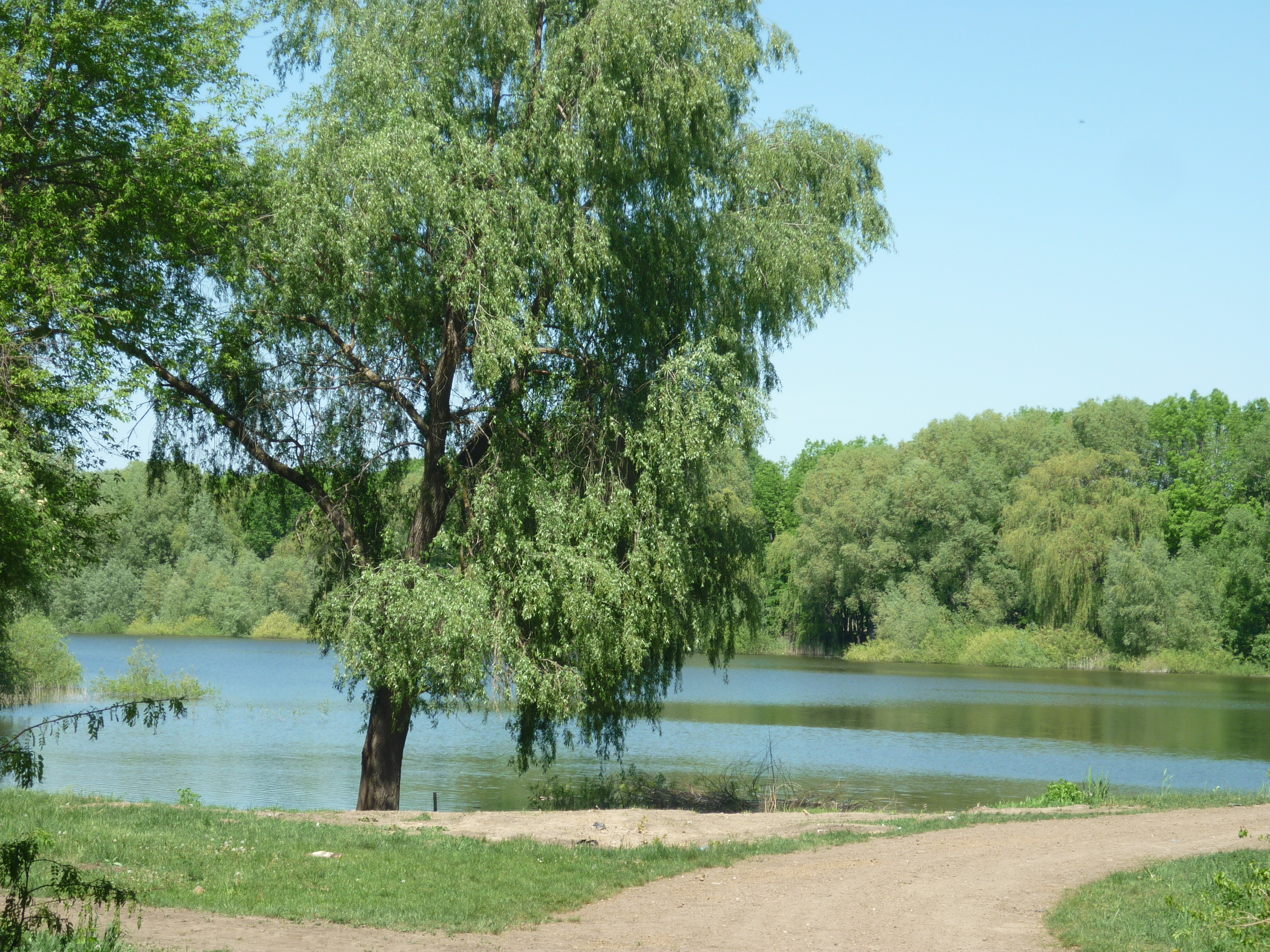
Khovkivka River near Shpola

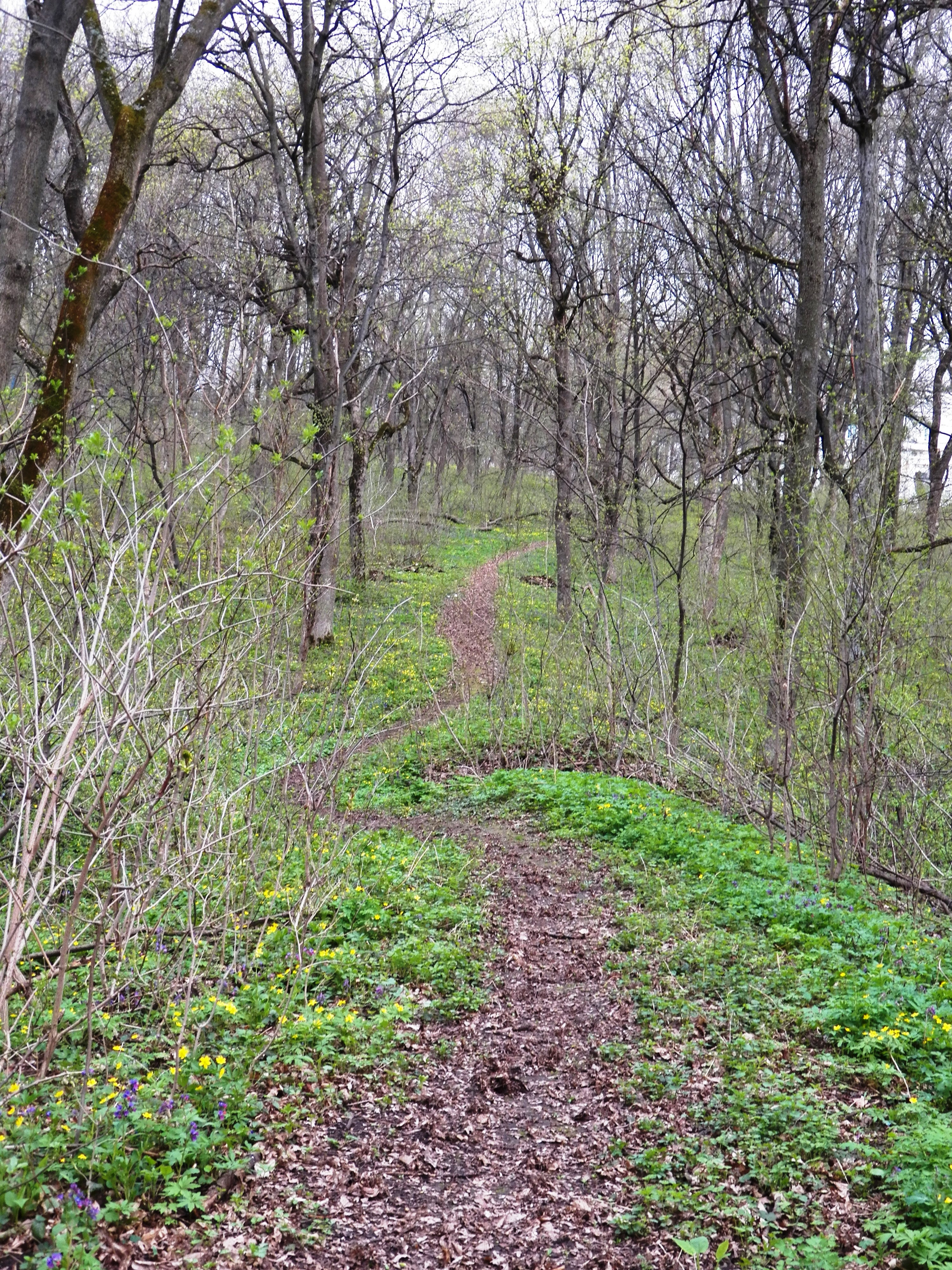
Darivka Park

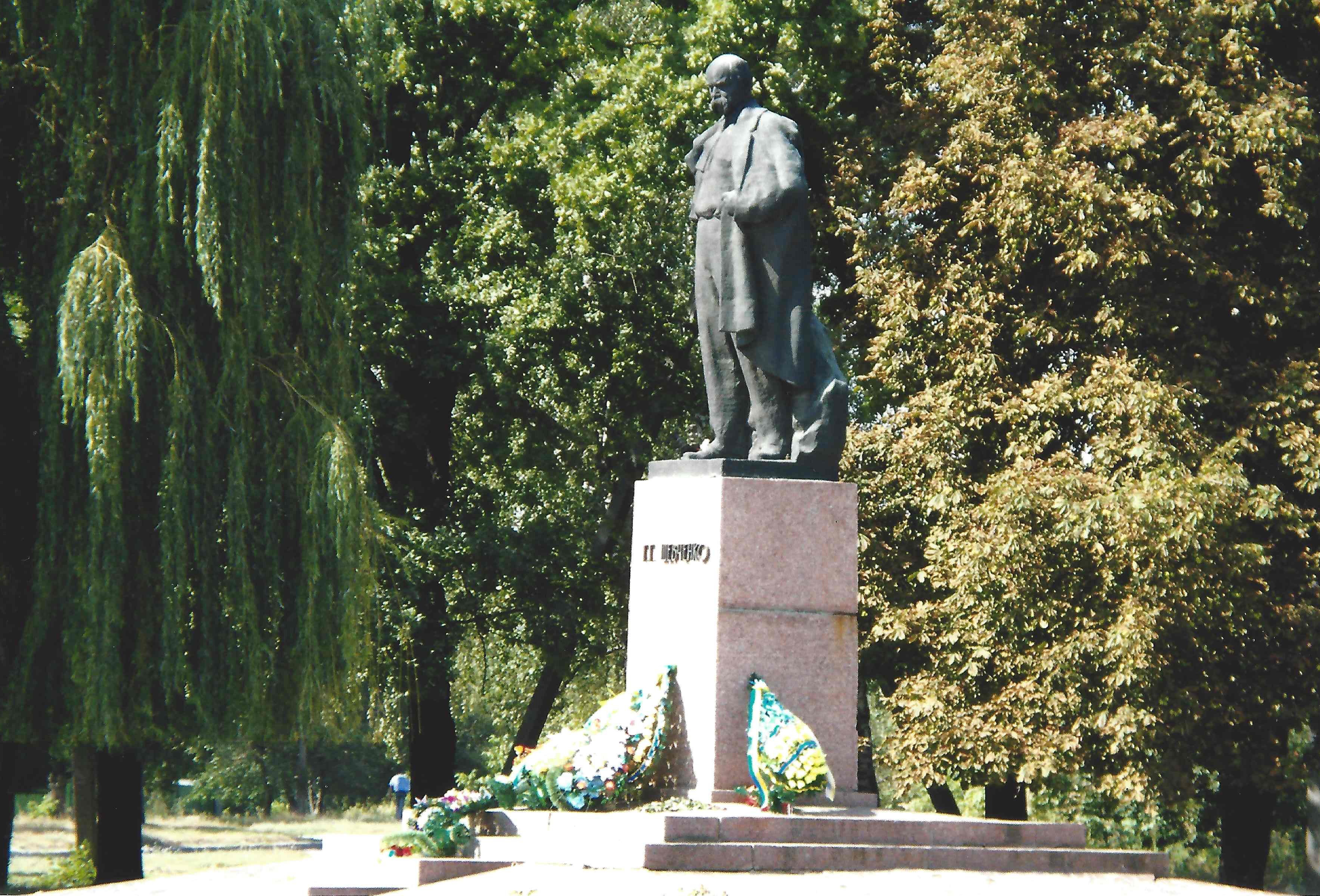
Taras Shevchenko statue

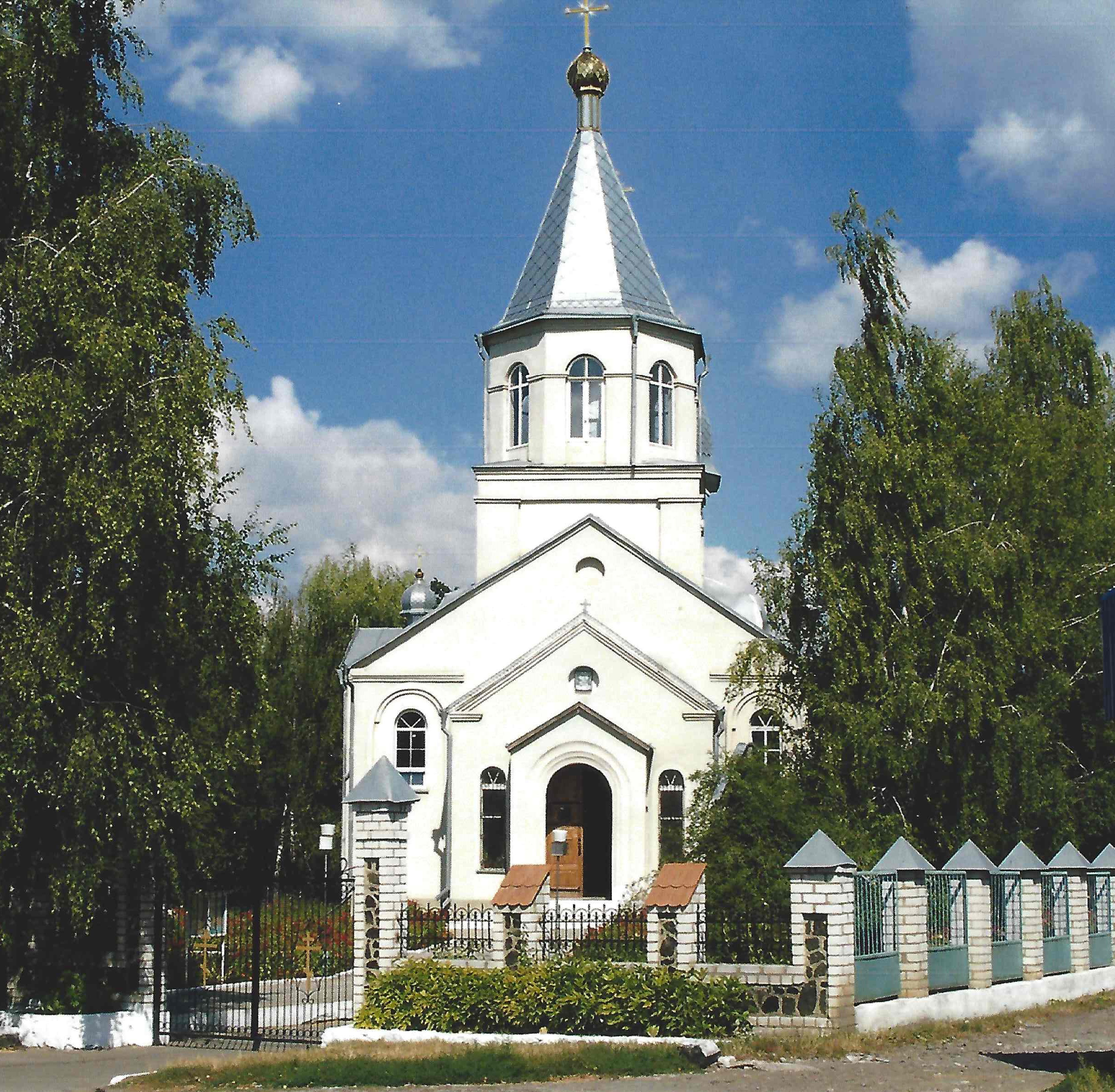
Ukrainian Orthodox Church
