= Brodetske, Cherkasy Oblast =

Village in Cherkasy Oblast, Ukraine

Brodetske Бродецьке
- Village
- Location in Cherkasy Oblast Location in Ukraine
- Country: Ukraine
- Oblast: Cherkasy Oblast
- Raion: Zvenyhorodka Raion

Population (2001)
  - Total: 519
- Time zone: UTC+2 (EET)
  - Summer (DST): UTC+3 (EEST)

Brodetske (Ukrainian: Бродецьке) is a village in Zvenyhorodka Raion of Cherkasy Oblast in Ukraine. Brodetske belongs to Katerynopil settlement hromada, one of the hromadas of Ukraine.

Until 18 July 2020, Brodetske belonged to Katerynopil Raion. The raion was abolished in July 2020 as part of the administrative reform of Ukraine, which reduced the number of raions of Cherkasy Oblast to four. The area of Katerynopil Raion was merged into Zvenyhorodka Raion.
