= Shpola urban hromada =

Urban hromada of Cherkasy Oblast, Ukraine

Shpola urban hromada Шполянська міська громада
- Hromada
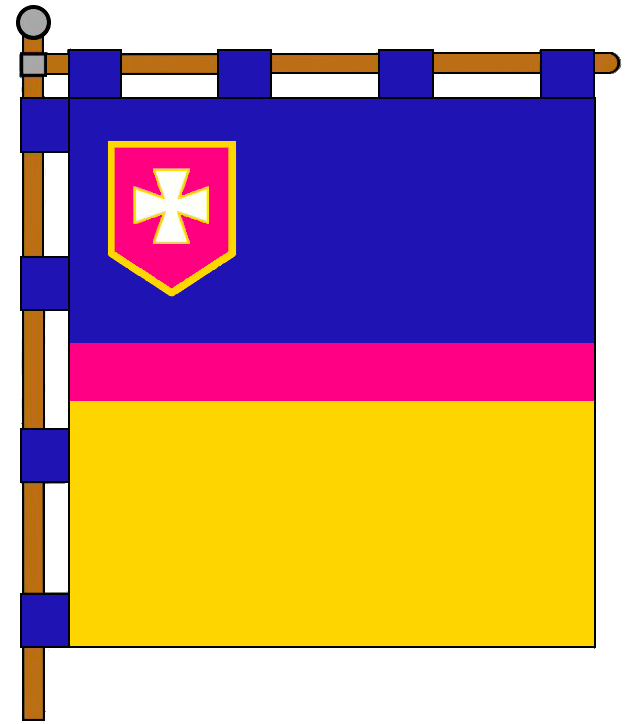
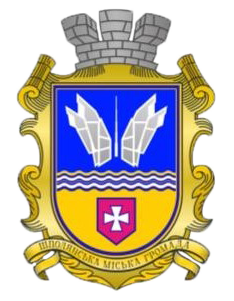
- Flag Seal
- Interactive map of Shpola urban hromada
- Country: Ukraine
- Oblast: Cherkasy
- Raion: Zvenyhorodka

Area
  - Total: 789.53 km^{2} (304.84 sq mi)

Population (2024)
  - Total: 33,473
  - Density: 42.396/km^{2} (109.81/sq mi)
- Settlements: 22
- Cities: 1
- Rural settlements: 1
- Villages: 20
- Website: shpola-otg.gov.ua

Shpola urban territorial hromada (Ukrainian: Шполянська міська територіальна громада, romanized: Shpolianska miska terytorialna hromada) is one of the hromadas of Ukraine, in Zvenyhorodka Raion within Cherkasy Oblast. Its administrative centre is the city of Shpola.

== Composition ==
The hromada contains 22 settlements: 1 city (Shpola), 1 rural settlement (Khovkivka), and 20 villages:

- Burty
- Heorhiivka
- Iskrene
- Kamianuvatka
- Kapustyne
- Krymky
- Lebedyn
- Lozuvatka
- Marianivka
- Nadtochaivka
- Serdehivka
- Skotareve
- Sobolivka
- Syhnaivka
- Tereshky
- Topylna
- Tovmach
- Vasylkiv
- Vodiane
- Zhuravka
