= Free Cossacks =

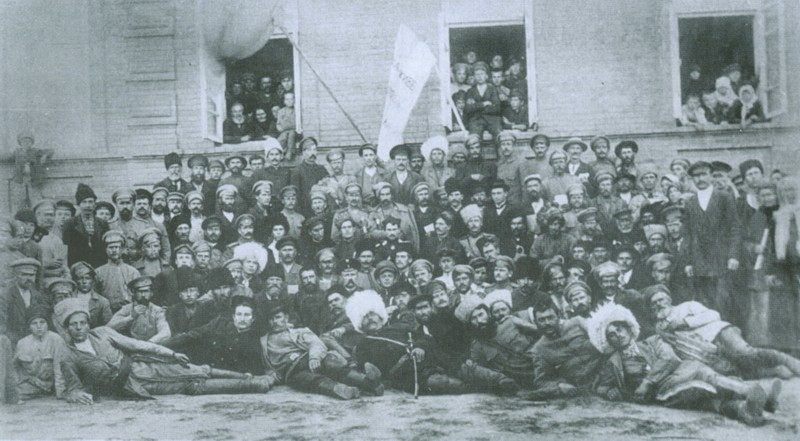
- 1st Congress of Free Cossacks (Chyhyryn, October 1917)
- Active: 1917–1918
- Country: Ukraine
- Allegiance: Ukrainian People's Republic
- Branch: Free Cossacks
- Type: Corps, territorial army
- Role: infantry, law enforcement
- Size: ~3,000 (18 May 1917); 60,000 (at the 1st Congress of Free Cossacks)
- Engagements: Ukrainian–Soviet War; Katerynoslav Uprising; Arsenal January Uprising; Battle of Zhmerynka

Commanders
- Notable commanders: Semen Hryzlo; Pavlo Skoropadsky; Mykhailo Kovenko

Free Cossacks (Ukrainian: Вільне козацтво) were Ukrainian Cossacks that were organized as volunteer militia units in the spring of 1917 in the Ukrainian People's Republic. The Free Cossacks are seen as precursors of the modern Ukrainian national law enforcement organizations such as the National Guard of Ukraine or the Internal Troops of Ukraine.

The primary purpose of those militia formations was to provide security and civil order for the local population. The consolidation process of various smaller units started sometime in April near the town of Zvenyhorodka, Kiev Governorate during the local assembly of the Free Cossacks which created the Zvenyhorodka Kish (battalion). The assembly elected Semen Hryzlo the Kish Otaman, who became the otaman of Kalnyboloto kurin (company). Under this title, he was delegated to the 2nd All-Ukrainian Military Congress in Kiev in June 1917.

Hryzlo was also one of the organizers of the 1st All-Ukrainian Congress of the Free Cossacks that took place on October 3, 1917, in the former Cossack capital of Chyhyryn. The congress elected General Pavlo Skoropadskyi its otaman. Hryzlo was elected as the General osavul.

Free Cossack units distinguished themselves during the early stages of Ukrainian–Soviet War between December 1917 and April 1918. In January-April 1918 the Ukrainian government tried to reform the force into a Free Registered Cossack Troops in order to provide territorial defence. However, after the April coup-d'etat led by Pavlo Skoropadsky all Free Cossack formations were officially dissolved between May and June 1918.

Following the disbandment of their units, many Free Cossacks joined rebel squads during the Anti-Hetman Uprising and took part in the struggle against the Bolsheviks.

== Organization ==
Initially Free Cossacks were subordinated to the General Secretariat of Internal Affairs, but in January 1918 their units were subjected to the Secretariat of Military Affairs.

Units of Free Cossacks were organized according to the territorial principle, with each village providing a sotnia, several of which united into a kurin on the volost level; several kurins in their turn created a regiment (polk), which acted on the leval of a povit, and several regiments made up a kish. Units were commanded by elected officers (starshyna) and provided their needs in weapons from taxation.

During 1917 Free Cossack units covered the areas of Kyiv, Volhynia, Kherson, Poltava and Chernihiv. Most of the Free Cossacks belonged to the peasant class, although in some areas, particularly in Kyiv, many workers also entered their ranks.

== See also ==
- Red Cossacks
- Atamanshchina
- Ukraine after the Russian Revolution
- Ukrainian–Soviet War
- Registered Cossacks
