= Lysianka Raion =

Former subdivision of Cherkasy Oblast, Ukraine

Lysianka Raion Лисянський район
- Raion
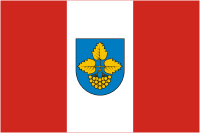
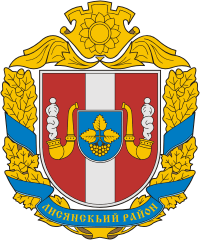
- Flag Coat of arms

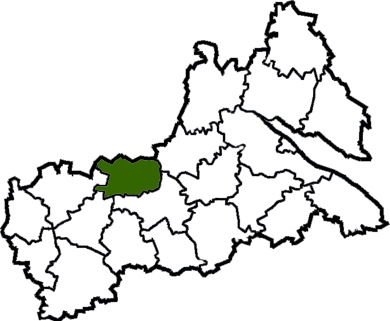
- Coordinates: 49°15′30.7″N 30°41′55.1″E
- Country: Ukraine
- Region: Cherkasy Oblast
- Established: 7 March 1923
- Disestablished: 18 July 2020
- Admin. center: Lysianka
- Subdivisions: List: — city councils; — settlement councils; — rural councils; Number of localities: — cities; — urban-type settlements; 38 — villages; — rural settlements

Government
  - Governor: Anatolii Vasyl'ovych Bondarenko

Area
  - Total: 746 km^{2} (288 sq mi)

Population (2020)
  - Total: 22,202
  - Density: 29.8/km^{2} (77.1/sq mi)
- Time zone: UTC+02:00 (EET)
  - Summer (DST): UTC+03:00 (EEST)
- Postal index: 19300-19399
- Area code: 380-4749
- Website: Verkhovna Rada website

Lysianka Raion (Ukrainian: Лисянський район, Lysyans'kyi Raion) was a raion (administrative district) of Cherkasy Oblast. Its area was 746 square kilometres, and the administrative center was the urban-type settlement of Lysianka. The raion was abolished on 18 July 2020 as part of the administrative reform of Ukraine, which reduced the number of raions of Cherkasy Oblast to four. The area of Lysianka Raion was merged into Zvenyhorodka Raion. The last estimate of the raion population was 22,202 (2020 est.)

At the time of disestablishment, the raion consisted of three hromadas:

- Buzhanka rural hromada with the administration in the selo of Buzhanka;
- Lysianka settlement hromada with the administration in Lysianka;
- Vynohrad rural hromada with the administration in the selo of Vynohrad.

== Population ==
The population of the Lysianka Raion (as of 2001) was 28,721.

== Subdivisions ==
The Lysianka Raion consisted of 1 town (Lysianka) and 38 villages. The villages of the Lysianka Raion included:

- Bosivka
- Boyarka
- Budysche
- Buzhanka
- Vereschaky
- Vynohrad
- Votylivka
- Ganzhalivka
- Dashukivka
- Dibrivka
- Dubyna
- Zhabyanka
- Zhurzhyntsi
- Kamyanyi Brid
- Kuchkivka
- Maryanivka
- Mykhailivka
- Orly, Ukraine
- Petrivka-Popivka
- Petrivska-Huta
- Pysarivka
- Pohyblyak
- Pochapyntsi
- Ripky
- Rozkoshivka
- Rubanyi Mist
- Semenivka
- Smilchyntsi
- Tyhonivka
- Tovsti Rohy
- Fedyukivka
- Huzhyntsi
- Chaplynka
- Chesnivka
- Shesteryntsi
- Shubyni Stavy
- Shushkivka
- Yablunivka

== See also ==
- Subdivisions of Ukraine
