= Popilnia =

Rural settlement in Zhytomyr Oblast, Ukraine

- Rural settlement
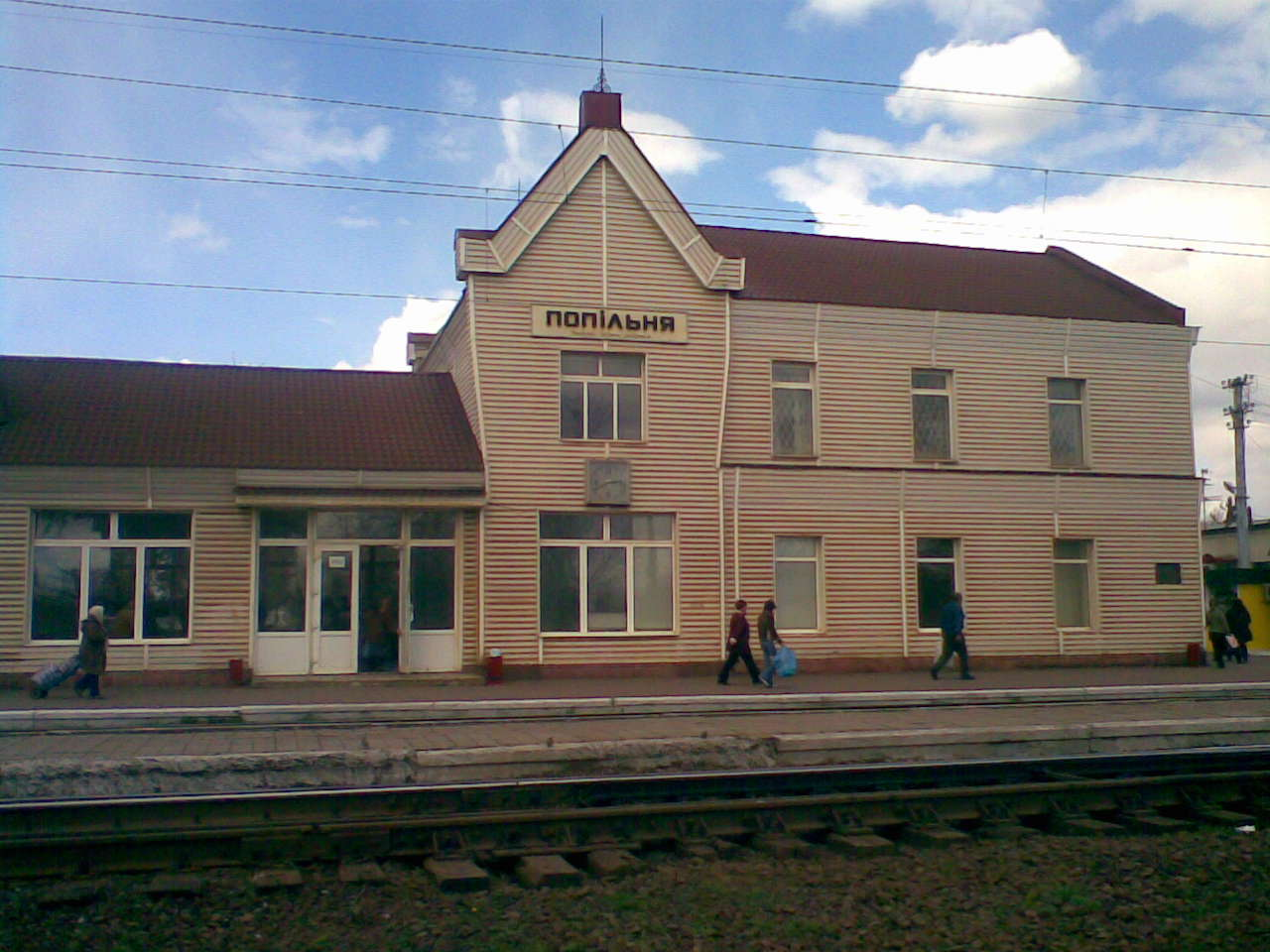
- Popilnia railway station

- Location within Zhytomyr Oblast Location within Ukraine
- Country: Ukraine
- Oblast: Zhytomyr Oblast
- District: Zhytomyr Raion
- Founded: 1870

Area
  - Total: 4 km^{2} (1.5 sq mi)

Population (2022)
  - Total: 5,323
  - Density: 1,300/km^{2} (3,400/sq mi)
- Time zone: UTC+2 (EET)
  - Summer (DST): UTC+3 (EEST)
- Postal code: 13500-13503

Popilnia or Popilnya (Ukrainian: Попільня) is a rural settlement in Zhytomyr Raion, Zhytomyr Oblast, Ukraine. It is the administrative center of Popilnia Raion. Population: 5,323 (2022 estimate) In 2001, its population was 6,109.

== History ==
Until 26 January 2024, Popilnia was designated urban-type settlement. On this day, a new law entered into force which abolished this status, and Popilnia became a rural settlement.
