= Bahacheve =

City in Cherkasy Oblast, Ukraine

Bahacheve Багачеве
- City
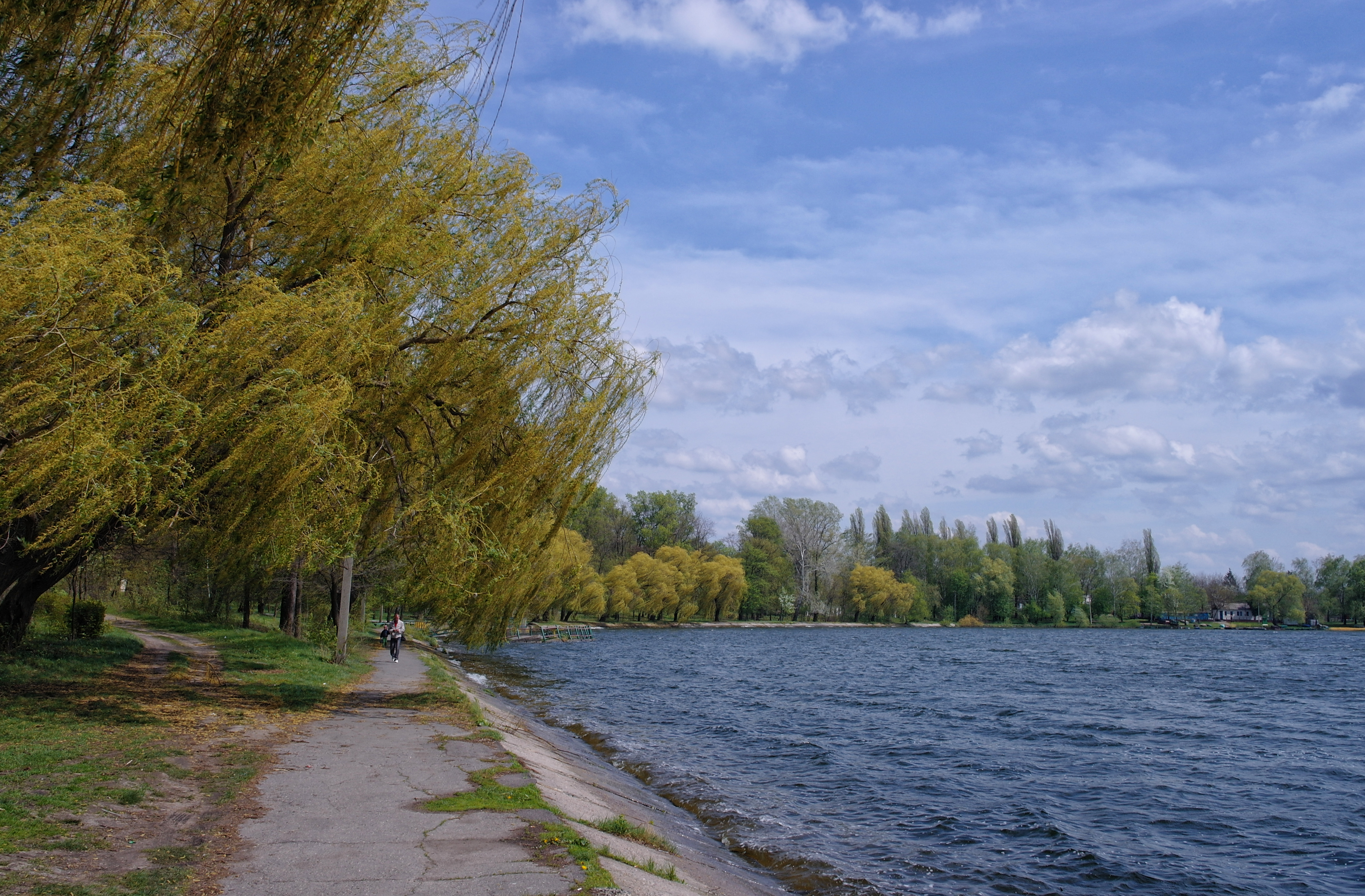
- City park

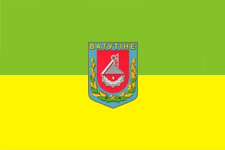
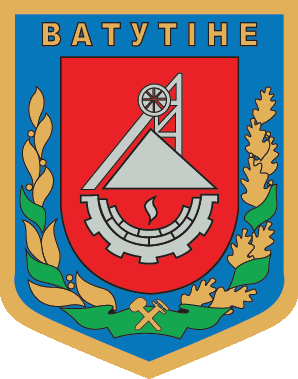
- Flag Coat of arms

- Location of Bahacheve Bahacheve (Ukraine)
- Coordinates: 49°00′43″N 31°04′17″E
- Country: Ukraine
- Oblast: Cherkasy Oblast
- Raion: Zvenyhorodka Raion
- Hromada: Vatutine urban hromada
- Founded: 1947
- City status: 1952

Government
  - Mayor: Oleksandr Zaborovets

Area
  - Total: 1,089 km^{2} (420 sq mi)
- Elevation: 127 m (417 ft)

Population (2022)
  - Total: 15,763
  - Density: 14.47/km^{2} (37.49/sq mi)
- Postal code: 20250
- Area code: +380-4740

Bahacheve (Ukrainian: Багачеве, IPA: [bɐɦɐˈtʃɛwe]), formerly known as Vatutine (Ukrainian: Ватутіне) is a city in Zvenyhorodka Raion, Cherkasy Oblast, Ukraine. It hosts the administration of Vatutine urban hromada, one of the hromadas of Ukraine. It had a population of 15,763 (2022 estimate).

== Administrative status ==
Vatutine gained status as a city in 1952. Until 18 July 2020, Vatutine was designated as a city of oblast significance and belonged to Vatutine Municipality but not to any raion. As part of the administrative reform of Ukraine, which reduced the number of raions of Cherkasy Oblast to four, the city was merged into Zvenyhorodka Raion.

== History ==
The city was founded as an urban-type settlement in 1949.

On 3 April 2024, the Committee on the Organization of State Power, Local Self-government, Regional Development, and Urban Planning in the Verkhovna Rada stated their support for renaming the city to Bahacheve as part of the derussification campaign, considering that the name Vatutine is derived from Nikolai Vatutin. On 19 September 2024, the Verkhovna Rada voted to rename Vatutine to Bahacheve.

== Demographics ==
In January 1989, the population of the city was 20, 362 people. In December 2022, the population of the city was 20,400 people.

== Economy ==
A brick and tile factory and a woodworking enterprise were built in the city.

=== Language ===
Distribution of the population by native language according to the 2001 census:

Language	Number	Percentage
Ukrainian	18 362	91.69%
Russian	1 594	7.96%
Other^{[a]}	71	0.35%
Total	20 027	100.00%

^{a} Those who did not indicate their native language or indicated a language that was native to less than 1% of the local population.

== Twin towns ==
Bahacheve is twinned with:

- Smila, Ukraine

== See also ==
- List of cities in Ukraine
