= Vynohrad, Cherkasy Oblast =

Village in Cherkasy Oblast, Ukraine

Coordinates: 49°14′11″N 30°32′50″E

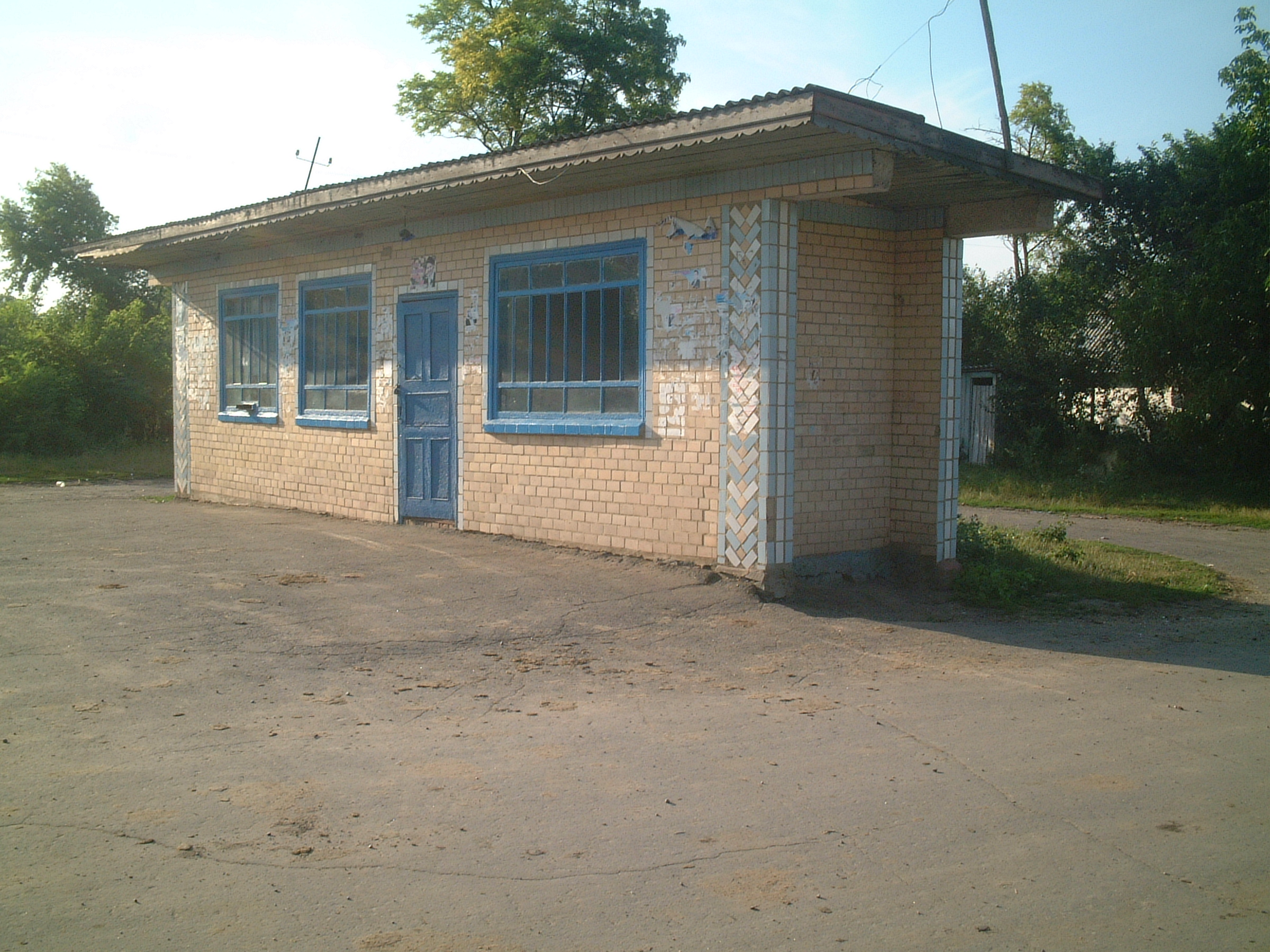
The main bus station of Vynohrad

Vynohrad (Ukrainian: Виноград) is a village in Zvenyhorodka Raion of Cherkasy Oblast. It hosts the administration of Vynohrad rural hromada, one of the hromadas of Ukraine. As of 2024, its population was 851.

Until 18 July 2020, Vynohrad belonged to Lysianka Raion. The raion was abolished in July 2020 as part of the administrative reform of Ukraine, which reduced the number of raions of Cherkasy Oblast to four. The area of Lysianka Raion was merged into Zvenyhorodka Raion.
