= Zelenyi Hai, Romny Raion, Sumy Oblast =

Village in Sumy Oblast, Ukraine

Zelenyi Hai Зелений Гай
- Village
- Location of Zelenyi Hai Zelenyi Hai (Ukraine)
- Coordinates: 50°45′28″N 33°44′11″E
- Country: Ukraine
- Oblast: Sumy Oblast
- Raion: Romny Raion
- Hromada: Nedryhailiv settlement hromada
- Elevation: 167 m (548 ft)

Population (2001)
  - Total: 13
- Postal code: 42140
- Area code: +380 5455
- Climate: Cfa

Zelenyi Hai (Ukrainian: Зелений Гай) is a village in Romny Raion, Sumy Oblast (province) of Ukraine.

Until 18 July 2020, Zelenyi Hai was located in the Nedryhailiv Raion. The raion was abolished on that day as part of the administrative reform of Ukraine, which reduced the number of raions of Sumy Oblast to five.

The area of Nedryhailiv Raion was merged into Sumy Raion.
