= Semen Hryzlo =

Ukrainian military and civil activist

- Born: c1887 Katerynopil, Kiev Governorate, Russian Empire
- Died: 3 March 1921 near Novoselytsya village, Kiev Governorate, Ukraine
- Military career
- Allegiance: (Russia) Russian Empire (?-1917) (Ukraine) Ukrainian People's Republic (1917-1921)
- Branch: Black Sea Fleet; Free Cossacks
- Service years: ? - 1921
- Rank: Colonel
- Unit: Zvenyhorod Kosh
- Commands: Kanyboloto Kurin; Zvenyhorod Kosh
- Conflicts: World War I Potyemkin's Uprising; Ukrainian–Soviet War

Semen Hryhorovych Hryzlo (Ukrainian: Семен Григорович Гризло; 1887? – 3 March 1921) was a Ukrainian military and civil activist, one of the organizers of the Free Cossacks military formations, and a participant in the uprising on the battleship Potemkin (Borets za Svobodu).

== Biography ==
Semen Hryzlo was born sometime in the late 1880s in the town of Katerynopil, Zvenigorod uyezd, in the Kiev Governorate, and worked as a scribe and teacher at a local rural school.

Later Hryzlo was drafted into the Black Sea Fleet, where he served on the battleship Potemkin. For his participation in the Potemkin mutiny of 1905, Hryzlo was exiled to Siberia. At the start of 1917 he returned home and became a member of the Ukrainian Socialist Revolutionary Party. Hryzlo was an active participant in the cultural life of the village of Husakove in the Zvenigorod uyezd.

He was one of the first who military organisers of the Free Cossacks, becoming the otaman (military commander) of the Kaniboloto Kurin in March 1917. At the first Congress of the Free Cossacks of Zvenigorod uyezd in April 1917 Hryzlo was elected the Kosh Otaman. In June 1917 he was delegated to Kiev for the 2nd All-Ukrainian Military Congress representing Zvenigorod uyezd.

Hryzlo was one of the organizers the 1st All-Ukrainian Congress of the Free Cossacks that took place on 3 October 1917 in Chyhyryn where he was elected as a general osavul of Free Cossacks. About that time he had some 20,000 cossacks loyal to him personally. In February 1918 his troops forced the artillerymen of the 2nd Corps of the Russian Guard to lay down their arms, and later forced the surrender of the 6th and the 7th dragoon regiments of the Russian cavalry. In February 1918 the Hryzlo's Cossacks were successful in defeating several units of the 8th Russian Army near the rail station of Bobrynsk.

At the end of 1918 Hryzlo was in charge of an armored train operating in Volyn. He later came under the command the Northern Front of the Ukrainian People's Army led by otaman Volodymyr Oskilko. During Oskilko's Uprising, Hryzlo supported his commander. After the mutiny he returned home to the Cherkasy land where he wagedguerrilla warfare against the Bolsheviks' presence, reestablishing the Free Cossacks formations.

Hryzlo was an active participant of the Kholodny Yar Ukrainian partisan movement cooperating with Ivan Gonta (real name Ivan Lyuty-Lyutenko). In the vicinity of Mokra Kalyhirka the united forces of Hryzlo and Gonta defeated the "execution division" of the Red Army. By the end of 1920, Hryzlo had allied with the otamans Kvitkovski and Petro Dereshchuk under the leadership of Andri Huly-Hulenko. As members of the Kholodny Yar they managed to defeat the 45th and the 47th Soviet Infantry divisions, selected units of the 1st Cavalry Army, and Grigory Kotovsky's brigades.

Over the time Hryzlo also cooperated with such military leaders as Pylyp Khmara, Larion Zahorodni, and others. On 3 March 1921 near the village of Novoselytsya near Zvenyhorodka Hryzlo was ambushed and then surrounded by several squads of the Red Army where he perished. He was buried in the Zvenyhorod cemetery.
