= Yerky settlement hromada =

Coordinates: 48°58′30″N 31°01′40″E

Yerky settlement hromada Єрківська селищна громада
- Hromada
- Interactive map of Yerky settlement hromada
- Country: Ukraine
- Oblast: Cherkasy
- Raion: Zvenyhorodka

Area
  - Total: 52.5 km^{2} (20.3 sq mi)

Population
  - Total: 4,883
  - Density: 93.0/km^{2} (241/sq mi)
- Settlements: 3
- Rural settlements: 1
- Villages: 2
- Website: erkivska-gromada.gov.ua

Yerky settlement hromada is a hromada in the Zvenyhorodka Raion of Cherkasy Oblast of Ukraine. Its administrative centre is the rural settlement of Yerky.

== Composition ==
The hromada includes one settlement (Yerky) and 2 villages:

- Zalizniachka
- Radchykha
