= Zelenyi Hai, Dnipro Raion, Dnipropetrovsk Oblast =

Zelenyi Hai Зелений Гай
- Village
- Petropavlivskyi.png Zelenyi Hai (Ukraine)
- Coordinates: 48°29′0″N 36°23′5″E
- Country: Ukraine
- Oblast: Dnepropetrovsk oblast
- Raion: Synelnykove Raion

Population
  - Total: 45
- Postal code: 52705

Zelenyi Hai (Ukrainian: Зелений Гай) is a village in Ukraine, located in Synelnykove Raion of Dnipropetrovsk Oblast. It is part of the Bohynivka rural hromada. The population is 45.

== History ==
On 12 June 2020, in accordance with the Order of the Cabinet of Ministers of Ukraine No. 709-r "On determining the administrative centres and approving the territories of territorial communities of Dnipropetrovsk Oblast", the village became part of the Bragynivka (Bohynivka) rural hromada.

On 19 July 2020, as a result of the Administrative-territorial reform in Ukraine and the liquidation of Petropavlivka Raion, the village became part of the newly formed Synelnykove Raion.

== Geography ==
The village of Zelenyi Hai is located on the right bank of the Samara River. Upstream, at a distance of 4.5 km, lies the village of Kokhanivka; downstream, at a distance of 2.5 km, is the village of Shevchenka; on the opposite bank is the settlement of Petropavlivka. The village of Bohynivka is located 1.5 km away. In this area, the river is winding, forming limans, oxbow lakes, and marshy lakes.

== Demographics ==
=== Language ===
Distribution of the population by native language according to the 2001 Census:

Language	Percentage
Ukrainian	80.0 %
Russian	20.0 %

== Landmarks ==
Near the village is the local significance ornithological reserve "Samara River Floodplain".
