= Yerky =

Rural locality in Cherkasy Oblast, Ukraine

Yerky Єрки
- Rural settlement
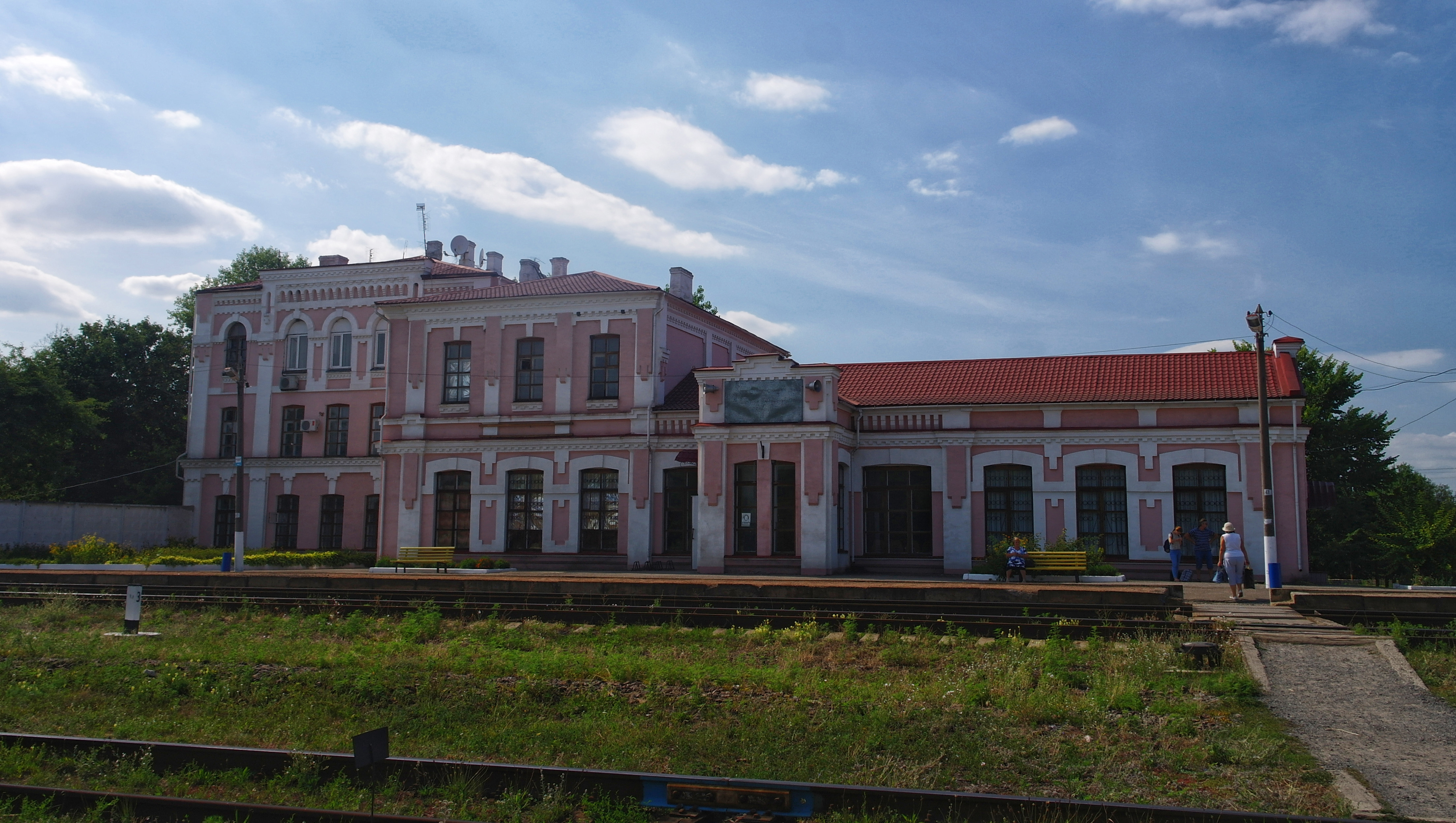
- Zvenyhorodka railway station, which, despite its name, is located in Yerky

- Location of Yerky in Ukraine Yerky (Ukraine)
- Coordinates: 48°58′57″N 30°59′57″E
- Country: Ukraine
- Oblast: Cherkasy Oblast
- Raion: Zvenyhorodka Raion
- Urban-type settlement status: 1960

Government
  - Town Head: Leonid Polovyi
- Elevation: 126 m (413 ft)

Population
  - Total: 4,249
- Time zone: UTC+2 (EET)
  - Summer (DST): UTC+3 (EEST)
- Postal code: 20505
- Area code: +380 4742

Yerky (Ukrainian: Єрки) is a rural settlement in Zvenyhorodka Raion, Cherkasy Oblast, central Ukraine. It hosts the administration of Yerky settlement hromada, one of the hromadas of Ukraine. Population: 4,249 (2022 estimate).

== Population ==
The population of Yerky settlement hromada: 5594.

=== Language ===
Distribution of the population by native language according to the 2001 census:

Language	Number	Percentage
Ukrainian	4 269	97.82%
Russian	91	2.09%
Other	4	0.09%
Total	4 364	100.00%

== History ==
Until 18 July 2020, Yerky belonged to Katerynopil Raion. The raion was abolished in July 2020 as part of the administrative reform of Ukraine, which reduced the number of raions of Cherkasy Oblast to four. The area of Katerynopil Raion was merged into Zvenyhorodka Raion.

Until 26 January 2024, Yerky was designated urban-type settlement. On this day, a new law entered into force which abolished this status, and Yerky became a rural settlement.

== Notable people ==
- Viacheslav Chornovil (1937-1999), Ukrainian politician, dissident, and longtime proponent of Ukrainian independence.
