= Zelenyi Hai, Cherkasy Oblast =

Village in Cherkasy Oblast, Ukraine

Zelenyi Hai Зелений Гай
- Village
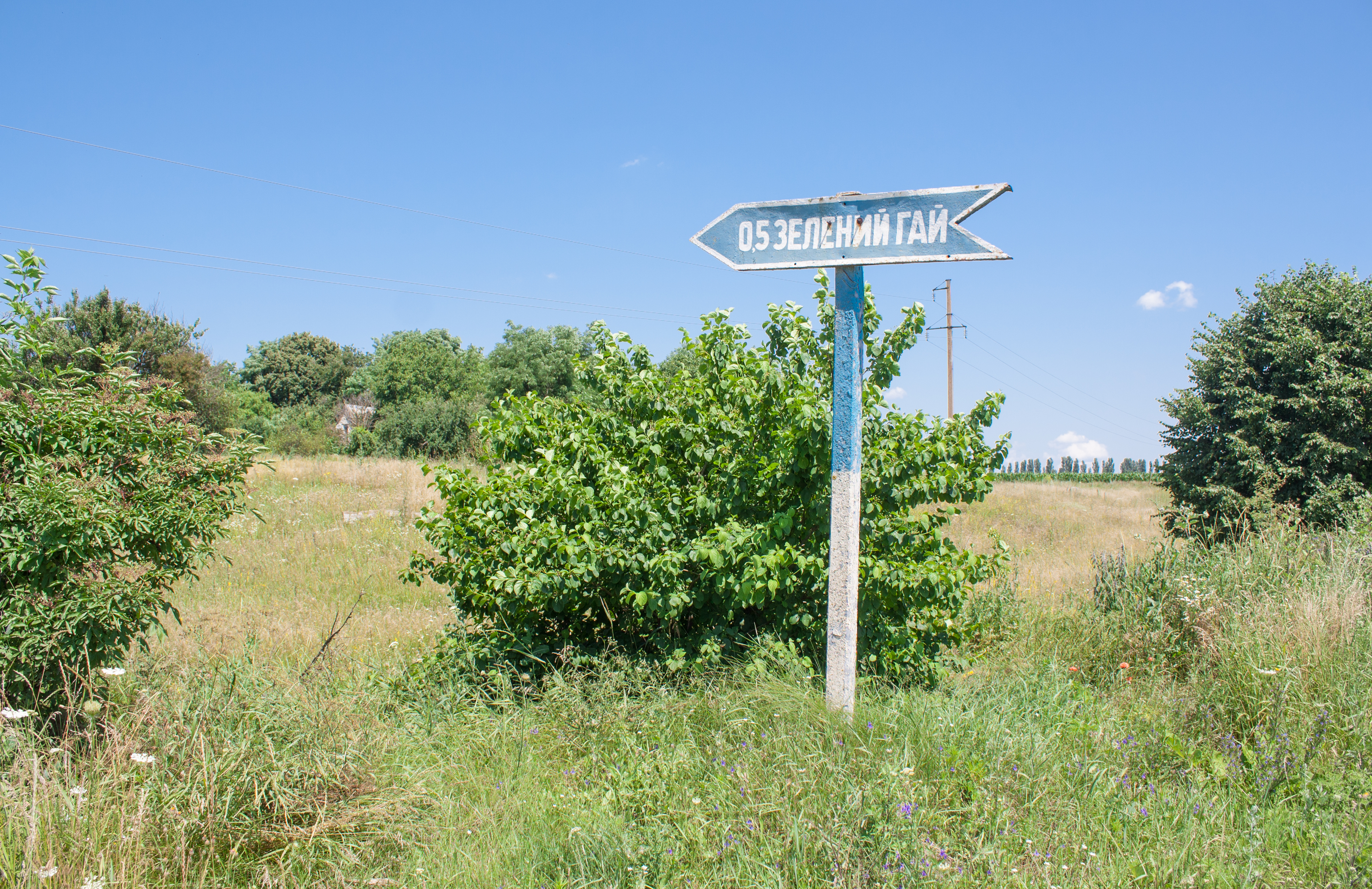

- Location of Zelenyi Hai Zelenyi Hai (Ukraine)
- Coordinates: 49°02′30″N 30°21′35″E
- Country: Ukraine
- Oblast: Cherkasy Oblast
- Raion: Uman Raion

Population (2001)
  - Total: 221
- Postal code: 20120
- Climate: Cfa

Zelenyi Hai (Ukrainian: Зелений Гай) is a village in Uman Raion, Cherkasy Oblast, Ukraine.

Zelenyi Hai was previously located in the Mankivka Raion. The raion was abolished on 18 July 2020 as part of the administrative reform of Ukraine, which reduced the number of raions of Cherkasy Oblast to four. The area of Mankivka Raion was merged into Uman Raion.
