= Ozeryshche, Ukraine =

Village in Cherkasy Oblast, Ukraine

Ozeryshche Озерище Ozerysche
- Village
- Location within Cherkasy Oblast Location within Ukraine
- Coordinates: 49°50′18″N 31°38′44″E
- Country Region Municipality: Ukraine; Cherkasy Oblast; Cherkasy Raion
- First mentioned: 1800 (as a village)

Government
  - Type: Village Council
  - Body: 12
  - Chairman: Tetiana Zakharchenko; Ph: 04736-96621

Area
  - Land: 102 km^{2} (39 sq mi)
- Elevation: 134 m (440 ft)

Population
  - Total: 238
  - Density: 233/km^{2} (600/sq mi)
- Time zone: UTC+2 (EET)
  - Summer (DST): UTC+3 (EEST)
- Postal code: 19021
- Area code: +380 4736

Ozeryshche or Ozerysche (Ukrainian: Озерище [ozeˈrɪʃtʃe]) is a village located in Cherkasy Raion, Cherkasy Oblast, in Central Ukraine. The village belongs to an eponymous village council - the Ozeryshche village council and to Lipliave rural hromada, one of the hromadas of Ukraine.

The village name came from four lakes (Ukrainian: Озерo, romanized: Ozero) that were located in there.

Until the middle of the 20th century there was a hamlet - khutir Svynyntsi (Ukrainian: Свининці) in the west of Ozeryshche, which was mentioned in Ulas Samchuk's book "Moroziv khutir" (1948). It was named Svynyntsi because there were a lot of wild swine (Ukrainian: свині) in surrounding forests.

There is a parish of the Seventh-day Adventist Church although most of religious people in the village are Eastern Orthodox Christians.

== Geographical location ==
The village is situated in the West of the Dnieper Lowland and the historical region Left-bank Ukraine.

The village council area borders the Kaniv reservoir in the west, the Kyiv Oblast in the north, the Zolotonosha Raion in the east and the Lipliave village council area in the south. Western and northern territories of the village council belong to Biloozerskyi National Nature Park, which covers riverside forests located on the left bank of the Dnieper, at the border of the Kyiv and Cherkasy regions.

By roads, the village is located:

- 13 km to the nearest railway station Liaplava.
- 22 km to the district centre Kaniv.
- 77 km to the region centre Cherkasy.
- 110 km to Boryspil International Airport.
- 138 km to the capital of Ukraine, Kyiv.

Highway R 09 (Myronivka - Sofiivka) goes thought the territory of the village council, that connects Kaniv to Highway N 08 (Boryspil - Zaporizhia).

== Population ==
The population of the village is 238 people of 179 households in 2016.

=== Language ===
Native language of the villagers according to the Ukrainian Census (2001)
1. Ukrainian (90.5%)
2. Russian (9.55%)

According to the Russian Empire Census in 1897 the rural population of the Pereiaslav Povit (Uezd), which included Ozeryshche, consisted of 96.35% Ukrainian, 2.35% Jewish, 0.57% Russian and 0.06% Polish speaking people.

Distribution of the population by native language according to the 2001 census:

Language	Number	Percentage
Ukrainian	284	90.45%
Russian	30	9.55%
Total	314	100.00%

== History ==
=== Early time ===
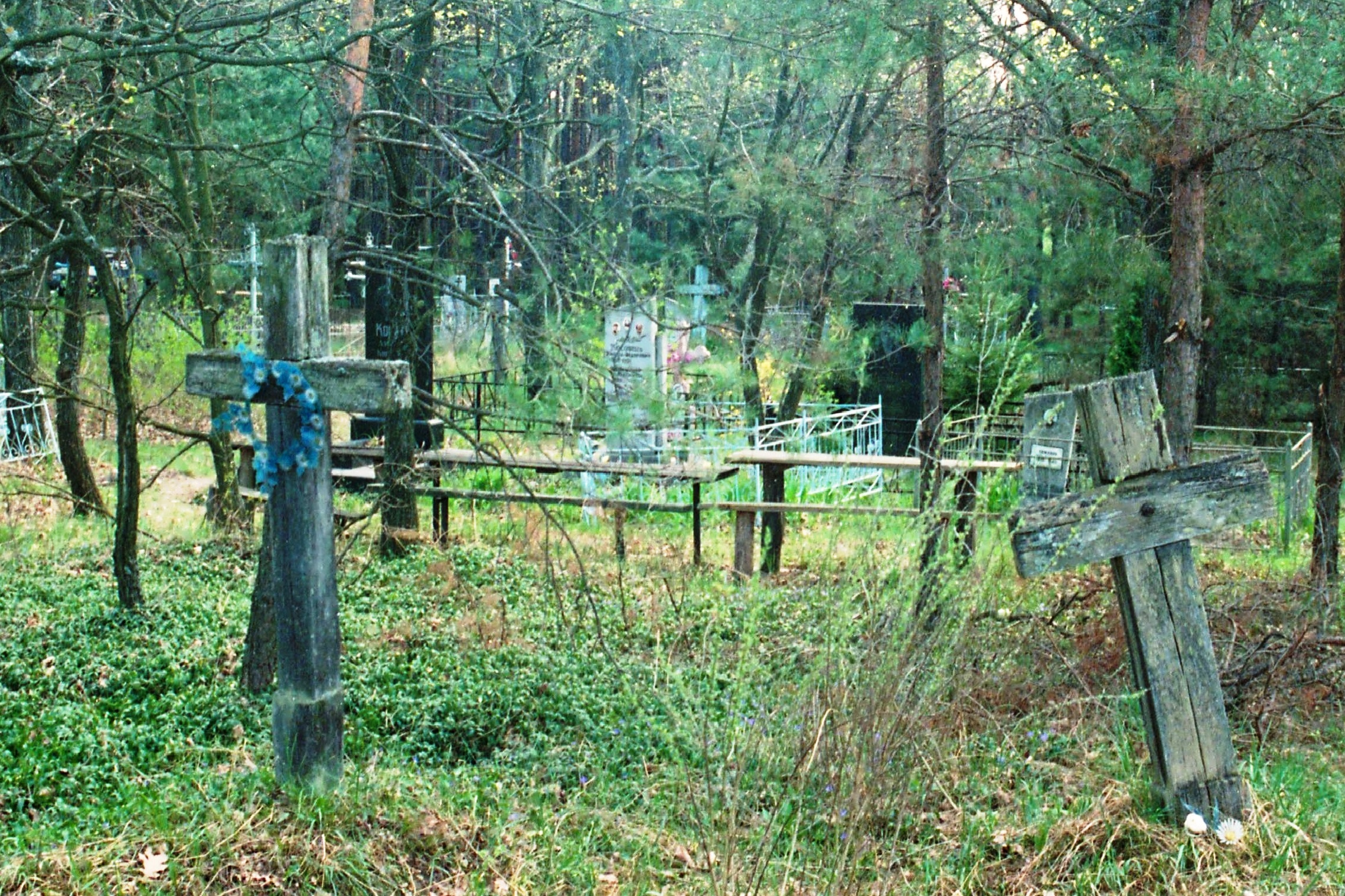
Old oak crosses at the village cemetery.

There were remains of several ancient settlements and a grave field of the Neolithic (V-III millennium BC), Chernyakhov culture and Kievan Rus found in a few kilometers east of the village, next to the former khutir Borok. In 1994 the National Academy of Sciences of Ukraine conducted an archaeological expedition in settlements and their surroundings on the left bank of the Kaniv Reservoir. Among the others, there were archaeological findings of different historical eras, including of Kievan Rus period, found nearby Ozeryshche village.

Before the Kievan Rus epoch, there had been а boundary between Eastern Polans and Severians tribes in there. At the time of Kievan Rus the land belonged to the Principality of Pereiaslav, at the time of the Grand Duchy of Lithuania to the Principality of Kiev and after the Union of Lublin to the Kaniv Starostwo of the Kiev Voivodeship of the Crown of the Kingdom of Poland of the Polish–Lithuanian Commonwealth.

Ozerishchi settlement is mentioned in the book of a Ukrainian historian Volodymyr Kryvosheia "Genealogy of Ukrainian Cossacks. Pereiaslav Regiment", as a part of Pereiaslav Regiment of the Cossack Hetmanate.

The village has been known as Ozerishche since 1800.

As of 1832 Ozerishche was a hamlet (hutir) of Khotski village, which held a mansion of the nobleman Kostiantyn Illiashenko. On the Military Topographic Map of the Russian Empire 1846-1863, edition 1868, the khutir Ozeryshche is shown as nobleman's estate surrounded by the forest. There are khutir Svynytsi in the south-west and numerous small kutirs (homesteads) in the fields, next to Ozeryshche in the east.

According to the registry books of St Archangel Michael's church in the middle of the 19th century there were 11 domestic workers at nobleman's mansion and 58 peasants living in the village.

In 1860 a hamlet Rozdol-Berezovii (Роздол-Березовий) hutir was founded near the village in the east. Its first settler was Lipliave village born A. S. Bereza (А. С.Береза), who bought that land from а landlord Ms. Doroshkevych. He resold the bought land to other peasant families from Right-bank Ukraine (Kolesnyk's, Tsarenko's, Malusha's and others).

In the early 20th century a small wooden St. Constantine's church was built on funds of a landlord Mr. Zavoiko.

A diaspora Ukrainian writer Mariya Livytska mentions Ozerysche in her book "On the edge of two epochs" (1972). In particular, the book says that according to the legend of witnesses in the mansion of landlords Illiashenko's, there was occasionally a ghost of woman appearing in there. Locals explained it by the fact that one of the very old mansion owners was an extremely cruel man and engaged in people torture. Since the building of the manor was dismantled, under its basement was discovered a mass grave of excruciated people.

=== Soviet era ===
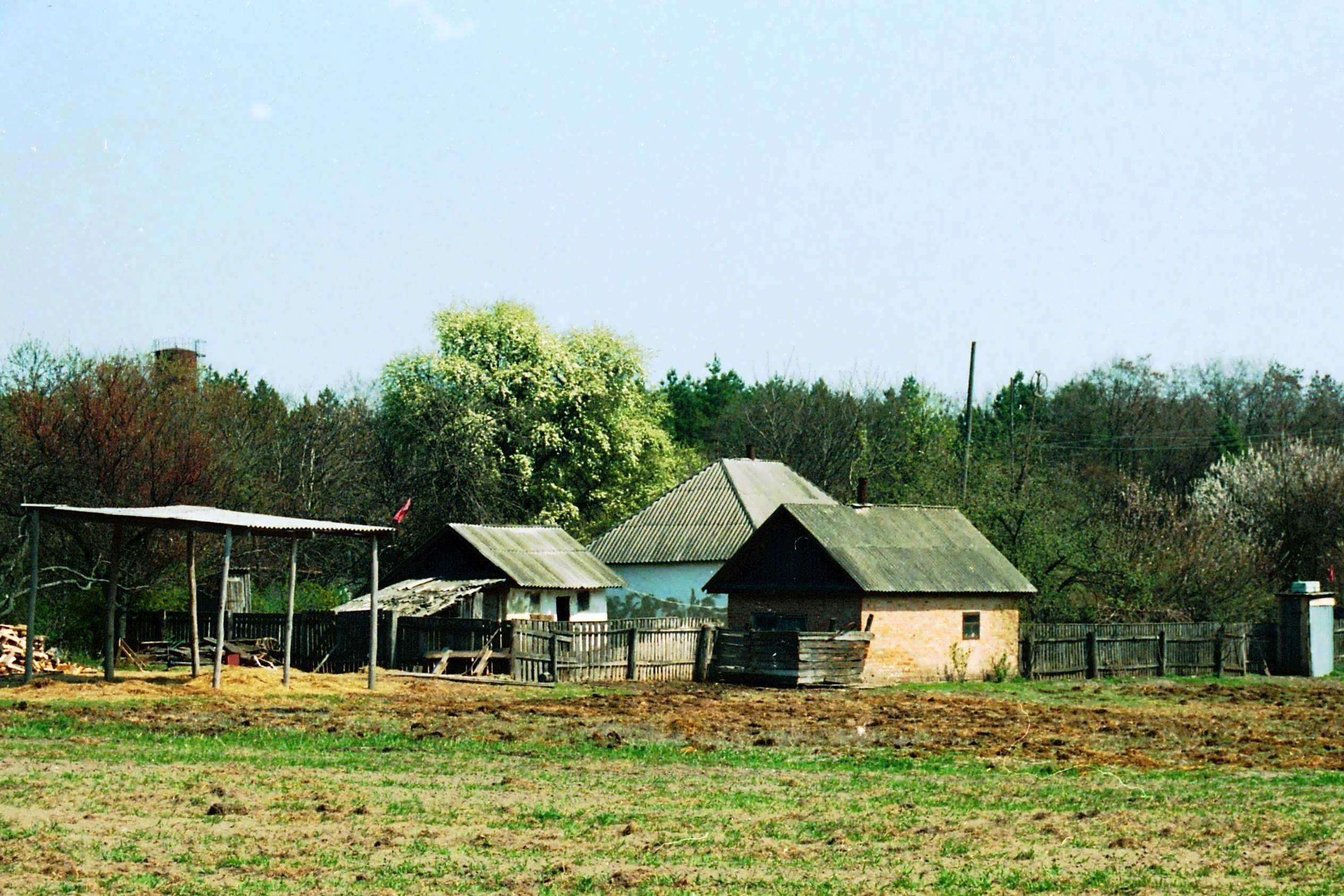
Some premises next to the forest.

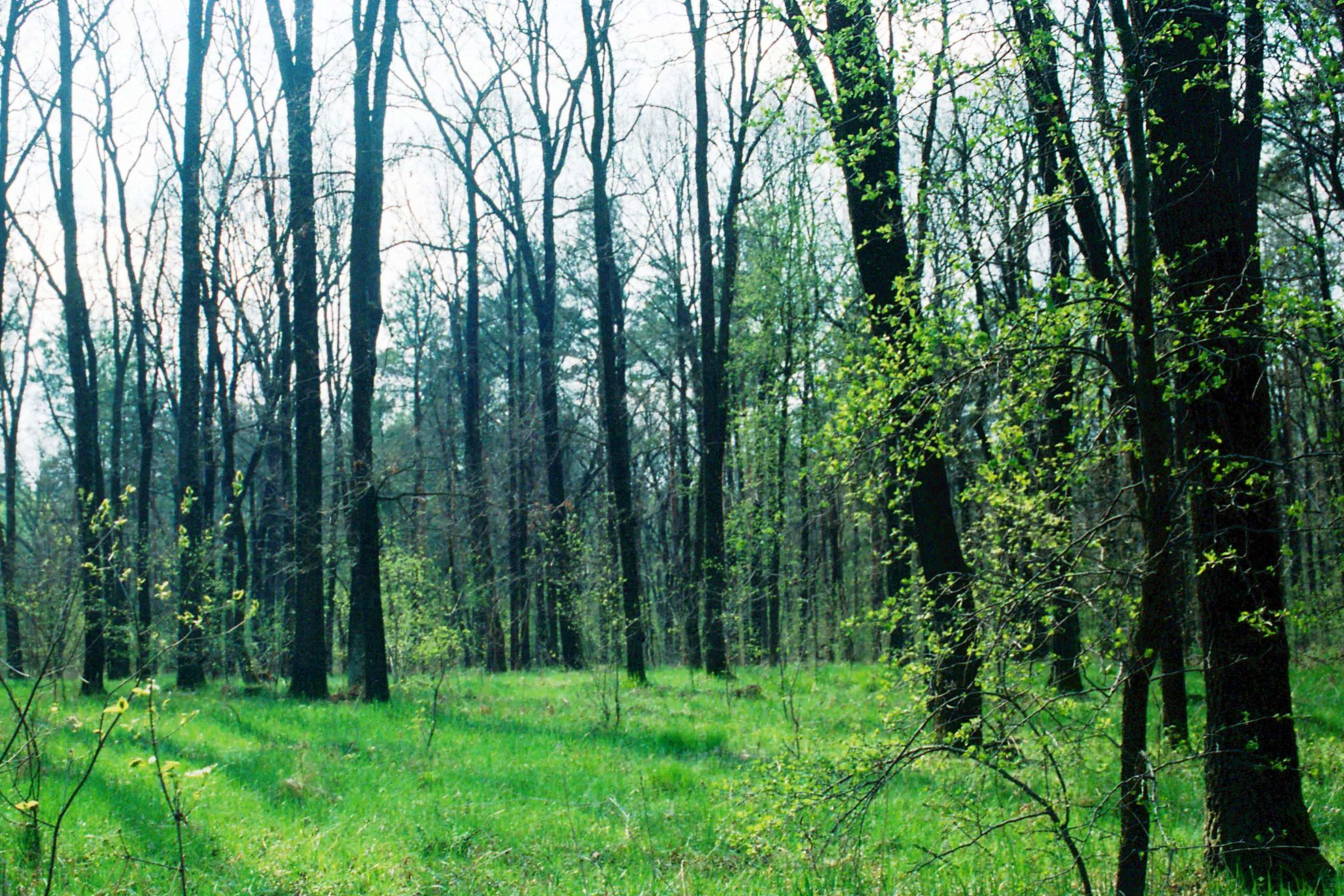
The oak forest near the village in April.

In 1921, there was a combat between a rebel detachment of otaman Chornyi (Black, Havrylo Kureda) and Bolshevik forces near the village, which was won by the rebels.

The soviet policy of collectivization in the Ukrainian Soviet Socialist Republic, that was attended by the Law of Spikelets, caused the Holodomor (Extermination by hunger) in the 1930s, which touched the village as well. Much later, in memory of the deceased there was a memorial erected, in the form of a Christian cross, in the village.

The first collective farm (kolhosp) named Perebudova (Perestroika, Reformation) was headed by I.O. Cherednichenko. The village church was reconstructed into a granary. After some time there was a school in the church building.

During the Political repression in the Soviet Union, especially in the Great Purge, a lot of villagers were being executed or deported. There were among others: L. Cherednichenko, T. Debely, Y. Ihnatenko, M. Suprun, H. Zavertainy.

At the time of World War II there were fierce combats near the village.

On 1 October 1941 a cult Soviet writer Arkady Gaidar stayed in the village, when he, together with a detachment of the colonel Orlov, was trying to get out of a German encirclement. Lurking from Germans in surrounding forests Gaidar managed to establish numerous relations with village inhabitants. Subsequently, Gaidar joined а Soviet partisan (guerrilla) group of Gorielov, which eventually was routed.

Besides Gorielov's squad, a partisan detachment in the name of Chapayev acted in the surrounding forests. Guerrillas wore policeman uniforms for secrecy. They did not do real hostilities, just fulfilled subversive activities.

On the pages of the regional press a native villager Volodymyr Sukhyna shares his memories about those times. In particular, he noted the atrocity of the Nazi commandant of the district centre Helmiaziv and the police chief. However, the village starosta (village head) Tykhon Dmytrovych tried to help the villagers. During the Red Army advance in 1943, the villagers fled away from the Dnieper river to avoid the accidental shelling from Kaniv. There was a military hospital opened in the former church, which had been used as a school at that time. The wounded were being taken in there during the Battle of the Dnieper. Killed and died of wounds Red Army soldiers were buried at the village cemetery, afterwards they were reburied in the village centre. Later at that place, a monument in memory of the Red Army warriors was erected.

The significant development of the village was undergoing in 1964–1967 years, when the collective farm head was P. P. Cherednyk. At this time there were new cattle farms, a tractor fleet, village club, and kindergarten built there. Later the collective farm was broke up, and its land was transferred to a state farm (radhosp). The state farm was named after Gaidar and had the head office at a nearby village Lipliave.

== Historical administrative subordination ==
The land of present Ozeryshche village belonged to the Khotsky Sotnia of the Pereiaslav Regiment of the Cossack Hetmanate. It is alleged that at that time there was a khutir called Ozeryshchi on that land.

After the Cossack Hetmanate dissolution the village land came into the Little Russia Governorate at first, and after its division, into the Poltava Governorate of the Russian Empire. It belonged to the Khotsky Volost of the Pereiaslav Povit (Uezd).

At the time of the Ukrainian People's Republic from 1918 to 1919 Ozeryshche was a part of the Pereiaslav Land according to the administrative division of Ukraine (1918).

After the Treaty on the Creation of the USSR in 1922, the village came into the Helmiaziv Raion of the Zolotonosha Okruha of the Ukrainian Soviet Socialist Republic. In 1925, the Helmiaziv Raion together with Ozeryshche village went to the Cherkasy Okruha. After the formation of the Kiev Oblast, the village belonged to it.

During the Nazi occupation of 1941-1943 the Helmiaziv Raion was in the Zolotonosha Gebiet of the Kiev General Okruha of the Reichskommissariat Ukraine.

By 1963, the village continued to be a part of Helmiaziv Raion, which belonged to the Kiev Oblast until 1937, then to the Poltava Oblast up to 1954. After the Helmiaziv Raion dissolution, Ozeryshche briefly moved to Drabiv Raion and since 1965 has been a part of Kaniv Raion of Cherkasy Oblast. The raion was abolished on 18 July 2020 as part of the administrative reform of Ukraine, which reduced the number of raions of Cherkasy Oblast to four. The area of Kaniv Raion was merged into Cherkasy Raion.

Until 1989 Ozeryshche village subordinated the neighbouring Lipliave village council.

== Businesses ==
- There are poultry farms of Myronivka's Khliboprodukt corporation, that produces poultry foodstuffs of "Nasha Riaba" brand, on the land between Ozeryshche and Lipliave village.

Others:

- General Kosovets agricultural LTD
- Ozeryshche AGRO-ROS LTD
- Agrofirma Ozeryshchenska LTD
- Agrofirma Livoberezhna Privately held company
- MTV farm
- Demetra farm
- Fortuna farm

== Prominent people ==
- K.L. Shablevska - a holder of the Order of the Red Banner of Labour.
- K.Y. Borzova - a holder of the Order of Friendship of Peoples.
- V.I. Bondar - a holder of the Order of Labour Glory.
- V.F. Khrolenko - a holder of the Order of Labour Glory.
- V.K. Chupryna - a veteran of World War II, who celebrated his 100th anniversary in 2015.
