= Shpola Raion =

Former subdivision of Cherkasy Oblast, Ukraine

Shpola Raion Шполянський район
- Raion
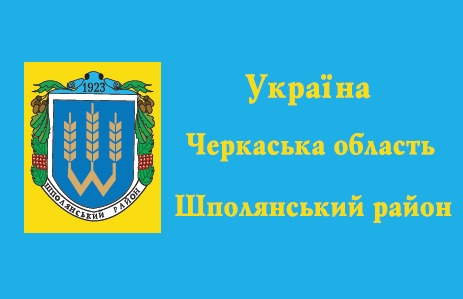
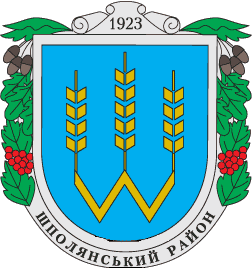
- Flag Coat of arms

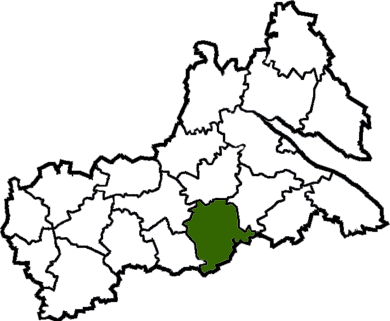
- Raion location in Cherkasy Oblast
- Coordinates: 48°57′34.8″N 31°25′42.5″E
- Country: Ukraine
- Oblast: Cherkasy Oblast
- Disestablished: 18 July 2020
- Admin. center: Shpola

Population (2020)
  - Total: 41,211
- Time zone: UTC+2 (EET)
  - Summer (DST): UTC+3 (EEST)

Shpola Raion (Ukrainian: Шполянський район) was a raion (district) of Cherkasy Oblast, central Ukraine. Its administrative centre was located at the town of Shpola. The raion was abolished on 18 July 2020 as part of the administrative reform of Ukraine, which reduced the number of raions of Cherkasy Oblast to four. The area of Shpola Raion was merged into Zvenyhorodka Raion. The last estimate of the raion population was 41,211 (2020 est.)

At the time of disestablishment, the raion consisted of three hromadas:

- Lypianka rural hromada with the administration in the selo of Lypianka;
- Matusiv rural hromada with the administration in the selo of Matusiv;
- Shpola urban hromada with the administration in Shpola.
