= Buzhanka =

Buzhanka Бужанка
- Village
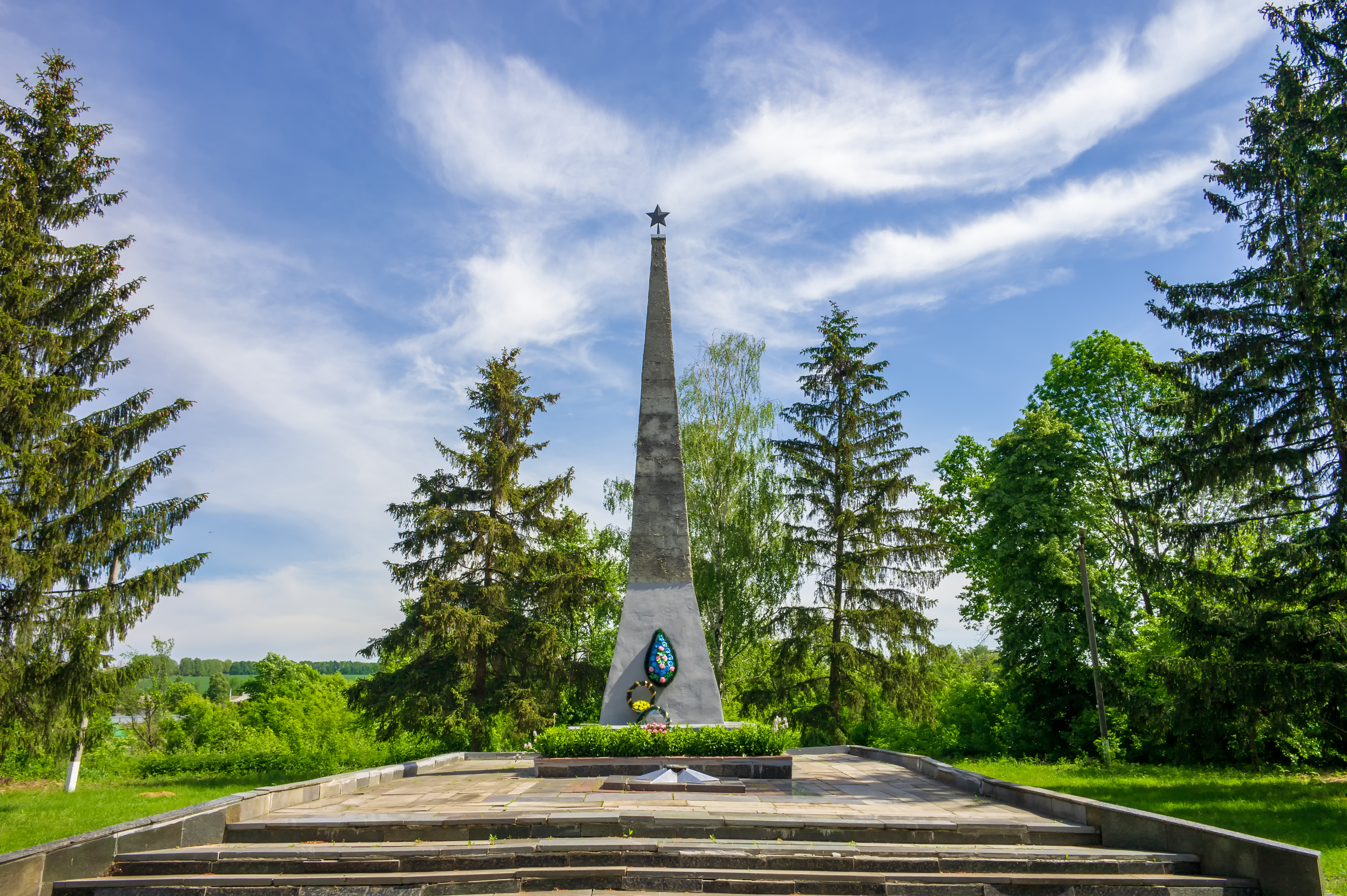
- Monument in town

- Location within Cherkasy Oblast Location within Ukraine
- Coordinates: 49°14′0″N 30°40′0″E
- Country: Ukraine
- Oblast (province): Cherkasy Oblast
- Raion (district): Zvenyhorodka Raion

Area
  - Total: 5.02 km^{2} (1.94 sq mi)
- Elevation: 161 m (528 ft)

Population (2001)
  - Total: 1,963
- Postal code: 19333

Buzhanka (Ukrainian: Бужанка) is a village of about 2000 in central Ukraine, located on the Hnylyi Tikych River, 24 kilometers northwest of the district capital Zvenyhorodka and 98 kilometers west of the oblast capital Cherkasy.

== Population ==
As of the 2001 census, Buzhanka had a population ‌of 1,963. 1,954 of whom indicated Ukrainian as their native language, 6 Russian, 1 Belarusian, and 2 other.

== History ==
The village was first mentioned in writing at the beginning of the 17th century.
