= Zvenyhorodka Raion =

Subdivision of Cherkasy Oblast, Ukraine

Zvenyhorodka Raion Звенигородський район
- Raion
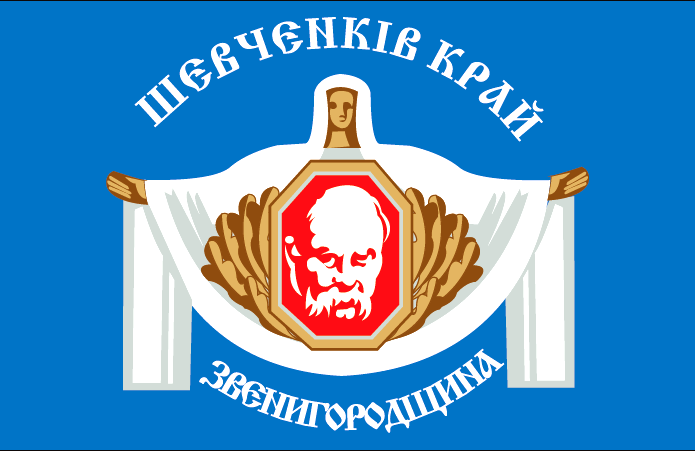
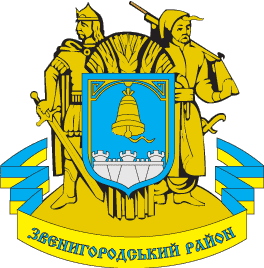
- Flag Coat of arms
- Raion location in Cherkasy Oblast
- Coordinates: 49°6′21.4″N 30°56′59.3″E
- Country: Ukraine
- Oblast: Cherkasy Oblast
- Admin. center: Zvenyhorodka
- Subdivisions: 17 hromadas

Population (2022)
  - Total: 193,804
- Time zone: UTC+2 (EET)
  - Summer (DST): UTC+3 (EEST)

Zvenyhorodka Raion is a raion (district) of Cherkasy Oblast, in central Ukraine. Its administrative centre is the city of Zvenyhorodka. Population: 193,804 (2022 estimate).

On 18 July 2020, as part of the administrative reform of Ukraine, the number of raions of Cherkasy Oblast was reduced to four, and the area of Zvenyhorodka Raion was significantly expanded. Four abolished raions, Katerynopil, Lysianka, Shpola, and Talne Raions, parts of two more abolished raions, Korsun-Shevchenkivskyi and Horodyshche Raions, as well as the city of Bahacheve, which was previously incorporated as a city of oblast significance and did not belong to any raion, were merged into Zvenyhorodka Raion. The January 2020 estimate of the raion population was 42,176 (2020 est.).

== Subdivisions ==
=== Current ===
After the reform in July 2020, the raion consisted of 17 hromadas:

- Buzhanka rural hromada with the administration in the selo of Buzhanka, transferred from Lysianka Raion;
- Katerynopil settlement hromada with the administration in the rural settlement of Katerynopil, transferred from Katerynopil Raion;
- Lypianka rural hromada with the administration in the selo of Lypianka, transferred from Shpola Raion;
- Lysianka settlement hromada with the administration in the rural settlement of Lysianka, transferred from Lysianka Raion;
- Matusiv rural hromada with the administration in the selo of Matusiv, transferred from Shpola Raion;
- Mokra Kalyhirka rural hromada with the administration in the selo of Mokra Kalyhirka, transferred from Katerynopil Raion;
- Selishche rural hromada with the administration in the selo of Selishche, transferred from Korsun-Shevchenkivskyi Raion;
- Shevchenkove rural hromada with the administration in the selo of Shevchenkove, retained from Zvenyhorodka Raion;
- Shpola urban hromada with the administration in the city of Shpola, transferred from Shpola Raion;
- Stebliv settlement hromada with the administration in the rural settlement of Stebliv, transferred from Korsun-Shevchenkivskyi Raion;
- Talne urban hromada with the administration in the city of Talne, transferred from Talne Raion;
- Vatutine urban hromada with the administration in the city of Bahacheve, transferred from Vatutine Municipality;
- Vilshana settlement hromada with the administration in the rural settlement of Vilshana, transferred from Horodyshche Raion;
- Vodianyky rural hromada with the administration in the selo of Vodianyky, retained from Zvenyhorodka Raion;
- Vynohrad rural hromada with the administration in the selo of Vynohrad, transferred from Lysianka Raion;
- Yerky settlement hromada with the administration in the rural settlement of Yerky, transferred from Katerynopil Raion;
- Zvenyhorodka urban hromada with the administration in the city of Zvenyhorodka, retained from Zvenyhorodka Raion.

=== Before 2020 ===
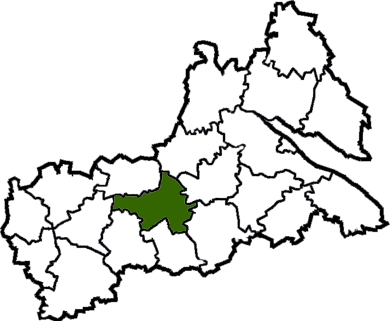
Zvenyhorodka Raion in Cherkasy Oblast (1966-2020)

Before the 2020 reform, the raion consisted of three hromadas:

- Shevchenkove rural hromada with the administration in Shevchenkove;
- Vodianyky rural hromada with the administration in Vodianyky;
- Zvenyhorodka urban hromada with the administration in Zvenyhorodka.
