= Kostiantynivka, Cherkasy Raion, Cherkasy Oblast =

Village in Cherkasy Oblast, Ukraine

Kostiantynivka Костянтинівка
- Village
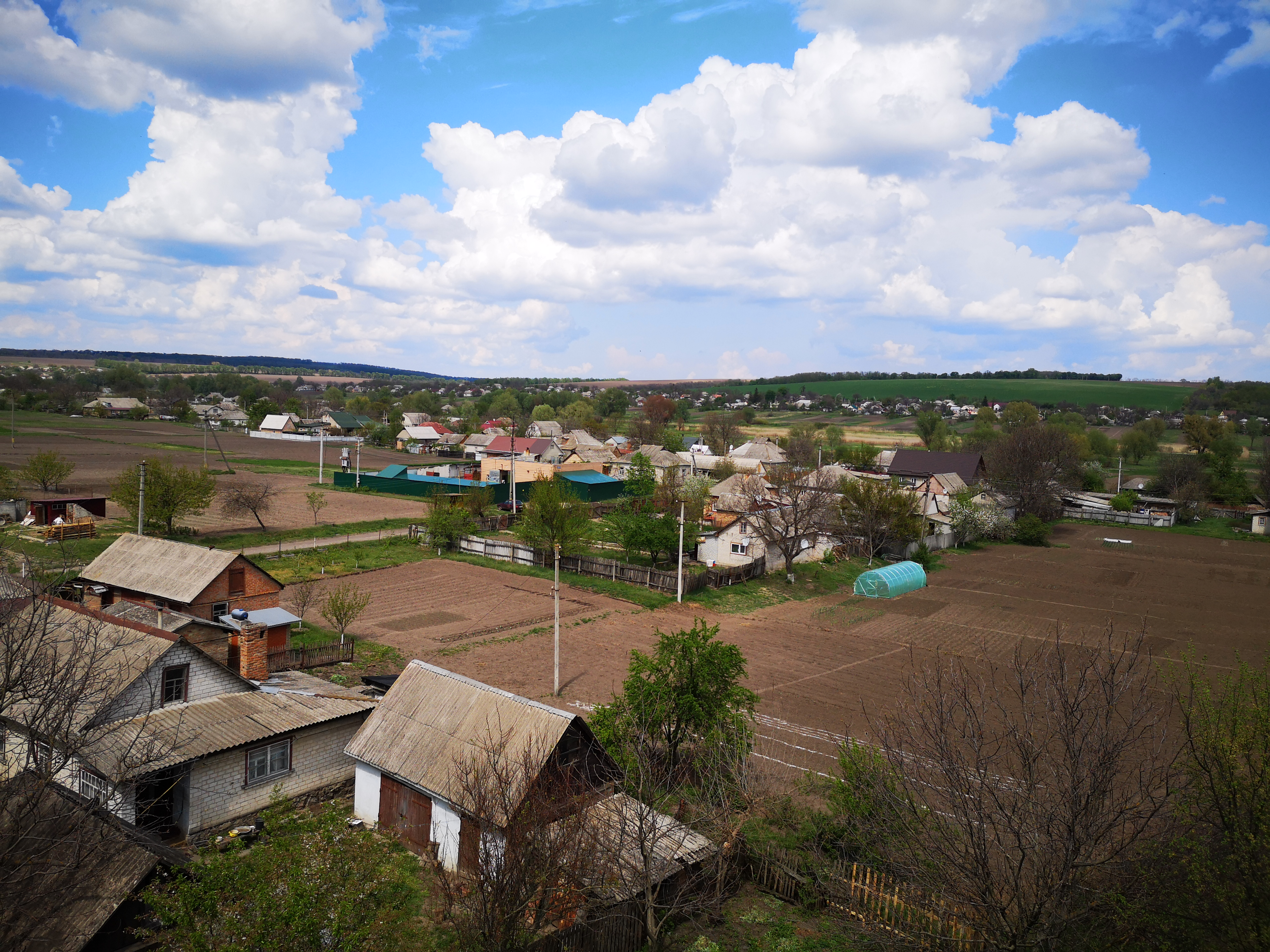

- Location of Kostiantynivka Kostiantynivka (Ukraine)
- Coordinates: 49°13′26″N 31°46′49″E
- Country: Ukraine
- Oblast: Cherkasy Oblast
- Raion: Cherkasy Raion
- Hromada: Balakleia rural hromada

Population (2001)
  - Total: 2,749
- Postal code: 20724
- Area code: +380 4733
- Climate: Cfa

Kostiantynivka (Ukrainian: Костянтинівка) is a village in Cherkasy Raion, Cherkasy Oblast (province) of Ukraine.

Kostiantynivka was previously located in the Smila Raion. The raion was abolished on 18 July 2020 as part of the administrative reform of Ukraine, which reduced the number of raions of Cherkasy Oblast to four. The area of Smila Raion was merged into Cherkasy Raion.

== Population ==
=== Language ===
Distribution of the population by native language according to the 2001 census:

Language	Number	Percentage
Ukrainian	2 633	95.78%
Russian	110	4.00%
Other^{[a]}	6	0.22%
Total	2 749	100.00%

^{a} Those who did not indicate their native language or indicated a language that was native to less than 1% of the local population.
