= Irdynivka =

Irdynivka Ірдинівка
- Rural settlement
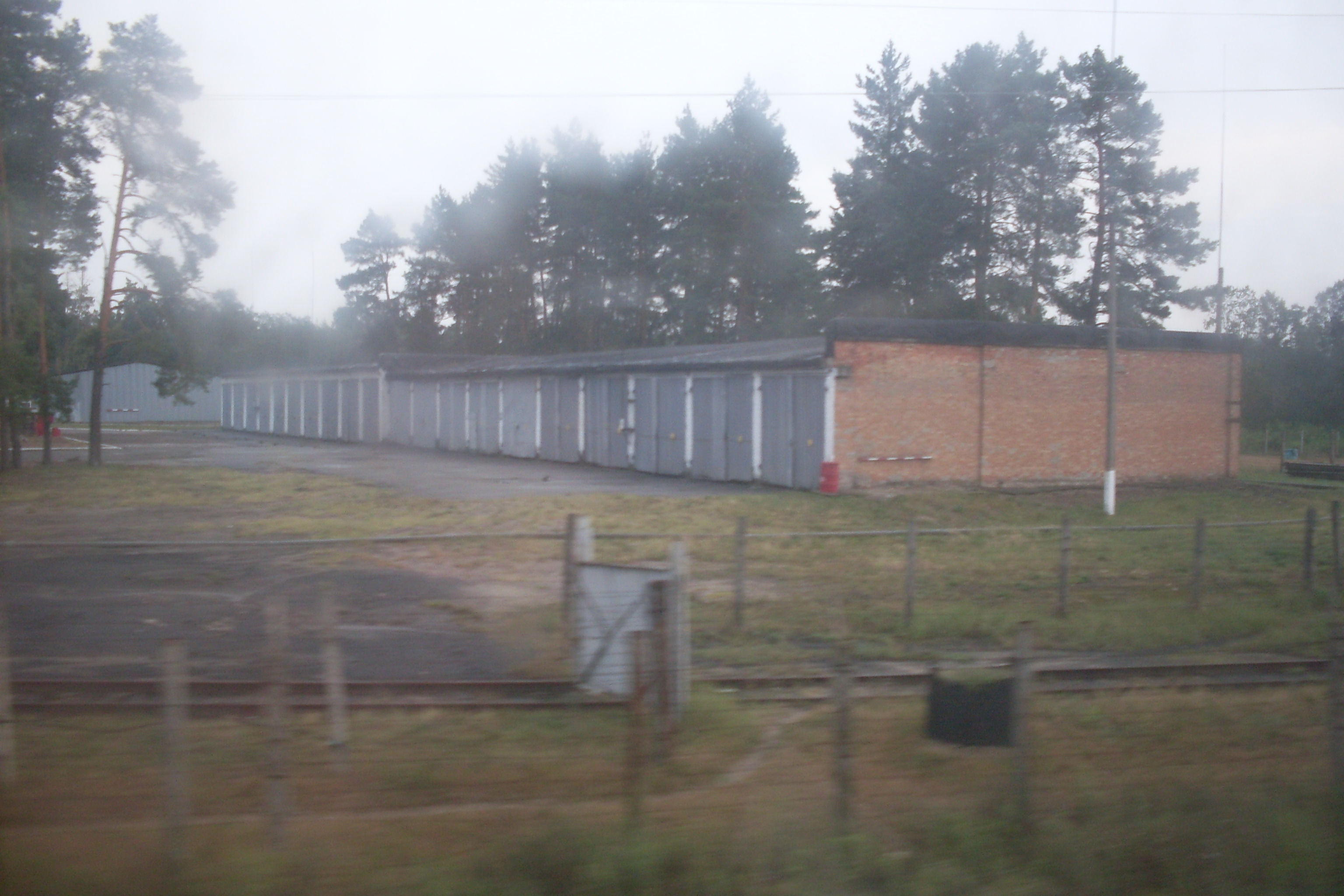
- Cherkas Ukraine.jpg

- Location of Irdynivka in Ukraine
- Coordinates: 49°15′35″N 31°53′17″E
- Country: Ukraine
- Oblast: Cherkasy Oblast
- Raion: Cherkasy Raion

Government

Population
  - Total: 39
- Time zone: UTC+2 (EET)
  - Summer (DST): UTC+3 (EEST)
- Postal code: 20700
- Area code: +380 4733
- Website: Settlement card

Irdynivka (Ukrainian: Ірдинівка) is a rural settlement in Cherkasy Raion of Cherkasy Oblast (province) in central Ukraine. It belongs to Bilozirya rural hromada, one of the hromadas of Ukraine. The settlement consists of only a small number of buildings and streets, and as of 2001 the population totalled 39 residents.

Irdynivka was subordinated under the Biloziria village council until 1985, following a transfer to the Smila city council which lasted until 18 July 2020. On this date, Smila was incorporated as a town of oblast significance and thereafter did not belong to any raion. In July 2020, as part of the administrative reform of Ukraine which reduced the number of raions of Cherkasy Oblast to four, the town of Smila (and thus Irdynivka) was merged into the Cherkasy Raion.

The settlement has no amenities and the nearest ones are located in nearby Smila, or on Highway H16. There is a single bus route servicing the area and a railway crossing is located on the outskirts, but no station exists. The River Irdyn, an offshoot of the Tiasmyn, flows south-west of Irdynivka. The name of the settlement most likely comes from the Ukrainisation of the German suffix -Hof ('courtyard'), perhaps following Polonization to -ówka, to Ukrainian -ivka, which is supported by the existence of nearby Irdyn and the river of the same name.

Political representation is managed as part of Smila city council and the current mayor is Ananko Sergey Vasilyevich.

== Population ==
=== Language ===
Distribution of the population by native language according to the 2001 census:

Language	Number	Percentage
Ukrainian	35	89.74%
Russian	3	7.69%
Other	1	2.57%
Total	39	100.00%

== Climate ==
Similar to the surrounding regions, Irdynivka has a temperate climate with 'significant' levels of precipitation.

Irdynivka

Climate chart (precipitation, max. and min. temperature)
J	F	M	A	M	J	J	A	S	O	N	D
42 −1 −6	37 1 −5	44 7 −1	44 15 5	57 21 12	72 25 16	64 27 18	44 26 17	56 20 12	44 13 6	44 6 2	45 1 −3
- █ Average max. and min. temperatures in °C
- █ Precipitation totals in mm
Imperial conversion
J	F	M	A	M	J	J	A	S	O	N	D
1.7 30 22	1.5 33 23	1.7 44 30	1.7 58 42	2.2 70 53	2.8 76 60	2.5 80 64	1.7 79 63	2.2 68 54	1.7 55 43	1.7 43 35	1.8 34 27
- █ Average max. and min. temperatures in °F
- █ Precipitation totals in inches
