= Tymoshivka =

Village in Cherkasy Oblast, Ukraine

Tymoshivka Тимошівка
- Village
- Location of Tymoshivka Tymoshivka (Ukraine)
- Coordinates: 48°58′20″N 32°04′00″E
- Country: Ukraine
- Oblast: Cherkasy Oblast
- Raion: Cherkasy Raion
- Council: Tymoshivka village council
- KOATUU: 7121886701
- Established: 17th century
- Founder: Timos Chumak

Population
  - Total: 811

Tymoshivka (Ukrainian: Тимошівка) is a village located in the Cherkasy Raion of Cherkasy Oblast, Ukraine. It is located 6 km south of Kamianka. As of 2009, the village has a population of 811. The selo belongs to Kamianka rural hromada, with the administration in the town of Kamianka.

Until 18 July 2020, Tymoshivka belonged to Kamianka Raion. The raion was abolished in July 2020 as part of the administrative reform of Ukraine, which reduced the number of raions of Cherkasy Oblast to four. The area of Kamianka Raion was merged into Cherkasy Raion.

== People ==
Karol Szymanowski was born in the village.
