= Mykhailivka rural hromada =

Mykhailivka rural hromada may refer to:

- Mykhailivka rural hromada, Cherkasy Oblast
- Mykhailivka rural hromada, Poltava Oblast
- Mykhailivka rural hromada, Zaporizhzhia Oblast

== See also ==
- Mykhailivka settlement hromada
