= Smila urban hromada =

Urban hromada of Cherkasy Oblast, Ukraine

Coordinates: 49°12′45″N 31°53′19″E

Smila urban hromada Смілянська міська громада
- Hromada
- Interactive map of Smila urban hromada
- Country: Ukraine
- Oblast: Cherkasy
- Raion: Cherkasy

Population (2020)
  - Total: 66,972
- Settlements: 2
- Cities: 1
- Rural settlements: 1
- Website: smila-rada.gov.ua

Smila urban territorial hromada (Ukrainian: Смілянська міська територіальна громада, romanized: Smilianska miska terytorialna hromada) is one of the hromadas of Ukraine, located in Cherkasy Raion in the country's Cherkasy Oblast. Its administrative centre is the city of Smila.

== Composition ==
In addition to one city (Smila), the hromada contains a single rural settlement: Irdynivka.
