= Constanta Airline =

Ukrainian airline

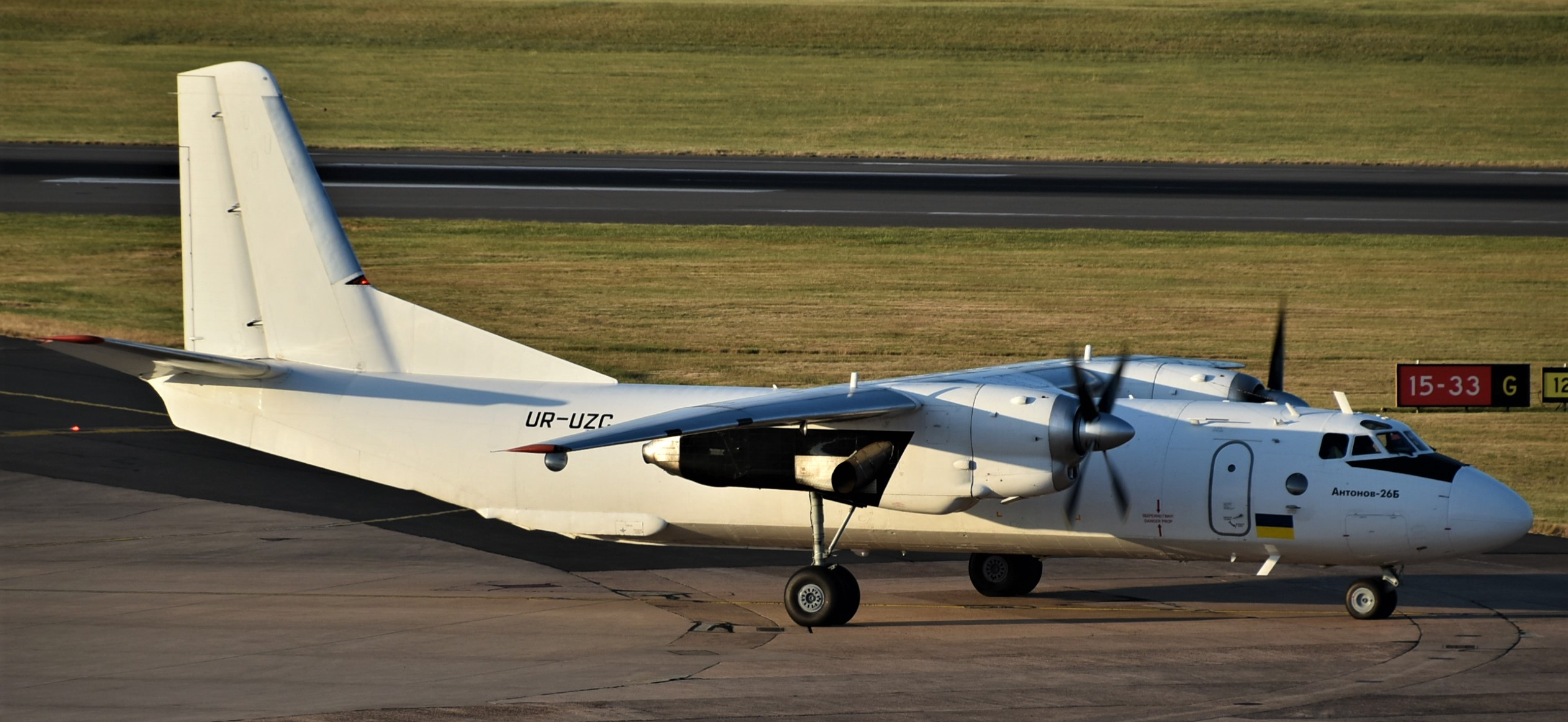
- A Constanta Airline Antonov An-26B
IATA	ICAO	Call sign
-	UZA	CONSTANTA
- Founded: 1998
- Operating bases: Roman Mileshko 78.00 % David L. Grange (USA) 10.00 % Jamie Anderson (United Kingdom) 5.00 % Ian Sperjen (Sweden) 5.00 %
- Fleet size: 12
- Destinations: charter
- Headquarters: Zaporizhzhia, Ukraine
- Employees: 242
- Website: constantaairline.com

Constanta Airline (Ukrainian: Авіакомпанія Константа) is a Ukrainian charter airline headquartered in Zaporizhzhia and based at Zaporizhzhia International Airport. Aircompany Constanta works with global organizations and government programs in challenging environments. The company operates in various regions, including Somalia, the Democratic Republic of the Congo, South Sudan, Slovakia, and Turkey.

== History ==
Constanta was founded as a private company in 1998 in Zaporizhzhia to operate both passenger and cargo operations, based on Ukraine International Airlines as a result of privatization. In 2016, the company faced bankruptcy and was preparing for liquidation. At that time, the staff included only 34 people, and there were no pilots. The fleet had of five Yak-40 aircraft, which were nearly unusable.

In December 2016, AP Holdings Limited from the UAE acquired a 99.8116% stake in Constanta's share capital. Following this acquisition, the fleet was expanded with Antonov An-26 and An-26-100 aircraft. By 2018, AP Holdings Limited owned 100% of the company's shares.

In June 2024, Constanta received permission from the US Federal Aviation Administration (FAA) to fly to, from and in transit through the US.

Since 2021, Roman Mileshko owned 98% of the shares in Constanta, while Mikhail Moiseenko holds the remaining 2%.

The company started flying to the EU, Africa, and the Middle East. The main activity was providing cargo, passenger, and air ambulance services to dangerous areas and in harsh climatic conditions.

By the end of 2021, Constanta was working on four long-term contracts with the UN and had three short-term contracts.

According to the order of the Vice Prime Minister - Minister of Community Development, Territories and Infrastructure of Ukraine No. 666 of August 4, 2023, Constanta is recognized as a critical enterprise for the functioning of the economy and ensuring the livelihoods of the population. Earlier, on July 27, 2023, the Ministry of Communities, Territories and Infrastructure of Ukraine also recognized Constanta as an operator of critical infrastructure in the air transport sector.

On April 25, 2024, Constanta re-elected its supervisory board for a three-year term, appointing retired U.S. Army Major General David L. Grange as the new Chairman. Grange David has served in the United States Army who served for 30 years and participated in several major military operations, including in Vietnam, Grenada, Iraq, Bosnia, and Kosovo, as well as missions in Latin and South America and the Middle East. In Ukraine, he is known as a co-founder of the Osprey Global Solutions Ukraine foundation, which has organized and conducted training for Ukrainian military personnel in demining, explosive device disposal, and NATO-standard medical assistance.

In 2024, Constanta's shareholders also included David L. Grange (USA) - 10% of shares, Jamie Anderson (UK, a logistics expert with over 15 years of experience in the British Army in organizing food supplies to countries affected by military conflicts or crises) and Ian Spergen (Sweden, a former officer of the Swedish Armed Forces, entrepreneur and security expert, CEO of JHOC in Sweden) - 5% of shares, respectively. Roman Mileshko remains the main shareholder of the airline with a 78% stake.

According to YouControl, Constanta is among the top 10 largest airlines in Ukraine.

== Fleet ==
=== Current fleet ===
Constanta Airline operates the following aircraft:

Aircraft	In service	Orders	Notes
Boeing 737-300SF	1	—	Leased from World Star Aviation.
Antonov An-74	3	—	
Antonov An-32P	2	—	Aerial firefighting aircraft.
Antonov An-26	6	—	
Total	12	0	

In collaboration with SE Antonov, Ivchenko-Progress, Motor Sich, and other Ukrainian companies, the airline has built the necessary certification and technical base to restore and modernize Antonov aircraft. Additionally, Constanta's aircraft are certified by EASA, FAA, and UK CAA, which are major civil aviation regulators.

The company holds several certificates of conformity, including ISO 9001:2015 for quality management, as well as certifications for quality and conformity control systems that meet EU technical requirements, maintenance organization quality control systems (Part-145), and airworthiness management organization quality control systems (Part-M).

During 2022-2023, Constanta achieved a SAFA score of zero, indicating a high level of flight safety.

The company has a representative office and a maintenance base certified by the State Aviation Administration of Ukraine in Trencin, Slovakia. It also operates approved line maintenance stations in Maribor (Slovenia), Dalaman (Turkey), Juba (South Sudan), Mogadishu (Somalia), and Goma (Democratic Republic of the Congo).

Aircompany Constanta offers several aviation services. They provide combined passenger and cargo flights and transport vehicles like boats and light 4X4 cars. The company can load non-standard cargo from the rear and assist with air medical evacuations. They fly to remote airports and unpaved runways and use short takeoff and landing techniques. They also deliver bulk fuel using the BATT system or barrels and transport non-standard and dangerous goods, including fuel by tanker.

== Accidents and incidents ==
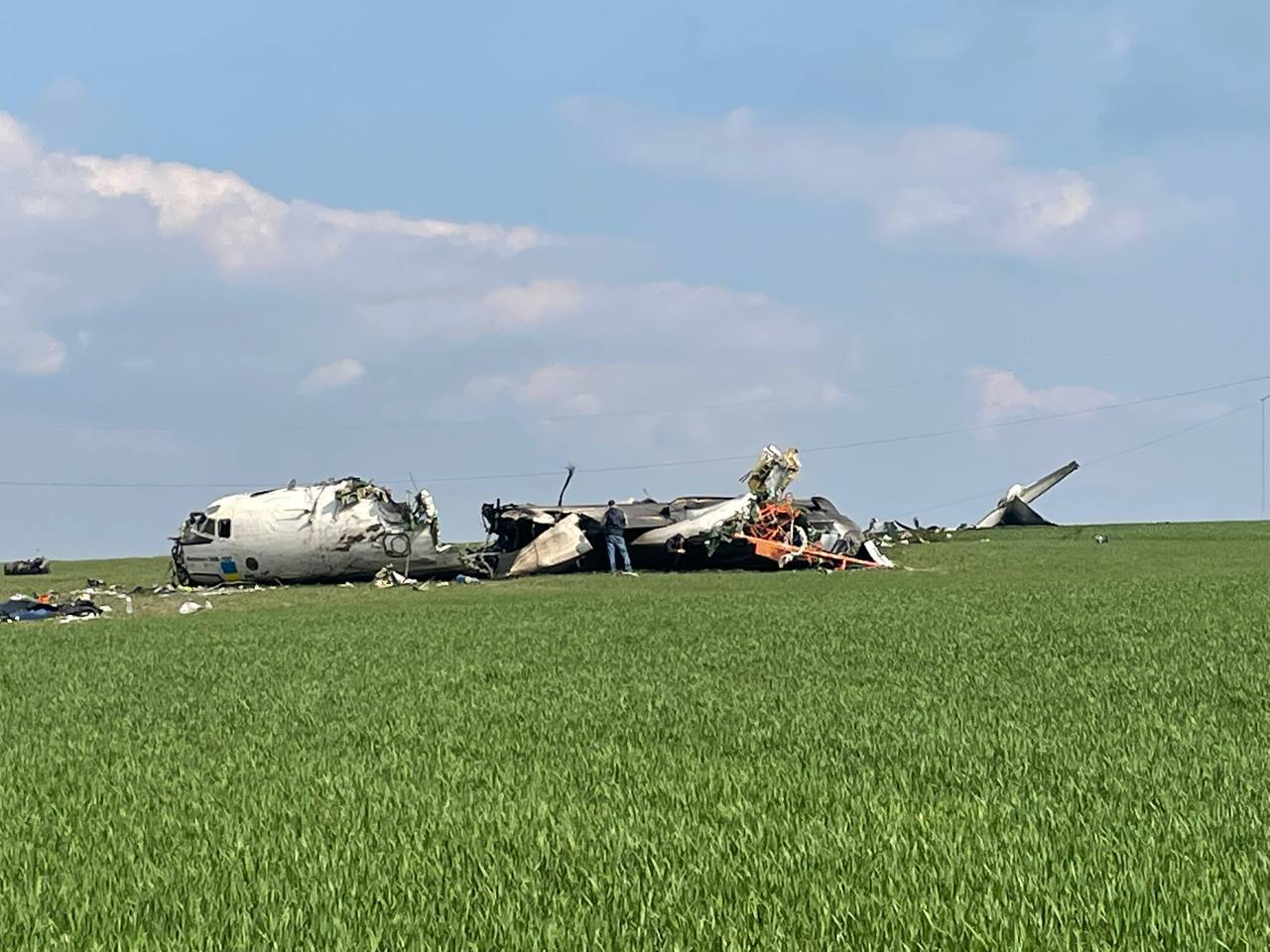
Wreckage of the Antonov An-26B-100, registration UR-UZB near Mykhailivka, Ukraine.

- On 26 May 2014, Yak-40 UR-MMK was destroyed while parked on the ramp during hostilities at Donetsk International Airport.
- On 22 April 2022, An-26B-100 UR-UZB departing Zaporozhye bound for Uzhgorod crashed after striking powerlines near Mykhailivka, Zaporizhzhia Raion, Zaporizhzhia Oblast, Ukraine. One of the three crew members were killed. The cause of the crash was determined to be the flight crews decision to carry out a flight under VFR conditions in foggy weather at low altitude.
- On 23 October 2025, An-26 UR-CEP operating for the United Nations Humanitarian Air Service from Rubkona to Bor in South Sudan landed short of the runway threshold at Bor Airport. As a result, the aircraft bounced on impact with the ground suffered damage to its landing gear as a result.
