= Smila Raion =

Former subdivision of Cherkasy Oblast, Ukraine

Smila Raion Смілянський Район
- Raion
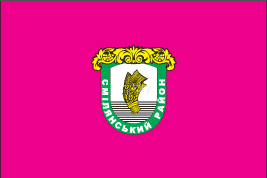
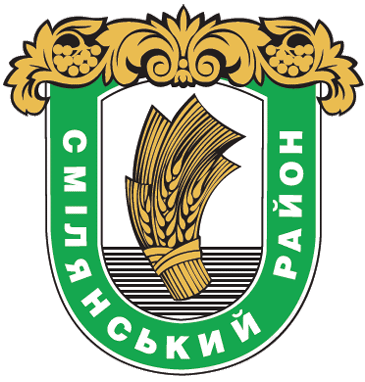
- Flag Coat of arms

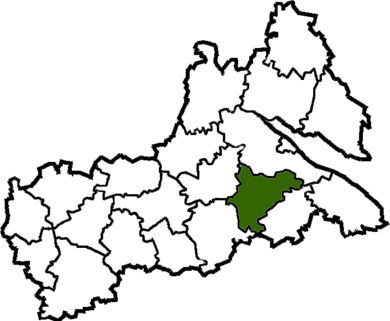
- Coordinates: 49°9′6.6″N 31°48′44″E
- Country: Ukraine
- Region: Cherkasy Oblast
- Established: March 7, 1923
- Disestablished: 18 July 2020
- Admin. center: Smila
- Subdivisions: List: — city councils; — settlement councils; — rural councils; Number of localities: — cities; — urban-type settlements; 32 — villages; — rural settlements

Government
  - Governor: Zaytsev Sergiy Anatolievych

Area
  - Total: 934 km^{2} (361 sq mi)

Population (2020)
  - Total: 31,264
  - Density: 33.5/km^{2} (86.7/sq mi)
- Time zone: UTC+02:00 (EET)
  - Summer (DST): UTC+03:00 (EEST)
- Postal index: 20720—20762
- Area code: +380-4733
- Website: http://smilarda.org.ua/

Smila Raion (Ukrainian: Смілянський Район) was a raion in Cherkasy Oblast. Its administrative centre was located at the town of Smila which was incorporated separately as a city of oblast significance and did not belong to the raion. The raion was abolished on 18 July 2020 as part of the administrative reform of Ukraine, which reduced the number of raions of Cherkasy Oblast to four. The area of Smila Raion was merged into Cherkasy Raion. The last estimate of the raion population was: 31,264 (2020 est.)

At the time of disestablishment, the raion consisted of four hromadas:

- Balakleia rural hromada with the administration in the selo of Balakleia;
- Berezniaky rural hromada with the administration in the selo of Berezniaky;
- Rotmistrivka rural hromada with the administration in the selo of Rotmistrivka;
- Ternivka rural hromada with the administration in the selo of Ternivka.

== People ==
=== From Smila Raion ===
- Todos' Os'machka - poet
- Zinaida Dolotenko - politician

=== Associated ===
- Élie Metchnikoff - immunologist
