= Kamianka Raion =

Former subdivision of Cherkasy Oblast, Ukraine

Kamianka Raion Кам'янський район
- Raion
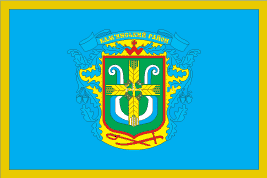
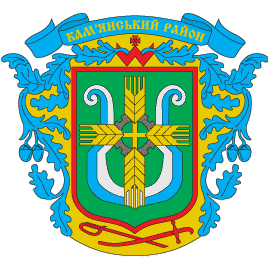
- Flag Coat of arms

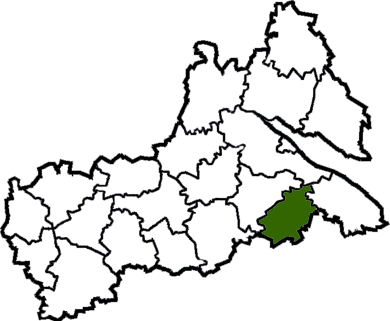
- Raion location in Cherkasy Oblast
- Coordinates: 49°2′32.8″N 32°2′59.4″E
- Country: Ukraine
- Oblast: Cherkasy Oblast
- Disestablished: 18 July 2020
- Admin. center: Kamianka

Population (2020)
  - Total: 25,767
- Time zone: UTC+2 (EET)
  - Summer (DST): UTC+3 (EEST)

Kamianka Raion (Ukrainian: Кам'янський район) was a raion (district) of Cherkasy Oblast, central Ukraine. Its administrative centre was located at the town of Kamianka. The raion was abolished on 18 July 2020 as part of the administrative reform of Ukraine, which reduced the number of raions of Cherkasy Oblast to four. The area of Kamianka Raion was merged into Cherkasy Raion. The last estimate of the raion population was 25,767 (2020 est.)

At the time of disestablishment, the raion consisted of two hromadas, Kamianka urban hromada with the administration in Kamianka and Mykhailivka rural hromada with the administration in the selo of Mykhailivka.
