= Rotmistrivka crater =

Coordinates: 49°08′50″N 31°42′30″E

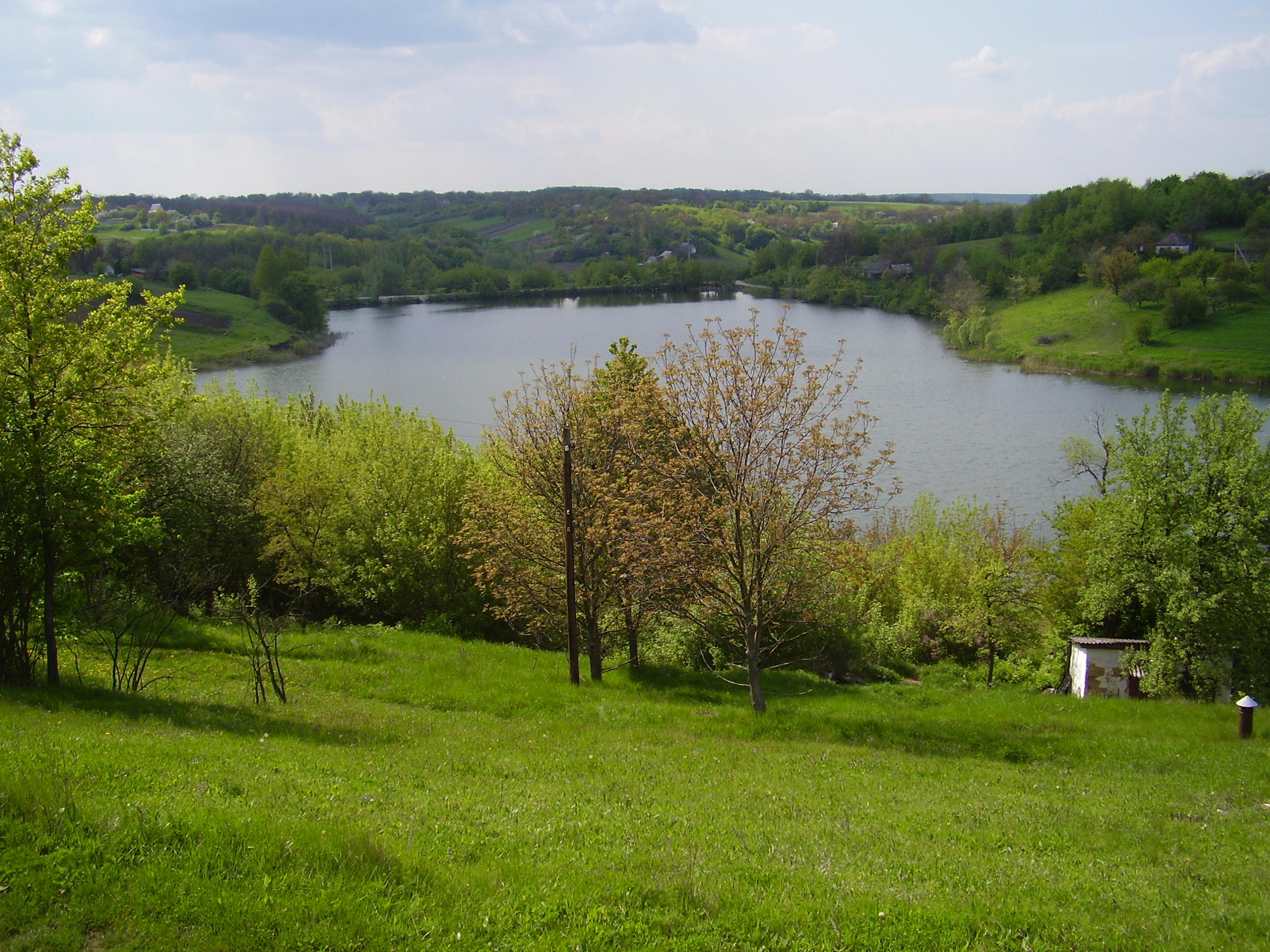
- Rotmistrivka
- Location: Rotmistrivka, Cherkasy Raion, Cherkasy Oblast, Ukraine

Impact crater structure
- Confidence: Confirmed
- Diameter: 2.7 kilometres (1.7 mi)
- Age: 120 ± 10 Ma
- Exposed: No
- Drilled: Yes

Rotmistrivka is an impact crater in Cherkasy Oblast, Ukraine, which is located near the village of Rotmistrivka.

The crater is 2.7 kilometres (1.7 mi) in diameter, with an age estimated at 120 ± 10 million years (Lower Cretaceous). It is not exposed to the surface, being buried beneath continental and marine sedimentary deposits. The crater contains a brecciated lens of granite fragments and particles of impact glass, overlain by shales, limestones and granite-derived sandstones of lower Cretaceous age.
