= Derenkovets =

Village in central Ukraine

Derenkovets Деренковець
- Village
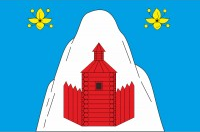
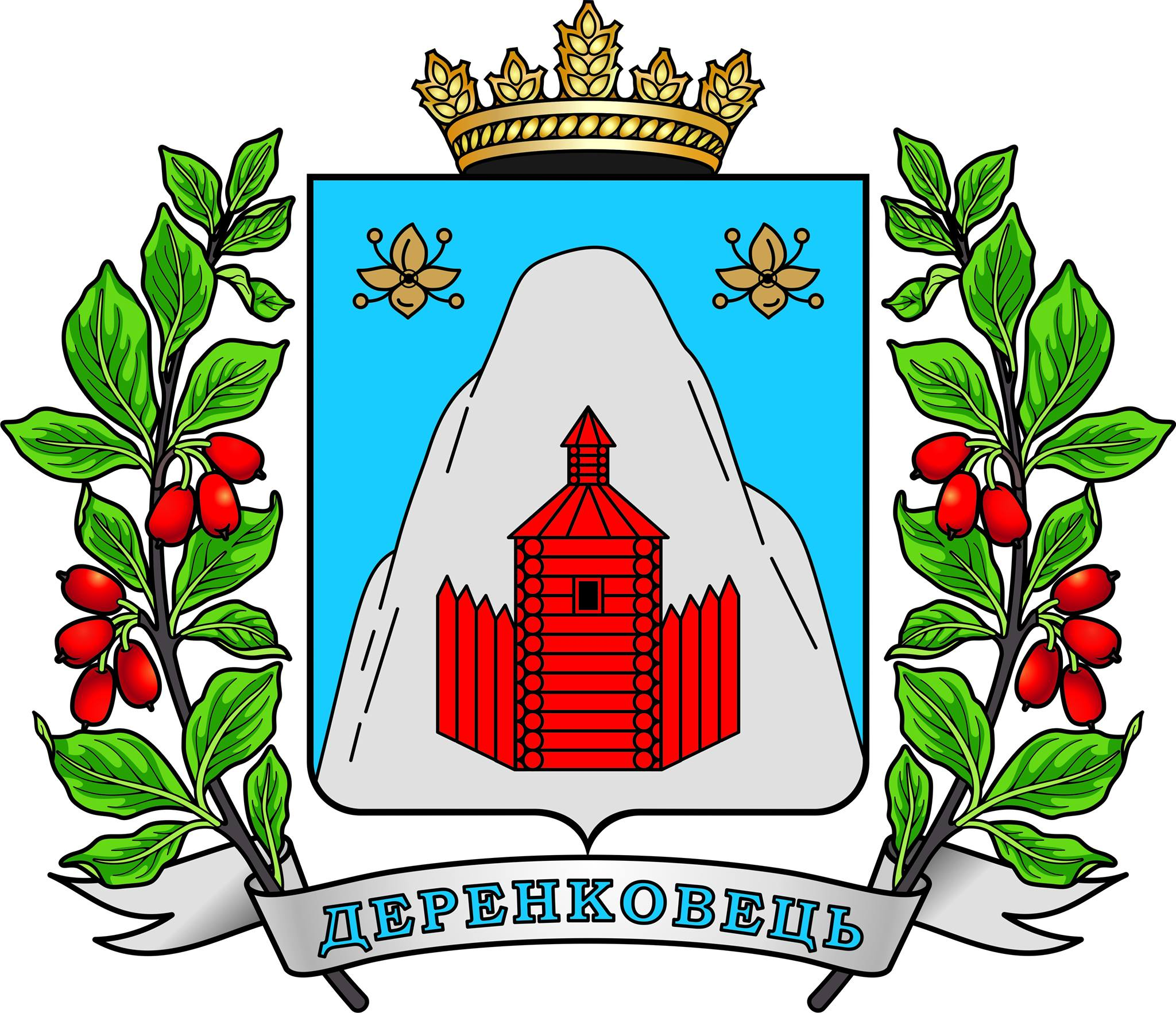
- Flag Seal

- Location within Cherkasy Oblast Location within Ukraine
- Coordinates: 49°25′5″N 31°28′0″E
- Country: Ukraine
- Oblast: Cherkasy Oblast
- Raion: Cherkasy Raion
- Hromada: Nabutiv rural hromada
- Founded: 1192 (as Dveren)

Population (2001)
  - Total: 1,778
- Postal code: 19430

Derenkovets is a village in Cherkasy Raion, Cherkasy Oblast, central Ukraine. It has a population of 1,778 residents.

== Geography ==
Derenkovets is situated on the bank of the Ros river, a right tributary of the Dnieper. The village experiences a humid continental climate.

== Demographics ==
The 1989 census of the Ukrainian Soviet Socialist Republic reported a population of 2,219 in the village. By the Ukrainian census of 2001, the population fell to 1,778.

=== Language ===
According to the 2001 census, 98.03% of residents spoke Ukrainian as their first language, 1.69% spoke Russian, 0.22% spoke Moldovan, and 0.06% spoke Belarusian.
