= Kaniv urban hromada =

Urban hromada of Cherkasy Oblast, Ukraine

Coordinates: 49°40′50″N 31°28′20″E

Kaniv urban hromada Канівська міська громада
- Hromada
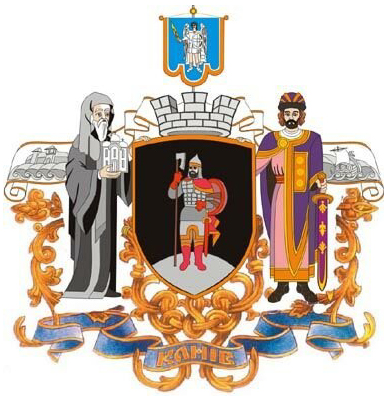
- Seal
- Interactive map of Kaniv urban hromada
- Country: Ukraine
- Oblast: Cherkasy
- Raion: Cherkasy

Area
  - Total: 54 km^{2} (21 sq mi)

Population (2018)
  - Total: 24,518
  - Density: 450/km^{2} (1,200/sq mi)
- Settlements: 11
- Cities: 1
- Villages: 10
- Website: kaniv-rada.gov.ua

Kaniv urban territorial hromada (Ukrainian: Канівська міська територіальна громада, romanized: Kanivska miska terytorialna hromada) is one of the hromadas of Ukraine, in Cherkasy Raion within Cherkasy Oblast. Its administrative centre is the city of Kaniv.

== Composition ==
In addition to one city (Kaniv), the hromada contains 10 villages:

- Babychi
- Hamarnia
- Khmilna
- Khutir-Khmilna
- Kononcha
- Luka
- Mezhyrich
- Mykhailivka
- Pekari
- Yabluniv
