= Irdyn =

Rural locality in Cherkasy Oblast, Ukraine

Irdyn Ірдинь
- Rural settlement
- Location of Irdyn in Ukraine Irdyn (Ukraine)
- Coordinates: 49°22′09″N 31°40′45″E
- Country: Ukraine
- Oblast: Cherkasy Oblast
- Raion: Cherkasy Raion
- Town status: 1941

Government
  - Mayor: Oleksandr Maksymov

Population (2022)
  - Total: 727
- Time zone: UTC+2 (EET)
  - Summer (DST): UTC+3 (EEST)
- Postal code: 19630
- Area code: +380 472

Irdyn (Ukrainian: Ірдинь) is a rural settlement in Cherkasy Raion, Cherkasy Oblast, central Ukraine. Population: 727 (2022 estimate).

The settlement belongs to Bilozirya rural hromada, with the administration in the selo of Bilozirya.

== History ==
Urban-type settlement was founded in 1930.

Until 26 January 2024, Irdyn was designated urban-type settlement. On this day, a new law entered into force which abolished this status, and Irdyn became a rural settlement.

== Population ==
In January 1989, the population was 1357 people.

In January 2013, the population was 865 people.

=== Language ===
Distribution of the population by native language according to the 2001 census:

Language	Number	Percentage
Ukrainian	1 001	95.52%
Russian	43	4.10%
Other^{[a]}	4	0.38%
Total	1 048	100.00%

^{a} Those who did not indicate their native language or indicated a language that was native to less than 1% of the local population.
