= Zinaida Dolotenko =

Soviet Ukrainian politician (born 1922)

- Зінаїда Долотенко
- Born: 1922
- Occupation: Politician
- Political party: Communist Party of Ukraine
- Honours: Order of Lenin

Zinaida Todosivna Dolotenko (Ukrainian: Зінаїда Тодосівна Долотенко; born 1922) was a Soviet politician, born in Samhorodok, Smila Raion, Ukrainian Soviet Socialist Republic.

== Biography ==
Dolotenko was born to a peasant family in 1922. In 1938, she graduated from a seven-year rural school. She was a member of the Komsomol.

Beginning in 1938, she started working as a laborer at the Shevchenko collective farm in the village of Samhorodok and achieved significant harvests of sugar beets.

During the Great Patriotic War she lived in her native village and continued working in agriculture. She later had to hide in a nearby area to avoid being taken by German soldiers to forcefully work as a fremdarbeiter in Nazi Germany. Since 1944, she became a member of the youth section and the board of the Shevchenko collective farm. In 1945, Dolotenko's unit grew 650 quintals of sugar beets from each hectare on an area of 7 hectares. She also grew high yields of millet.

After the war, she was elected a member of the Rotmistriv District Committee of the Kyiv Regional State Technical University of Ukraine. She was elected to the Supreme Soviet of the Ukrainian SSR in 1947, representing Kyiv Oblast. In 1951, the Central Committee of the Communist Party (Bolsheviks) of Ukraine recommended that she did not get re-elected, having been accused of low productivity of her agricultural brigade and being absent from meetings with her electorate.

== Personal life ==
In 1948 she married a man who was a "politically unreliable man who served the Germans during the Patriotic War."

== Honours ==
- Order of Lenin (March 1947)
- other medals
