= Kamianka urban hromada =

Urban hromada of Cherkasy Oblast, Ukraine

Coordinates: 48°58′40″N 32°03′00″E

Kamianka urban hromada Кам'янська міська громада
- Hromada
- Interactive map of Kamianka urban hromada
- Country: Ukraine
- Oblast: Cherkasy
- Raion: Cherkasy

Area
  - Total: 155.40 km^{2} (60.00 sq mi)

Population (2018)
  - Total: 13,203
  - Density: 84.961/km^{2} (220.05/sq mi)
- Settlements: 17
- Cities: 1
- Rural settlements: 3
- Villages: 13
- Website: kammiskrada.gov.ua

Kamianka urban territorial hromada (Ukrainian: Кам'янська міська територіальна громада, romanized: Kamianska miska terytorialna hromada) is one of the hromadas of Ukraine, in Cherkasy Raion within Cherkasy Oblast. Its administrative centre is the city of Kamianka.

== Composition ==
The hromada contains 17 settlements: 1 city (Kamianka), 3 rural settlements (Bohdanivske, Kalynivka, Kopiichana), and 13 villages:

- Balandyne
- Hrushkivka
- Katerynivka
- Kokhanivka
- Kosari
- Lebedivka
- Luzanivka
- Olianyne
- Radyvanivka
- Telepyne
- Tymoshivka
- Verbivka
- Yurchykha
