= Nabutiv rural hromada =

Coordinates: 49°28′N 31°24′E

Nabutiv rural hromada Набутівська сільська громада
- Hromada
- Interactive map of Nabutiv rural hromada
- Country: Ukraine
- Oblast: Cherkasy
- Raion: Cherkasy

Area
  - Total: 217.8 km^{2} (84.1 sq mi)

Population (2025)
  - Total: 5,816
  - Density: 26.70/km^{2} (69.16/sq mi)
- Settlements: 13
- Villages: 13
- Website: nabutivska-gromada.gov.ua

Nabutiv rural hromada is a hromada in the Cherkasy Raion of Cherkasy Oblast of Ukraine. Its administrative centre is the village of Nabutiv.

== Composition ==
The hromada consists of 13 villages:

- Brovakhy
- Buda-Brovakhivska
- Chevrone
- Derenkovets
- Drabivka
- Kornylivka
- Kychyntsi
- Miroshnykivka
- Nabutiv (administrative centre)
- Neterebka
- Paskiv
- Sakhnivka
- Sakhnivske
