= Smila =

City in Cherkasy Oblast, Ukraine

Smila Сміла
- City
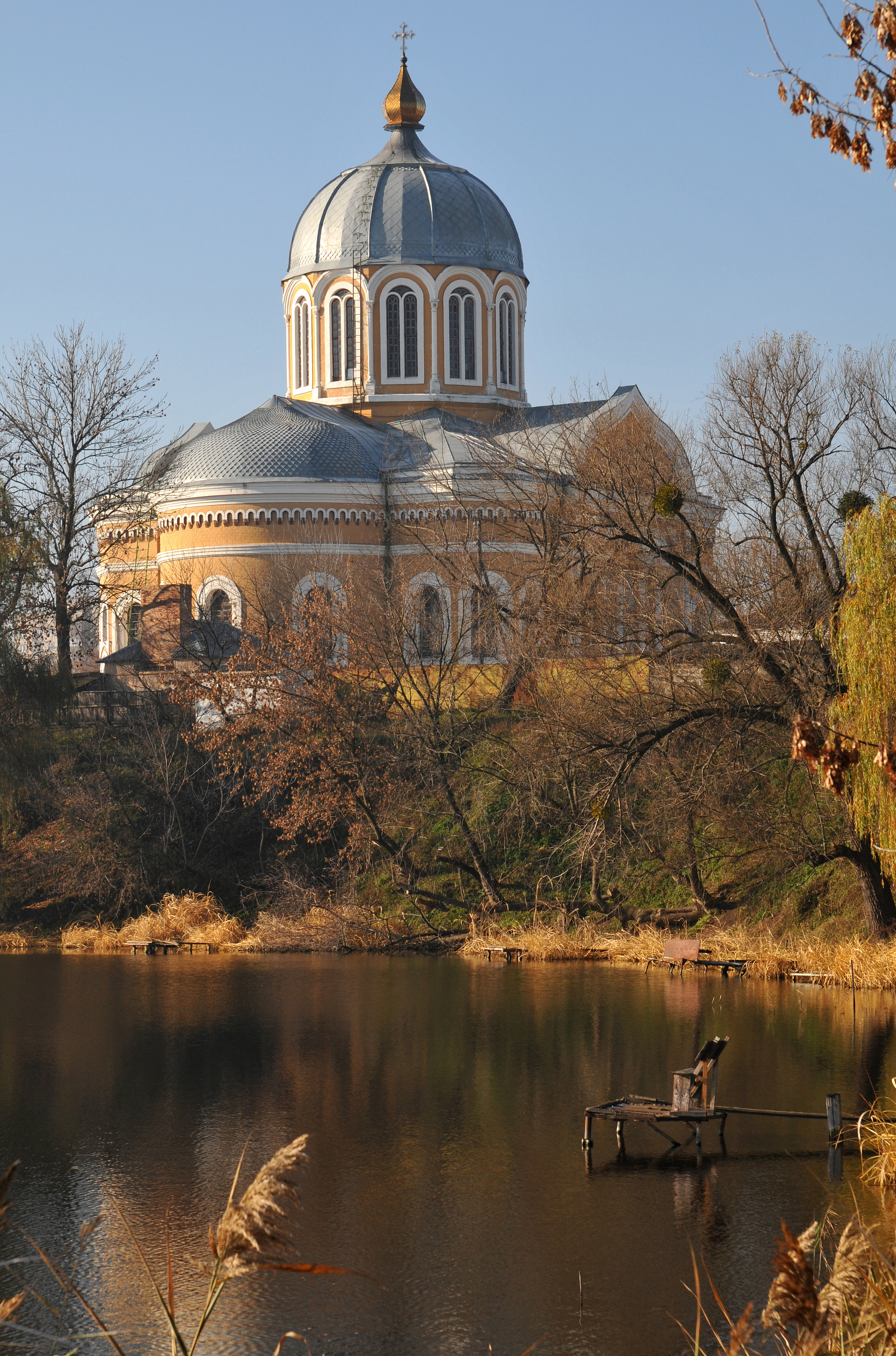
- The Cathedral of the Intercession of the Theotokos

- Flag Coat of arms

- Location of Smila Smila (Ukraine)
- Coordinates: 49°14′01″N 31°52′56″E
- Country: Ukraine
- Oblast: Cherkasy Oblast
- Raion: Cherkasy Raion
- Hromada: Smila urban hromada
- Founded: 1542
- City status: 1926

Government
  - Mayor: Mr. Serhiy Ananko

Area
  - Land: 39.85 km^{2} (15.39 sq mi)
- Elevation: 101 m (331 ft)

Population (2022)
  - Total: 65,675
  - Estimate (2023): 66,481
  - Density: 1,648/km^{2} (4,268/sq mi)
- Time zone: UTC+2 (EET)
  - Summer (DST): UTC+3 (EEST)
- Postal code: 20700
- Area code: +380 4733
- Sister cities: Bahacheve, Irpin, Jonava, Kovel, Newton, Vadul lui Vodă
- Website: smila-rada.gov.ua

Smila (Ukrainian: Сміла [ˈs⁽ʲ⁾milɐ]) is a city located on Dnieper Upland near the Tyasmyn River, in Cherkasy Raion, Cherkasy Oblast of Ukraine. The Tiasmyn River, a tributary of the Dnieper River, flows through the city. In January 2022, the estimated population was 65,675.

== Geography ==
=== Climate ===
The climate in Smila is moderately continental. Winters are cold with frequent snow. Summers are warm and can be hot in July, with little rain. Periods of temperatures higher than +10 last up to 170 days. The average annual precipitation is 450–520 mm.

== History ==
Smila arose from an early Cossack settlement founded in the late 16th century. First mentioned in the early 17th century, between 1648 and 1667 Smila was a sotnia town of Chyhyryn Regiment. It later came under Polish rule. Under the administration of Poland it was owned by the noble Lubomirski family. In 1759 and 1760 the city and its castle were attacked and captured by haidamaks. In 1773 Polish king Stanisław August Poniatowski granted Smila with Magdeburg Rights.

In 1787 the town was sold by its owner Ksawery Lubomirski to Grigory Potemkin, a favourite of empress Catherine II of Russia. After Potemkin's death, Smila came under control of count Alexander Samoylov. In 1793, following the Second Partition of Poland, it became part of the Russian Empire, and starting from 1797 belonged to Cherkasy povit.

In 1821 Samoylov's daughter Sofia married prince Alexei Bobrinsky, as a result of which Smila became part of the latter's property. In 1838 a sugar factory was established in the town by its owner. By 1864 it produced up to 250,000 poods of sugar annually. In 1879, factory production in Smila exceeded the industrial output of Kyiv. As a result of the industrial boom, between 1847 and 1890 the town's population increased almost fourfold.

On 23 November (N.S. 8 December) 1876 railway link to Bobrynska (now Tarasa Shevchenka) station was opened, connecting Smila with Cherkasy, Fastiv and Znamianka. The station would eventually become the headquarters of Southwestern Railways.

Jews had settled in Smila since the 18th century and at the turn of the 20th century they made up over half the population and owned most of the shops. Only a handful of Jews remain in Smila today. In 1881, 1883, and 1904 there were pogroms in Smila, during which several Jews lost their lives and much Jewish property was looted or destroyed.

Construction of the Fastiv-Znamianka railway line spurred industrial growth in Smila. In 1910, the town had 23 factories and a population of 29,000. In 1930 a machine building factory was established.

During the Second World War, the Wehrmacht deployed Stalag 345 near Smila to hold Soviet prisoners of war. The camp was kept near Smila from early 1941 until December 1943, when the camp was moved to Zagreb.

In 1957, the machine repairs factory established in 1930 was repurposed to produce new machinery. The plant produced machines for food and transportation industries, and in 1972 it employed over a thousand workers.

Until 18 July 2020, Smila was designated as a city of oblast significance and served as the administrative center of Smila Raion though it did not belong to the raion. The settlements of Ploske and Irdynivka were subordinated to Smila city council. As part of the administrative reform of Ukraine, which reduced the number of raions of Cherkasy Oblast to four, the city was merged into Cherkasy Raion.

During the Russian invasion of Ukraine, Russian air strikes started a large fire within the city in October, 2022. Air raid sirens sounded in the city as early as March, 2022. A nearby Ukrainian fuel depot containing 100,000 tonnes of fuel was blown up the next day.

== Population ==
In thousands
1845	1860	1897	1926	1939	1959	1970	1979	1989	2001	2012	2021
8000	12 600	15 200	23 000	34 000	44 534	55 474	62 282	79 449	69 681	68 667	66,475

In 1989 the population of Smila was 77,500. The town's population has generally declined since the 1980s. In January 2022, the estimated population was 65,675, a 1.2% decrease from 2021.

=== Language ===
Distribution of the population by native language according to the 2001 census:

Language	Number	Percentage
Ukrainian	61 186	89.10%
Russian	6 956	10.13%
Other^{[a]}	529	0.77%
Total	68 671	100.00%

^{a} Those who did not indicate their native language or indicated a language that was native to less than 1% of the local population.

== Economy ==
The economic emphasis is on mechanical engineering, and the food industry is also important. On the eve of World War I sugar production in Smila reached 1,5 million poods (c. 25,000 tons), further growing to 37,000 tons during the 1970s. However, by 1999 it had decreased to only 8,000 tons.

Smila is the transport hub for the surrounding region. Smila is where the Kyiv–Dnipro and Odesa–Russia rail routes cross, making Smila one of the most important railway junctions in Ukraine. The large station at the junction is named after Ukraine's national poet and artist, Taras Shevchenko.

== Notable people ==
- Samuel (Shmuel) Malavsky – сantor.
- Oleksandr Kovpak – football player.
- Genia Averbuch – architect.

== Twin towns – sister cities ==
Smila is twinned with:

- Bahacheve, Ukraine
- Irpin, Ukraine
- Jonava, Lithuania
- Kovel, Ukraine
- Newton, Iowa, United States
- Vadul lui Vodă, Moldova

== Gallery ==
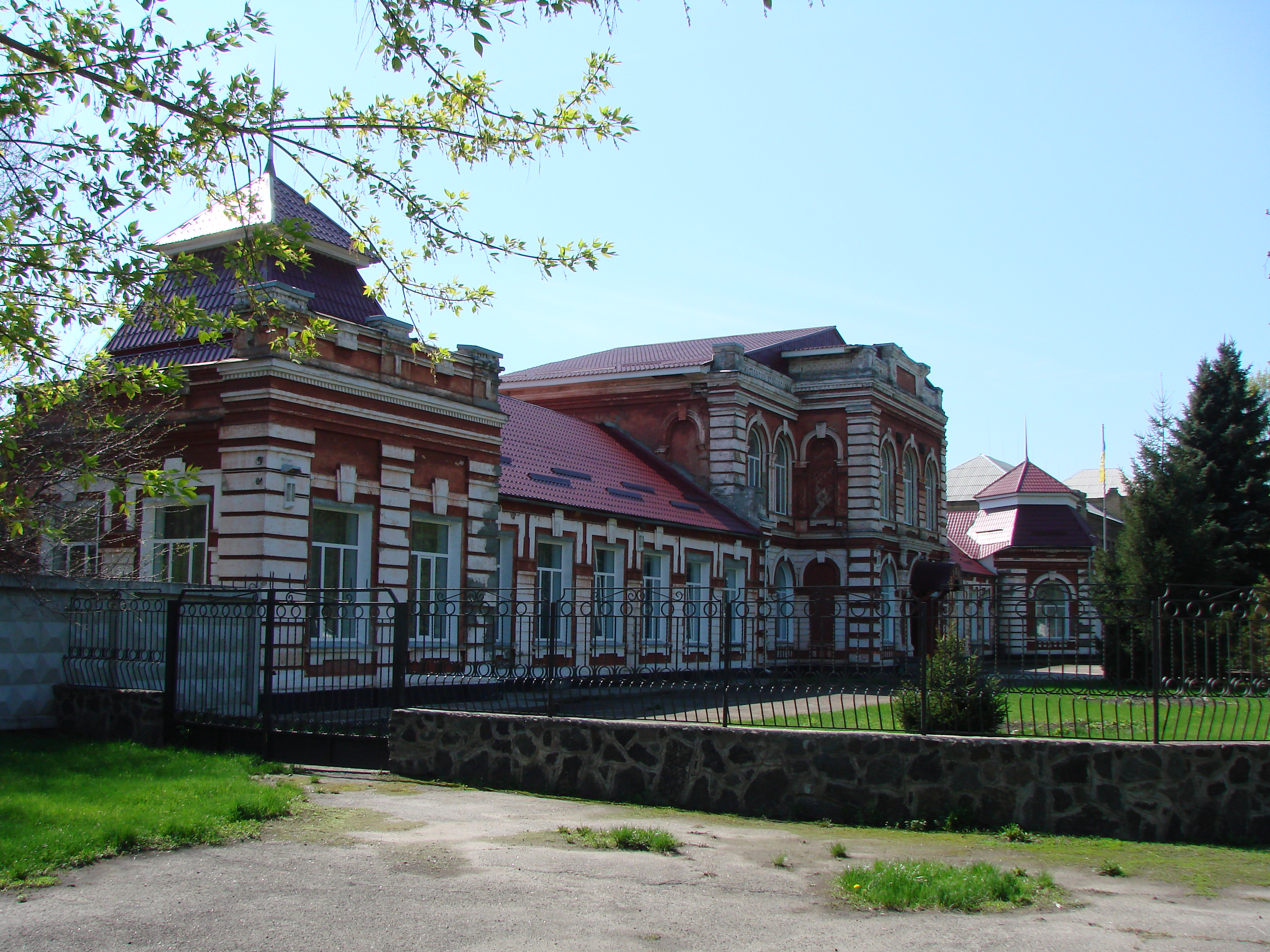
Female gymnasium building

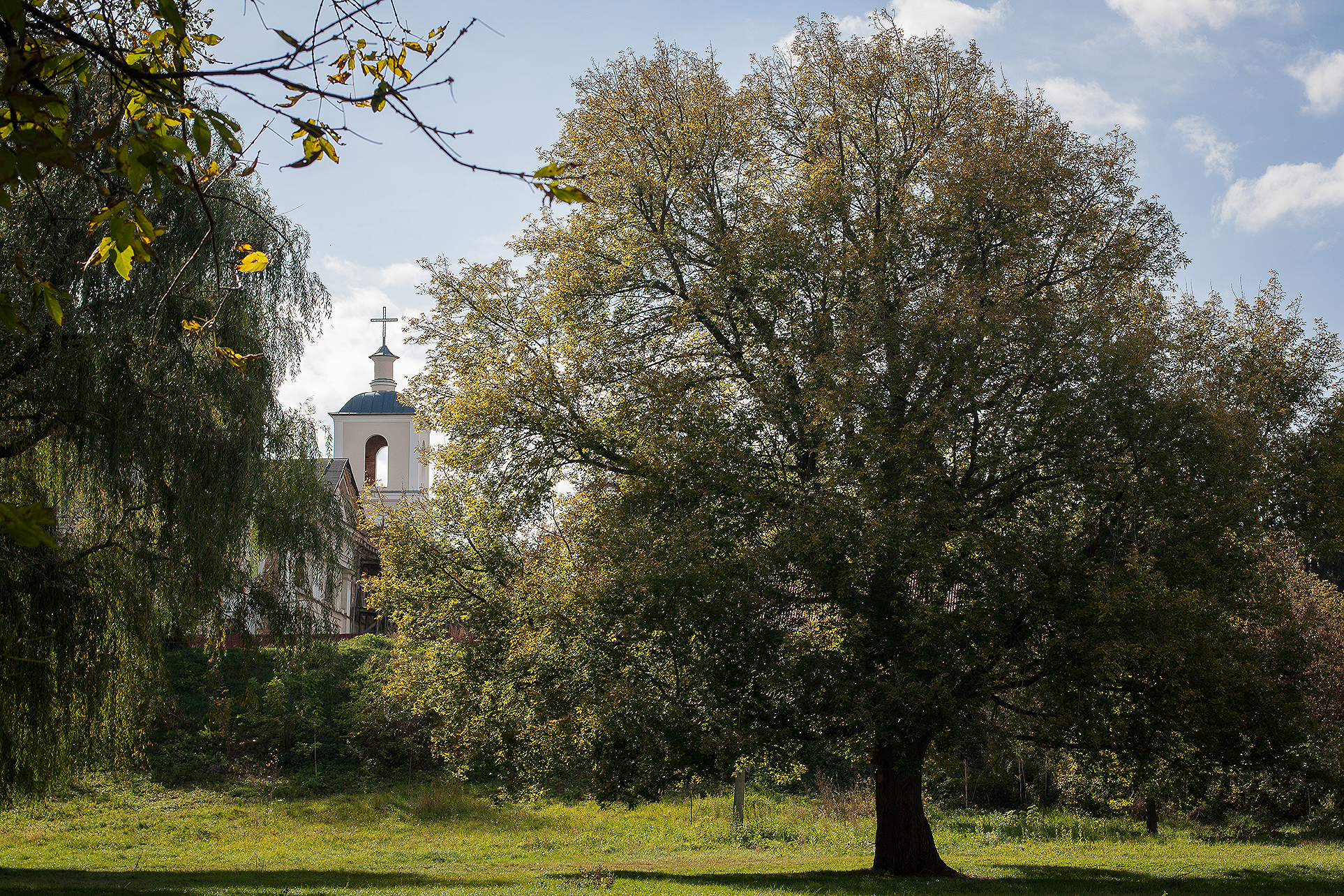
Assumption Church

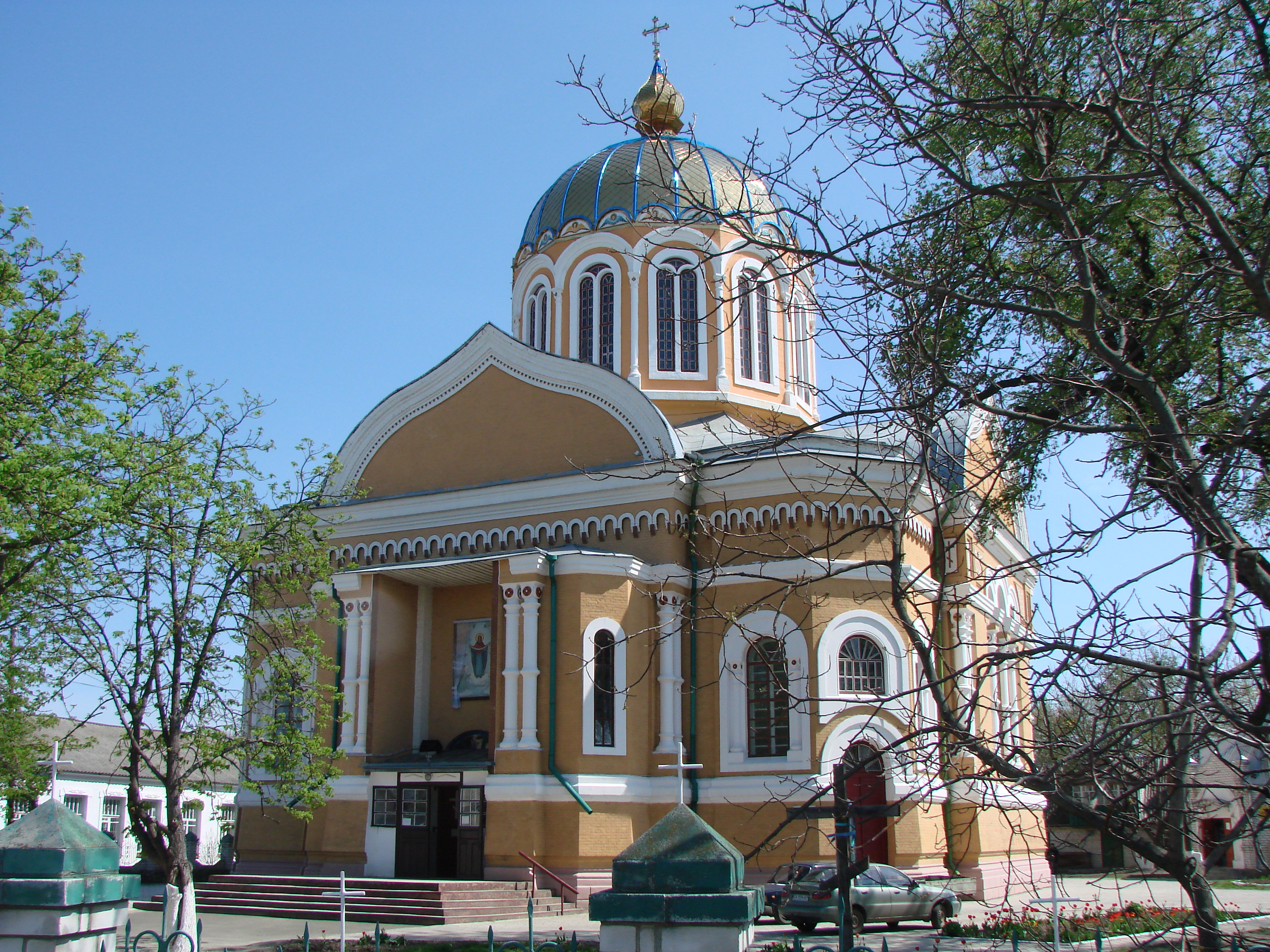
Church of the Holy Virgin

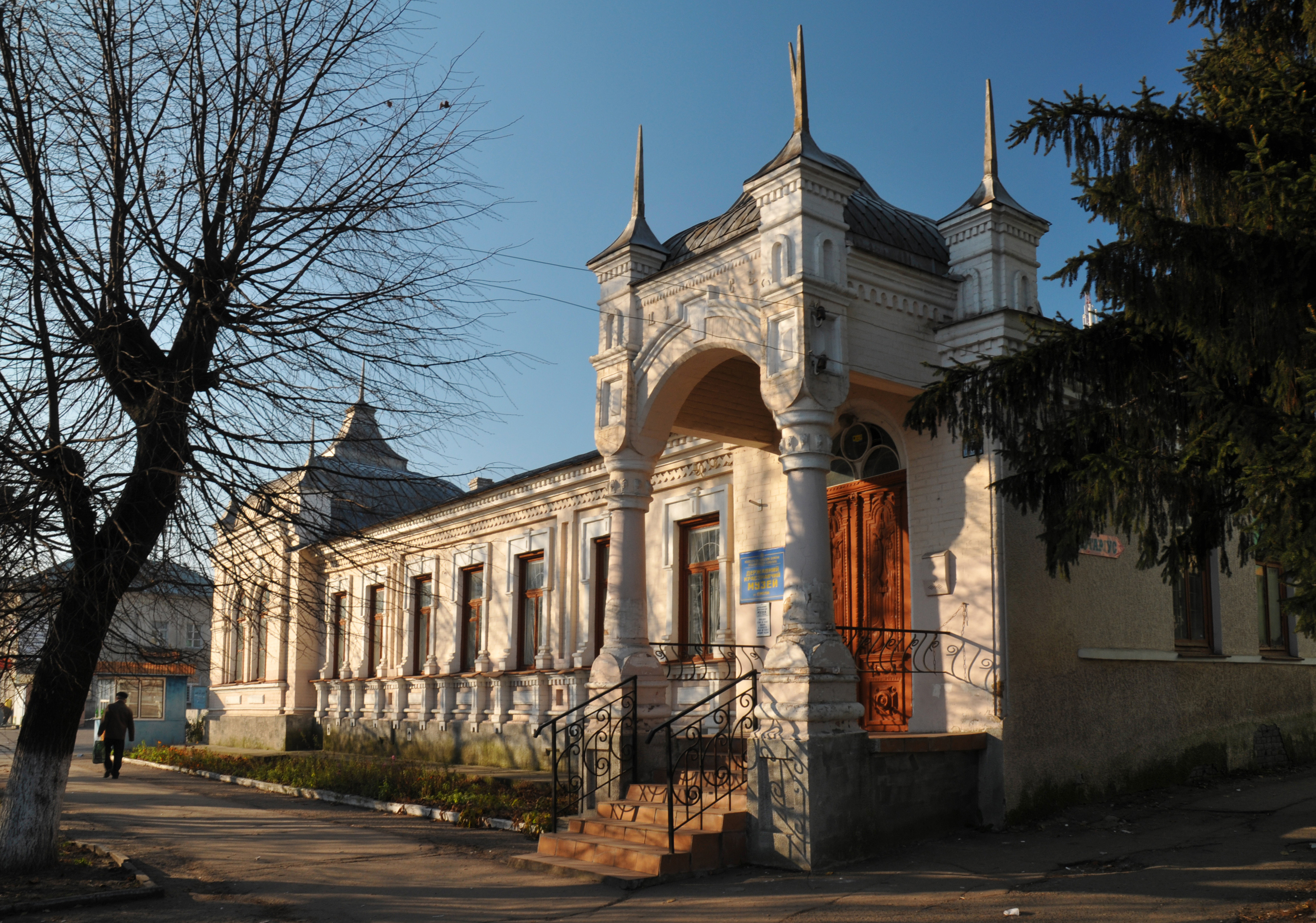
Museum of Local History

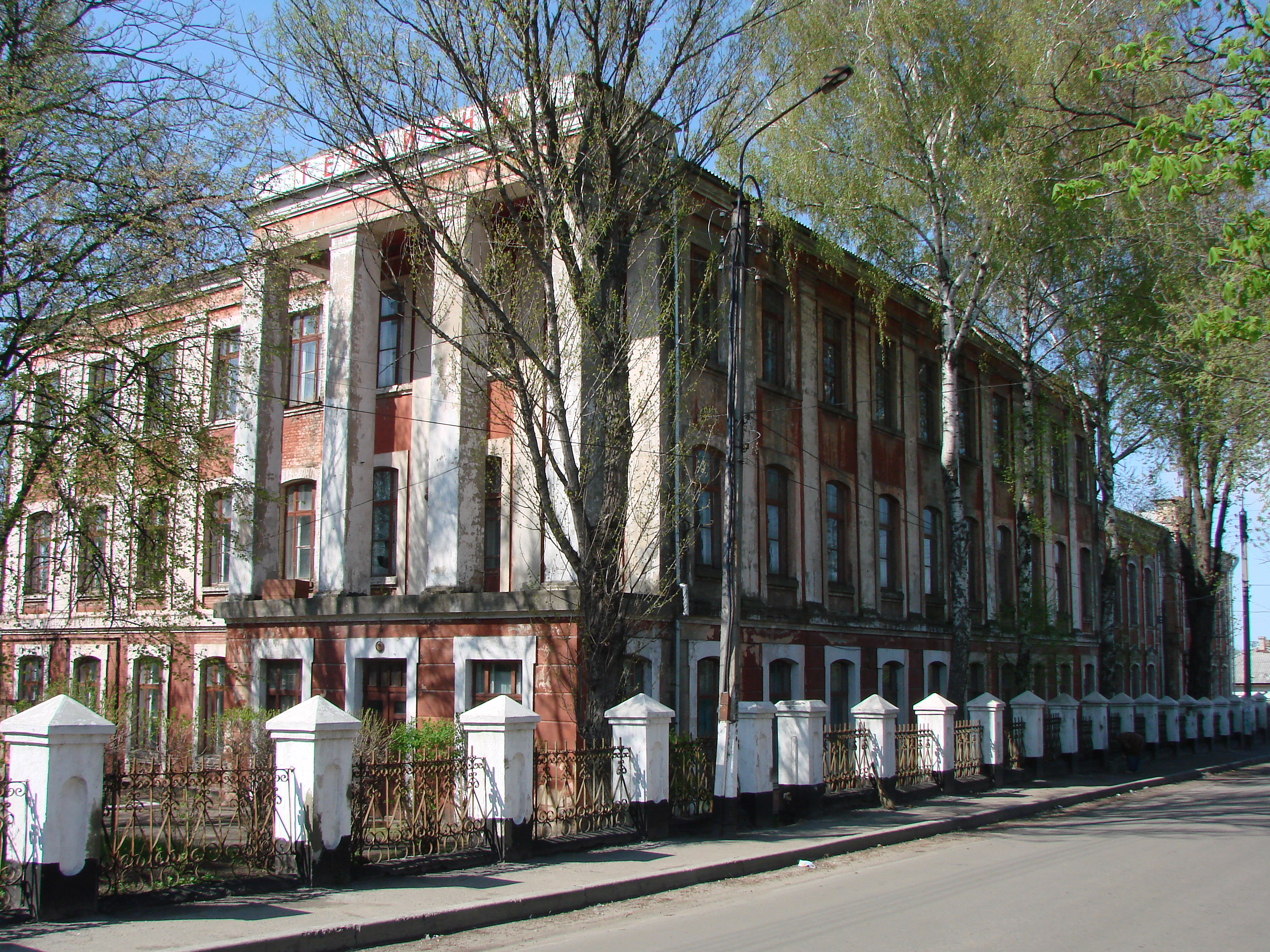
Technical Institute for Sugar Industry

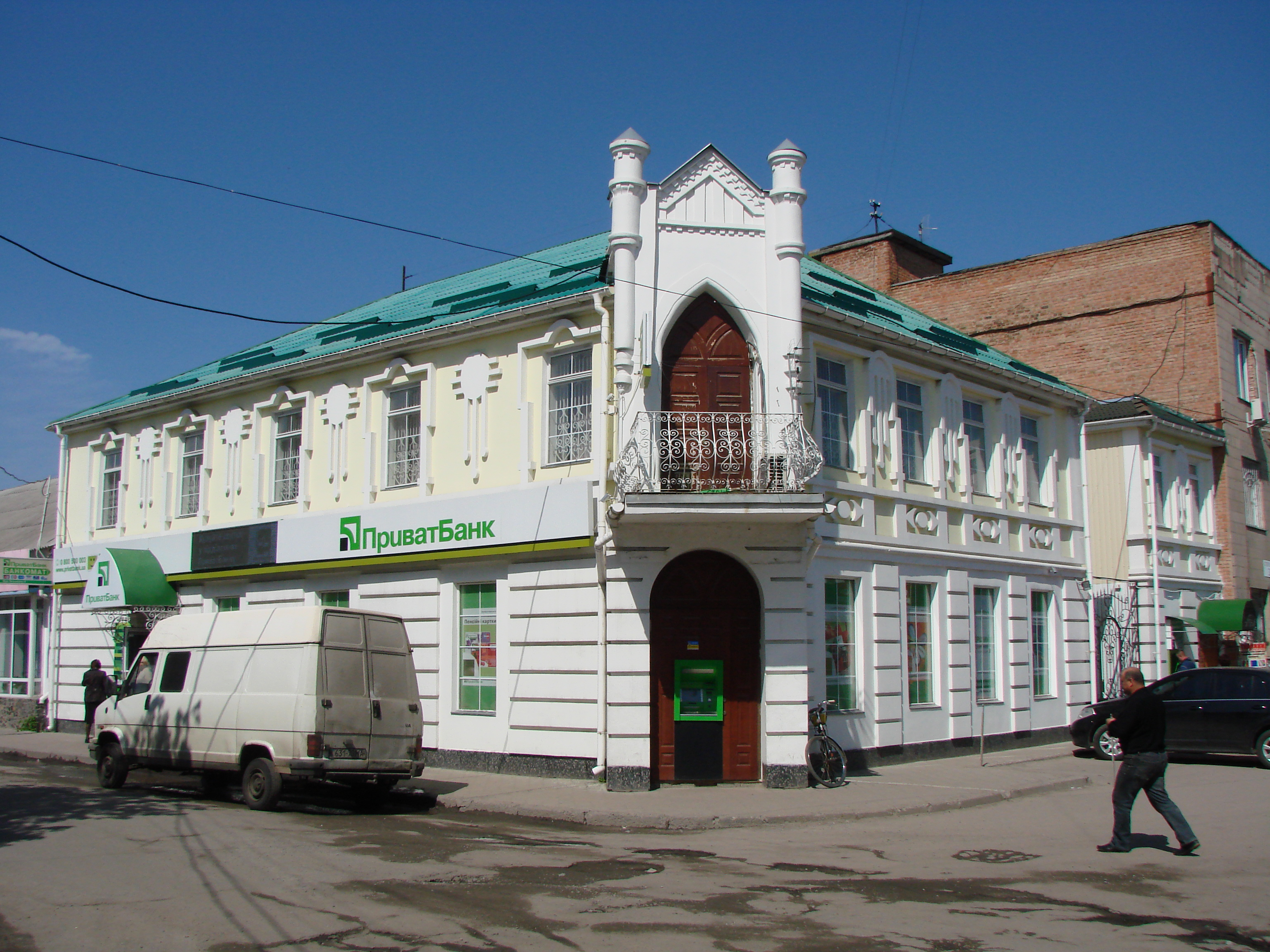
Bank building

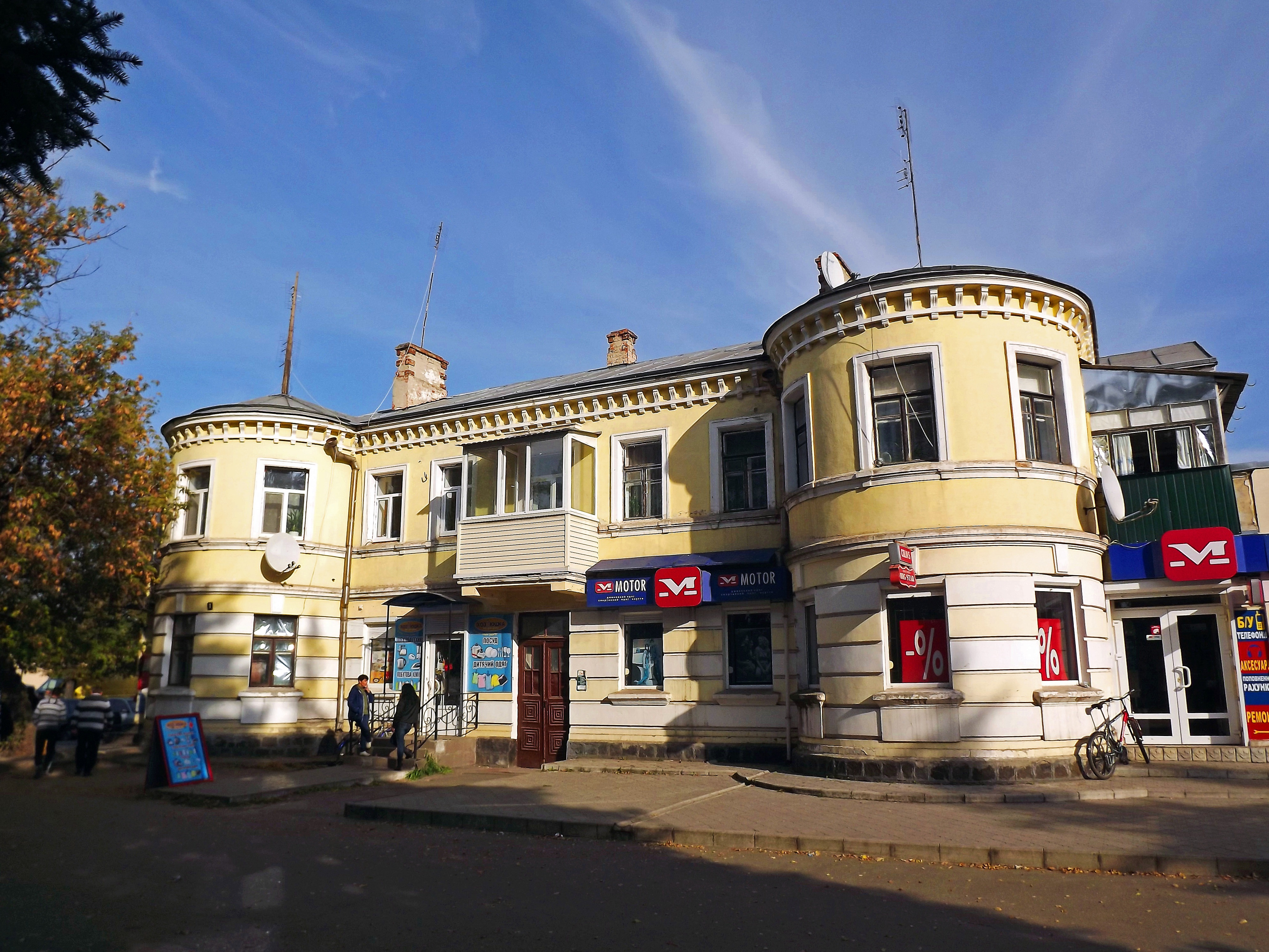
Shevchenko district

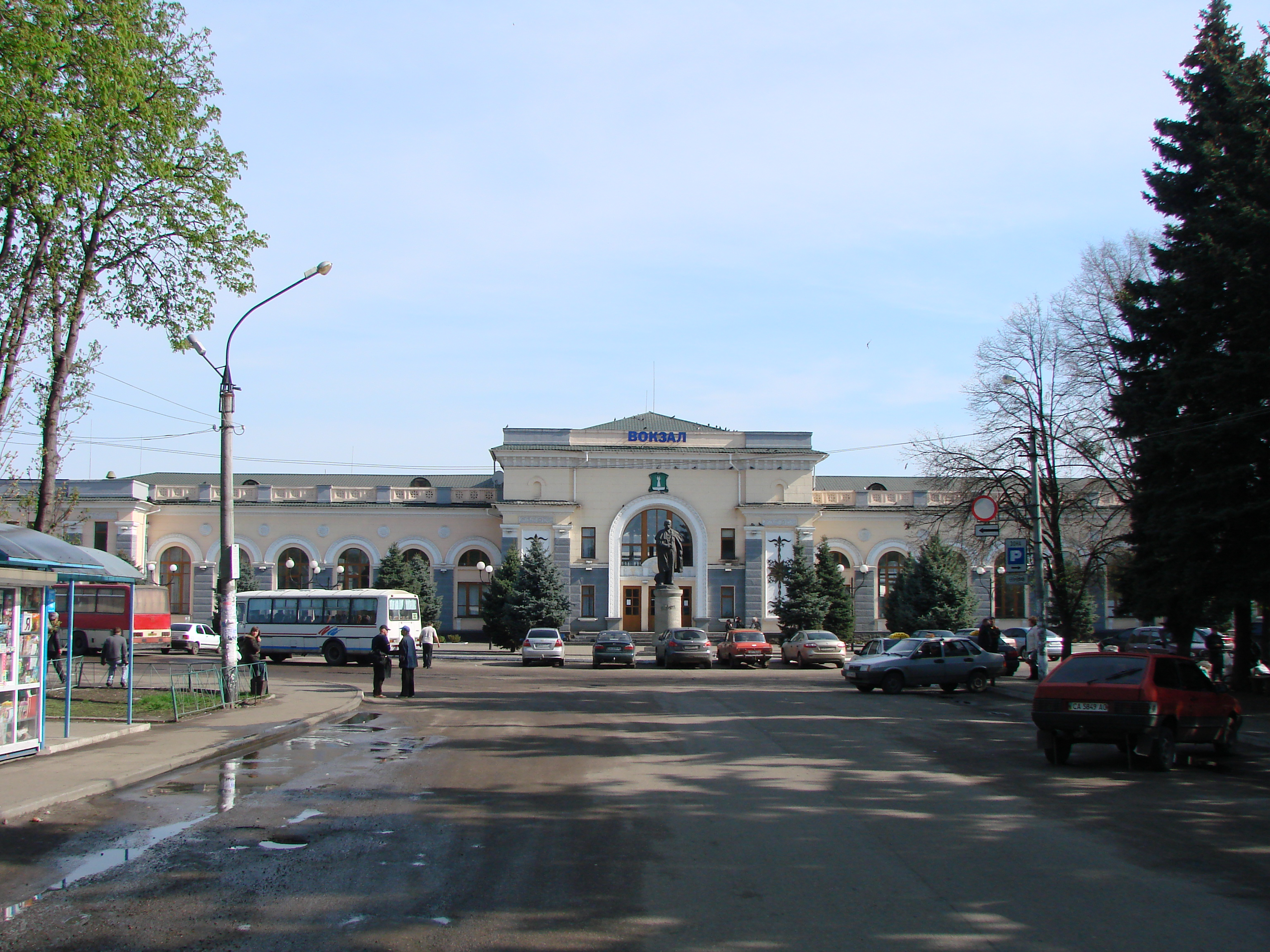
Railway station

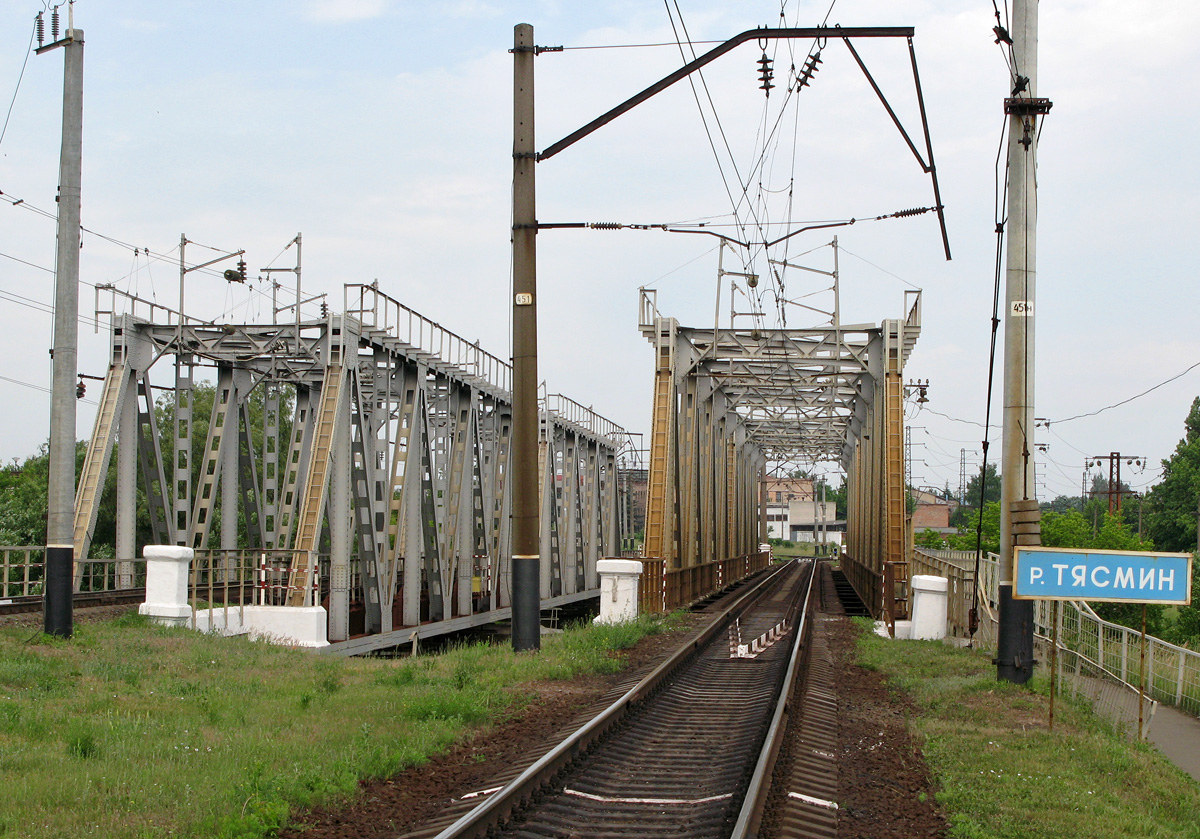
Railway bridge

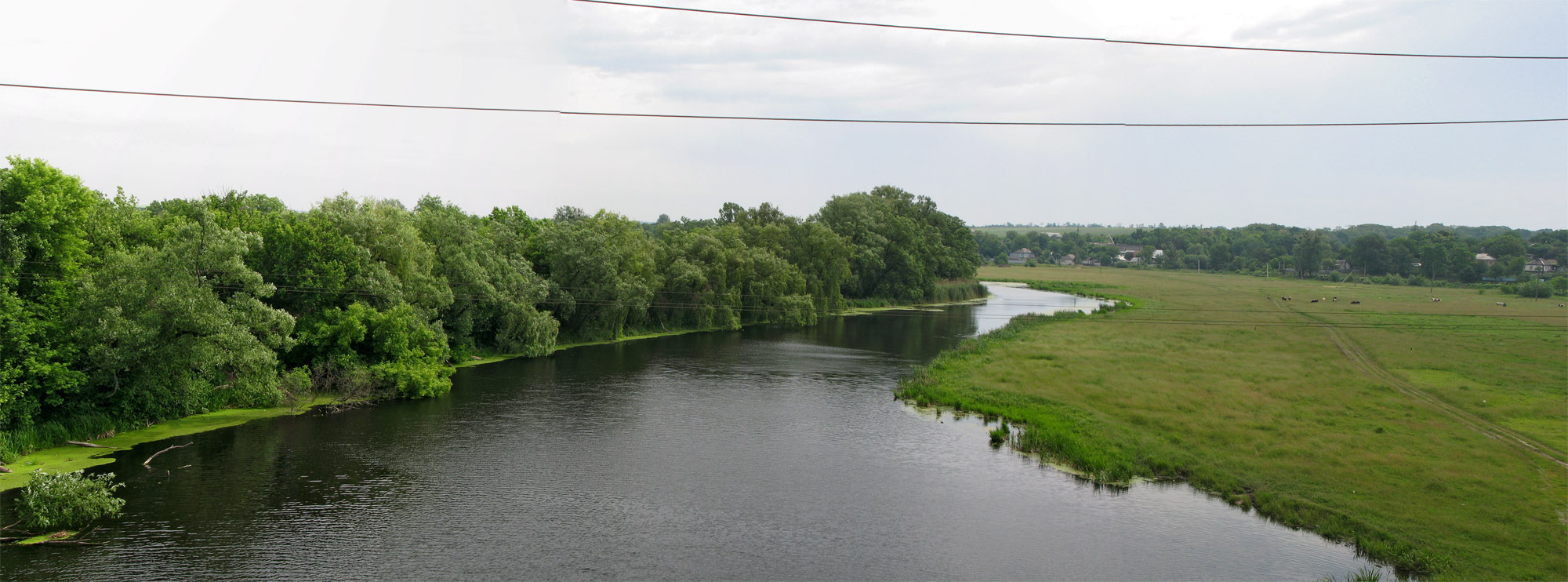
Tiasmyn River in Smila

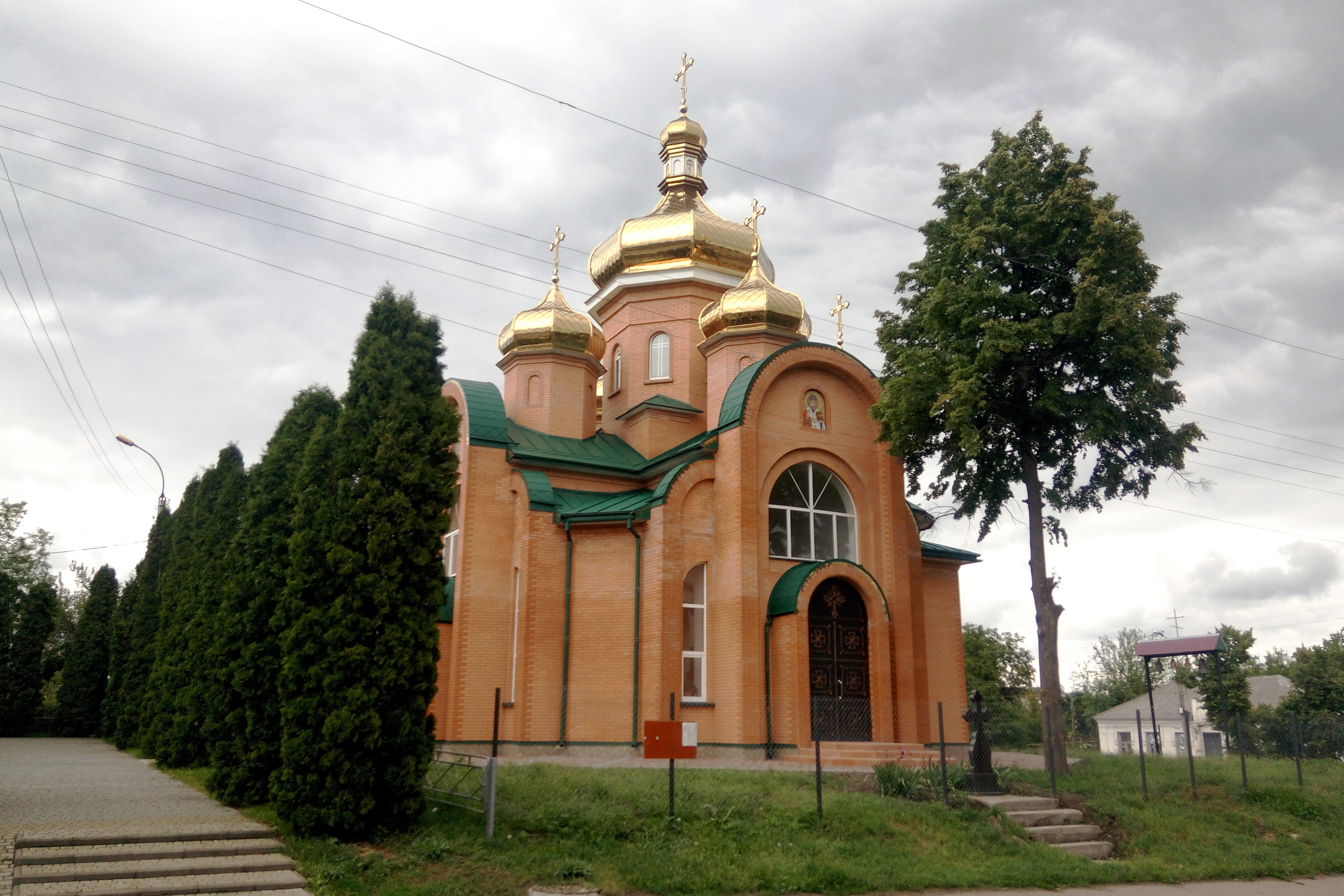
Nativity of Saint John the Baptist Church
