= Cherkasy urban hromada =

Hromada of Cherkasy Oblast, Ukraine

Cherkasy urban hromada Черкаська міська громада
- Hromada
- Seal
- Interactive map of Cherkasy urban hromada
- Country: Ukraine
- Oblast: Cherkasy
- Raion: Cherkasy

Area
  - Total: 76.8 km^{2} (29.7 sq mi)

Population (2023)
  - Total: 286,037
  - Density: 3,720/km^{2} (9,650/sq mi)
- Settlements: 2
- Cities: 1
- Villages: 1
- Website: chmr.gov.ua/ua/

Cherkasy urban territorial hromada (Ukrainian: Черка́ська міська територіальна громада, romanized: Cherkaska miska terytorialna hromada) is one of the hromadas of Ukraine, located in Cherkasy Raion in the country's Cherkasy Oblast. Its administrative centre is the city of Cherkasy.

Cherkasy urban hromada has an area of 76.8 km^{2} (29.7 mi^{2}), as well as a population of 286,037 (as of 2023).

== Composition ==
In addition to one city (Cherkasy), the hromada contains a single village: Orshanets.
