= Malavsky family =

Jewish-American family of cantorial and folk singers

The Malavsky family was a Jewish-American family of cantorial and Jewish folk singers. The father of the family, Samuel Malavsky (1894–1985), a renowned cantor and composer, was often the soloist, accompanied by his four daughters and two sons.

== Samuel Malavsky ==
Cantor Samuel (Shmuel) Malavsky was born in the Ukrainian city of Smila, near Kiev in 1894. In 1914, at the age of 20, he emigrated to America. His talent as a cantor was recognized by the world-renowned hazzan (cantor) Yossele Rosenblatt (who was also from Ukraine), who adopted Malavsky as his protégé. Malavsky was a cantor in numerous orthodox communities, including Bridgeton, Brooklyn, Philadelphia, New Haven and Detroit. He recorded many solo cantorial recordings, accompanied by an organ, as well as duets with his mentor Yossele Rosenblatt. Some of his compositions have become classics of the cantorial genre.

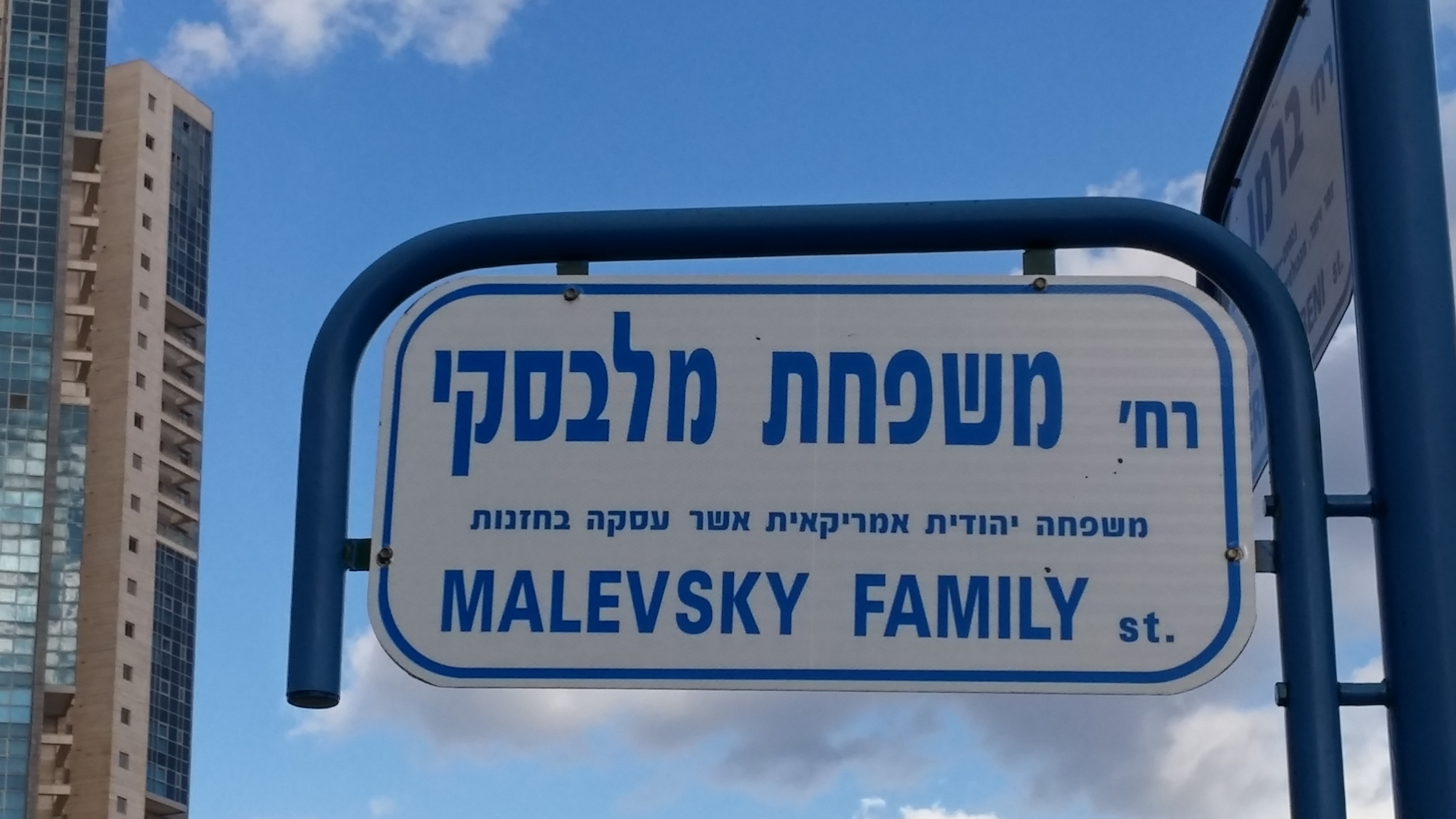
Malavsky Family street sign in Netanya, Israel

== See also ==
- Religious Jewish music
- chazzan
- chazante
