= Kamianka, Cherkasy Oblast =

City in Cherkasy Oblast, Ukraine

Kamianka Кам'янка
- City
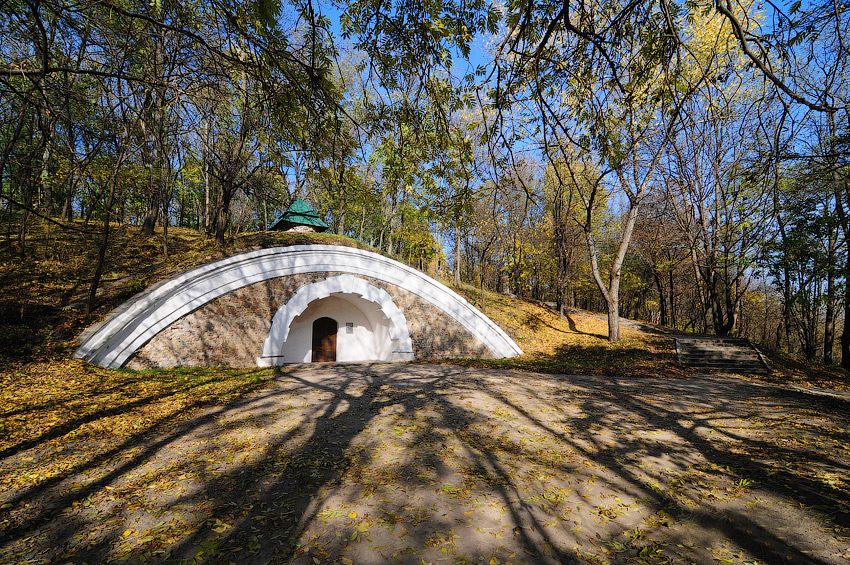
- Pushkіnskyi Grotto

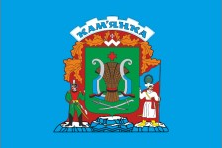
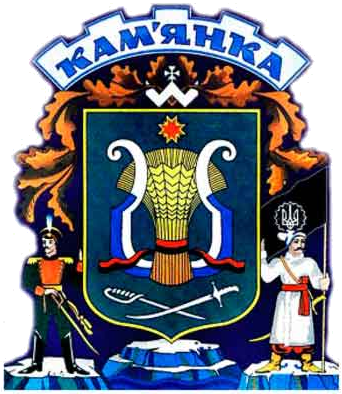
- Flag Coat of arms

- Location of Kamianka Kamianka (Ukraine)
- Coordinates: 49°02′N 32°06′E
- Country: Ukraine
- Oblast: Cherkasy Oblast
- Raion: Cherkasy Raion
- Hromada: Kamianka urban hromada
- Elevation: 127 m (417 ft)

Population (2022)
  - Total: 10,945
- Postal code: 20800-20809
- Area code: +380 4732
- Website: kamrada.ck.ua

Kamianka (Ukrainian: Кам'янка; IPA: [ˈkɑmjɐnkɐ]) is a small city in the Cherkasy Raion of Cherkasy Oblast of Ukraine. It hosts the administration of Kamianka urban hromada, one of the hromadas of Ukraine. It had a population of 10,945 (2022 estimate).

It is a countryside town approximately 300 kilometres (190 mi) southeast from Kyiv, located on the bank of the Tiasmyn River, in the Dnieper Upland.

== Government ==
Until 18 July 2020, Kamianka served as an administrative center of Kamianka Raion. The raion was abolished in July 2020 as part of the administrative reform of Ukraine, which reduced the number of raions of Cherkasy Oblast to four. The area of the Kamianka Raion was merged into the Cherkasy Raion.

== History ==
Kamianka is known as an artist's colony, in which Prince Grigory Potemkin, the Russian national poet Alexander Pushkin, the composer Pyotr Ilyich Tchaikovsky, and other freethinkers and war heroes during the Napoleonic Wars era worked. Kamianka was also one of the chief centres of the Southern Society of the Decembrists.

== Population ==
According to the 2001 Ukrainian census, the city's population was 15,109. Ukrainians accounted for 94.8% of the population and Russians for 4.3%. Ukrainian was the native language for 95.8% of the population, and Russian for 4%.

== Economy ==
Kamianka is a centre of food industry.

== Culture ==
Kamianka has its own historical-cultural open-air museum with monument-protected constructions, collections and parks.

== Gallery ==
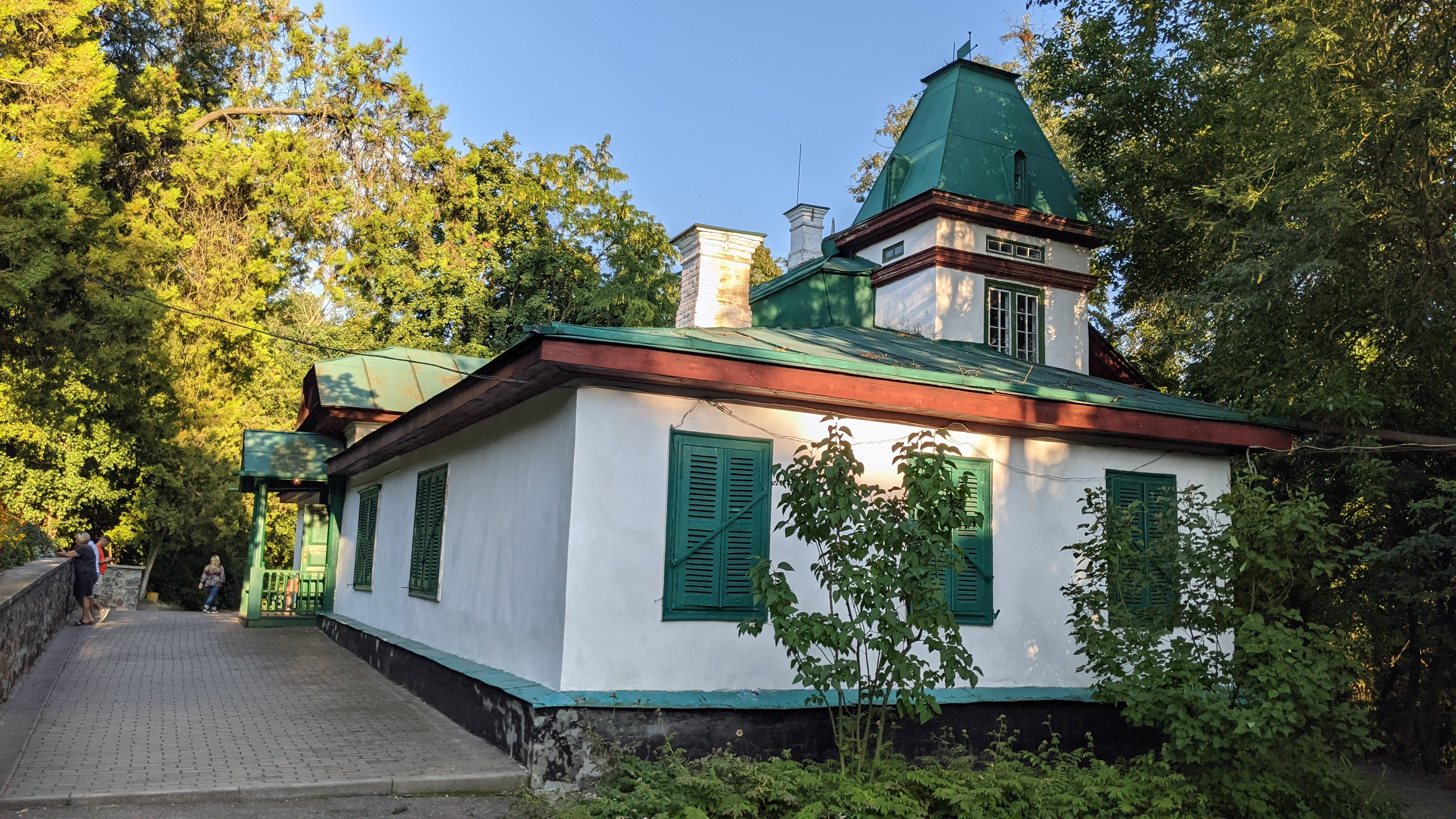
"Green house" (Davydov manor)

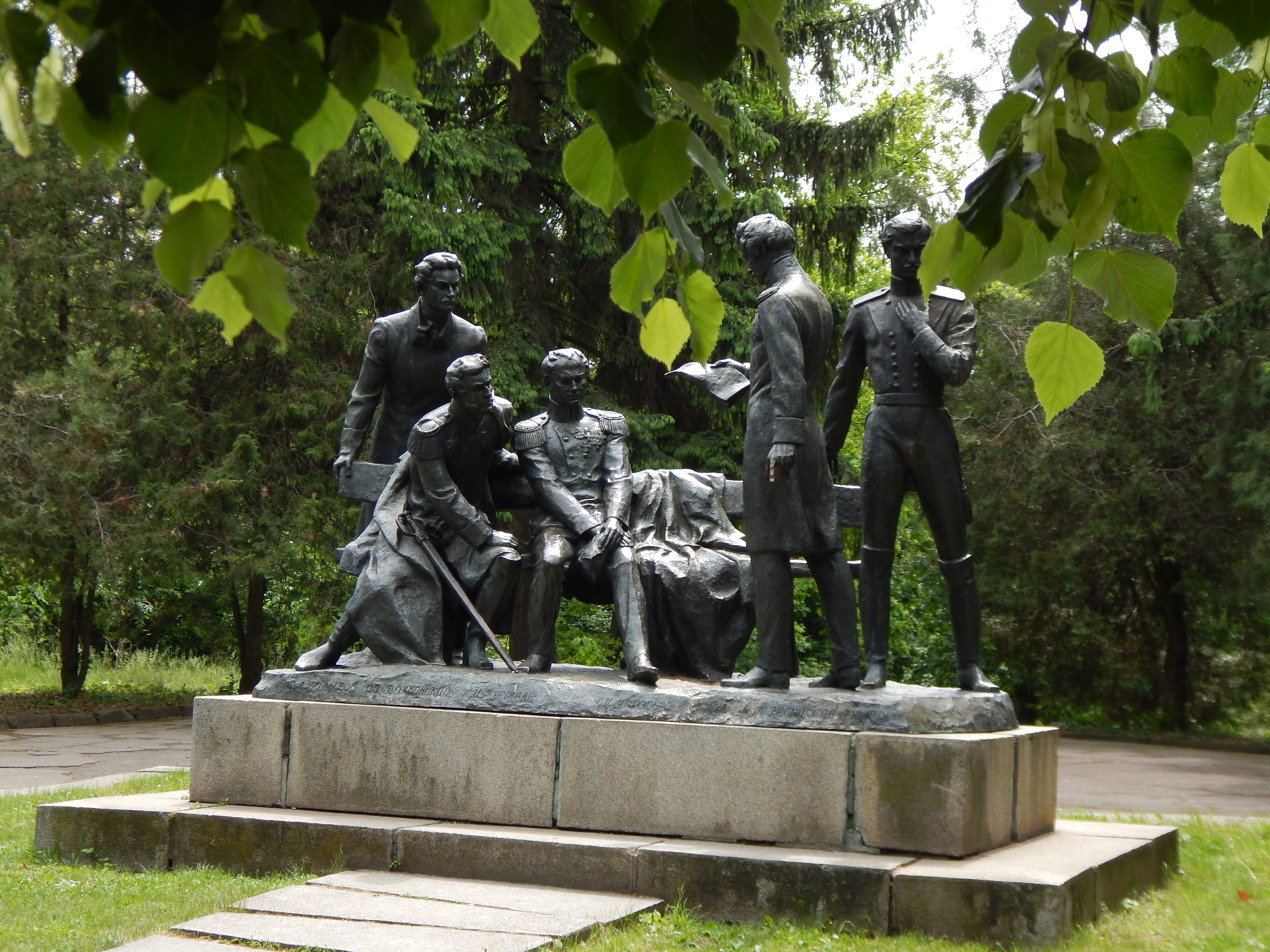
Decembrists monument

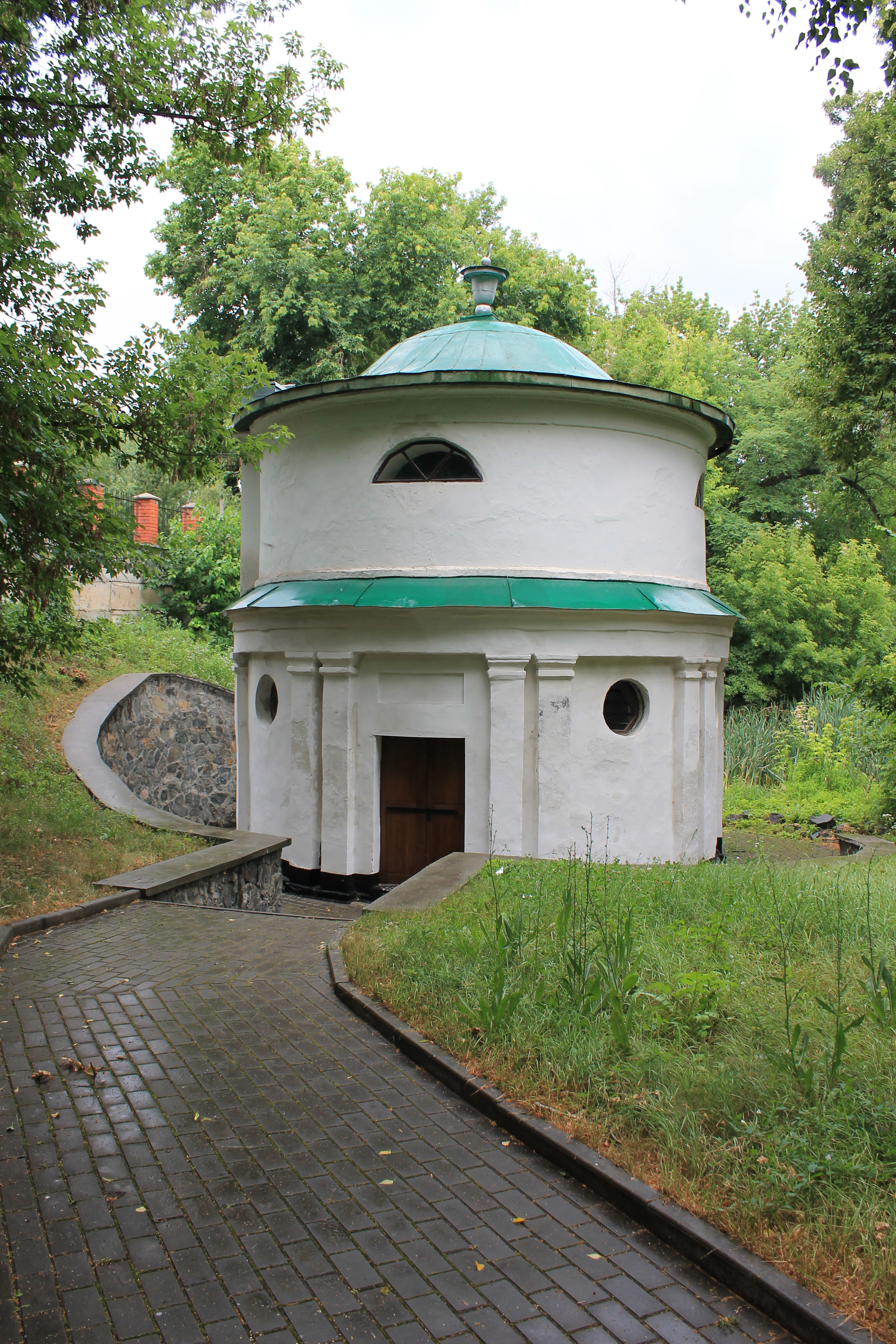
Kamianka water mill (1825)

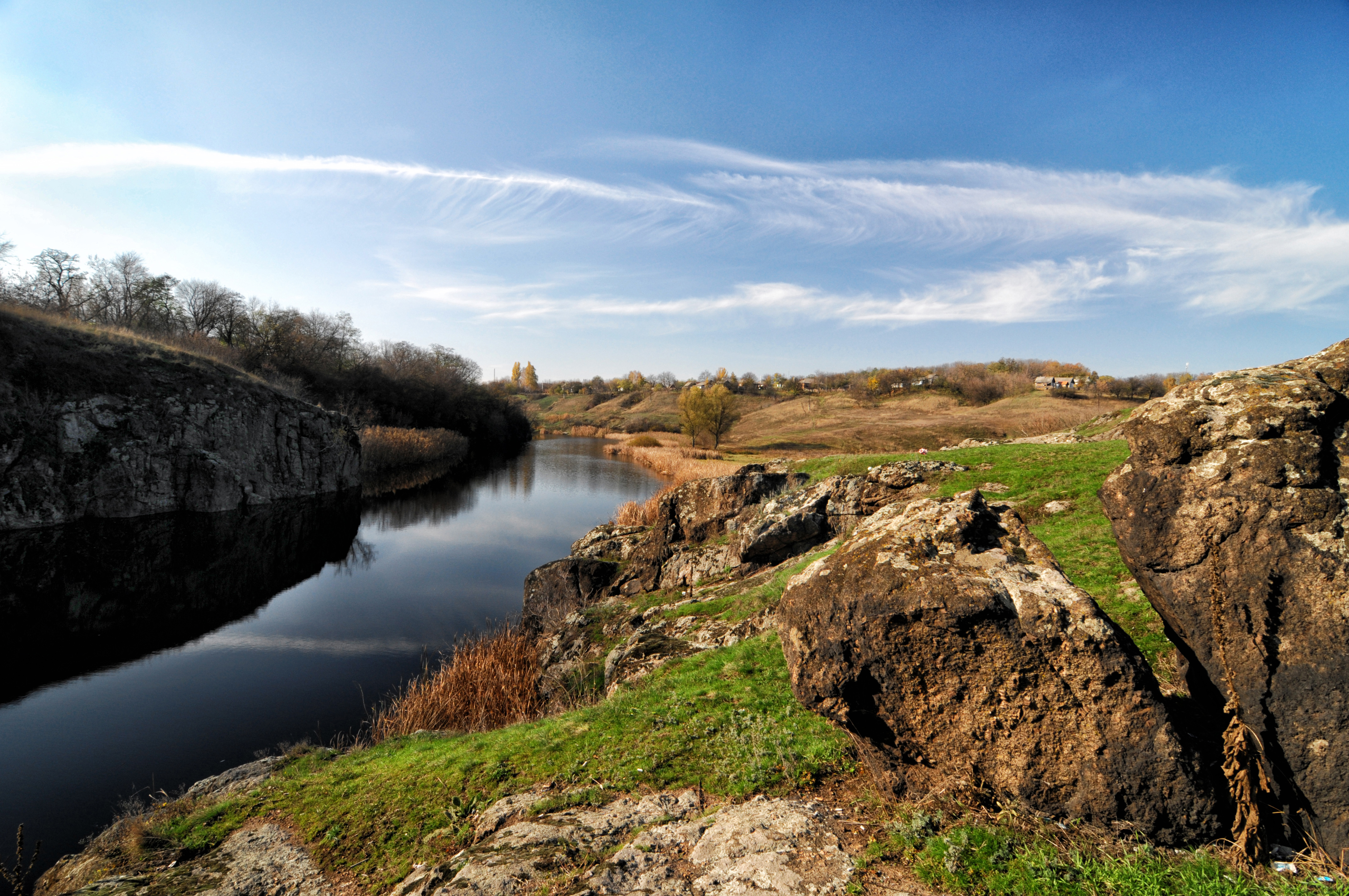
Tiasmyn canyon near Kamianka

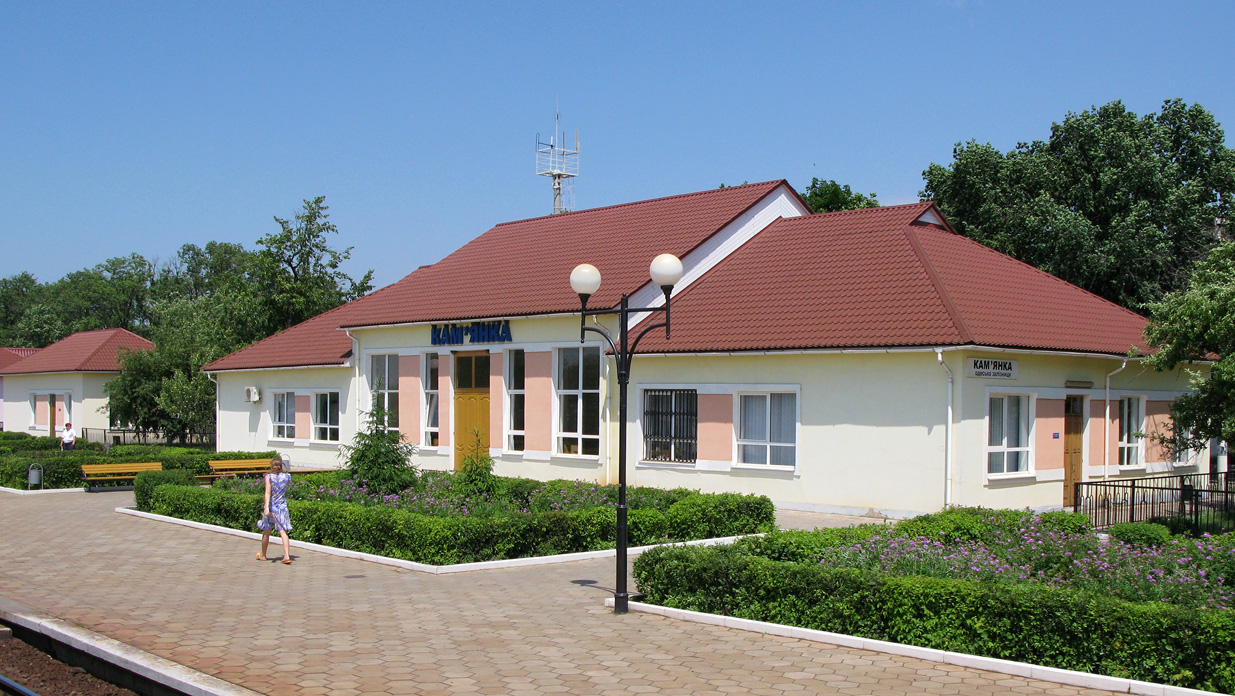
Railway station

== See also ==
- List of cities in Ukraine
