= Cherkasy Forest =

Forest in Ukraine

Coordinates: 49.393894°N 31.760043°E

Cherkasy Forest (Ukrainian: Черкаський бір, romanized: Čerkas'kyj bir) is a natural pine forest located on north and north-west ends of the city Cherkasy in central Ukraine. At 28,500 hectares (70,400 acres), it is famous as the biggest natural pine forest on the south edge of the scots pine area. Along with Irdyn Swamp and Moshnogirya Log, it creates 41,700 hectares (103,000 acres) of unique natural area.

Flora of this forest counts more than 800 species, 18 of which are listed in The Red List of Ukraine (list of species that are in danger of vanishing). The forest was nominated as one of the 7 wonders of Cherkasy Oblast.

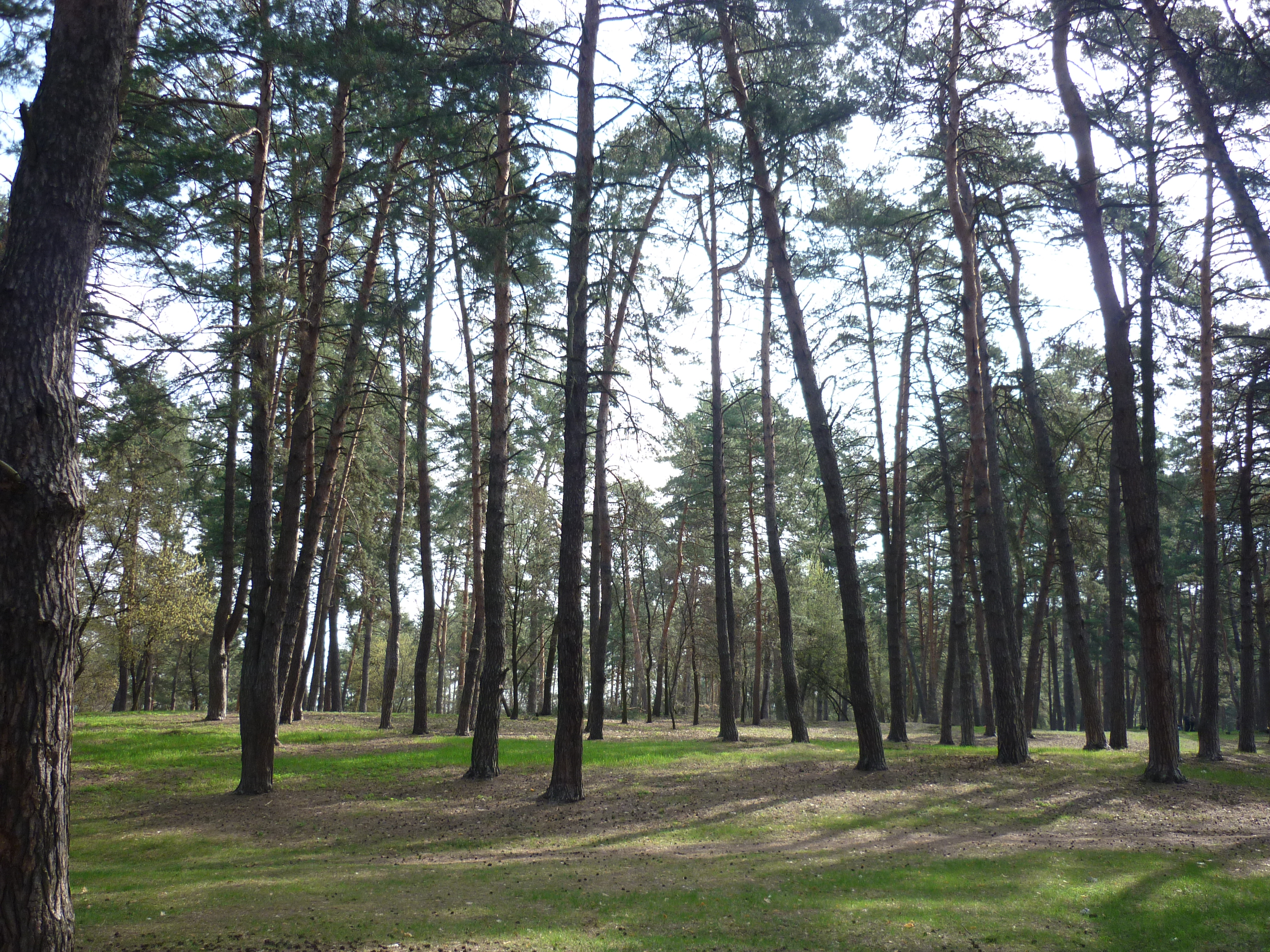
Photo of Cherkaskiy Bir

Summer in Cherkasy Forest

== Usage ==
The main importance of Cherkasy forest lies in its recreational resources. It serves as a place of recreation for Cherkasy residents and visitors. In Soviet times, a large sanatorium complex for the highest ranks of the Soviet government was located on the territory of the forest. Now this building is dilapidated. Today, there are several sanatoriums and recreation centers in the forest. The most famous part of Cherkasy Bor is Sosnivka, a neighborhood of Cherkasy located on the sandy terrace of the Dnipro River.

There are many recreation centers and sanatoriums within Cherkasy Bor. The buildings of the Svitanok sanatorium are located on the coastal areas of the Svydovske forestry enterprise on an area of 50 hectares, the large Ukraine sanatorium is located in the Sosnivka neighborhood, and the Moshnihirske sanatorium is located near the village of Moshny. In Cherkasy forest, which is directly adjacent to the Dnipro river bank, there is the Sokyrne recreation center.

The Cherkasy forest is also a source of medicinal raw materials, serves as a base for the development of beekeeping, and is of great landscape, architectural, and aesthetic importance. The forest plantations of the forest are of great environmental importance. They cover the sandy terraces of the right bank of the Dnipro River, preventing the movement and blowing of sands, soil washout and erosion. The forests of the coastal strip regulate the surface runoff of atmospheric water and protect the banks of the Kremenchuk reservoir on the Dnipro from erosion. The forest improves the microclimate of the surrounding areas, helps to preserve small rivers and increase crop yields.

== Protection ==
The Cherkasy Forest includes 23 objects of the nature reserve fund with a total area of 2,169 hectares (including the Rusko-Polyansky Botanical Reserve — of national importance) — 6 reserves (Dakhnivka, Moshnohirsky, Rusko-Polyansky wetland), 14 natural monuments (Moshenska oak forest, a highly productive pine plantation in Dakhnivka, a forest plantation of centuries-old oaks in Svydivka, a forest plantation of alder and oak in Svydivka, an Amur velvet plantation near the village of Moshny, a Witch's Broom pine in Dubiivka, a six-trunk oak tree on the territory of a game farm, an underground spring in Moshny, a landscape plantation of centuries-old pine "Sosnivka" in Cherkasy) and 3 parks-monuments of landscape art.
