= Mykhailivka rural hromada, Zaporizhzhia Oblast =

Mykhailivka rural hromada Михайлівська селищна громада
- Hromada
- Interactive map of Mykhailivka rural hromada
- Country: Ukraine
- Oblast: Zaporizhzhia Oblast
- Raion: Zaporizhzhia Raion
- Admin. center: Mykhailivka

Area
  - Total: 164.1 km^{2} (63.4 sq mi)

Population (2020)
  - Total: 6,408
  - Density: 39.05/km^{2} (101.1/sq mi)
- Settlements: 15
- Villages: 15

Mykhailivka rural hromada (Ukrainian: Михайлівська селищна громада) is a hromada of Ukraine, located in Zaporizhzhia Raion, Zaporizhzhia Oblast. Its administrative center is the village of Mykhailivka.

It has an area of 164.1 square kilometres (63.4 mi^{2}) and a population of 6,408, as of 2020.

The hromada contains 15 settlements, which are all villages:

- Andriivka
- Bohatyrivka
- Vasylivske
- Vilnoandriivka
- Vilnohrushivske
- Vilnokurianivske
- Vilnoulanivske
- Heorhiivske
- Zaporizhzhia
- Krynychne
- Liutserna
- Mykhailivka
- Nahirne
- Serhiivka
- Sokolivka

== See also ==
- List of hromadas of Ukraine
