= Mykhailivka, Zaporizhzhia Raion, Zaporizhzhia Oblast =

Village in Zaporizhzhia Oblast, Ukraine

Mykhailivka Михайлівка
- Village
- Location in Ukraine Mykhailivka (Ukraine)
- Coordinates: 47°57′13″N 35°15′31″E
- Country: Ukraine
- Oblast: Zaporizhzhia Oblast
- Raion: Zaporizhzhia Raion
- Hromada: Mykhailivka rural hromada

Area
  - Total: 2.737 km^{2} (1.057 sq mi)
- Elevation: 52 m (171 ft)

Population (2001)
  - Total: 2,177
- Time zone: UTC+2 (EET)
  - Summer (DST): UTC+3 (EEST)
- Postal code: 70030
- Area code: +380 6143

Mykhailivka (Ukrainian: Михайлівка) is a village located in Zaporizhzhia Raion, Zaporizhzhia Oblast, Ukraine.

Until 18 July 2020, Mykhailivka was located in Vilniansk Raion. The raion was abolished in July 2020 as part of the administrative reform of Ukraine, which reduced the number of raions of Zaporizhzhia Oblast to five. The area of Vilniansk Raion was merged into Zaporizhzhia Raion.
