= Balakleia rural hromada =

Balakleia rural hromada Балаклейська сільська громада
- Hromada
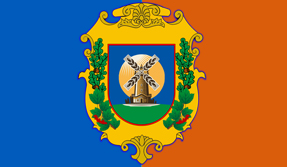
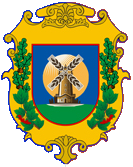
- Flag Seal
- Interactive map of Balakleia rural hromada
- Country: Ukraine
- Oblast: Cherkasy
- Raion: Cherkasy

Area
  - Total: 2,064 km^{2} (797 sq mi)

Population
  - Total: 9,519
  - Density: 4.612/km^{2} (11.94/sq mi)
- Website: balakleivska-gromada.gov.ua

Balakleia rural hromada is one of the hromadas located in Cherkasy Raion of Cherkasy Oblast of Ukraine. Its administrative seat is the village of Balakleia.

== Localities ==
Villages:

- Balakleia (administrative centre)
- Budky
- Kostiantynivka
- Male Starosillia
- Ploske, Cherkasy Raion
- Teklyne
