= Biloziria =

Biloziria Білозір'я
- Village
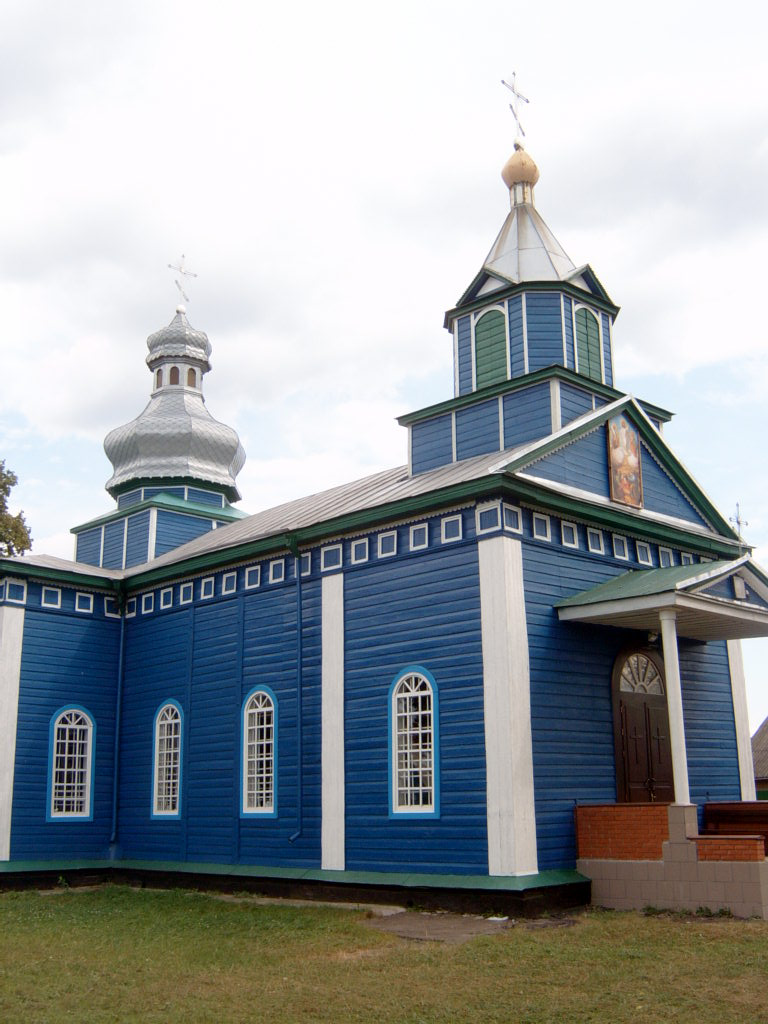
- Transfiguration Church of 1754

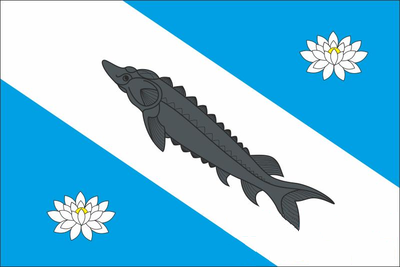
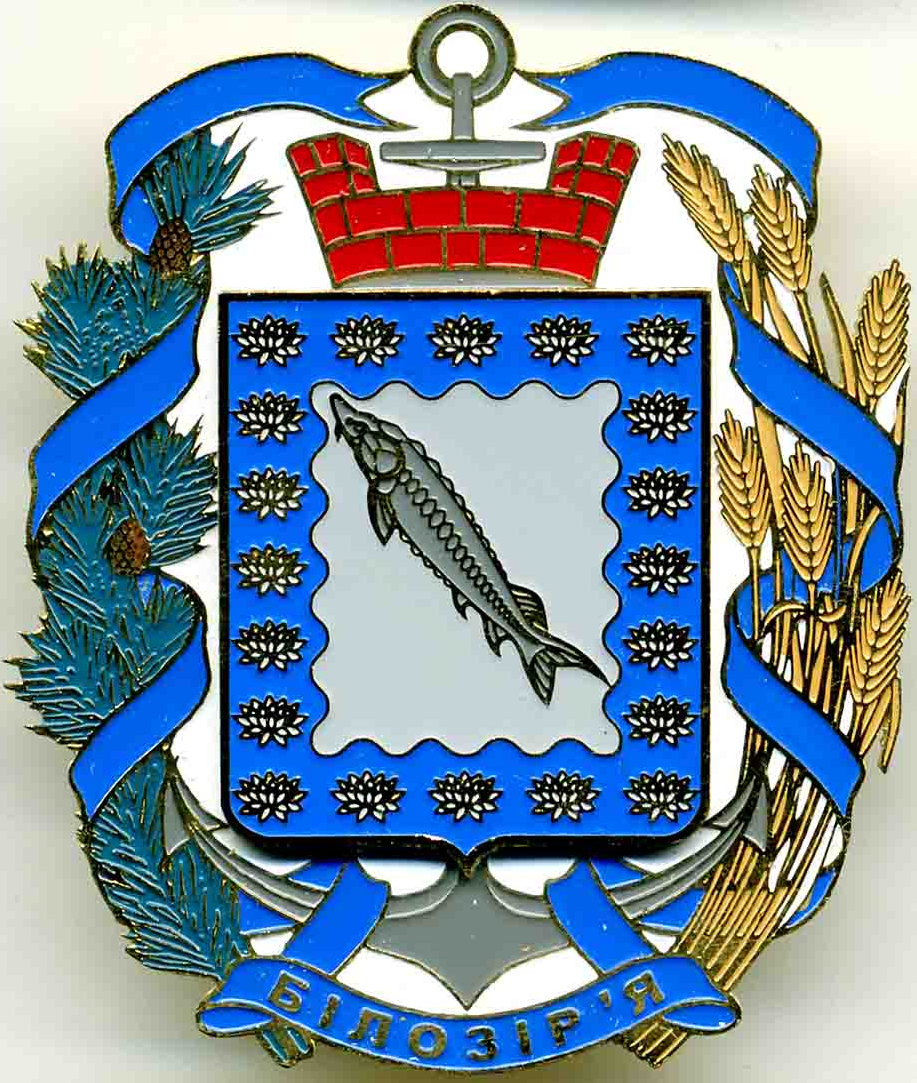
- Flag Coat of arms

- Location within Ukraine Location within Cherkasy Oblast
- Coordinates: 49°18′19″N 31°53′32″E
- Country: Ukraine
- Oblast: Cherkasy
- Raion: Cherkasy

Population
  - Total: 8,506
- Website: Ukrainian Parliament website

Biloziria (Ukrainian: Білозір'я) is a big village (selo) in central Ukraine. It is located in Cherkasy Raion (district) of Cherkasy Oblast (province) 20 km (12 mi) southwest from the city of Cherkasy. It hosts the administration of Biloziria rural hromada, one of the hromadas of Ukraine.

== History ==
The village is mentioned as a town in the "Tales about populated localities of Kyiv Governorate" of 1864 by Lavrentiy Polkhylevych and the fact that existed before 1710.

== Population ==
=== Language ===
Distribution of the population by native language according to the 2001 census:

Language	Number	Percentage
Ukrainian	8 436	99.18%
Other^{[a]}	70	0.82%
Total	8 506	100.00%

^{a} Those who did not indicate their native language or indicated a language that was native to less than 1% of the local population.
