= Mykhailivka rural hromada, Cherkasy Oblast =

Mykhailivka rural hromada
- Hromada
- Interactive map of Mykhailivka rural hromada
- Country: Ukraine
- Oblast: Cherkasy Oblast
- Raion: Cherkasy Raion
- Admin. center: Mykhailivka

Mykhailivka rural hromada (Ukrainian: Миха́йлівська сільська об'єднана територіальна громада) is a hromada in Ukraine, located in Cherkasy Raion, Cherkasy Oblast. Its administrative center is the village Mykhailivka. It was created on 24 December 2017.

== Composition ==
The hromada contains 13 settlements: 3 rural settlements (Hrekove, Lisove, and Sokyrne), and 10 villages:

- Zhabotyn
- Kurylivka
- Lubentsi
- Mykhailivka
- Pliakivka
- Raihorod
- Rebedailivka
- Revivka
- Fliarkivka
- Yarove
