= Rotmistrivka =

Ukrainian village

Coordinates: 49°08′28″N 31°42′49″E

Rotmistrivka (Ukrainian: Ротмістрівка) is a village in the Cherkasy oblast of Ukraine. In the 2001 census, it was recorded as having 2,156 inhabitants. It is 14 kilometers (9 mi) southwest of Smila and 44 km southwest of the district capital, Cherkasy. The village had a large Jewish community until the Holocaust and was the home of the Rachmastrivka Hasidic dynasty. The Rotmistrivka crater is located nearby.
