= Cherkasy Raion =

Subdivision of Cherkasy Oblast, Ukraine

Cherkasy Raion Черкаський район
- Raion
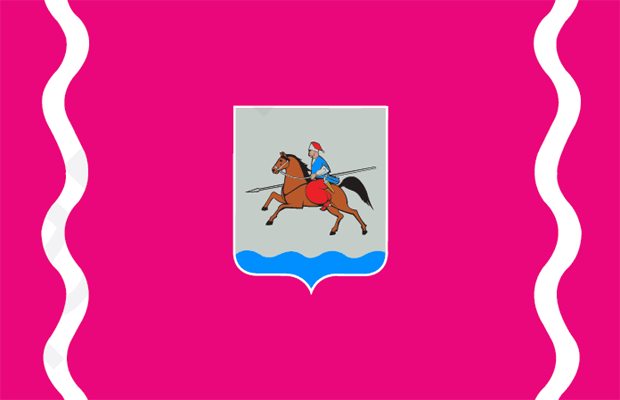
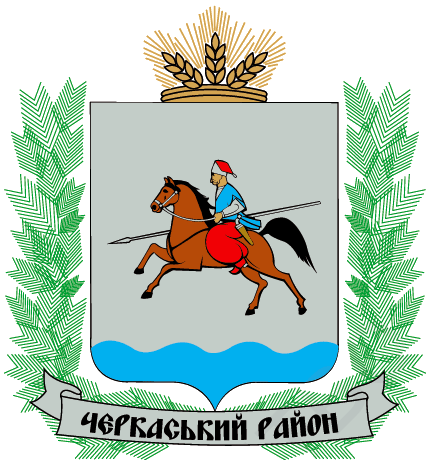
- Flag Coat of arms
- Interactive map of Cherkasy Raion
- Coordinates: 49°30′0″N 31°48′0″E
- Country: Ukraine
- Oblast: Cherkasy Oblast
- Established: 4 January 1965
- Admin. center: Cherkasy
- Subdivisions: 26 hromadas

Government
  - Chairman: Kostiantyn Omargalieva

Area
  - Total: 1,617 km^{2} (624 sq mi)

Population (2022)
  - Total: 583,648
  - Density: 360.9/km^{2} (934.8/sq mi)
- Time zone: UTC+02:00 (EET)
  - Summer (DST): UTC+03:00 (EEST)
- Postal index: 19601—19646
- Area code: 380-472
- Website: http://cherkassy-rda.gov.ua/

Cherkasy Raion (Ukrainian: Черкаський район, romanized: Cherkas'kyi raion) is a raion (district) of Cherkasy Oblast. It is located in the central part of Cherkasy oblast, and the center of the raion is the city of Cherkasy. The population is 583,648 (2022 estimate).

On 18 July 2020, as part of the administrative reform of Ukraine, the number of raions of Cherkasy Oblast was reduced to four, and the area of Cherkasy Raion was significantly expanded. Four abolished raions, Chyhyryn, Kamianka, Kaniv, and Smila Raions, parts of two more abolished raions, Korsun-Shevchenkivskyi and Horodyshche Raions, as well as the cities of Cherkasy, Kaniv, and Smila, which were previously incorporated as cities of oblast significance and did not belong to any raion, were merged into Cherkasy Raion. The January 2020 estimate of the raion population was 73,883 (2020 est.).

The approximate length if the raion was 76 km (47 mi) and its width is up to 25 km (16 mi), and the raion consisted of 39 settlements - 38 villages and 1 urban-type settlement - Irdyn. There were 23 village councils (sil's'ka rada) in Cherkasy raion. The biggest villages of them were Ruska Polyana (Ukrainian: Руська Поляна), Chervona Sloboda (Ukrainian: Червона Слобода), Bilozirya (Ukrainian: Білозір'я), and Moshny (Ukrainian: Мошни). The area of the raion was 1,617 km^{2} (624 sq mi), with the density of 49 inhabitants per square kilometre (130/sq mi). The population consisted of Ukrainians (96.4%), Russians (2.9%), Belarusians (0.2%), and others (0.5%).

== Subdivisions ==
After the reform in July 2020, the raion consisted of 26 hromadas:

- Balakleia rural hromada with the administration in the selo of Balakleia, transferred from Smila Raion;
- Berezniaky rural hromada with the administration in the selo of Berezniaky, transferred from Smila Raion;
- Biloziria rural hromada with the administration in the selo of Biloziria, retained from Cherkasy Raion;
- Bobrytsia rural hromada with the administration in the selo of Bobrytsia, transferred from Kaniv Raion;
- Budyshche rural hromada with the administration in the selo of Budyshche, retained from Cherkasy Raion;
- Cherkasy urban hromada with the administration in the city of Cherkasy, transferred from Cherkasy Municipality;
- Chervona Sloboda rural hromada with the administration in the selo of Chervona Sloboda, retained from Cherkasy Raion;
- Chyhyryn urban hromada with the administration in the city of Chyhyryn, transferred from Chyhyryn Raion;
- Horodyshche urban hromada with the administration in the city of Horodyshche, transferred from Horodyshche Raion;
- Kamianka urban hromada with the administration in the city of Kamianka, transferred from Kamianka Raion;
- Kaniv urban hromada with the administration in the city of Kaniv, previously incorporated as a city of oblast significance;
- Korsun-Shevchenkivskyi urban hromada with the administration in the city of Korsun-Shevchenkivskyi, transferred from Korsun-Shevchenkivskyi Raion
- Lesky rural hromada with the administration in the selo of Lesky, retained from Cherkasy Raion;
- Lipliave rural hromada with the administration in the selo of Lipliave, transferred from Kaniv Raion;
- Medvedivka rural hromada with the administration in the selo of Medvedivka, transferred from Chyhyryn Raion;
- Mlyiv rural hromada with the administration in the selo of Mlyiv, transferred from Horodyshche Raion;
- Moshny rural hromada with the administration in the selo of Moshny, retained from Cherkasy Raion;
- Mykhailivka rural hromada with the administration in the selo of Mykhailivka, transferred from Kamianka Raion;
- Nabutiv rural hromada with the administration in the selo of Nabutiv, transferred from Korsun-Shevchenkivskyi Raion;
- Rotmistrivka rural hromada with the administration in the selo of Rotmistrivka, transferred from Smila Raion;
- Ruska Poliana rural hromada with the administration in the selo of Ruska Poliana, retained from Cherkasy Raion;
- Sahunivka rural hromada with the administration in the selo of Sahunivka, retained from Cherkasy Raion;
- Smila urban hromada with the administration in the city of Smila, transferred from Smila Municipality;
- Stepanky rural hromada with the administration in the selo of Stepanky, retained from Cherkasy Raion;
- Stepantsi rural hromada with the administration in the selo of Stepantsi, transferred from Kaniv Raion;
- Ternivka rural hromada with the administration in the selo of Ternivka, transferred from Smila Raion.

== Geography ==
The raion is located on lowlands, on the bank of Kremenchuk Reservoir, on the Dnieper. Rivers, such as the Ros, the Vilshyanka, and the Tyasmyn are flowing through the raion. Forests cover about 62 hectares of the district, including the famous Cherkasy Forest.

== Economy ==
=== Transportation ===
The raion is crossed with highways which connect Cherkasy with other cities like Kaniv, Zolotonosha, Uman. The length of all routes is 3,209 km (1,994 mi), from which 1,012 km (629 mi) are national routes. The region also hosts a part of Odesa-Moscow railway route.

== History ==
Since January 2015, the chairman of the district administration has been is Kostiantyn Omargaliev.

Cherkasy Raion in Cherkasy Oblast (1966-2020)

Before the 2020 reform, the raion consisted of eight hromadas:

- Biloziria rural hromada with the administration in Biloziria;
- Budyshche rural hromada with the administration in Budyshche;
- Chervona Sloboda rural hromada with the administration in Chervona Sloboda;
- Lesky rural hromada with the administration in Lesky;
- Moshny rural hromada with the administration in Moshny;
- Ruska Poliana rural hromada with the administration in Ruska Poliana;
- Sahunivka rural hromada with the administration in Sahunivka;
- Stepanky rural hromada with the administration in Stepanky.

== Notable people ==
- Andronicus Rudenko (1894-1951), Greek-Catholic priest and a convert from Russian Orthodoxy
- Valentyna Davydenko (born 1955), a recipient of the Honored Journalist of Ukraine
