= Verkhniachka =

Rural locality in Cherkasy Oblast, Ukraine

Verkhniachka Верхнячка
- Rural settlement
- Location of Verkhniachka in Ukraine Verkhniachka (Ukraine)
- Coordinates: 48°49′34″N 30°02′14″E
- Country: Ukraine
- Oblast: Cherkasy Oblast
- Raion: Uman Raion
- Founded: 1876
- Town status: 1960

Government
  - Town Head: Mykola Nakonechny
- Elevation: 231 m (758 ft)

Population (2022)
  - Total: 3,447
- Time zone: UTC+2 (EET)
  - Summer (DST): UTC+3 (EEST)
- Postal code: 20022
- Area code: +380 4745
- Website: rada.gov.ua

Verkhniachka (Ukrainian: Верхнячка), previously named Stari Korchaky (Ukrainian: Старі Корчаки), is a rural settlement in Uman Raion, Cherkasy Oblast, central Ukraine. It belongs to Khrystynivka urban hromada with the administration in the town of Khrystynivka, one of the hromadas of Ukraine. Population: 3,447 (2022 estimate).

== History ==
Until 18 July 2020, Verkhniachka belonged to Khrystynivka Raion. The raion was abolished in July 2020 as part of the administrative reform of Ukraine, which reduced the number of raions of Cherkasy Oblast to four. The area of Khrystynivka Raion was merged into Uman Raion.

Until 26 January 2024, Verkhniachka was designated urban-type settlement. On this day, a new law entered into force which abolished this status, and Verkhniachka became a rural settlement.

== Population ==
=== Language ===
Distribution of the population by native language according to the 2001 census:

Language	Number	Percentage
Ukrainian	4 192	97.69%
Russian	78	1.82%
Other^{[a]}	21	0.49%
Total	4 291	100.00%

^{a} Those who did not indicate their native language or indicated a language that was native to less than 1% of the local population.
