= Tsybuliv =

Rural locality in Cherkasy Oblast, Ukraine

Tsybuliv Цибулів
- Rural settlement
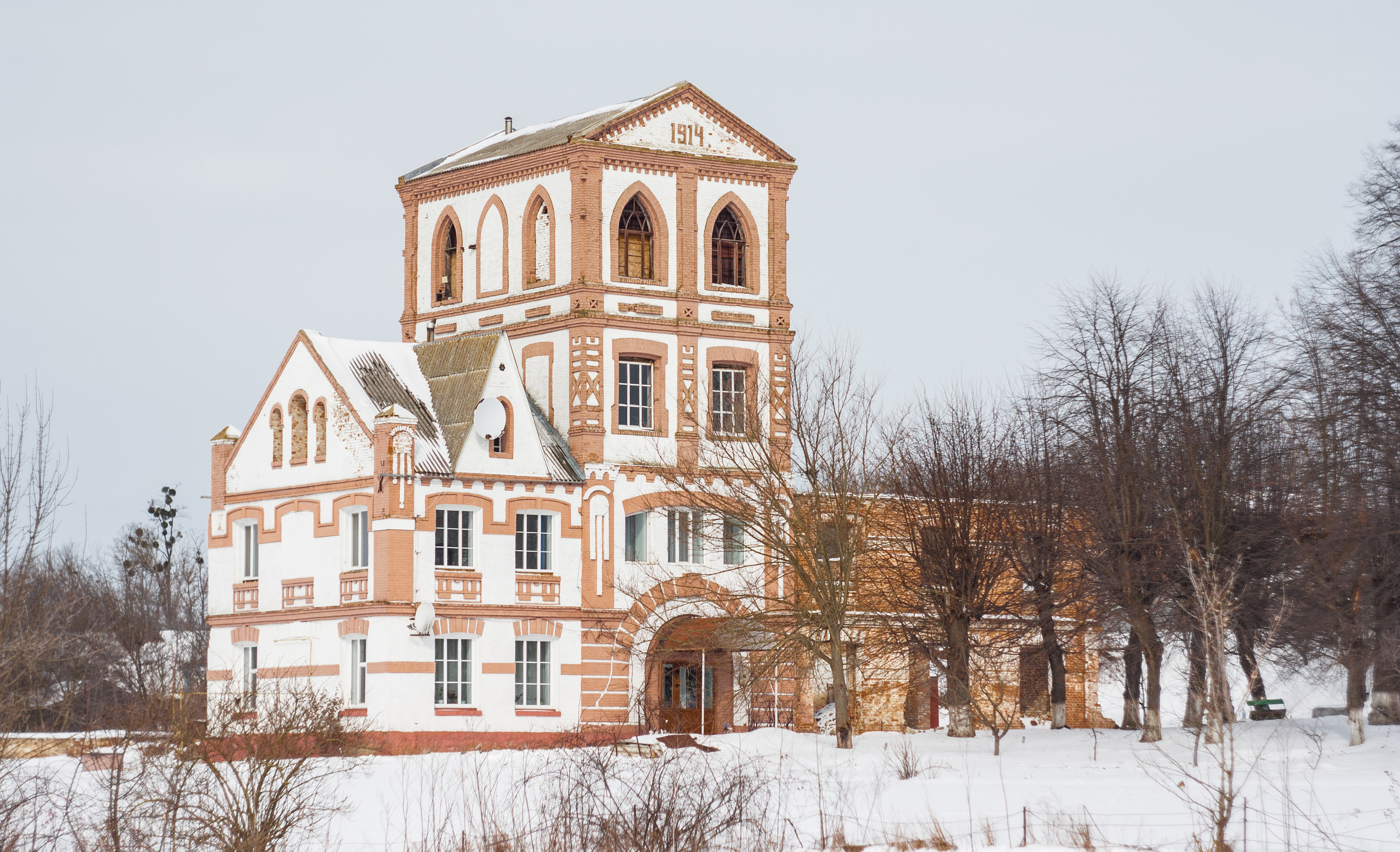
- The former ministerial school

- Location of Tsybuliv Tsybuliv (Ukraine)
- Coordinates: 49°04′12″N 29°51′0″E
- Country: Ukraine
- Oblast: Cherkasy Oblast
- Raion: Uman Raion

Population (2022)
  - Total: 3,436
- Postal code: 19114
- Area code: +380 4746

Tsybuliv (Ukrainian: Цибулів) is a rural settlement in Uman Raion, Cherkasy Oblast, central Ukraine. It is located in Monastyryshche urban hromada, one of the hromadas of Ukraine, the administration of which is located in the town of Monastyryshche. Population: 3,436 (2022 estimate).

== History ==
Until 18 July 2020, Tsybuliv belonged to Monastyryshche Raion. The raion was abolished in July 2020 as part of the administrative reform of Ukraine, which reduced the number of raions of Cherkasy Oblast to four. The area of Monastyryshche Raion was merged into Uman Raion.

Until 26 January 2024, Tsybuliv was designated urban-type settlement. On this day, a new law entered into force which abolished this status, and Tsybuliv became a rural settlement.
