= Ivanhorod =

Village in Cherkasy Oblast, Ukraine

Ivanhorod Івангород
- Village
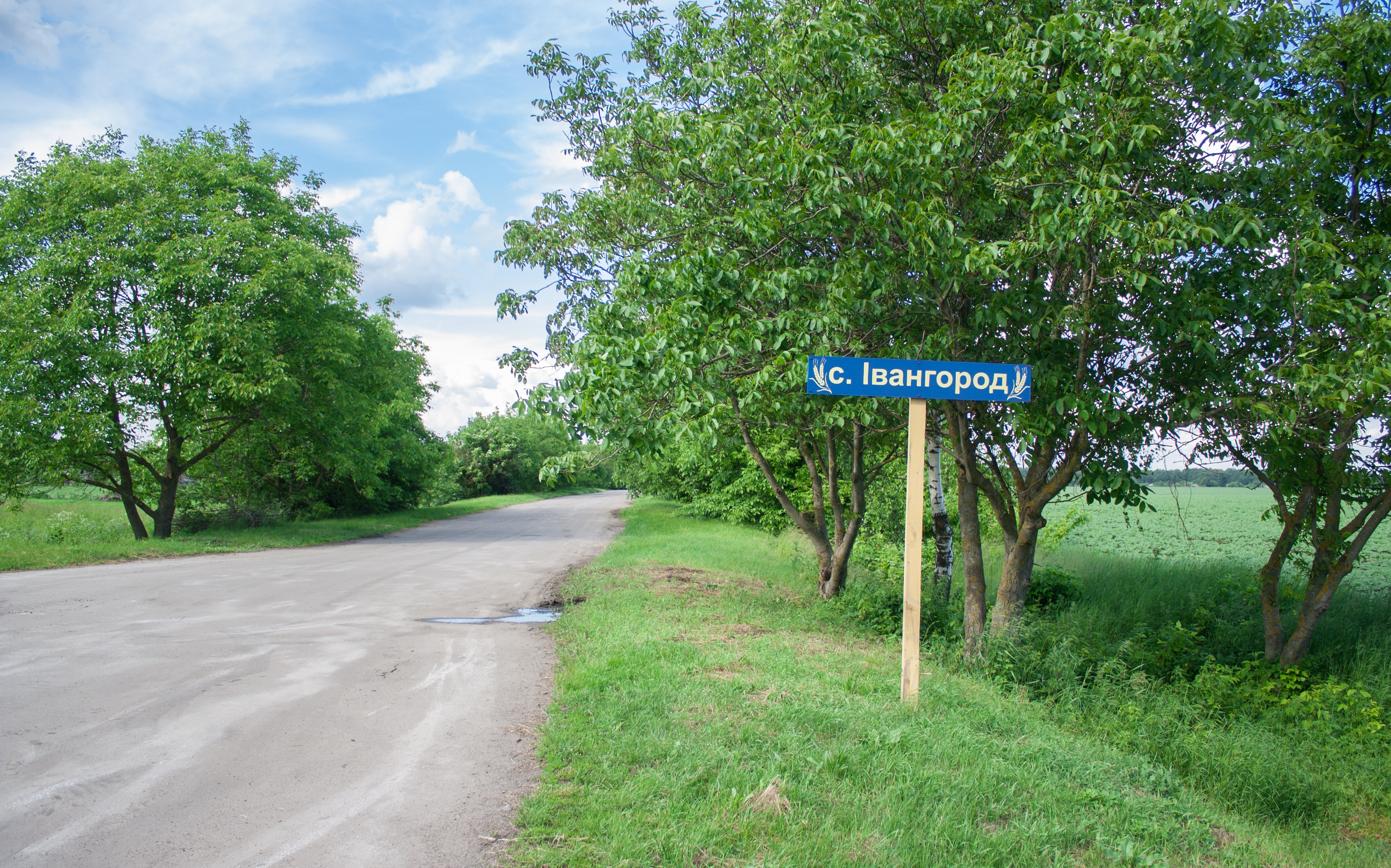
- Ivanhorod road sign

- Location of Ivanhorod in Ukraine Ivanhorod (Cherkasy Oblast)
- Coordinates: 48°48′10″N 29°48′09″E
- Country: Ukraine
- Oblast: Cherkasy Oblast
- Raion: Uman Raion
- Hromada: Khrystynivka urban hromada

Population (2001)
  - Total: 1,193
- Time zone: UTC+2 (EET)
  - Summer (DST): UTC+3 (EEST)
- Postal code: 20040
- Area code: +380 4745

Ivanhorod (Ukrainian: Івангород) (Note: Also known in other languages: Russian: Ивангород Ivangorod; Polish: Iwangród) is a village in Uman Raion, Cherkasy Oblast, central Ukraine. It is located 151 kilometres (94 mi) from the capital Kyiv. It belongs to Khrystynivka urban hromada with the administration in the town of Khrystynivka, one of the hromadas of Ukraine.

== History ==
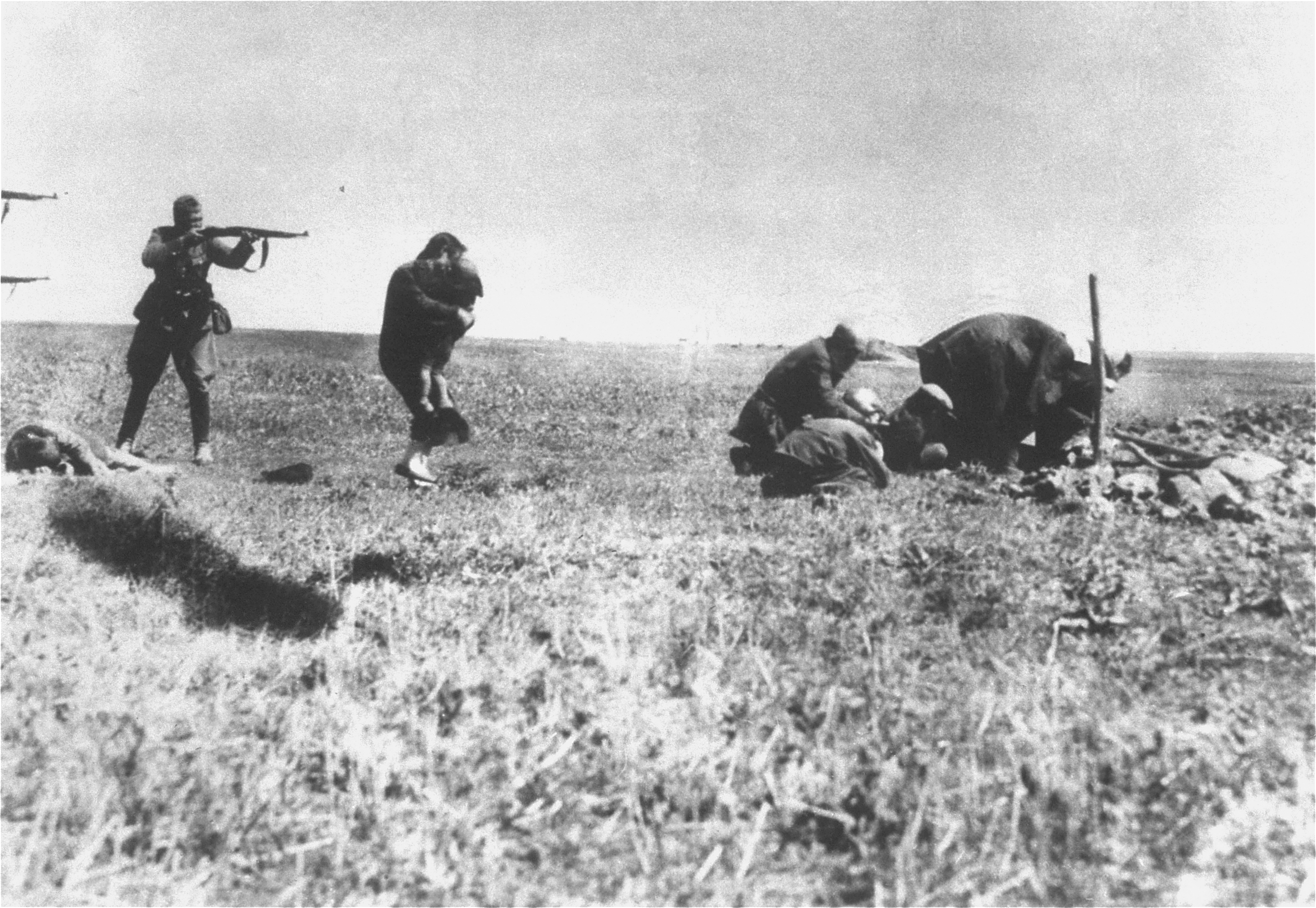
Ivanhorod Einsatzgruppen photograph: execution of Jews near Ivanhorod by German Einsatzgruppe during World War II.

The first traces of a settlement date back to prehistoric times, with archeological findings from the Cucuteni-Trypillian culture. In the Middle Ages Ivanhorod lay on the Chumak trade road from Kyiv to Crimea. From the 13th century on, it was part of the Grand Duchy of Lithuania and subsequently, until 1791, the Polish–Lithuanian Commonwealth. The village (from 1609 owned by the Kalinowski family) lay on the path of the Khmelnytsky Uprising. After the Second Partition of Poland Iwanogród became part of the Russian Empire.

The Jewish community in Ivanhorod dates back to early 19th century. In 1897, the Jewish population was 442 people. During the Holocaust (on what is now Ukrainian territory), a mass murder was committed by the German Einsatzgruppe in the southern part of Ivanhorod (1942) with an unknown number of victims. It is known by the Ivanhorod Einsatzgruppen photograph.

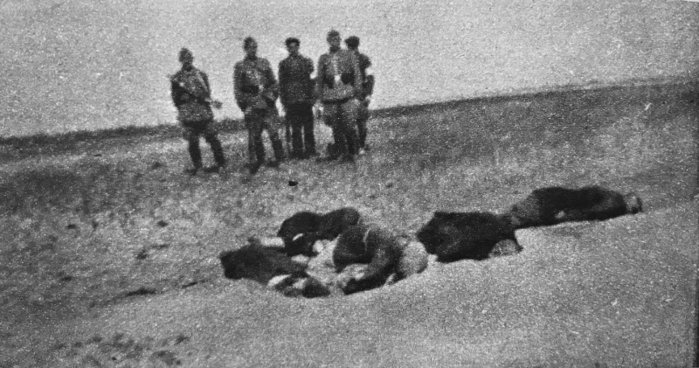
Germany's Einsatzgruppen with murdered Jewish civilians in Ivanhorod, Ukraine (1942) which appeared in Świat

Until 18 July 2020, Ivanhorod belonged to Khrystynivka Raion. The raion was abolished in July 2020 as part of the administrative reform of Ukraine, which reduced the number of raions of Cherkasy Oblast to four. The area of Khrystynivka Raion was merged into Uman Raion.

== Population ==
=== Language ===
Distribution of the population by native language according to the 2001 census:

Language	Number	Percentage
Ukrainian	1 167	97.82%
Russian	20	1.68%
Other	6	0.50%
Total	1 193	100.00%

== Economy ==
As of 2013, Ivanhorod had 504 employed residents, with the main economic activity being agriculture. There is a school in the village, a library with 18,000 books, a medical clinic with 9 employees, pharmacy, a post office, a bank, and several large farms.
