= Adamivka =

Adamivka (Ukrainian: Адамівка) may refer to several places in Ukraine:

== Places ==
Cherkasy Oblast

- Adamivka, Cherkasy Oblast, rural settlement in Uman Raion

Chernihiv Oblast

- Adamivka, Borzna urban hromada, Nizhyn Raion, Chernihiv Oblast, village in Borzna urban hromada, Nizhyn Raion
- Adamivka, Nosivka urban hromada, Nizhyn Raion, Chernihiv Oblast, village in Nosivka urban hromada, Nizhyn Raion

Dnipropetrovsk Oblast

- Adamivka, Dnipropetrovsk Oblast, village in Kamianske Raion

Donetsk Oblast

- Adamivka, Donetsk Oblast, village in Kramatorsk Raion

Khmelnytskyi Oblast

- Adamivka, Kamianets-Podilskyi Raion, Khmelnytskyi Oblast, village in Kamianets-Podilskyi Raion
- Adamivka, Derazhnia urban hromada, Khmelnytskyi Raion, Khmelnytskyi Oblast, village in Derazhnia urban hromada, Khmelnytskyi Raion
- Adamivka, Zinkiv rural hromada, Khmelnytskyi Raion, Khmelnytskyi Oblast, village in Zinkiv rural hromada, Khmelnytskyi Raion

Lviv Oblast

- Adamivka, Lviv Oblast, village in Sheptytskyi Raion

Mykolaiv Oblast

- Adamivka, Mykolaiv Oblast, village in Pervomaisk Raion

Odesa Oblast

- Adamivka, Berezivka Raion, Odesa Oblast, village in Berezivka Raion
- Adamivka, Bilhorod-Dnistrovskyi Raion, Odesa Oblast, village in Bilhorod-Dnistrovskyi Raion
- Adamivka, Podilsk Raion, Odesa Oblast, village in Podilsk Raion

Rivne Oblast

- Adamivka, Dubno Raion, Rivne Oblast, village in Dubno Raion
- Adamivka, Rivne Raion, Rivne Oblast, village in Rivne Raion

Vinnytsia Oblast

- Adamivka, Haisyn Raion, Vinnytsia Oblast, village in Haisyn Raion
- Adamivka, Khmilnyk Raion, Vinnytsia Oblast, village in Khmilnyk Raion
- Adamivka, Vinnytsia Raion, Vinnytsia Oblast, village in Vinnytsia Raion
- Adamivka, Zhmerynka Raion, Vinnytsia Oblast, village in Zhmerynka Raion

Volyn Oblast

- Adamivka, Volyn Oblast, village in Kovel Raion

Zhytomyr Oblast

- Adamivka, Zhytomyr Oblast, village in Zviahel Raion
