= Okhmativ =

Village in Cherkasy Oblast, Ukraine

Coordinates: 49°09′55″N 30°13′20″E

Okhmativ (Ukrainian: Охматів, Polish: Ochmatów) is a village in Uman Raion, Cherkasy Oblast, Ukraine with about 800 inhabitants. It belongs to Bashtechky rural hromada, one of the hromadas of Ukraine.

It (or its vicinity) was the site of two large battles in the 17th century: Battle of Ochmatów (1644) and Battle of Okhmativ (1655).

Until 18 July 2020, Okhmativ belonged to Zhashkiv Raion. The raion was abolished in July 2020 as part of the administrative reform of Ukraine, which reduced the number of raions of Cherkasy Oblast to four. The area of Zhashkiv Raion was merged into Uman Raion.
