= Adamivka, Cherkasy Oblast =

Rural settlement in Cherkasy Oblast, Ukraine

Adamivka Адамівка
- Rural settlement
- Location of Adamivka Adamivka (Ukraine)
- Coordinates: 49°08′53″N 29°56′30″E
- Country: Ukraine
- Oblast: Cherkasy Oblast
- Raion: Uman Raion
- Hromada: Zhashkiv urban hromada
- Elevation: 194 m (636 ft)

Population (2001)
  - Total: 55
- Postal code: 19242
- Climate: Cfa

Adamivka (Ukrainian: Адамівка) is a rural settlement in Uman Raion, Cherkasy Oblast (province) of Ukraine. It belongs to Zhashkiv urban hromada, one of the hromadas of Ukraine. It is located 22 km (14 mi) southwest of the city of Zhashkiv.

== Geography ==
Near the rural settlement of Adamivka, there is a hydrological reserve called Shuliaky Swamp.

== History ==
Adamivka suffered as a result of the genocide of the Ukrainian people carried out by Soviet government in 1932-1933 and 1946–1947.

Until 18 July 2020, Adamivka was previously located in the Zhashkiv Raion. The raion was abolished in July 2020 as part of the administrative reform of Ukraine, which reduced the number of raions of Cherkasy Oblast to four. The area of Zhashkiv Raion was merged into Zvenyhorodka Raion.
