= Monistritch (Hasidic dynasty) =

Rabbi Mordchai Rosen was head dean and grand rabbi of the village of Monistrich, known as Monastyrysche in Ukrainian, a town presently in Cherkasy Oblast (province) of Ukraine. He perished during the Holocaust in World War II.
