= Dokiya Humenna =

Ukrainian and Ukrainian American author

- Докія Гуменна
- Born: March 10, 1906; Zhashkiv, Russian Empire (now Zhashkiv, Uman Raion, Cherkasy Oblast, Ukraine)
- Died: April 4, 1996 (aged 92); Manhattan, New York, United States
- Occupation: Writer

Dokiya Kuzmivna Humenna (Note: Ukrainian: Докія Кузьмівна Гуменна, romanized: Dokiia Kuzmivna Humenna) (March 10, 1904 – April 4, 1996) was a Ukrainian and Ukrainian American writer, one of the most prolific authors of the literary Ukrainian diaspora.

== Biography ==
Dokiya Humenna was born on 10(23) March 1904 in the village of Zhashkiv, Kyiv Governorate, Russian Empire. She was born to a peasant family (line of her father Kuzma Humenny). Her mother, Dariya Kravchenko, came from an impoverished noble family. Humenna studied in Zvenygorodska gymnasium. In 1920 she entered a teachers' college in Stavyshche. Finally, she studied literature at the University of Kyiv, graduating in 1926.

Her first literary essay "U Stepu" (In the Steppe, 1924) secured her a place in the major Soviet Ukrainian literary magazines, and she joined the union of rural writers «Pluh» ("The Plough"). Humenna's cycles of essays and novels Lysty z Stepovoyi Ukrainy (Letters from the Ukraine Steppe, 1928–1929), Strelka kolebletsja (The Arrow is Oscillating, 1930), Kampanija ("The Campaign") and «Eh, Kuban Ty Kuban Khliborodnaya», 1929) were published in the magazines Pluh and Chervonyi shlyah, and described the decline of Ukrainian life and culture. These works provoked harsh censure from the Soviet regime, and Humenna was not admitted to the newly created Union of the Writers of Ukraine and she was silenced, although she escaped more dire punishment.

She had to work as a stenographer in Kyiv. In 1937 she participated in the during excavations of Tripolie culture settlements in Kyiv. In 1940 she published a short story, "Virus," which led to another round of harsh criticism. During World War II, she was forced to emigrate in 1943, traveling on foot to Lviv, where she contributed to the local journals.

After the war, she emigrated to Austria and Germany. During her stay in displaced persons' camps in 1946–1949, she joined the artistic-literary organization Mystetsky Ukrainsky Rukh (MUR). Humenna published the collection "Kurkulska Viliya" (1946) and embarked on her major four-volume work, Dity Chumatskoho Shliakhu ("Children of the Milky Way", 1948–1951), which she completed after moving to the United States for permanent residence in 1950. She became a U.S. citizen in 1959. She was active in Ukrainian American organizations, and started to publish the literary works which she had not been able to publish in Ukraine. H She is the author of more than 20 books that put her among the most fruitful writers of the Ukrainian diaspora.

She was interested in the history and archeology of Ukraine and ancient art. She was also interested in discovering the origin of spiritual life of her ancestors. Her abiding interest in feminism, prehistoric life, mythology and archaeology are evident in works such as "Mana" ("Delusion", 1952), "Velyke Tsabe" ("The Great Tsabe", 1952, an accessible exposition of Trypillian culture), "Zolotyi Pluh" ("The Golden Plough", 1968) and others. Her travels are reflected in the collection of essays "Bahato Neba" ("A Lot of Sky", 1954) and "Vichni Vohni Alberty" ("The Eternal Flames of Alberta", 1959), and in the short stories in "Sered Khmarosiahiv" ("Among the Skyscrapers", 1962). Humenna was directly involved in the creation of the Association of Ukrainian writers "Slovo".

Dokiya Humenna died on April 4. 1996 in her apartment in Manhattan, New York City. She was buried at the St. Andrew Ukrainian Orthodox Cemetery in South Bound Brook, New Jersey.
