= Jerzy Tomaszewski =

Jerzy Tomaszewski is the name of:

- Jerzy Tomaszewski (photographer) (1924–2016), Polish photographer and journalist
- Jerzy Tomaszewski (historian) (1930–2014), Polish historian and academic
