= Volodymyrivka, Cherkasy Oblast =

Rural settlement in Cherkasy Oblast, Ukraine

Volodymyrivka Володимирівка
- Rural settlement
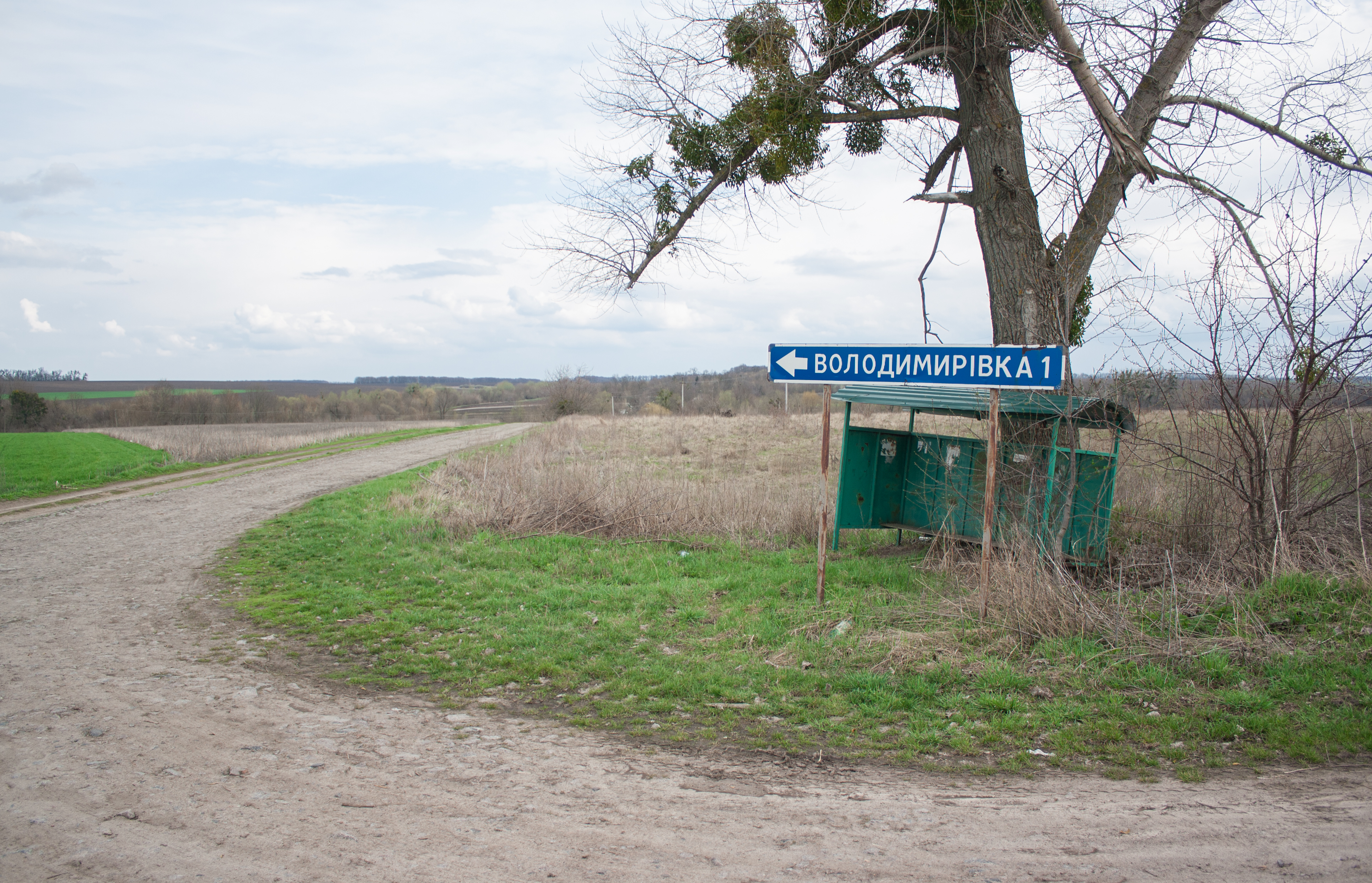

- Location of Volodymyrivka Volodymyrivka (Ukraine)
- Coordinates: 48°54′36″N 29°54′45″E
- Country: Ukraine
- Oblast: Cherkasy Oblast
- Raion: Uman Raion

Population (2001)
  - Total: 69
- Postal code: 19154
- Area code: +380 4746
- Climate: Cfa

Volodymyrivka (Ukrainian: Володимирівка) is a rural settlement in Uman Raion, Cherkasy Oblast, Ukraine.

Until 18 July 2020, Volodymyrivka was located in the Monastyryshche Raion. The raion was abolished in July 2020 as part of the administrative reform of Ukraine, which reduced the number of raions of Cherkasy Oblast to four. The area of Monastyryshche Raion was merged into Uman Raion.
