= Battle of Ochmatów =

Battle of Ochmatów can refer to:

- Battle of Ochmatów (1644), a battle between the Polish-Lithuanian Commonwealth and a horde of Crimean Tatars
- Battle of Ochmatów (1655), a battle between the Polish-Lithuanian Commonwealth and Russian Tsardom
