= Ivanhorod Einsatzgruppen photograph =

Photograph of Nazi atrocities in Ukraine

Coordinates: 48°47′05.4″N 29°47′14.5″E

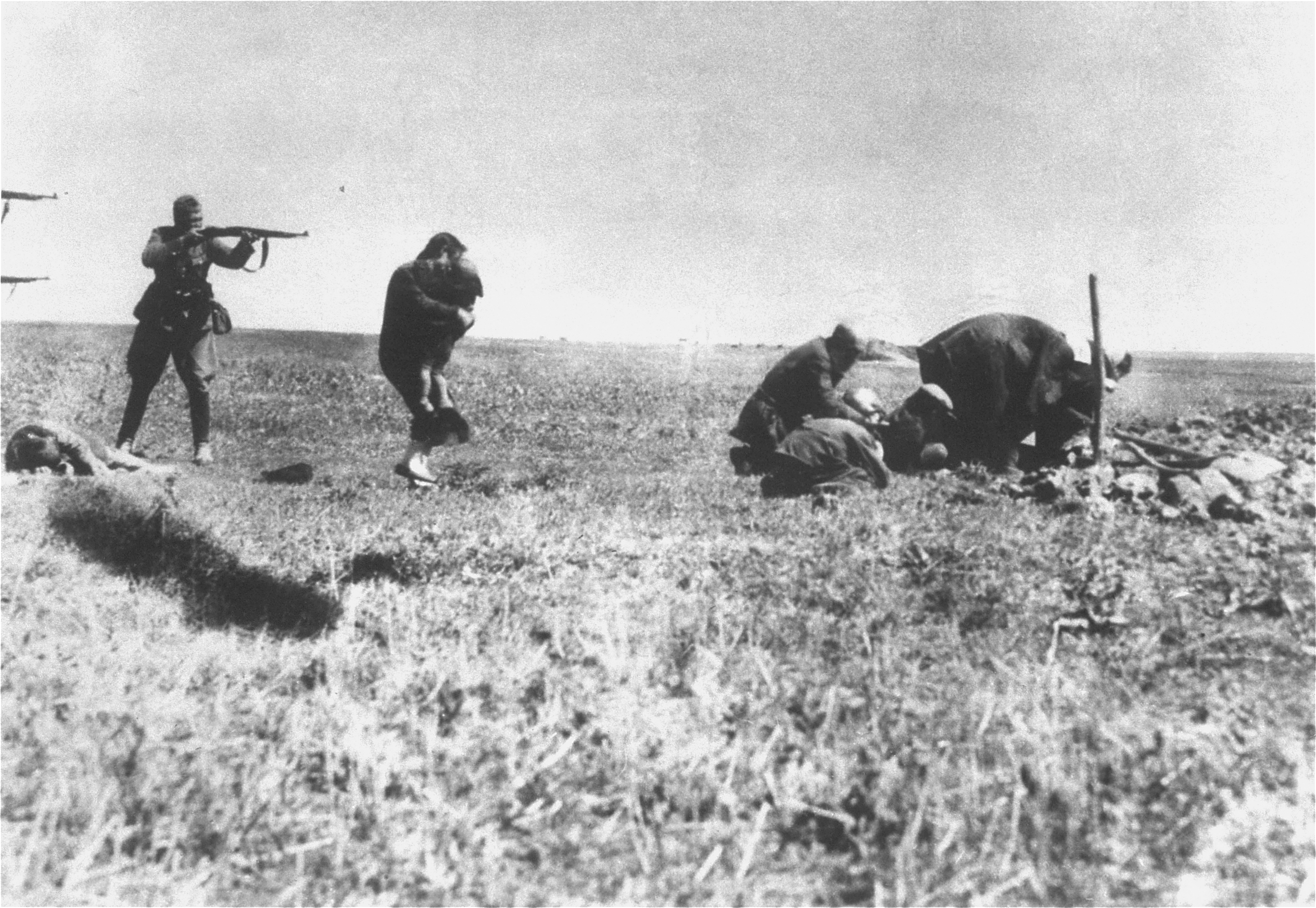
The photograph

The Ivanhorod Einsatzgruppen photograph is a prominent depiction of the Holocaust in Ukraine during World War II. Dated to 1942, it shows an Einsatzgruppen member aiming his rifle at a woman trying to shield a child with her body, portraying one of numerous genocidal killings carried out against Jews by the Einsatzgruppen within German-occupied Europe. The photograph was taken in Ivanhorod, a village in what was then German-occupied Ukraine, before being mailed to Germany. However, the Polish resistance movement intercepted the photograph in Warsaw, and it was subsequently kept as Holocaust imagery by the Polish photographer Jerzy Tomaszewski.

The photograph was first published for public consumption in Poland in 1959 and quickly spread across the Western world. In the 1960s, far-right West German newspapers alleged that the photograph was a forgery by the government of the Polish People's Republic, but that claim was eventually proven false. Since becoming popularly known, it has been frequently used in written works and by museums and exhibitions on the Holocaust. The British photographic historian Janina Struk described the photograph as "a symbol of the barbarity of the Nazi regime and their industrial-scale murder of six million European Jews."

== Background ==
During the Holocaust, more than a million Jews were murdered in Ukraine. Most of them were shot in mass executions by the Einsatzgruppen (Nazi German paramilitary death squads) and Ukrainian collaborators. In 1897, the Russian Empire census recorded 442 Jews (out of a population of 3,032) living in Ivanhorod, a village in modern-day Cherkasy Oblast, Ukraine. In 1942, a mass execution by Einsatzgruppen personnel south of the village killed an unknown number of victims. Part of the massacre is depicted in this photograph. Following the war, the execution site was used as a field of a collective farm.

== Photograph ==
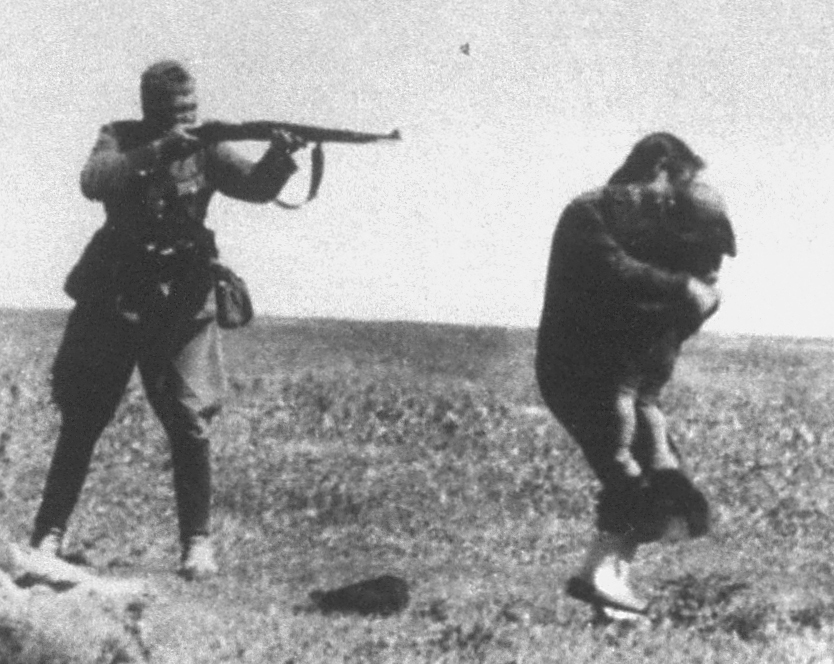
Cropped photograph as it often appears in publications

There are six victims in the photograph. The body lying at the feet of the German soldier appears to be a woman who was already shot. In the center of the photograph is a woman who appears to be shielding a child. One of her feet is raised as if she is trying to flee, or else the photograph was taken just after she was shot. To her right are three men. Only one soldier is fully visible in the picture; he appears to be aiming at the woman and child. Rifles held by German soldiers off the left edge of the photograph are visible and point at the woman and child. The shadows at the left edge of the photograph suggest that more German soldiers may be present. A wooden stake and a shovel are visible on the right side of the photo, indicating that the victims may have been forced to dig their own graves.

The identity of the photographer is unknown, but he was probably a German soldier . Many German soldiers photographed atrocities in which they were complicit. The Einsatzgruppen unit responsible was most likely Einsatzkommando 5. From November 1941 to January 1942, Einsatzkommando 5 troops were stationed in Kyiv, Zhytomyr, Rivne, and Vinnytsia. Ivanhorod lies between Rivne and Vinnytsia.

== Discovery and publication ==
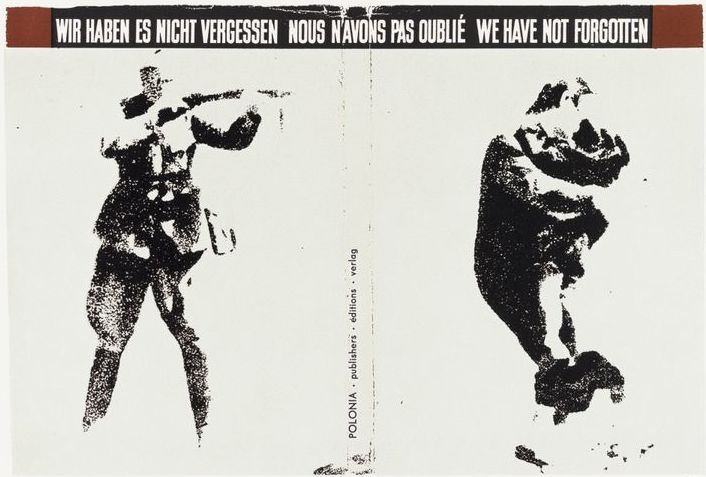
The image as it appeared on the cover of the 1959 book

The Polish resistance movement infiltrated the postal office in Warsaw in order to intercept sensitive correspondence, which they sent to the Polish government-in-exile in London. Non-Jewish Poles and Jews alike were forbidden to own cameras by the German occupational authorities, but the Polish resistance established underground workshops for developing clandestine photographs of Nazi atrocities. Jerzy Tomaszewski, a Polish teenager who worked with an underground lab called "Foto-Rys", intercepted a photograph with the words "Ukraine 1942, Judenaktion [Jewish Action], Iwangorod [Ivanhorod]" written on the reverse. He kept the original, which remains in his personal archive; a copy was sent to the Polish government-in-exile in London.

The photograph was first published in Poland in 1959 by the Society of Fighters for Freedom and Democracy on the cover of a book of photographs entitled 1939–1945. We have not forgotten / Nous n'avons pas oublié / Wir haben es nicht vergessen. Tomaszewski worked as one of the editors, although he knew that the book was using the photographs for propaganda purposes of the Polish People's Republic; he supported the publication because there was no other way to print the photographs. Many publications crop the image to the one soldier, the woman, and the child. The British photography historian Janina Struk stated that cropping the image omits "the less emotional and more confusing parts of the picture". The educator Adam Muller claimed that while the cropped version highlights "the catastrophic intensity of the mother–child bond", it also removes the surroundings and context from consideration. The full version reveals that the scene is not one of personal suffering and individual brutality, but a mass execution.

Since then, the Ivanhorod photograph has been reproduced in many written works and used by museums and exhibitions relating to the Holocaust. In her 1998 book Reading the Holocaust, it was described by the Australian historian Inga Clendinnen as "iconic in its distillation of German atrocity". According to the English journalist Robert Fisk, the photograph is "one of the most impressive and persuasive images of the Nazi Holocaust". Struk stated that it "has become a symbol of the barbarity of the Nazi regime and of the murder of 6 million European Jews".

== Falsification allegations ==
The far-right West German newspaper Deutsche Soldaten-Zeitung (DSZ, German Soldiers' Newspaper) printed an allegation on 26 January 1962 by Otto Croy, known for his writings on photographic technique, under the title Achtung Fälschungen ("Beware Fakes"). Croy claimed that the photograph had been fabricated by the communist government of Poland in order to falsely accuse Germany of war crimes; he alleged that the image did not depict a German serviceman and that the weapons and uniforms were not authentic. Before publishing 1939–1945. We have not forgotten, the West German publishing house Verlag Kurt Desch had verified the authenticity of the image by writing to Roman Karsk, a professor of German literature at the University of Warsaw, and he replied that it was a faithful copy of an image held by the historical archives in Warsaw depicting mass shootings in 1942.

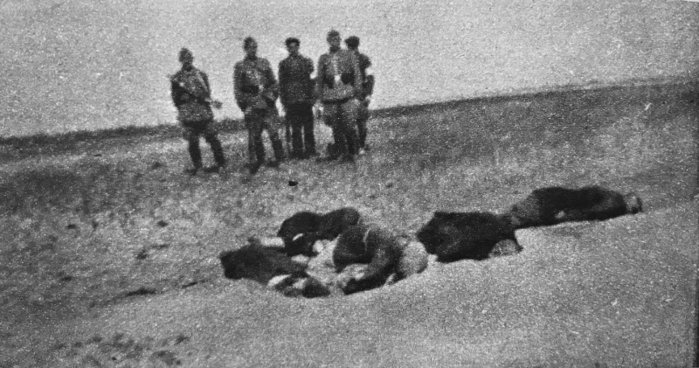
The image published by Tomaszewski and Mazur in Świat on 25 February 1962

In response to the allegations, Tomaszewski and Tadeusz Mazur (one of the editors of 1939–1945. We have not forgotten) published another image from the same source in the Polish magazine Świat on 25 February. The second image depicted five armed men, one in civilian clothes and the other four in uniform, standing and looking at the camera over a pile of corpses. It bore several similarities to the better-known photograph but lacked "dramatic impact" according to Struk. The flat, barren terrain was identical; one of the men bore a strong resemblance to a German serviceman in the previous photograph; and the words "Ukraine 1942" had been written on the back of the image in the same handwriting. In the article, Tomaszewski denounced the DSZ as apologists for Nazi Germany and accused the newspaper of historical revisionism.

The allegations continued to be recirculated in the West German press for more than two years in what Tomaszewski described as a "press war". The Polish government was concerned about a potential diplomatic incident if the image was in fact a falsification, and they sent officials to Tomaszewski's home to inspect the image. In 1965, Der Spiegel published a letter from Kurt Vieweg, a veteran of an Order Police battalion stationed in German-occupied Norway who confirmed that the weapons and uniforms matched those used by his unit and Einsatzgruppen personnel.

== See also ==
- Nazi crimes against children
