= Zhashkiv =

City in Cherkasy Oblast, Ukraine

Zhashkiv Жашків
- City
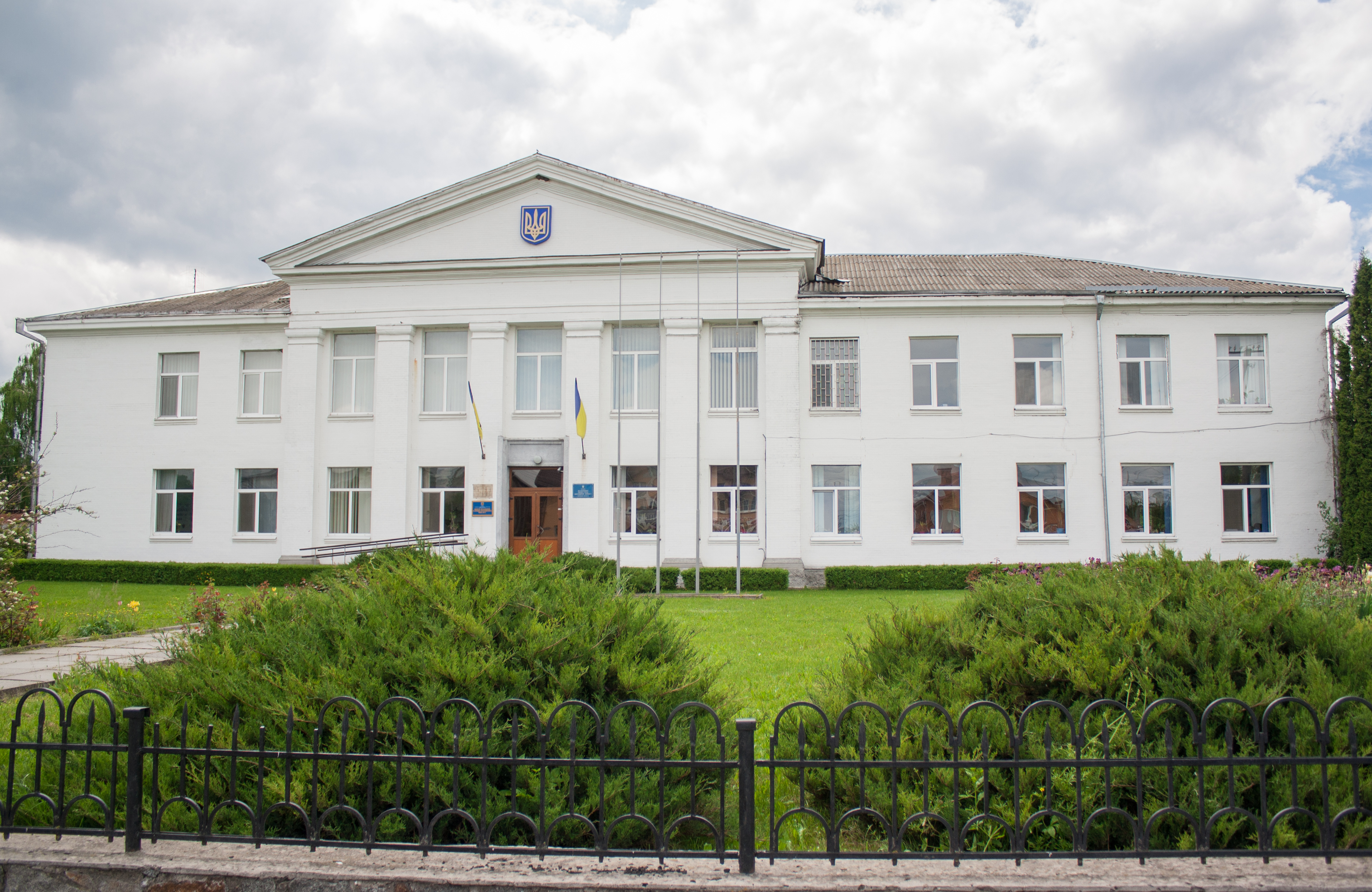
- Zhashkiv city hall

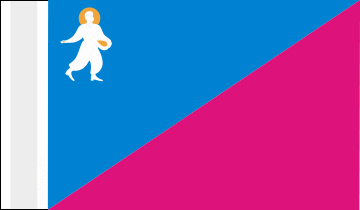
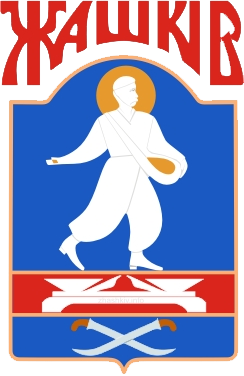
- Flag Coat of arms
- Interactive map of Zhashkiv
- Location within Cherkasy Oblast Location within Ukraine
- Coordinates: 49°14′09″N 30°06′40″E
- Country: Ukraine
- Oblast: Cherkasy Oblast
- Raion: Uman Raion
- Hromada: Zhashkiv urban hromada
- Founded: 1636
- City rights: 1956

Government
  - Mayor: Ihor Cybrovskyj

Area
  - Total: 130 km^{2} (50 sq mi)
- Elevation: 229 m (751 ft)

Population (2022)
  - Total: 13,242
- Demonym: Zhashkivchány (Ukrainian: жашківча́ни)
- Postal code: 19200—19208
- Area code: +380-4747
- Website: zhashkivrada.gov.ua; zhashkiv.info

Zhashkiv (Ukrainian: Жашків, IPA: [ˈʒɑʃkiu̯]) is a city in Uman Raion, Cherkasy Oblast (province) of Ukraine. It hosts the administration of Zhashkiv urban hromada, one of the hromadas of Ukraine. It had a population of 13,242 (2022 estimate).

== Administrative status ==
Zhashkiv gained status as a city in 1956. Until 18 July 2020, Zhashkiv served as an administrative center of Zhashkiv Raion. The raion was abolished in July 2020 as part of the administrative reform of Ukraine, which reduced the number of raions of Cherkasy Oblast to four. The area of Zhashkiv Raion was merged into Uman Raion.

== Geography ==
Zhashkiv lies on the Dnieper Upland.

== History ==
=== Old Zhashkiv ===
The first mention of Zhashkiv was found in documents of the beginning of the 17th century, the town was officially mentioned on October 16 (according to the old style) in 1636 - a report that at the confluence of the Kozina Rudka river with the Rava Zhashkivska river, above the Skybyn Dam, a settlement was laid. The name "Zhashkiv" is also found on Guillaume Lavasseur De Beauplan's map. At that time, it belonged to the Tetiiv estates of the Ostrozki princes.

=== Modern History ===
From the end of the 18th century, the settlement became part of the Russian Empire.

Since 1796, Zhashkiv belongs to the Poles - Hryhoriy Zakrevskiy, two years later - Jan Tarnowiecki. After the death of Tarnovetskyi's son Jan in 1852, Zhashkiv was divided into two parts between the sisters Solomiya Rakovskaya and Palageya Charkovskaya.

In 1840, Zhashkiv was classified as a small town.

Since the end of the 19th century, Orthodox Christians lived in the city - 1,533 people, Catholics - 52 people, and the Jewish community - 556 people. In 1862, two churches and three synagogues operated here.

In 1860 — a sugar factory began operating in Zhashkiv. The enterprise has 350 workers, of which 260 are self-employed.

=== At the beginning of the 20th century ===
In 1917, Zhashkiv became part of the newly created Ukrainian People's Republic.

The first occupation of communist Moscow in February–March 1918 did not affect the Zhashkiv too much.

After the Hetman coup and the beginning of the repression of the Hetman government and the German occupiers against the peasantry, on June 8, 1918, a partisan unit from Zhashkiv arrived in nearby Stryzhavka to participate in the uprising against the Hetman government and the German occupiers.

The second occupation of communist Moscow, under which Zhashkiv fell in March 1919, caused an active insurgent movement there, directed against it.

Since 1922, Zhashkiv has been part of the USSR.

A local newspaper has been published in the city since September 1931. The parents of Moshe Dayan were originally from Zhashkiv.

=== Population losses in the Soviet period ===
In 1922, Soviet power was established in the city. The city became part of the USSR.

At the end of 1922, Zhashkiv was assigned to the Uman district, and from April of the following year it became the center of the newly formed Zhashkiv district of the Uman district.

More than 5 thousand residents of Zhashkiv died during the Holodomor (1932-1933).

On July 19, 1941, Zhashkiv was occupied by German troops. On January 6, 1944, the city was liberated by the troops of the 1st Ukrainian Front.

=== Declaration of Independence of Ukraine ===
On December 1, 1991, the residents of the city voted by an absolute majority for the restoration of Ukraine's state independence and withdrawal from the USSR.

== Demographics ==
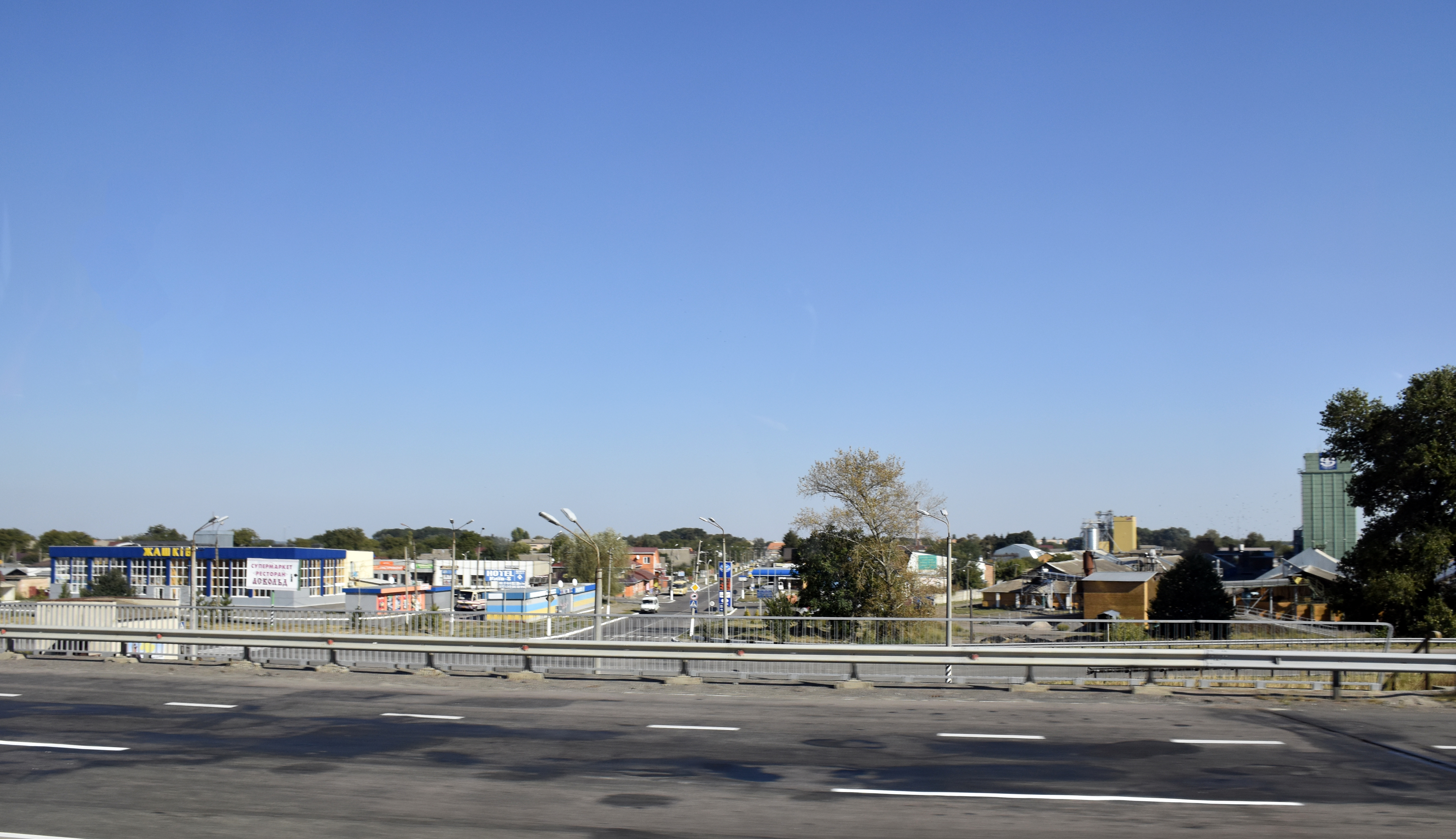
E95/M05 highway in Zhashkiv

In 1989, the population of the city was 16,484 people. In 2013, the population of the city was 14,234 people.

== Economy and transport ==
Zhashkiv is a historical centre of sugar industry. The city is the end point of a railway branch connected to the line Kyiv-Vinnytsia.

== Notable people ==
- Dokiya Humenna, Ukrainian writer

== Gallery ==
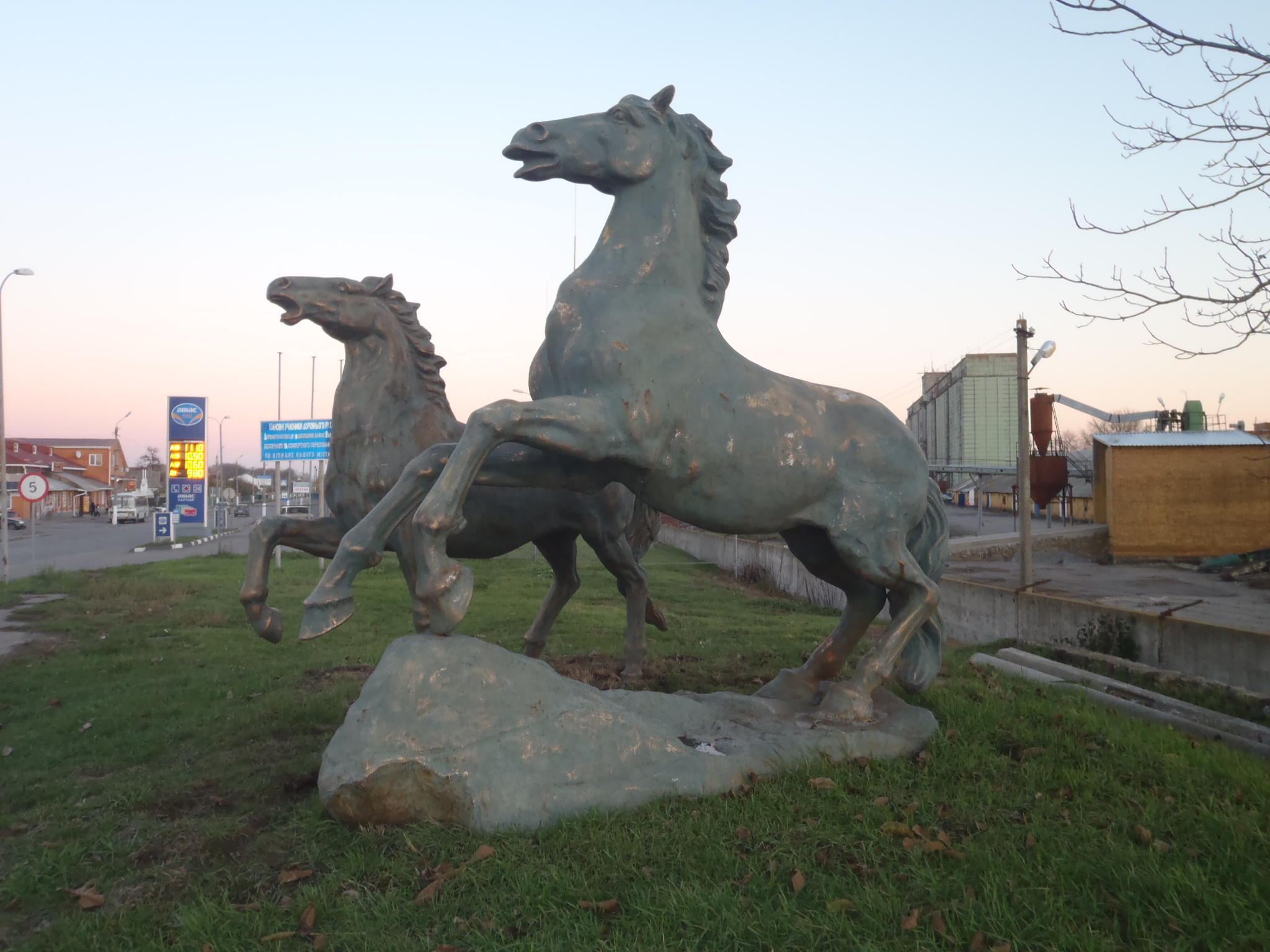
Horse statues in Zhashkiv

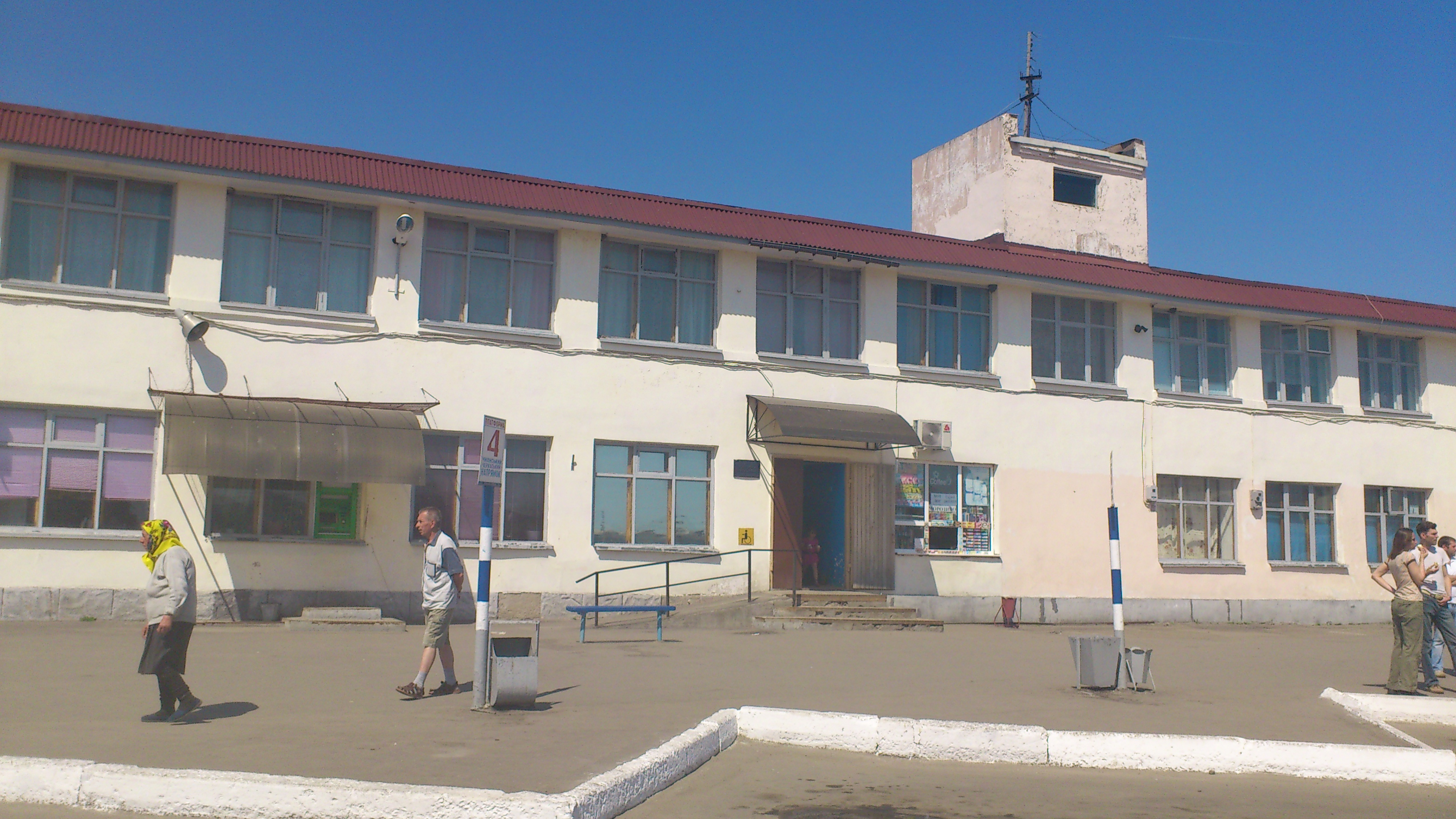
Zhashkiv bus station

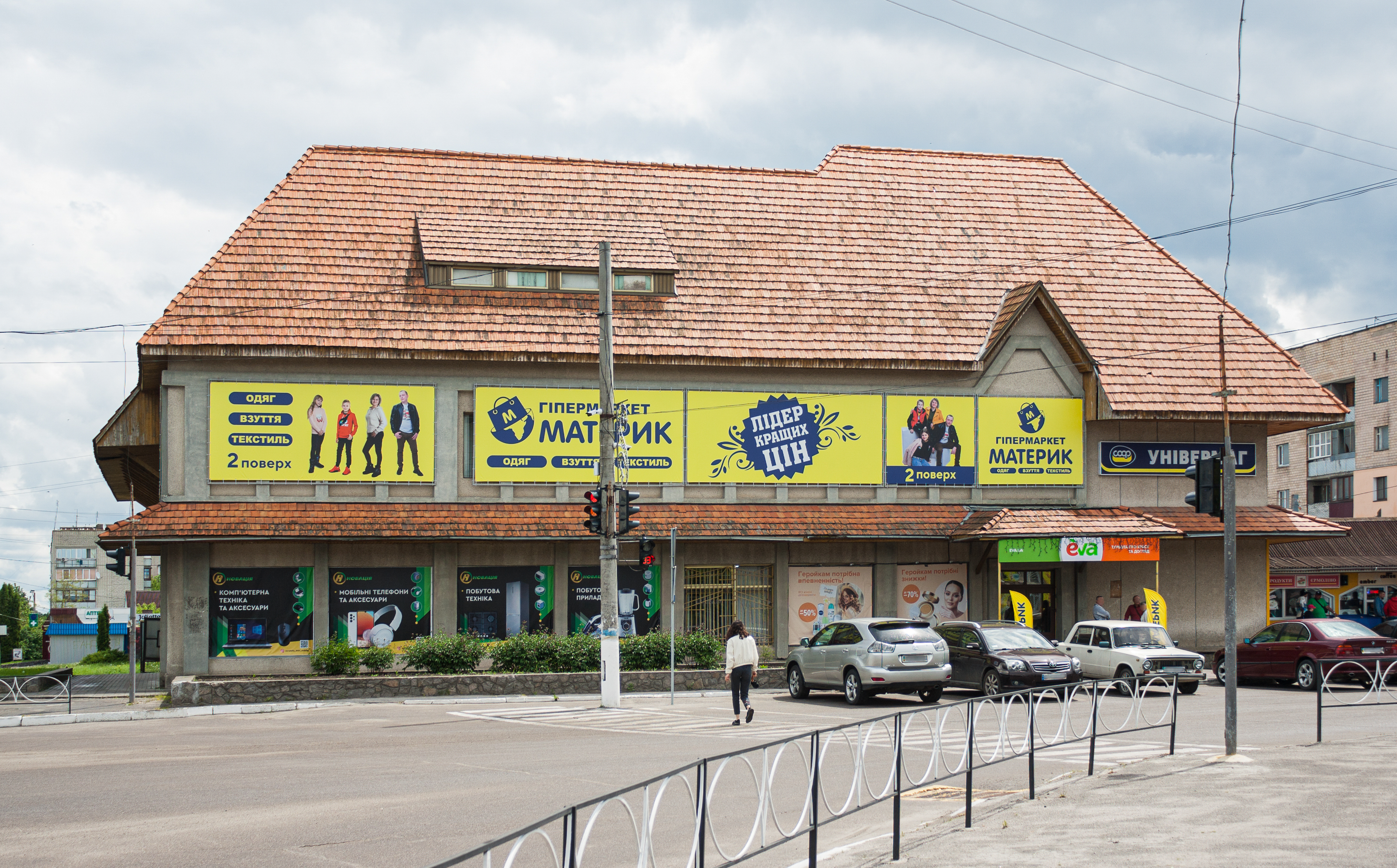
A department store in Zhashkiv

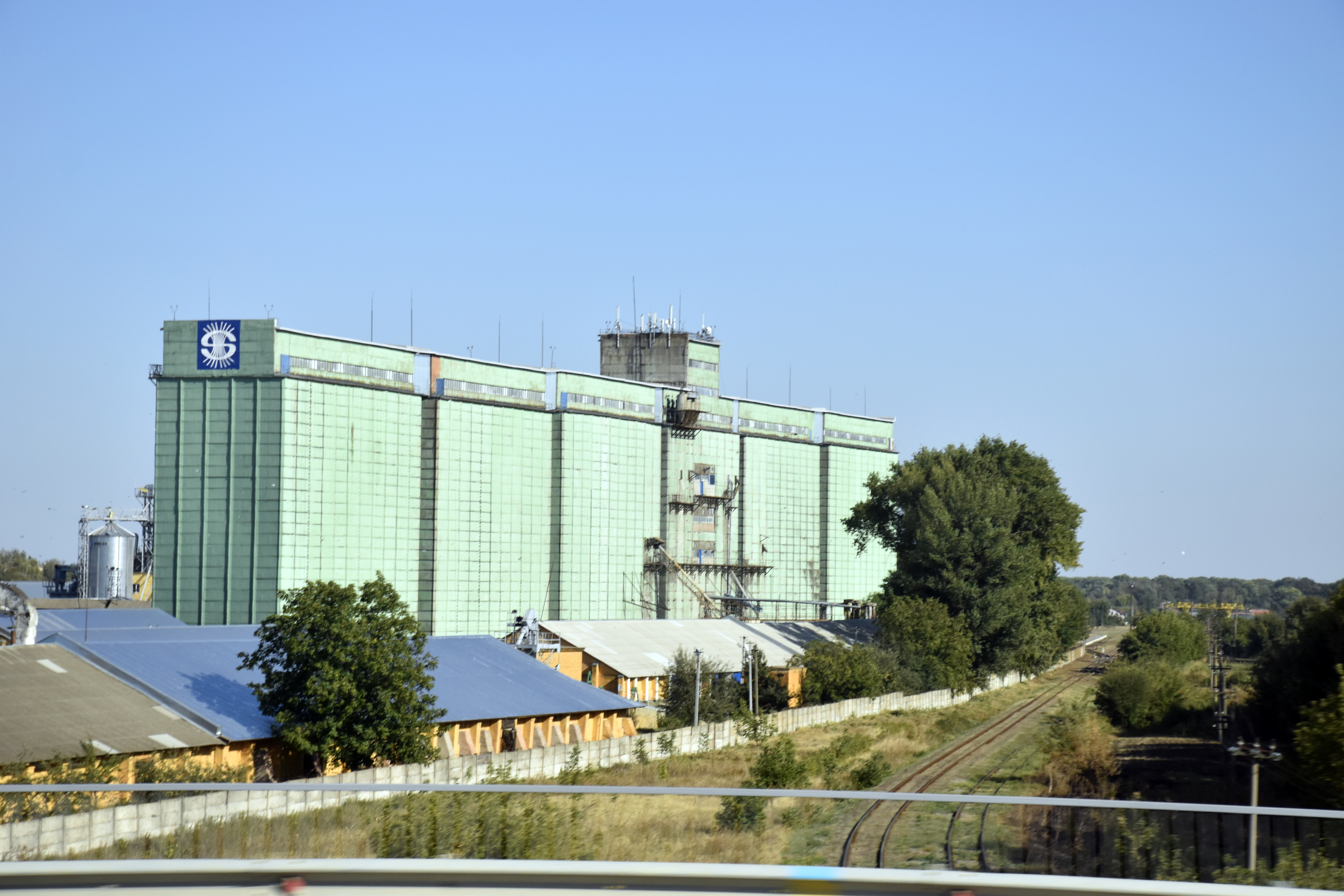
Zhashkiv grain elevator

== See also ==
- List of cities in Ukraine
