= Babanka =

Rural locality in Cherkasy Oblast, Ukraine

Babanka Бабанка
- Rural settlement
- Location of Babanka Babanka (Ukraine)
- Coordinates: 48°42′21″N 30°27′1″E
- Country: Ukraine
- Oblast: Cherkasy Oblast
- Raion: Uman Raion

Population (2022)
  - Total: 2,137
- Postal code: 20351
- Area code: +380 4744

Babanka (Ukrainian: Бабанка) is a rural settlement in Uman Raion, Cherkasy Oblast, Ukraine. It hosts the administration of Babanka settlement hromada, one of the hromadas of Ukraine. Population: 2,137 (2022 estimate).

Until 26 January 2024, Babanka was designated urban-type settlement. On this day, a new law entered into force which abolished this status, and Babanka became a rural settlement.
