= Babanka settlement hromada =

Babanka settlement hromada Бабанська селищна громада
- Hromada
- Interactive map of Babanka settlement hromada
- Country: Ukraine
- Oblast: Cherkasy
- Raion: Uman

Area
  - Total: 2,751 km^{2} (1,062 sq mi)

Population
  - Total: 6,566
  - Density: 2.387/km^{2} (6.182/sq mi)
- Website: babanska-gromada.gov.ua

Babanka settlement hromada is one of the hromadas of Ukraine located in the Uman Raion of Cherkasy Oblast. Its administrative centre is the rural settlement of Babanka.

== Localities ==
Rural settlements:

- Babanka (administrative centre)

Villages:

- Apolyanka
- Dubova, Uman Raion
- Korzhova
- Korzhova Sloboda
- Korzhovyi Kut
- Oksanyna
- Ostrivets
- Rohova
- Svynarka
- Vilshana-Slobidka
- Vilshanka, Babanka settlement hromada
