= Zhashkiv Raion =

Former subdivision of Cherkasy Oblast, Ukraine

Zhashkiv Raion Жашківський район
- Raion
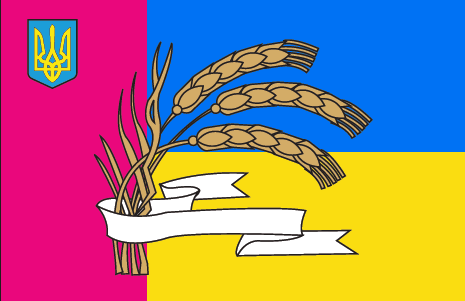
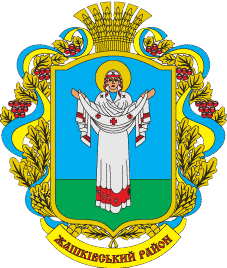
- Flag Coat of arms

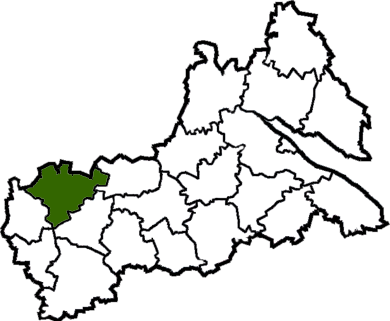
- Raion location in Cherkasy Oblast
- Coordinates: 49°10′36.6″N 30°9′20.2″E
- Country: Ukraine
- Oblast: Cherkasy Oblast
- Disestablished: 18 July 2020
- Admin. center: Zhashkiv

Population (2020)
  - Total: 35,145
- Time zone: UTC+2 (EET)
  - Summer (DST): UTC+3 (EEST)

Zhashkiv Raion (Ukrainian: Жашківський район) was a raion (district) of Cherkasy Oblast, central Ukraine. Its administrative centre was located at the town of Zhashkiv. The raion was abolished on 18 July 2020 as part of the administrative reform of Ukraine, which reduced the number of raions of Cherkasy Oblast to four. The area of Zhashkiv Raion was merged into Uman Raion. The last estimate of the raion population was 35,145 (2020 est.)

At the time of disestablishment, the raion consisted of three hromadas:

- Bashtechky rural hromada with the administration in the selo of Bashtechky;
- Sokolivka rural hromada with the administration in the selo of Sokolivka;
- Zhashkiv urban hromada with the administration in Zhashkiv.
