= Ladyzhynka =

Ladyzhynka Ладижинка
- Location in Cherkasy Oblast
- Coordinates: 48°32′32″N 30°14′17″E
- Country: Ukraine
- Oblast: Cherkasy Oblast
- Raion: Uman Raion
- Village founded: 1726
- Elevation: 197 m (646 ft)

Population (2009)
  - Total: 2,286
  - Density: 226/km^{2} (590/sq mi)
- Time zone: UTC+2 (EET)
  - Summer (DST): UTC+3 (EEST)
- Postal code: 20382
- Area code: +380 47 44

Ladyzhynka (Ukrainian: Ладижинка) is a village in Uman Raion of Cherkasy Oblast of Ukraine. It is located approximately 22 km from the raion's administrative center. It hosts the administration of Ladyzhynka rural hromada, one of the hromadas of Ukraine.

== Population ==
As of 2009, its population was 2,286.

=== Language ===
Distribution of the population by native language according to the 2001 census:

Language	Number	Percentage
Ukrainian	2 468	98.88%
Other^{[a]}	28	1.12%
Total	2 496	100.00%

^{a} Those who did not indicate their native language or indicated a language that was native to less than 1% of the local population.
