= Monastyryshche urban hromada =

Urban hromada of Cherkasy Oblast, Ukraine

Coordinates: 49°03′N 29°50′E

Monastyryshche urban hromada Монастирищенська міська громада
- Hromada
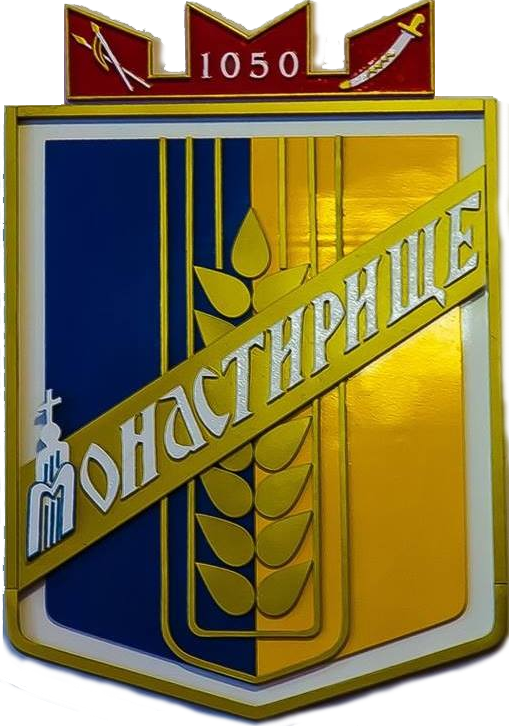
- Seal
- Interactive map of Monastyryshche urban hromada
- Country: Ukraine
- Oblast: Cherkasy
- Raion: Uman

Area
  - Total: 723.8 km^{2} (279.5 sq mi)

Population (01.01.2025)
  - Total: 32,996
  - Density: 45.59/km^{2} (118.1/sq mi)
- Settlements: 41
- Cities: 1
- Rural settlements: 6
- Villages: 34
- Website: monastyrysche-gromada.gov.ua

Monastyryshche urban territorial hromada (Ukrainian: Монастирищенська міська територіальна громада, romanized: Monastyryshchenska miska terytorialna hromada) is one of Ukraine's hromadas, located in Uman Raion within Cherkasy Oblast. Its capital is the city of Monastyryshche.

== Composition ==
The hromada contains 41 settlements: 1 city (Monastyryshche), 6 rural settlements (Kudyniv Lis, Pokrovka, Tsybuliv, Vilna, Volodymyrivka, Zabiliany), and 34 villages:

- Antonina
- Avramivka
- Bachkuryne
- Bubelnia
- Dibrivka
- Dolynka
- Ivakhny
- Khalaidove
- Kheilove
- Kniazha Krynytsia
- Kniazhyky
- Kopiiuvata
- Korytnia
- Leskove
- Letychivka
- Lukashivka
- Matviikha
- Nove Misto
- Novosilka
- Panskyi Mist
- Polovynchyk
- Popudnia
- Sarny
- Satanivka
- Shabastivka
- Sharnopil
- Stepivka
- Tarasivka
- Tarnava
- Teolyn
- Terlytsia
- Vladyslavchyk
- Zarubyntsi
- Ziubrykha
