= Stanisław Miedza-Tomaszewski =

Polish artist (1913–2000)

- Born: March 13, 1913
- Died: December 15, 2000 (aged 87)
- Resting place: Powązki Cemetery
- Education: Academy of Fine Arts in Warsaw
- Occupation: artist

Corporal Stanisław Władysław Miedza-Tomaszewski (March 13, 1913 – December 15, 2000), underground nom de guerre Miedza (footpath between fields in Polish), was a Polish war artist, and underground fighter.

Member of the Polish resistance during occupation of Poland in World War II. In cooperation with Józef Walaszczyk, he was helping Jews living in the Warsaw ghetto, bringing them food, medicines and documents. He escaped from the transport to Pawiak prison after arrest, and left besieged Warsaw with the civilian population. Miedza-Tomaszewski is the author of the 1977 memoir Benefis konspiratora about his Warsaw Uprising experiences. Those events served as the basis for the movie Umarłem, aby żyć (I died, so as to live, 1984).

Miedza-Tomaszewski graduated from the Academy of Fine Arts in Warsaw when the war broke out. In the Polish resistance, he was one of the members of the Bureau of Information and Propaganda. He designed posters and underground stamps. He was a brother of photographer Jerzy Tomaszewski (also a member of Polish Armia Krajowa) who photographed the Warsaw Uprising before being seriously wounded; and Andrzej Tomaszewski nom de guerre 'Andrzej', also an underground fighter. He was the oldest of six brothers.

Stanisław Miedza-Tomaszewski was the godfather of Polish president Lech Kaczyński.

== Honours ==
- Silver Cross of Merit
- Cross of Valour

== Bibliography ==
- Lubomir Mackiewicz, Anna Żołna (ed.), Kto jest kim w Polsce. Informator biograficzny, Volume 3, Warsaw 1993, s. 745 (see: Tomaszewski-Miedza)
- Mateusz Szczepaniak (2012-04-08), Niema manifestacja. Wielkanocne Groby Pańskie w kościele akademickim św. Anny w latach 1940-44 (in Polish), Nasza Stolica
- Elżbieta Berus (April 6–12, 2012), "Patriotyczne groby", 14 (251), Warsaw: Warszawska Gazeta, pp. 6–11, ISSN 1898-8075
