= Józef Walaszczyk =

Polish Righteous Among the Nations (1919–2022)

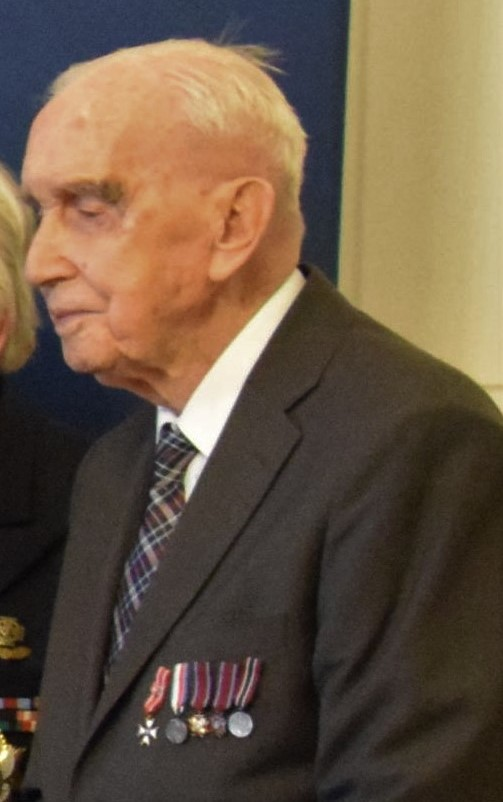
- Born: 13 November 1919; Częstochowa, Poland
- Died: 20 June 2022 (aged 102); Warsaw, Poland
- Occupations: Leatherworker, businessman

Józef Władysław Walaszczyk (13 November 1919 – 20 June 2022) was a Polish leatherworker and businessman who was declared Righteous Among the Nations in 2002 for sheltering Jews during the Holocaust. He has been described as a "second Schindler" or "Polish Schindler".

== Early life ==
Walaszczyk was born in Częstochowa into an affluent intelligentsia family. His mother was a feldsher and his father a journalist. In 1927, after his father died during a visit to the United States, the family's financial situation worsened. His mother decided to move from Warsaw to Rylsk where their cousin, Ludwik Okęcki, owned an estate and a potato flour factory. Walaszczyk continued his education in Częstochowa, Aleksandrów Kujawski, Łowicz, and Piotrków Trybunalski. Before outbreak of the war, he had passed the junior high school graduation examination and was studying at the senior high school of commerce in Warsaw. He lived in a studio apartment at 34 Krucza Street and worked in trade, achieving enough success to lead a comfortable lifestyle. At that time, he had some Jewish acquaintances. He spent his holidays in Rylsk, where Okęcki taught him to run the estate. In 1938, he joined the National Party but quickly left due to its antisemitism.

== Second World War ==
=== Rylsk ===
In June 1939, Walaszczyk participated in a military preparatory course near Lidzbark Warmiński. After Germans invaded Poland on 1 September 1939, he was mobilised and sent to Brześć, Eastern Poland. Following the Soviet Union attacked Poland on 17 September 1939, Walaszczyk and his cousin, who was also sent there, decided to return to Rylsk instead of going to the Romanian Bridgehead, their initial plan. Despite difficulties (Józef was arrested for a couple of days by Germans), they reached Rylsk at the end of September. In December 1939, thanks to his knowledge of German, Walaszczyk was appointed manager of the factory and administrator of the entire estate in Rylsk. He employed around 200 workers, including his family, friends, and others from the community (including Jews), providing them with food and accommodation. Probably in 1941, one of his friends from before 1939, Wengrow, asked him to employ forty Jews from the ghetto in Rawa Mazowiecka. Walaszczyk agreed as he owed him a favour. He obtained permission from Miller, head of the local Arbeitsamt (labour office), convincing him with a large bribe to take 30 Jews. Walaszczyk needed to provide another installment of the bribe every two weeks. The hired Jews had a sufficiently good situation to care for themselves, so Walaszczyk did not need to feed them. However, after about a year, Miller withdrew his permission. Walaszczyk advised his workers to hide if Germans appeared. When he was on his way to the Arbeitsamt, German officers arrived at the estate with trucks. A few Jews who had not hidden were arrested and transported to the ghetto in Łódź. The rest hid and survived.

=== Warsaw ===
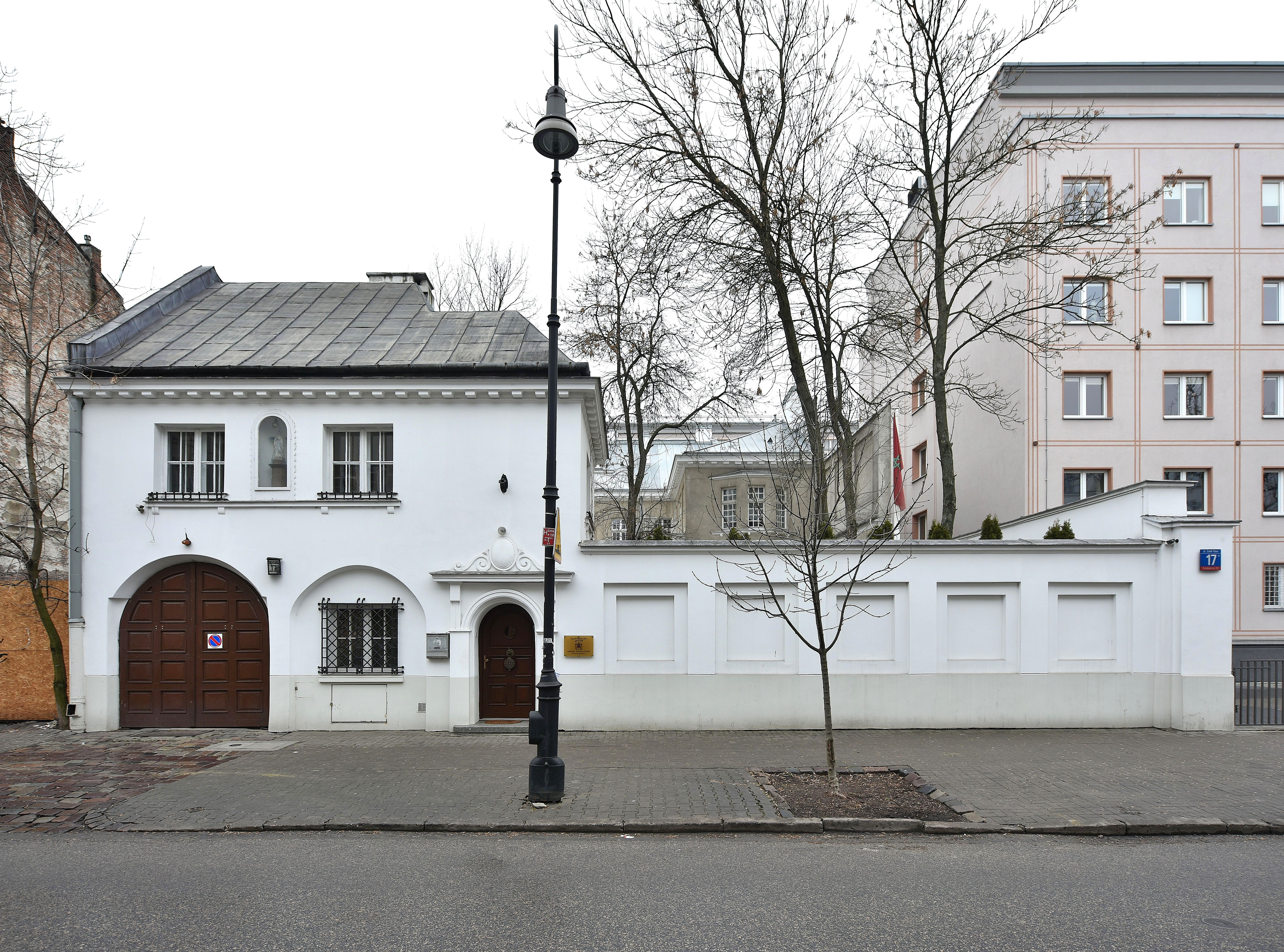
17 Emilii Plater St, current view

In 1940 or spring 1941, Walaszczyk fell in love with Irena Front (styling herself Bartczak). She did not tell him she was Jewish until the Gestapo burst into their Warsaw hotel room. Walaszczyk helped Front hide behind a wardrobe and pretended to have stomach problems in the bathroom outside the room. The Germans left, assured by the hotel owner that he was a frequent and well-known client. Following that incident, Front lived in Walaszczyk's flat on Krucza Street. They arranged a fake wedding so she could attempt to be put on the non-Jewish Volksliste. At the end of October 1941, Front was detained with a group of 20 Jewish acquaintances. Walaszczyk, informed about the situation, came to Warsaw. At the police station, where the Home Army had an agent, he was informed that all 21 Jews would be released if he brought the Germans a kilogram of gold (2.2 lb) within 5 hours. The Germans initially refused to release only Front. Walaszczyk managed to collect and pay the bribe, saving all 21 people. Despite the assurance from the Germans that Front could safely live at the flat on Krucza Street, he sold the apartment the following day as he felt it was no longer safe and bought another one at 17 Emilii Plater Street. Besides Front, two other Jews lived there – her friend Hanka Staszewska and nanny Helena Torbeczko. Despite his duties in Rylsk, Walaszczyk visited and supported the women. Over time, Staszewska was meeting with a young man, who turned out to be an agent for the Kriminalpolizei. He did not discover her Jewish identity.

Walaszczyk also cooperated with the Polish resistance movement (among others Stanisław Miedza-Tomaszewski) and helped his Jewish friends living in the Warsaw Ghetto, bringing them food, medicines, and documents. He frequently bribed a tram driver to slow down when passing the ghetto so he could jump off safely. During one of his visits in 1943, he contracted typhus and spent a couple of weeks recovering at the flat on Emilii Plater Street.

After the outbreak of the Warsaw Uprising in 1944, Walaszczyk arranged for Front, Staszewska, and Torbeczko to get out of the besieged city to the Red Cross camp in Podkowa Leśna and then on to Rylsk. Walaszczyk decided to leave Rylsk to avoid arrest by the Soviets for being a kulak. In January 1945, he and Front returned to Warsaw where they stayed until the end of the war. Their flat at Emilii Plater Street survived the destruction of Warsaw.

== Later life ==
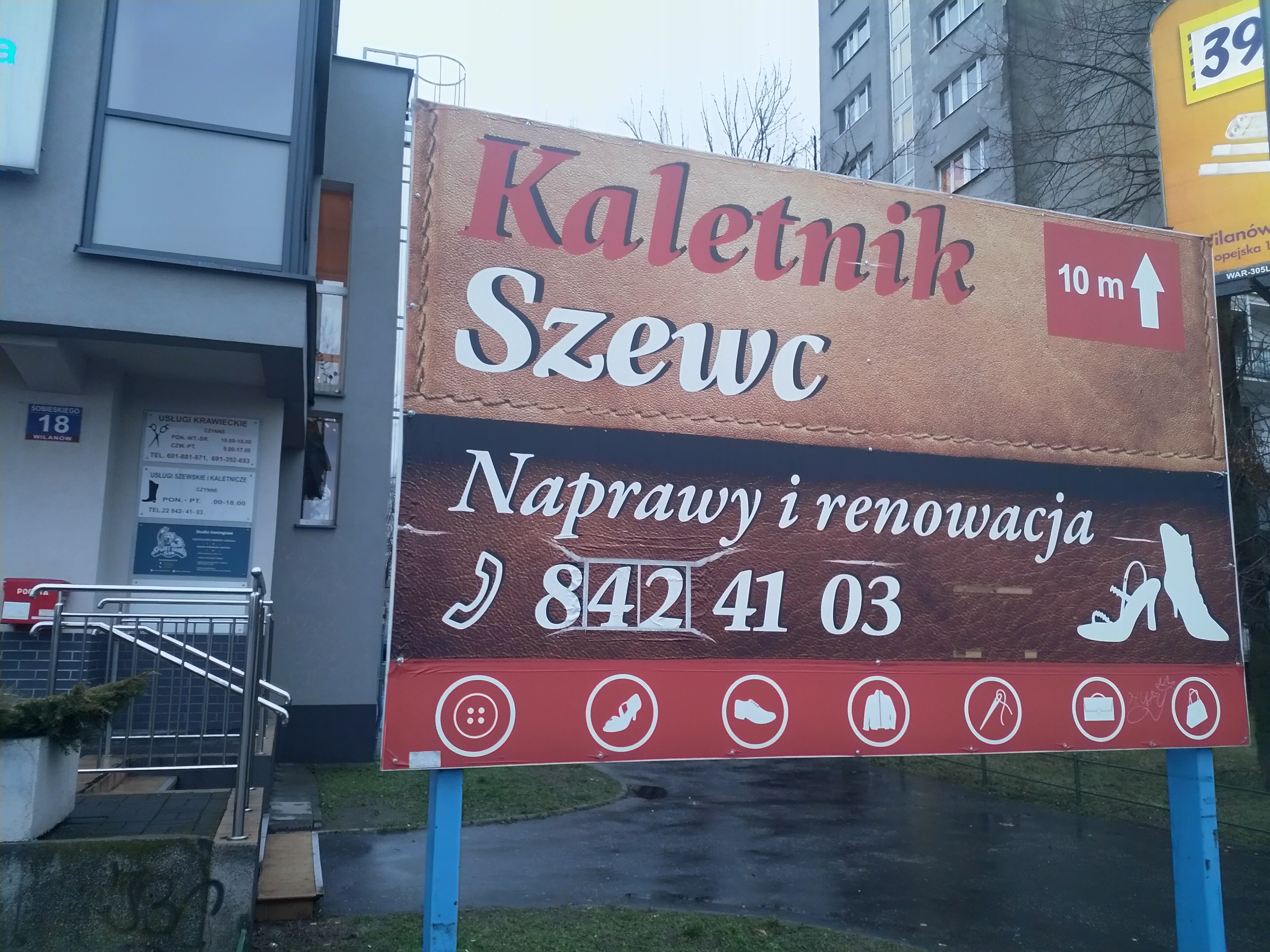
Plaque of the erstwhile Walaszczyk's workshop on Sobieskiego St, current view

Just after the war, Walaszczyk and Front moved to Kraków, where he established new businesses, including organising Kraków–Katowice passenger journeys. Though they broke up, they remained on good terms. Due to Walaszczyk's friendship with the French consul, the Security Service pressured him to leave Kraków. In cooperation with Okęcki, Walaszczyk launched a wool and cotton materials factory. In 1949, the enterprise was nationalised. Later, Walaszczyk and his Jewish colleagues ran a sewing room in Warsaw which was closed under pressure from the tax office. Walaszczyk's factory was closed after two years in 1952. He was also involved in cooperatives in Grodzisk Mazowiecki and then in Rembertów. He worked there for some time and was quite successful. In the meantime, he obtained permission to work as a master leatherworker, which allowed him to open his own workshop at 18 Jana III Sobieskiego Street in Warsaw. He continued to run it until he was very old.

Around 1950, Walaszczyk married Alicja Jastrzębska, whom he had met in Kraków. In 1951, she gave birth to their son Ryszard. Following his divorce from Jastrzębska in 1970, Walaszczyk married Barbara, with whom he had a son, Sławomir.

In 2002, on Front's recommendation, Walaszczyk was honoured by Yad Vashem with the title of Righteous Among the Nations. He was active in the Polish Association of the Righteous Among the Nations and served as its vice-president from August 2008. In 2009, he was among the representatives of Polish Righteous during a visit to the United States, which included meeting with President Barack Obama. In the same year, KARTA Center published his memoirPrzywracanie pamięci (Restoring Memory). In 2019, his 100th birthday was commemorated by President of Poland Andrzej Duda. Walaszczyk died on 20 June 2022 in Warsaw.

== Honours ==
- Righteous Among the Nations (2002)
- Commander of the Order of Polonia Restituta (2008)
- Bronze Cross of Merit
- Pro Patria Medal (2017)
- Pro Bono Poloniae Medal (2019)
- Medal of the Centenary of Regained Independence (2019)
