= Jerzy Tomaszewski (photographer) =

Polish photographer (1924–2016)

- Jerzy Tomaszewski (left) with President of Poland Lech Kaczyński (right) at his photo exhibit in Warsaw
- Born: c. 1924; Warsaw
- Died: 26 January 2016 (aged 91–92); Warsaw
- Occupations: Photographer, author
- Known for: Episodes of the Warsaw Uprising

Jerzy Tomaszewski (1924 – 26 January 2016), nom de guerre Jur, was a Polish World War II photographer, artist, and reporter, awarded the Order of Polonia Restituta by President Lech Kaczyński.

Tomaszewski is best known for the roughly 1,000 photographs of the Warsaw Uprising which he took in 1944. He was assigned by the Polish underground Bureau of Information and Propaganda (BIP) to document the battle. He photographed in the districts of Powiśle, Śródmieście and Wola, until he was wounded on 6 September 1944. The last photo he took was of the several bodies lying in the street of the Old Town, without signs of life.

== Life ==
Tomaszewski completed a clandestine course in photography in Warsaw in 1940 as a 16-year-old boy. He was transferred by the Armia Krajowa to Studio "Fotoris" in downtown Warsaw, which was a popular German photo-processing shop; a Polish underground cell was already there. Tomaszewski's job was to copy the German photographs on microfilm (including pictures of executions), and take them outside. The microfilms were smuggled to London where the Polish government-in-exile kept publishing the evidence of war crimes. In 1943 the Gestapo traced the evidence back to Studio "Fotoris". Tomaszewski escaped along with Mieczysław Kucharski. The studio manager, engineer Andrzej Honowski was ambushed and killed in the struggle with Gestapo. Tomaszewski went into hiding, but kept working at a clandestine lab on Chmielna Street until the Warsaw Uprising broke out. Here he obtained the now-iconic photograph of the mass murder of Jews in the village of Ivanhorod by the SS.

During the Uprising, Tomaszewski was one of several dozen Polish photographers following the battle. Under heavy fire, he used to extend his hand out with the camera and shoot without showing his head. Nevertheless, he was seriously wounded, and ended up at a prisoner camp in Pruszków. Tomaszewski returned to Warsaw in February 1945 thinking that his enormous archive had burned down. For years, he refused to take pictures until one day, the rolls of film he took were discovered hidden in a metal container by courier Wacława Zawadzka. About 600 frames were still in a very good shape. In 1977 a big exhibition of his photos were arranged for the first time in Warsaw. Two years later, Tomaszewski published his groundbreaking photo-anthology called Epizody Powstania Warszawskiego (Episodes from the Warsaw Uprising). He was awarded the Order of Polonia Restituta (Krzyż Oficerski Orderu Odrodzenia Polski) on 29 July 2007.

Jerzy Tomaszewski is the brother of artist Stanisław Miedza-Tomaszewski (also a member of the Polish resistance in World War II).

== Selected works ==
Photographs of the Warsaw Uprising by Tomaszewski

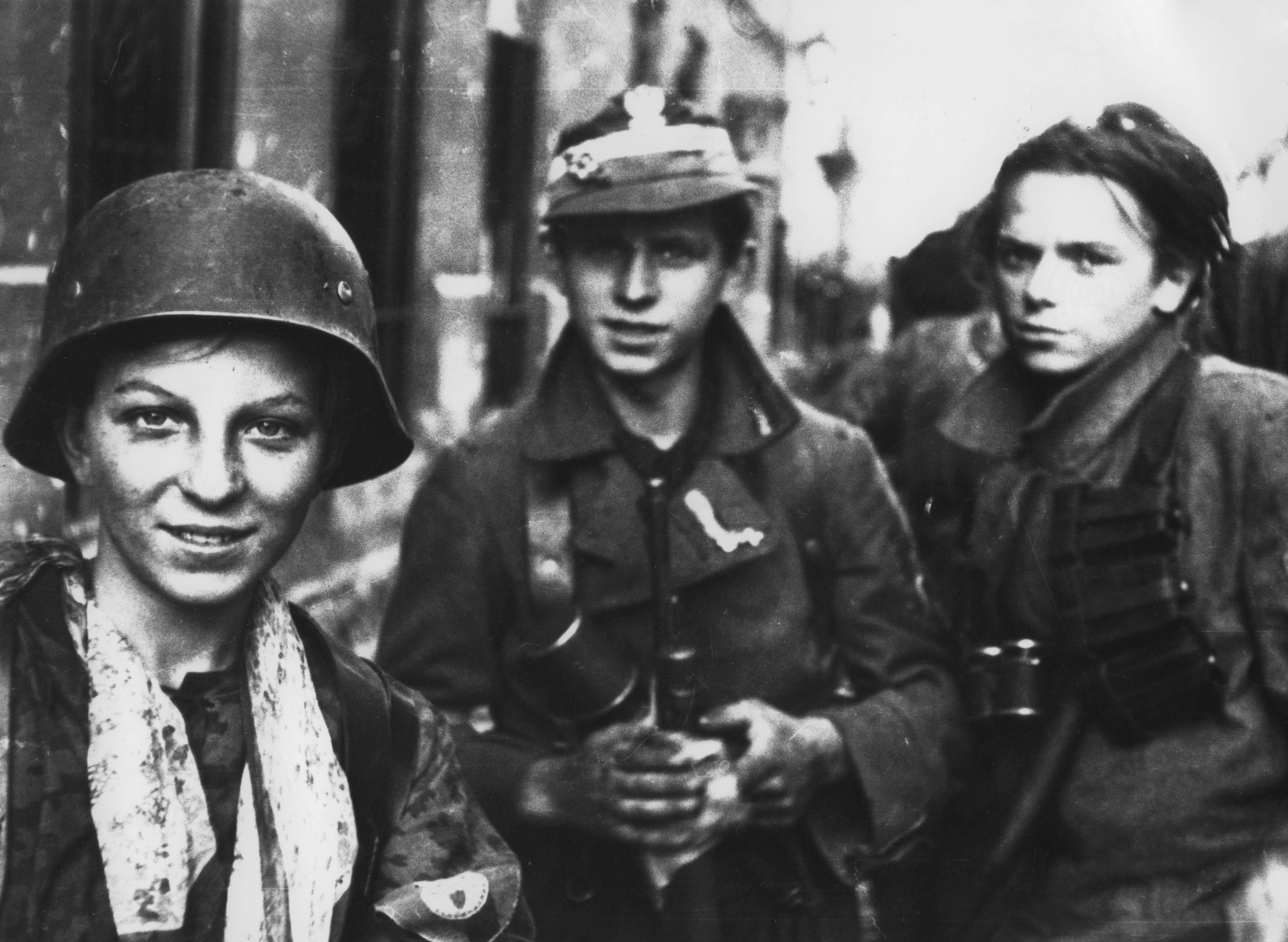
Szare Szeregi

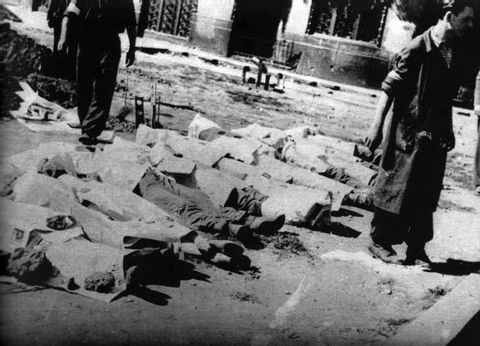
Jasna Street

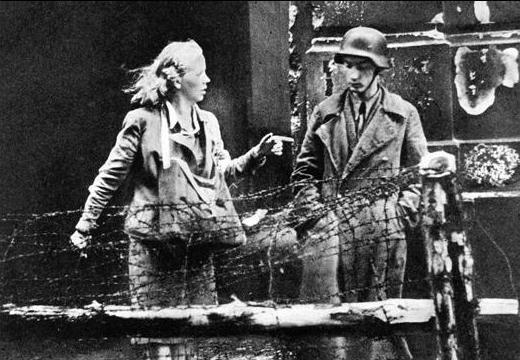
The new orders

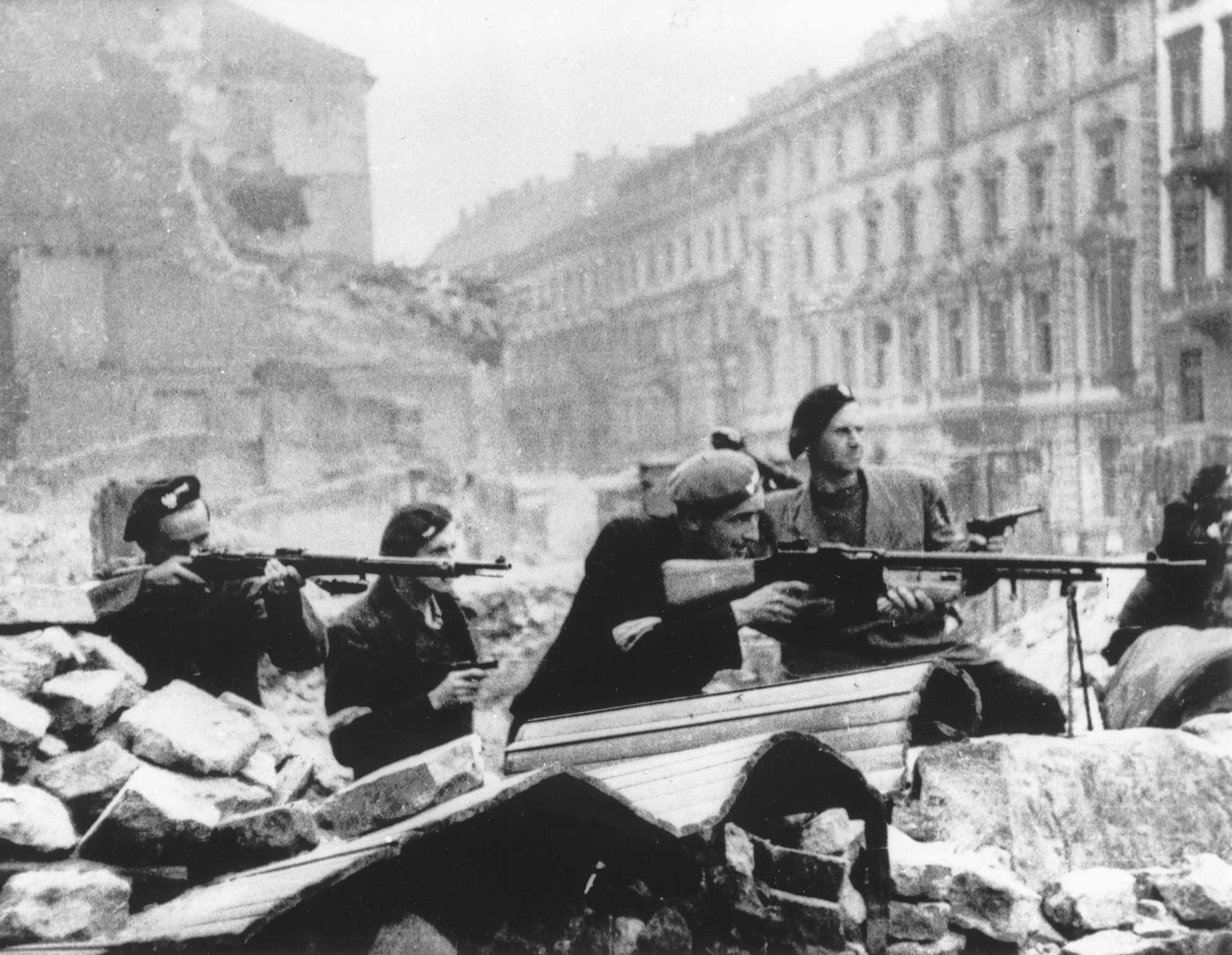
Mazowiecka Street

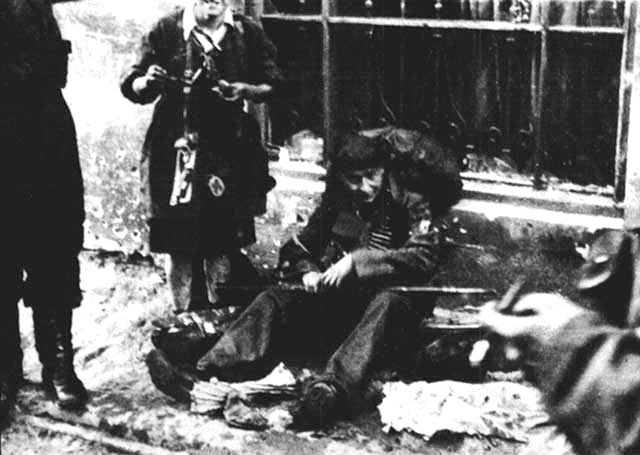
Warecka Street

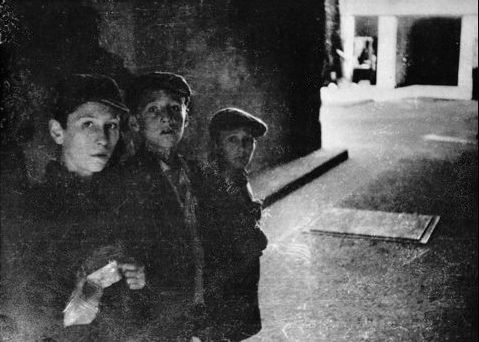
Children

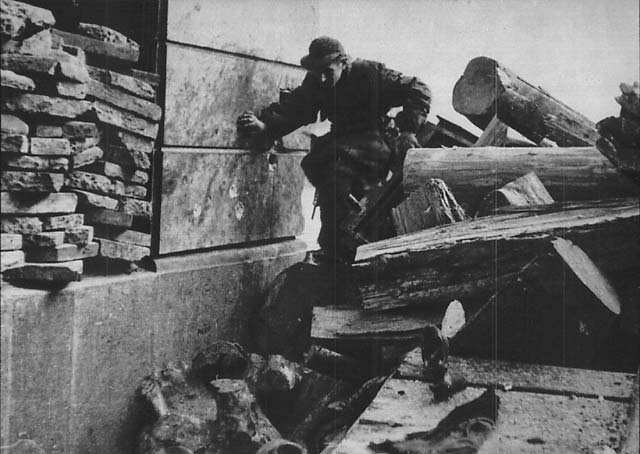
Warecka Street

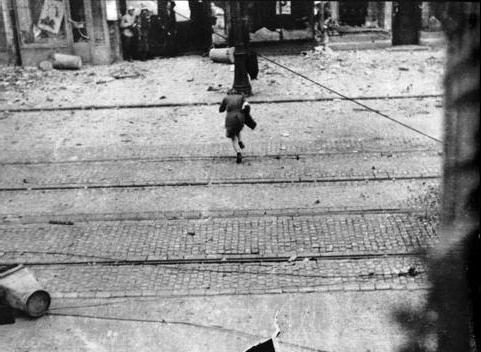
Courier crossing

== Notes and references ==
- Jerzy Tomaszewski: Epizody Powstania Warszawskiego (Episodes of the Warsaw Uprising). Warsaw: Krajowa Agencja Wydawnicza, 1979
