= Uman uezd =

Uman uezd Уманский уезд
- Uezd
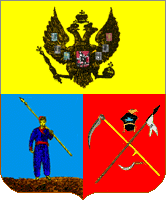
- Coat of arms

- Location in the Kiev Governorate
- Coordinates: 48°45′0″N 30°13′0″E
- Country: Russian Empire
- Krai: Southwestern
- Governorate: Kiev
- Established: 1797
- Abolished: 1923
- Capital: Uman

Area
  - Total: 4,295.27 km^{2} (1,658.41 sq mi)

Population (1897)
  - Total: 320,744
  - Density: 74.6738/km^{2} (193.404/sq mi)

The Uman uezd (Russian: Уманский уезд, romanized: Umanskiy uyezd; Ukrainian: Уманський повіт, romanized: Umans'kyi povit) was a subdivision (uezd) of the Kiev Governorate, Russian Empire. It was situated in the southern part of the governorate. Its administrative centre was Uman.

== Demographics ==
At the time of the Russian Empire Census of 1897, Umansky Uyezd had a population of 320,744. Of these, 85.4% spoke Ukrainian, 11.7% Yiddish, 1.8% Russian, 0.9% Polish and 0.1% German as their native language.

== See also ==
- Uman Raion
