= Adamivka, Zhytomyr Oblast =

Village in Ukraine

Coordinates: 50°22′37″N 27°54′55″E

Adamivka (Ukrainian: Адамівка Adamivka) is a village in northern Ukraine, in Zviahel Raion of Zhytomyr Oblast. The code KOATUUI: 1820655401. Its population is 15 people as 2001. Its postal index is 12724. Its calling code is 4144.

== Village council ==
The village council is located at 12734, Ukraine, Zhytomyr Oblast, Baranivskiy district, town Dovbysh (urban-type settlement), st. Shchosa, 20.
