= Monastyryshche Raion =

Former subdivision of Cherkasy Oblast, Ukraine

Monastyryshche Raion Монастирищенський район
- Raion
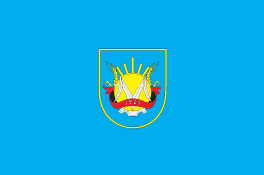
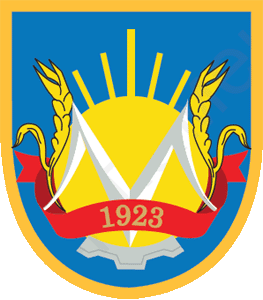
- Flag Coat of arms

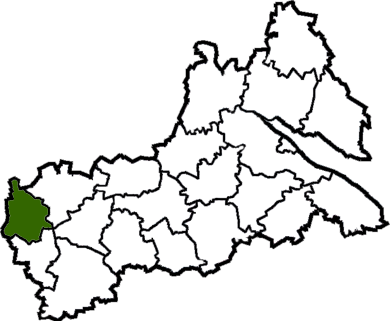
- Raion location in Cherkasy Oblast
- Coordinates: 49°1′56.3″N 29°50′4.6″E
- Country: Ukraine
- Oblast: Cherkasy Oblast
- Disestablished: 18 July 2020
- Admin. center: Monastyryshche

Area
  - Total: 719 km^{2} (278 sq mi)

Population (2020)
  - Total: 34,817
  - Density: 48.4/km^{2} (125/sq mi)
- Time zone: UTC+2 (EET)
  - Summer (DST): UTC+3 (EEST)

Monastyryshche Raion (Ukrainian: Монастирищенський район was a raion (district) of Cherkasy Oblast, central Ukraine. Its administrative centre was located at the town of Monastyryshche. The raion was abolished on 18 July 2020 as part of the administrative reform of Ukraine, which reduced the number of raions of Cherkasy Oblast to four. The area of Monastyryshche Raion was merged into Uman Raion. The last estimate of the raion population was 34,817 (2020 est.)

At the time of disestablishment, the raion consisted of one hromada, Monastyryshche urban hromada with the administration in Monastyryshche.
