= Khrystynivka Raion =

Former subdivision of Cherkasy Oblast, Ukraine

Khrystynivka Raion Христинівський район
- Raion
- Flag Coat of arms

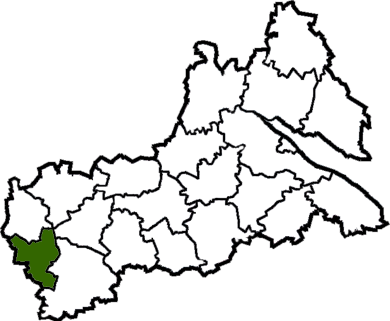
- Raion location in Cherkasy Oblast
- Coordinates: 49°48′25.2″N 29°57′12.9″E
- Country: Ukraine
- Oblast: Cherkasy Oblast
- Disestablished: 18 July 2020
- Admin. center: Khrystynivka

Population (2020)
  - Total: 33,479
- Time zone: UTC+2 (EET)
  - Summer (DST): UTC+3 (EEST)

Khrystynivka Raion (Ukrainian: Христинівський район) was a raion (district) of Cherkasy Oblast, central Ukraine. Its administrative centre was located at the town of Khrystynivka. The raion was abolished on 18 July 2020 as part of the administrative reform of Ukraine, which reduced the number of raions of Cherkasy Oblast to four. The area of Khrystynivka Raion was merged to Uman Raion. The last estimate of the raion population was 33,479 (2020 est.)

At the time of disestablishment, the raion consisted of one hromada, Khrystynivka urban hromada with the administration in Khrystynivka.
