= Zhashkiv urban hromada =

Urban hromada of Cherkasy Oblast, Ukraine

Zhashkiv urban hromada Жашківська міська громада
- Hromada
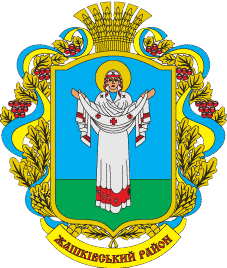
- Seal
- Interactive map of Zhashkiv urban hromada
- Coordinates: 49.25°N 30.1°E
- Country: Ukraine
- Oblast: Cherkasy
- Raion: Uman
- Settlements: 28
- Cities: 1
- Rural settlements: 1
- Villages: 26
- Website: zhashkivska-gromada.gov.ua

Zhashkiv urban territorial hromada (Ukrainian: Жашківська міська територіальна громада, romanized: Zhashkivska miska terytorialna hromada) is one of Ukraine's hromadas, located in Uman Raion within Cherkasy Oblast. Its capital is the city of Zhashkiv.

== Composition ==
The hromada contains 28 settlements: 1 city (Zhashkiv), 1 rural settlement (Adamivka), and 26 villages:

- Bezpechna
- Buzivka
- Khyzhnia
- Konela
- Konelska Popivka
- Konelski Khutory
- Kryvchunka
- Lemishchykha
- Lytvynivka
- Mariika
- Meduvata
- Odai
- Oleksandrivka
- Ostrozhany
- Puhachivka
- Sabadash
- Shuliaky
- Skybyn
- Sokolivka
- Sorokotiaha
- Teterivka
- Tykhyi Khutir
- Vilshanka
- Vorone
- Zelenyi Rih
- Zhytnyky
