= Khrystynivka urban hromada =

Urban hromada of Cherkasy Oblast, Ukraine

Coordinates: 48°49′00″N 29°56′30″E

Khrystynivka urban hromada Христинівська міська громада
- Hromada
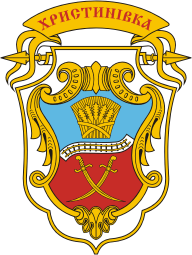
- Seal
- Interactive map of Khrystynivka urban hromada
- Country: Ukraine
- Oblast: Cherkasy
- Raion: Uman
- Settlements: 34
- Cities: 1
- Rural settlements: 5
- Villages: 28
- Website: khrystynivka-myskrada.gov.ua

Khrystynivka urban territorial hromada (Ukrainian: Христинівська міська територіальна громада, romanized: Khrystynivska miska terytorialna hromada) is one of Ukraine's hromadas, located in Uman Raion within Cherkasy Oblast. Its capital is the city of Khrystynivka.

== Composition ==
The hromada contains 34 settlements: 1 city (Khrystynivka), 5 rural settlements (Ivanivka, Khasanivka, Sychi, Verkhniachka, Yary), and 28 villages:

- Bahachivka
- Botvynivka
- Chaikivka
- Hreblia
- Ivanhorod
- Khrystynivka
- Kozache
- Kuzmyna Hreblia
- Lishchynivka
- Mala Ivanivka
- Mala Sevastianivka
- Oradivka
- Ositna
- Penizhkove
- Rozsishky
- Shelpakhivka
- Shukaivoda
- Sychivka
- Talalaivka
- Uhluvatka
- Velyka Sevastianivka
- Verbuvata
- Veselivka
- Viktorivka
- Vilshanka
- Yahubets
- Zaiachkivka
- Zoriane
