= Battle of Okhmativ (1644) =

1644 battle between the Polish-Lithuanian Commonwealth and a horde of Crimean Tatars

Battle of Okhmativ (Ochmatów)
- Part of Tatar raids on the Commonwealth
Date	30 January 1644
Location	Okhmativ, (modern-day Cherkasy Oblast, Ukraine)
Result	Polish–Lithuanian victory

Belligerents
Polish–Lithuanian Commonwealth	Crimean Khanate

Commanders and leaders
Stanisław Koniecpolski; Jeremi Wiśniowiecki	Tugay Bey

Strength
19,130	Under 20,000

Casualties and losses
Unknown	4,000

The Battle of Okhmativ or Battle of Ochmatów (Polish: Ochmatów) of 30 January 1644 refers to the engagement between the Polish forces under hetman Stanisław Koniecpolski and the horde of Crimean Tatars under Tugay Bey. Koniecpolski dealt a crushing defeat to Tugay Bey's forces near Okhmativ. This was the greatest Polish victory over the Tatars in the first half of the 17th century, and brought international fame and recognition to Koniecpolski.

== Background ==
After several years of relative quiet, the Crimean Tatars, united after a civil war, began raiding the Polish border in strength in the early 1640s. Provoked by a Cossack raid, a large Tatar raiding force began assembling in late 1643 near Ochakiv. In response, Polish military commander, Grand Crown Hetman, Stanisław Koniecpolski, ordered his forces to concentrate near Vinnytsia for 27 December. With the Tatars evading scouts, he split his forces around the possible incursion points. In early January Koniecpolski became aware of the horde movement.

== Opposing forces ==
Estimates of the Tatar army, commanded by Tugay Bey, supported by Murtaza aga, Ahmed murza, Temir aga and Omer aga, are between 10,000 and 20,000; Leszek Podhorodecki notes that the 20,000 to 40,000 estimates are exaggerated.

Koniecposki had an army of some 19,130 soldiers (60% of them, magnates' private armies; Koniecpolski's own forces numbered 2,200), divided into two main groups; one under his own command, and the other, under Jeremi Wiśniowiecki. According to Frost, Jeremi had a permanent force of 1,500-3,000, and could quickly raise 2,000 more, 6,000 in an emergency; of the 19,130 troops present at the battle, there were 3,500 regulars, 4,000 Registered Cossacks and 11,530 private troops. Other notable Polish participants in the battle included Marcin Kalinowski, Samuel Korecki, Stefan Czarniecki, Stanisław Potocki, Jan Zamoyski, and Krzysztof Grodzicki.

== Battle ==
Koniecpolski's intelligence on the enemy was better, and Tugay Bey mistakenly believed he had a much larger numerical advantage than he really had. At first, he had only his own corps of about 10,000, that began the fighting defensively. The battle was slowed down by heavy mists, during which Wiśniowiecki arrived, giving the Poles a numerical parity, if not superiority. After the Polish attack, Tugay Bey ordered a retreat, which turned into a rout. The pursuit continued for a day, and many Tatars drowned near Sina Woda when the ice gave way. The Tatars lost over 4,000 people, mostly during the retreat; the Polish casualties were "minimal".

== Aftermath ==
The battle was the Commonwealth's greatest victory over the Tatars in the first half of the 17th century, and it brought international fame to Koniecpolski, who had not only predicted the time and place of the Tatar attack but had destroyed their forces before they could deploy their usual tactic of splitting their main forces into multiple highly-mobile units (czambuls).

The victory led King Władysław IV to consider an offensive war against the Tatars. Koniecpolski supported a limited war against the Crimean Khanate but opposed the King's plan to wage war on the entire Ottoman Empire as an unrealistic folly. He set out his strategic views in a plan titled "Dyskurs o zniesieniu Tatarow krymskich" (Discourse on Destruction of the Crimean Tartars). Koniecpolski also strongly urged a coalition with Moscow for such a campaign. King Władysław IV continued to push for a crusade against Turkey, but it had little internal support and failed to achieve anything except to spread false hopes among the Cossacks, to whom he promised privileges and money in exchange for their participation in his crusade.
