= Bashtechky rural hromada =

Bashtechky rural hromada Баштечківська сільська громада
- Hromada
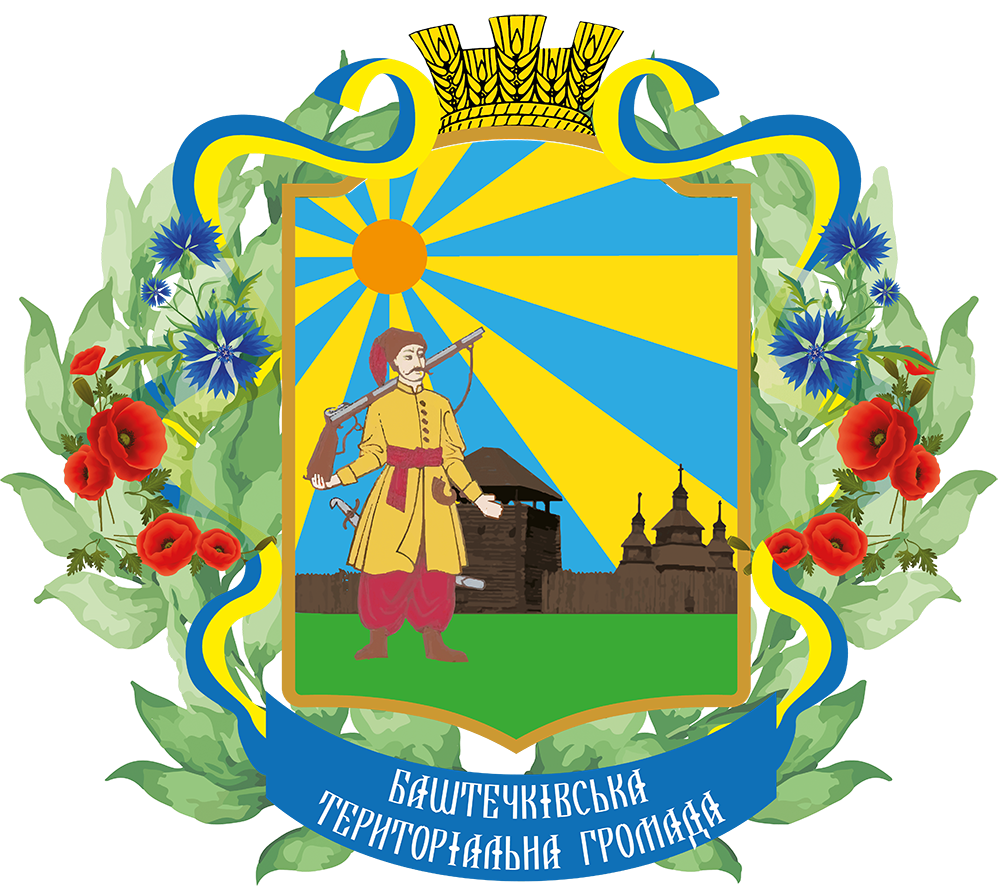
- Seal
- Interactive map of Bashtechky rural hromada
- Country: Ukraine
- Oblast: Cherkasy
- Raion: Uman

Area
  - Total: 1,794 km^{2} (693 sq mi)

Population
  - Total: 4,026
  - Density: 2.244/km^{2} (5.812/sq mi)
- Website: bashtechki.gr.org.ua

Bashtechky rural hromada (Ukrainian: Баштечківська сільська громада) is a hromada in the Uman Raion of Cherkasy Oblast in Ukraine. Its administrative seat is the village of Bashtechky.

== Localities ==
Villages:

- Bashtechky (administrative centre)
- Korolivka, Uman Raion
- Kostiantynivka, Uman Raion
- Nahirna, Uman Raion
- Okhmativ
- Pavlivka, Uman Raion
- Pobiina
- Tynivka
