= Khrystynivka =

Town in Cherkasy Oblast, Ukraine

Khrystynivka Христинівка
- City
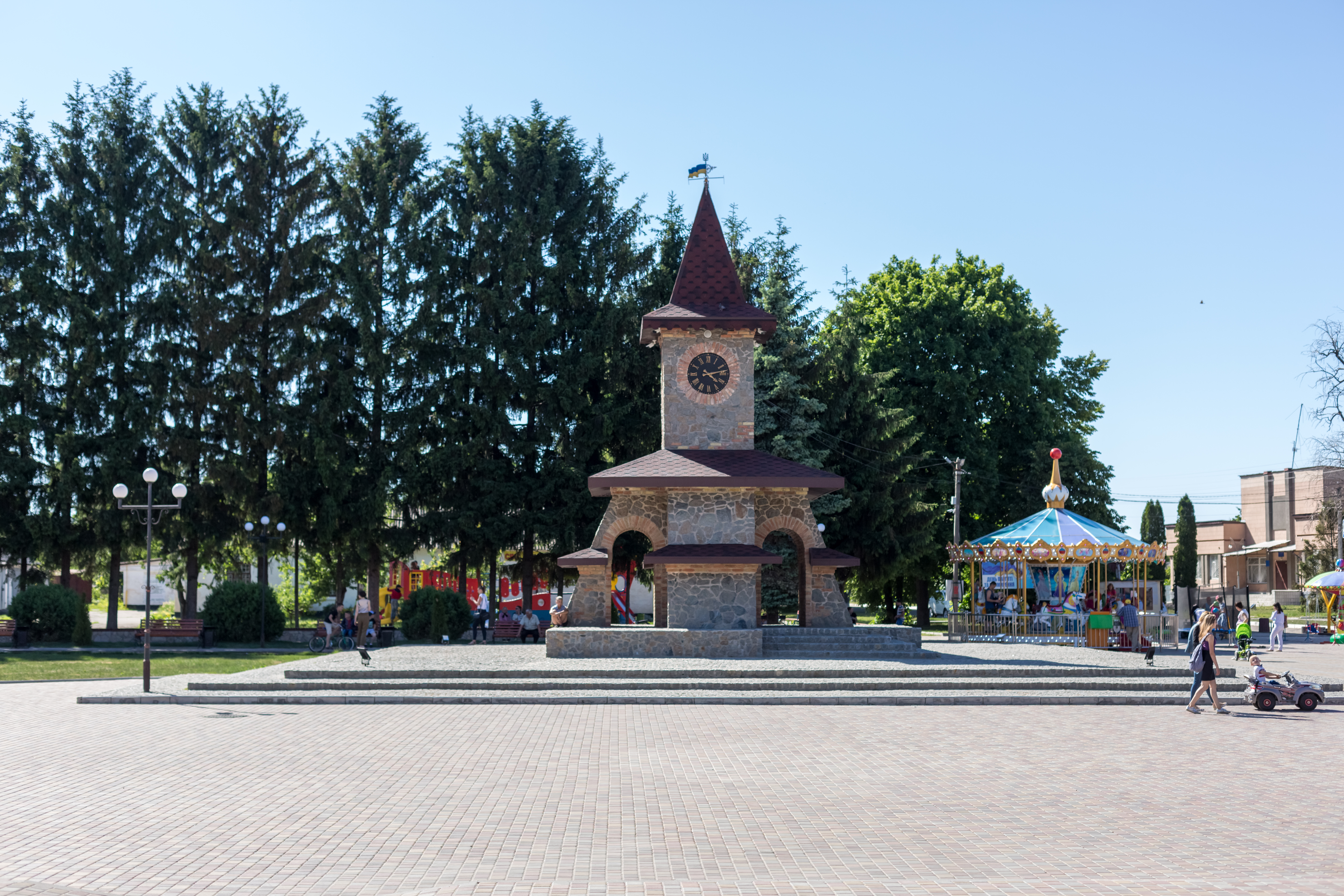
- City centre

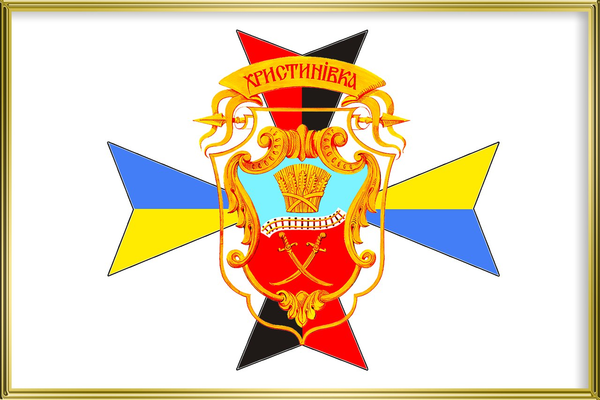
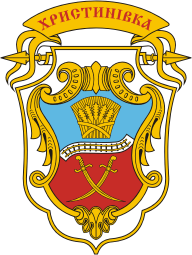
- Flag Coat of arms

- Location within Ukraine Location within Cherkasy Oblast
- Coordinates: 48°48′N 29°58′E
- Country: Ukraine
- Oblast: Cherkasy Oblast
- Raion: Uman Raion
- Hromada: Khrystynivka urban hromada
- Founded: 1890
- City status: 1956

Government
  - Mayor: Mykola Nakonechny

Area
  - Total: 13 km^{2} (5.0 sq mi)
- Elevation: 238 m (781 ft)

Population (2022)
  - Total: 9,879
  - Density: 760/km^{2} (2,000/sq mi)
- Postal code: 20000-20008
- Area code: +380-4745
- Website: https://archive.today/20140802060854/http://khryst-rada.gov.ua/

Khrystynivka (Ukrainian: Христинівка, IPA: [xrɪsˈtɪn⁽ʲ⁾iu̯kɐ]) is a city in Uman Raion, Cherkasy Oblast, Ukraine. It hosts the administration of Khrystynivka urban hromada, one of the hromadas of Ukraine. Population: 9,879 (2022 estimate).

== Administrative status ==
Until 18 July 2020, Khrystynivka served as an administrative center of Khrystynivka Raion. The raion was abolished in July 2020 as part of the administrative reform of Ukraine, which reduced the number of raions of Cherkasy Oblast to four. The area of Khrystynivka Raion was merged into Uman Raion.

== Population ==
According to the 2001 Ukrainian census, the city's population was 11,650. Ukrainians accounted for 94.9% of the population and Russians for 3.5%.

=== Language ===
Distribution of the population by native language according to the 2001 census:

Language	Number	Percentage
Ukrainian	11 021	95.60%
Russian	402	3.49%
Other^{[a]}	105	0.91%
Total	11 528	100.00%

^{a} Those who did not indicate their native language or indicated a language that was native to less than 1% of the local population.

== See also ==
- List of cities in Ukraine
