= Monastyryshche =

Town in Cherkasy Oblast, Ukraine

Monastyryshche Монастирище
- City
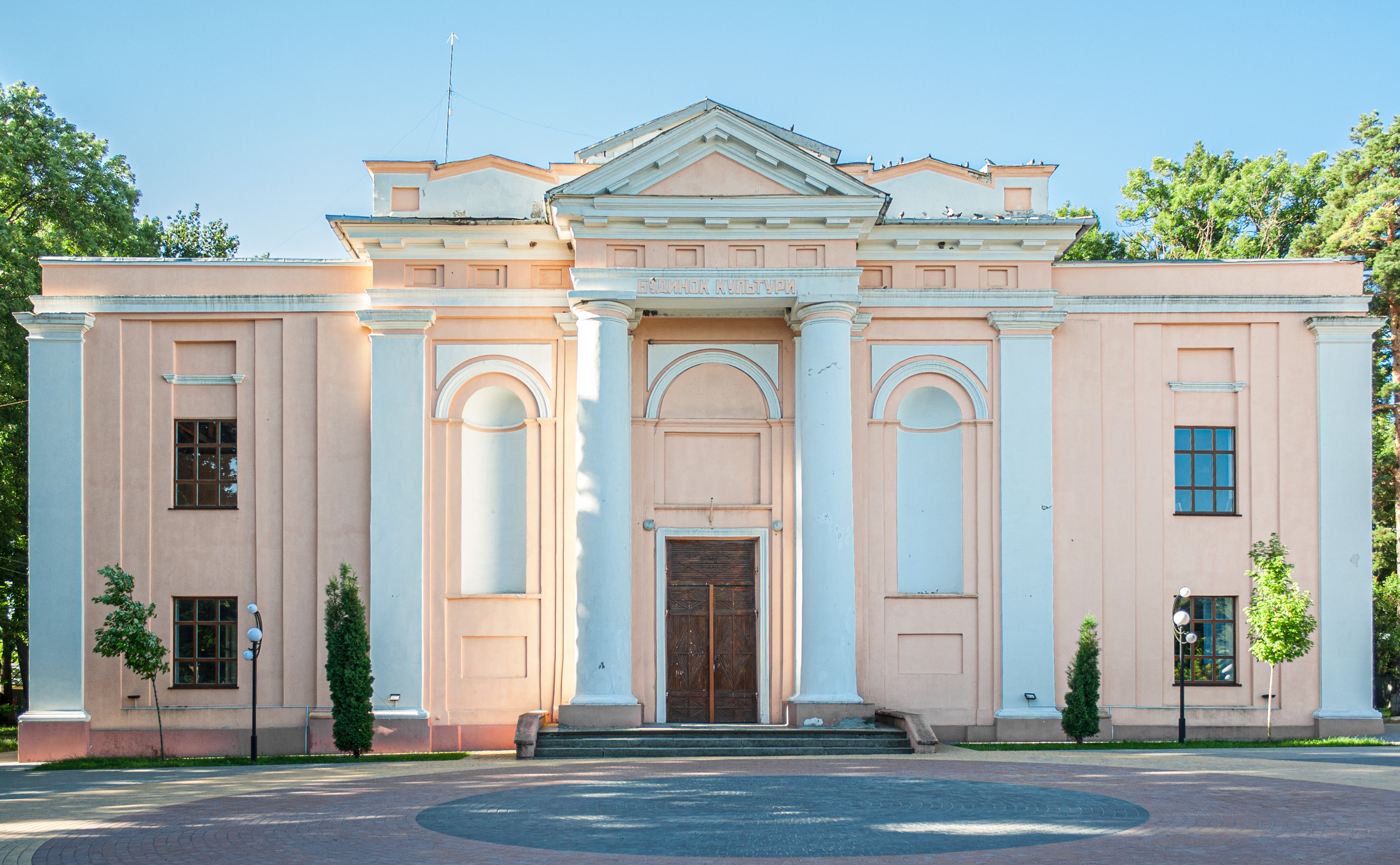
- House of Culture (former catholic church)

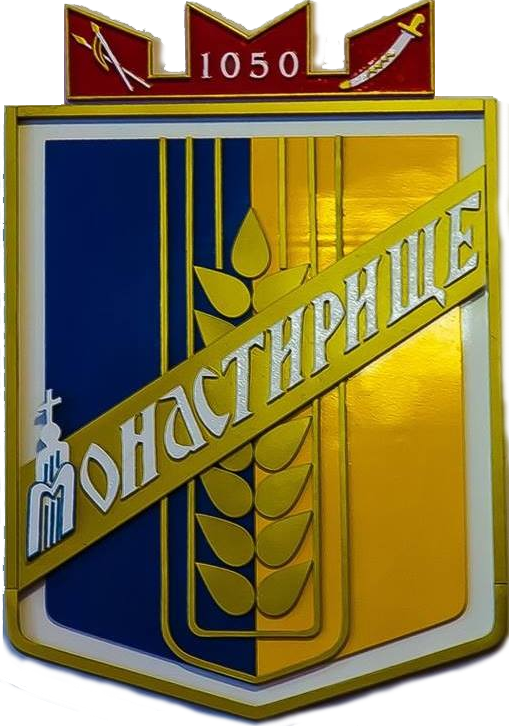
- Coat of arms

- Location of Korsun-Shevchenkivskyi Monastyryshche (Ukraine)
- Coordinates: 48°59′24″N 29°48′04″E
- Country: Ukraine
- Oblast: Cherkasy Oblast
- Raion: Uman Raion
- Hromada: Monastyryshche urban hromada
- First mentioned: 1622
- City status: 1985

Government
  - Mayor: Oleksandr Tyshchenko

Area
  - Total: 551 km^{2} (213 sq mi)
- Elevation: 242 m (794 ft)

Population
  - Total: 8,647
  - Density: 163/km^{2} (420/sq mi)
- Postal code: 19100 — 19109
- Area code: +380-4746
- Website: https://web.archive.org/web/20120618172340/http://mon.ck.ua/

Monastyryshche (Ukrainian: Монастирище, Ukrainian pronunciation: [monɐstɪˈrɪʃtʃe]) is a city in Uman Raion, Cherkasy Oblast, Ukraine. It hosts the administration of Monastyryshche urban hromada, one of the hromadas of Ukraine. Population: 8,338 (2022 estimate).

Until 18 July 2020, Monastyryshche served as an administrative center of Monastyryshche Raion. The raion was abolished in July 2020 as part of the administrative reform of Ukraine, which reduced the number of raions of Cherkasy Oblast to four. The area of Monastyryshche Raion was merged into Uman Raion.

== Hassidic Dynasty ==
Rabbi Mordechai Rosen was head dean, and grand rabbi of the village of Monistrich, known as Monastyrysche in Ukrainian. He perished during the Holocaust in World War II and was survived by his sons R. Nachman and R. Froim.

The biography of this rabbi can be found in many Hebrew religious books, among them "Ner Nachman".
