= Uman Raion =

Subdivision of Cherkasy Oblast, Ukraine

Uman Raion Уманський район
- Raion
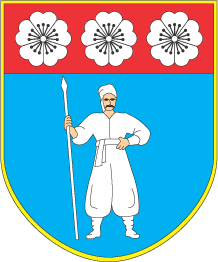
- Flag Coat of arms

- Coordinates: 48°40′37″N 30°16′11.3″E
- Country: Ukraine
- Oblast: Cherkasy Oblast
- Admin. center: Uman
- Subdivisions: 12 hromadas

Government
  - Governor: Ihor Myklashchuk

Area
  - Total: 1,394.7 km^{2} (538.5 sq mi)

Population (2022)
  - Total: 247,847
  - Density: 177.71/km^{2} (460.26/sq mi)
- Time zone: UTC+02:00 (EET)
  - Summer (DST): UTC+03:00 (EEST)
- Postal index: 083
- Area code: 380-4744
- Website: Verkhovna Rada website

Uman Raion (Ukrainian: Уманський район, romanized: Umans'kyi raion) is a raion (district) in the west of Cherkasy Oblast (province) of central Ukraine. Its administrative center is the city of Uman. Population: 247,847 (2022 estimate).

On 18 July 2020, as part of the administrative reform of Ukraine, the number of raions of Cherkasy Oblast was reduced to four, and the area of Uman Raion was significantly expanded. Four abolished raions, Khrystynivka, Mankivka, Monastyryshche, and Zhashkiv Raions, as well as the city of Uman, which was previously incorporated as a city of oblast significance and did not belong to the raion, were merged into Uman Raion. The January 2020 estimate of the raion population was 41,994 (2020 est.).

== Subdivisions ==
=== Current ===
After the reform in July 2020, the raion consisted of 13 hromadas:

- Babanka settlement hromada with the administration in the rural settlement of Babanka, retained from Uman Raion;
- Bashtechky rural hromada with the administration in the selo of Bashtechky, transferred from Zhashkiv Raion;
- Buky settlement hromada with the administration in the rural settlement of Buky, transferred from Mankivka Raion;
- Dmytrushky rural hromada with the administration in the selo of Dmytrushky, retained from Uman Raion;
- Ivanky rural hromada with the administration in the selo of Ivanky, transferred from Mankivka Raion;
- Khrystynivka urban hromada with the administration in the city of Khrystynivka, transferred from Khrystynivka Raion;
- Ladyzhynka rural hromada with the administration in the selo of Ladyzhynka, retained from Uman Raion;
- Mankivka settlement hromada with the administration in the rural settlement of Mankivka, transferred from Mankivka Raion;
- Monastyryshche urban hromada with the administration in the city of Monastyryshche, transferred from Monastyryshche Raion;
- Palanka rural hromada with the administration in the selo of Palanka, retained from Uman Raion;
- Sokolivka rural hromada with the administration in the selo of Sokolivka, transferred from Zhashkiv Raion;
- Uman urban hromada with the administration in the city of Uman, was previously a city of oblast significance;
- Zhashkiv urban hromada with the administration in the city of Zhashkiv, transferred from Zhashkiv Raion.

On 12 August 2020, Sokolivka rural hromada was abolished and merged into Zhashkiv urban hromada, thus reducing the number of amalgamated hromadas in Uman Raion to 12.

=== Before 2020 ===
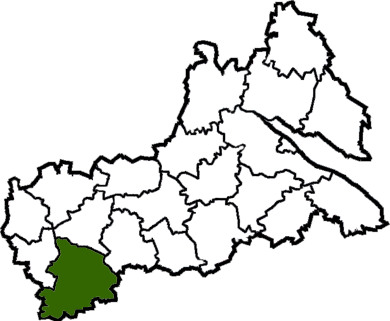
Uman Raion in Cherkasy Oblast (1966-2020)

Before the 2020 reform, the raion consisted of four hromadas:

- Babanka settlement hromada with the administration in Babanka;
- Dmytrushky rural hromada with the administration in Dmytrushky;
- Ladyzhynka rural hromada with the administration in Ladyzhynka;
- Palanka rural hromada with the administration in Palanka.

== Settlements ==
The city of Uman is the administrative center of the Umanskyi Raion, but the city was not subordinate to the raion administration, but instead was directly subordinate to the oblast administration.

Before 2020, Uman Raion included 1 urban-type settlement and 52 rural localities. Some of the raion's localities were:

- Babanka - 2,541 residents, urban-type settlement
- Ladyzhynka - 2,286 residents, village
- Kolodyste - 2,054 residents, village
- Stari Babany - 1,859 residents, village
- Palanka - 1,608 residents, village
- Horodnytsia - 1,146 residents, village
- Ryzhavka - 1,025 residents, village
- Tanske - 980 residents, village
- Ostrivets - 458 residents, village
- Zatyshok - 413 residents, village
- Stepkivka - 435 residents, village
- Antonivka - 637 residents, village
- Apolyanka - 578 residents, village
- Berestovets - 853 residents, village
- Korzhova - 117 residents, village
- Dubova - 589 residents, village
- Vilshanka - 215 residents, village
- Vilshanka-Slobidka - 285 residents, village
- Cherpovody - 784 residents, village
- Tomashivka - 671 residents, village

Ukraine's two the most famous granite deposits Starobabanske and Tanske are located in the raion. The first one in Stari Babany a few km north east of Uman and the second in the village of Tanske. Their granite production is widely exported.

== See also ==
- Subdivisions of Ukraine
- Sofiyivsky Park
- Uman uezd
