= Administrative divisions of Cherkasy Oblast =

Districts, territorial communities (hromadas) division

Cherkasy Oblast is subdivided into districts (raions) which are further subdivided into territorial communities (hromadas).

== Current ==
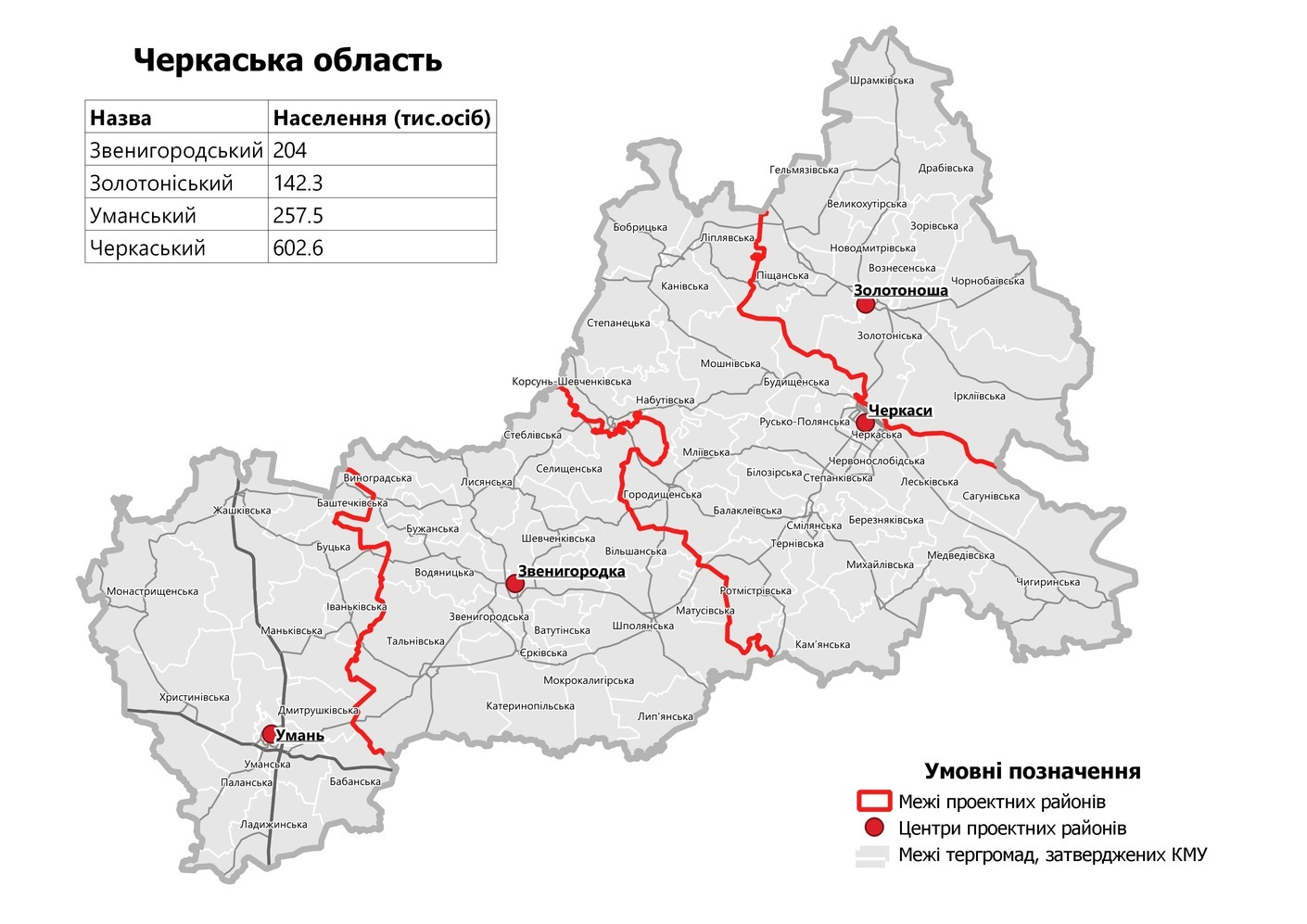
Raions of Cherkasy Oblast as of August 2020.

On 18 July 2020, the number of districts was reduced to four. These are:

1. Cherkasy (Черкаський район), the center is in the city of Cherkasy;
2. Uman (Уманський район), the center is in the city of Uman;
3. Zolotonosha (Золотоніський район), the center is in the city of Zolotonosha;
4. Zvenyhorodka (Звенигородський район), the center is in the city of Zvenyhorodka.

**Cherkasy Oblast**
As of January 1, 2022
Number of districts (райони)	4
Number of hromadas (громади)	66

=== Communities (hromadas) per District (raion) ===
In bold are communities (hromadas) with cities

Cherkasy Raion

- Balakleya
- Berezniaky
- Bilozirya
- Bobrytsia
- Budyshche
- **Cherkasy**
- **Chyhyryn**
- **Horodyshche**
- **Kamyanka**
- **Kaniv**
- **Korsun-Shevchenkivskyi**
- Lesky
- Lipliave
- Medvedivka
- Mliiv
- Moshny
- Mykhailivka
- Nabutiv
- Rotmistrivka
- Ruska Poliana
- Sahunivka
- Sloboda
- **Smila**
- Stepanky
- Stepantsi
- Ternivka

Uman Raion

- Babanka
- Bashtechky
- Buky
- Dmytrushky
- Ivanky
- **Khrystynivka**
- Ladyzhynka
- Mankivka
- **Monastyryshche**
- Palanka
- **Uman**
- **Zhashkiv**

Zolotonosha Raion

- Chornobai
- Drabiv
- Helmiaziv
- Irkliiv
- Nova Dmytrivka
- Pishchane
- Shramkivka
- Velykyi Khutir
- Voznesenske
- **Zolotonosha**
- Zorivka

Zvenyhorodka Raion

- **Bahacheve**
- Buzhanka
- Kalynopil
- Lypyanka
- Lysianka
- Matusiv
- Mokra Kalyhirka
- Selyshche
- Shevchenkove
- **Shpola**
- Stebliv
- **Talne**
- Vilshana
- Vodianyky
- Vynohrad
- Yerky
- **Zvenyhorodka**

== Administrative divisions until 2020 ==
Raions of Cherkasy Oblast as of June 2020. The city of Cherkasy is shown in dark blue.

Before July 2020, Cherkasy Oblast was subdivided into 32 regions: 26 districts (raions) and 6 city municipalities (mis'krada or misto), officially known as territories governed by city councils.

- Cities under the oblast's jurisdiction:
  - Cherkasy Municipality
    - Cities under the city's jurisdiction:
      - Cherkasy (Черкаси), the administrative center of the oblast
  - Kaniv (Канів)
  - Smila Municipality
    - Cities under the city's jurisdiction:
      - Smila (Сміла)
  - Uman (Умань)
  - Vatutine municipality
    - Cities under the city's jurisdiction:
      - Vatutine (Ватутіне)
  - Zolotonosha Municipality
    - Cities under the city's jurisdiction:
      - Zolotonosha (Золотоноша)
- Districts (raions):
  - Cherkasy (Черкаський район)
    - Urban-type settlements under the district's jurisdiction:
      - Irdyn (Ірдинь)
  - Chornobai (Чорнобаївський район)
    - Urban-type settlements under the district's jurisdiction:
      - Chornobai (Чорнобай)
  - Chyhyryn (Чигиринський район)
    - Cities under the district's jurisdiction:
      - Chyhyryn (Чигирин)
  - Drabiv (Драбівський район)
    - Urban-type settlements under the district's jurisdiction:
      - Drabiv (Драбів)
  - Horodyshche (Городищенський район)
    - Cities under the district's jurisdiction:
      - Horodyshche (Городище)
    - Urban-type settlements under the district's jurisdiction:
      - Tsvitkove (Цвіткове)
      - Vilshana (Вільшана)
  - Kamianka (Кам'янський район)
    - Cities under the district's jurisdiction:
      - Kamianka (Кам'янка)
  - Kaniv (Канівський район)
  - Katerynopil (Катеринопільський район)
    - Urban-type settlements under the district's jurisdiction:
      - Katerynopil (Катеринопіль)
      - Yerky (Єрки)
  - Khrystynivka (Христинівський район)
    - Cities under the district's jurisdiction:
      - Khrystynivka (Христинівка)
    - Urban-type settlements under the district's jurisdiction:
      - Verkhniachka (Верхнячка)
  - Korsun-Shevchenkivskyi (Корсунь-Шевченківський район)
    - Cities under the district's jurisdiction:
      - Korsun-Shevchenkivskyi (Корсунь-Шевченківський)
    - Urban-type settlements under the district's jurisdiction:
      - Stebliv (Стеблів)
  - Lysianka (Лисянський район)
    - Urban-type settlements under the district's jurisdiction:
      - Lysianka (Лисянка)
  - Mankivka (Маньківський район)
    - Urban-type settlements under the district's jurisdiction:
      - Buky (Буки)
      - Mankivka (Маньківка)
  - Monastyryshche (Монастирищенський район)
    - Cities under the district's jurisdiction:
      - Monastyryshche (Монастирище)
    - Urban-type settlements under the district's jurisdiction:
      - Tsybuliv (Цибулів)
  - Shpola (Шполянський район)
    - Cities under the district's jurisdiction:
      - Shpola (Шпола)
  - Smila (Смілянський район)
  - Talne (Тальнівський район)
    - Cities under the district's jurisdiction:
      - Talne (Тальне)
  - Uman (Уманський район)
    - Urban-type settlements under the district's jurisdiction:
      - Babanka (Бабанка)
  - Zhashkiv (Жашківський район)
    - Cities under the district's jurisdiction:
      - Zhashkiv (Жашків)
  - Zolotonosha (Золотоніський район)
  - Zvenyhorodka (Звенигородський район)
    - Cities under the district's jurisdiction:
      - Zvenyhorodka (Звенигородка)
