= Tsvitkove =

Rural locality in Cherkasy Oblast, Ukraine

Tsvitkove Цвіткове
- Rural settlement
- Location of Tsvitkove in Ukraine Tsvitkove (Ukraine)
- Coordinates: 49°09′18″N 31°31′52″E
- Country: Ukraine
- Oblast: Cherkasy Oblast
- Raion: Cherkasy Raion
- Founded: 1876
- Town status: 1960

Government
  - Town Head: Mykola Nadych
- Elevation: 174 m (571 ft)

Population (2022)
  - Total: 1,130
- Time zone: UTC+2 (EET)
  - Summer (DST): UTC+3 (EEST)
- Postal code: 19537
- Area code: +380 4734
- Website: rada.gov.ua

Tsvitkove (Ukrainian: Цвіткове) is a rural settlement in Cherkasy Raion, Cherkasy Oblast, central Ukraine. It is located in Horodyshche urban hromada, one of the hromadas of Ukraine, the administration of which is located in the town of Horodyshche. Population: 1,130 (2022 estimate).

== History ==
Until 18 July 2020, Tsvitkove belonged to Horodyshche Raion. The raion was abolished in July 2020 as part of the administrative reform of Ukraine, which reduced the number of raions of Cherkasy Oblast to four. The area of Horodyshche Raion was split between Cherkasy and Zvenyhorodka Raions, with Tsvitkove being transferred to Cherkasy Raion.

Until 26 January 2024, Tsvitkove was designated urban-type settlement. On this day, a new law entered into force which abolished this status, and Tsvitkove became a rural settlement.
