= Boris Bugayev =

Soviet aviator and politician (1923–2007)

- Борис Бугаев
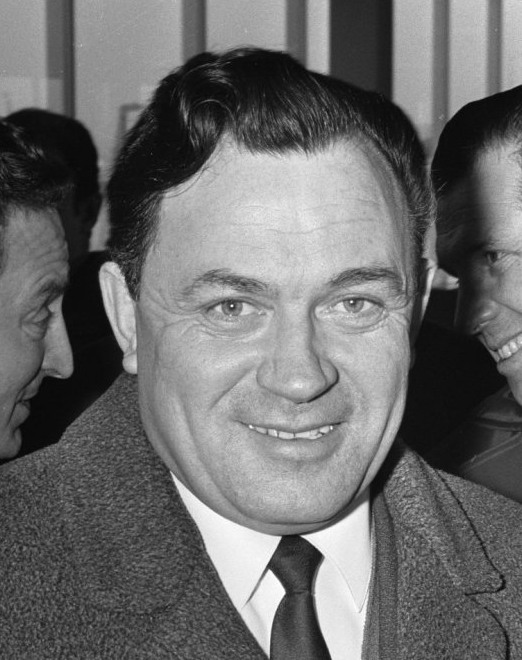
- Bugayev in 1970
- Born: 9 July 1923; Mankivka, Cherkasy Oblast, Ukrainian SSR, Soviet Union
- Died: 13 January 2007 (aged 83); Moscow, Russia
- Occupations: air transport pilot; minister of civil aviation of the USSR; politician
- Years active: 1942-1987
- Known for: Long-term minister of civil aviation of the USSR
- Awards: Hero of Socialist Labour (1966 and 1983); Lenin Prize (1980); USSR State Prize (1972)
- Aviation career
- Battles: Great Patriotic War
- Rank: Chief marshal of the aviation

Signature
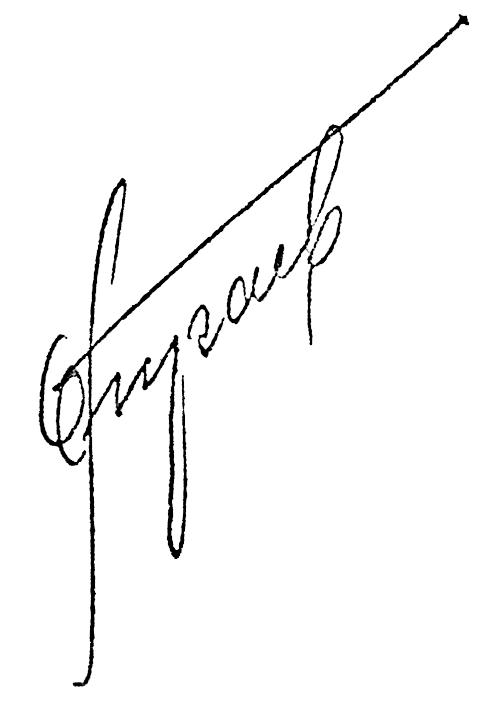

Boris Pavlovich Bugaev (Russian: Борис Павлович Бугаев; Ukrainian: Борис Павлович Бугаєв; 9 July 1923 – 13 January 2007) was a Soviet military pilot and politician.

== Biography ==
Bugaev was born in the village of Mankivka in the Ukrainian Soviet Socialist Republic into a family of teachers. From 1941 to 1942 he was a cadet on aircraft training squadrons. He spent World War II years from 1942 to 1943 as a pilot instructor and then as an operational pilot.

After the war Bugaev left the Soviet Air Forces and worked in civil aviation. He began to be involved in politics around the same time, and joined the Communist Party in 1946. As a pilot for Aeroflot, he undertook several pioneering flights to explore new routes, including to India, Burma and Indonesia.

Bugaev was a trusted pilot of Leonid Brezhnev for many years, which helped Bugaev throughout his career. On 9 February 1961 he flew an Ilyushin Il-18 carrying Brezhnev and the Soviet delegation to Guinea. The plane was attacked by a hijacked French Armée de l'Air jet above the Mediterranean Sea, near Algeria, which fired twice at his aircraft. Bugaev managed to maneuver the plane out of danger and was highly praised by Brezhnev.

In 1966 Bugaev was appointed Deputy Minister for Civil Aviation and the following year he became First Deputy Minister of Civil Aviation. 1966 also saw Bugaev granted the honorary title of Hero of Socialist Labour.

From 1970 to 1987 Bugaev was the Minister of Civil Aviation of the USSR. On 5 November 1973 he was promoted to Marshal of the aviation and on 28 October 1977 to Chief marshal of the aviation. He retired in 1992 and died on 13 January 2007 in Moscow.

== Honours and awards ==
- Hero of Socialist Labour, twice (1966, 1983)
- Five Orders of Lenin
- Order of the October Revolution
- Order of the Red Banner, twice
- Order of the Patriotic War, 1st class
- Order of the Red Star
- Order for Service to the Homeland in the Armed Forces of the USSR, 3rd class
- Order of the Badge of Honour
- Lenin Prize (1980)
- USSR State Prize (1972)
- Diploma of the Government of the Russian Federation (1998, 2003)
- Medal "For the Victory over Germany in the Great Patriotic War 1941–1945"
- Medal "For Distinguished Labour"
