= List of cities in Cherkasy Oblast =

Location of cities in Cherkasy Oblast

There are 16 populated places in Cherkasy Oblast, Ukraine, that have been officially granted city status (Ukrainian: місто, romanized: misto) by the Verkhovna Rada, the country's parliament. Settlements with more than 10,000 people are eligible for city status, although the status is typically also granted to settlements of historical or regional importance. As of 5 December 2001, the date of the first and only official census in the country since independence, (Note: As of 11 July 2023) the most populous city in the oblast was the regional capital, Cherkasy, with a population of 295,414 people, while the least populous city was Monastyryshche, with 9,463 people. In 2024, following the passage of derussification laws, the city of Vatutine was renamed Bahacheve.

From independence in 1991 to 2020, six cities in the oblast were designated as cities of regional significance (municipalities), which had self-government under city councils, while the oblast's remaining 10 cities were located amongst 26 raions (districts) as cities of district significance, which are subordinated to the governments of the raions. On 18 July 2020, an administrative reform abolished and merged the oblast's raions and cities of regional significance into four new, expanded raions. The four raions that make up the oblast are Cherkasy, Uman, Zolotonosha, and Zvenyhorodka.

== List of cities ==
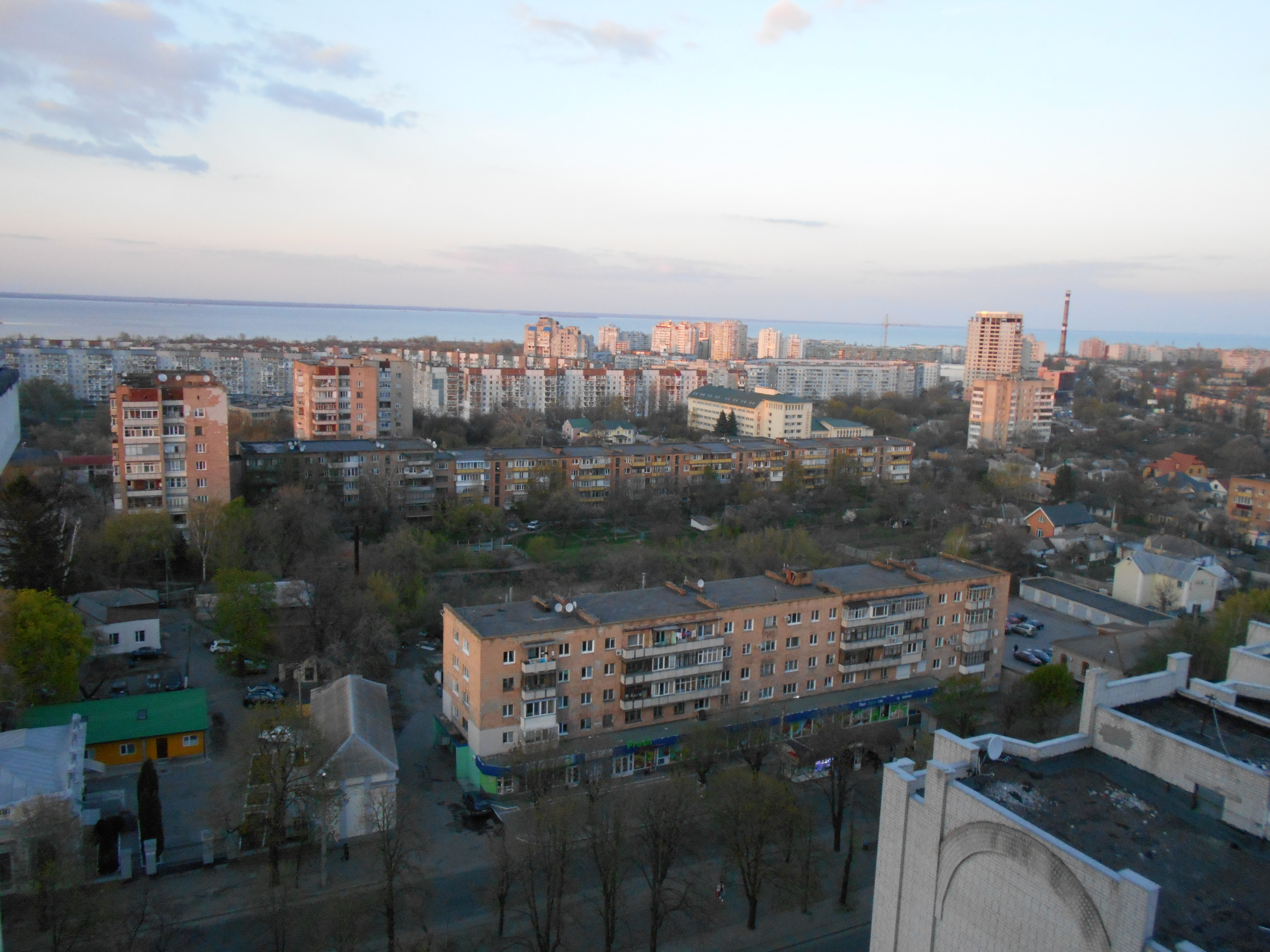
Cherkasy, capital and most populous city in Cherkasy Oblast

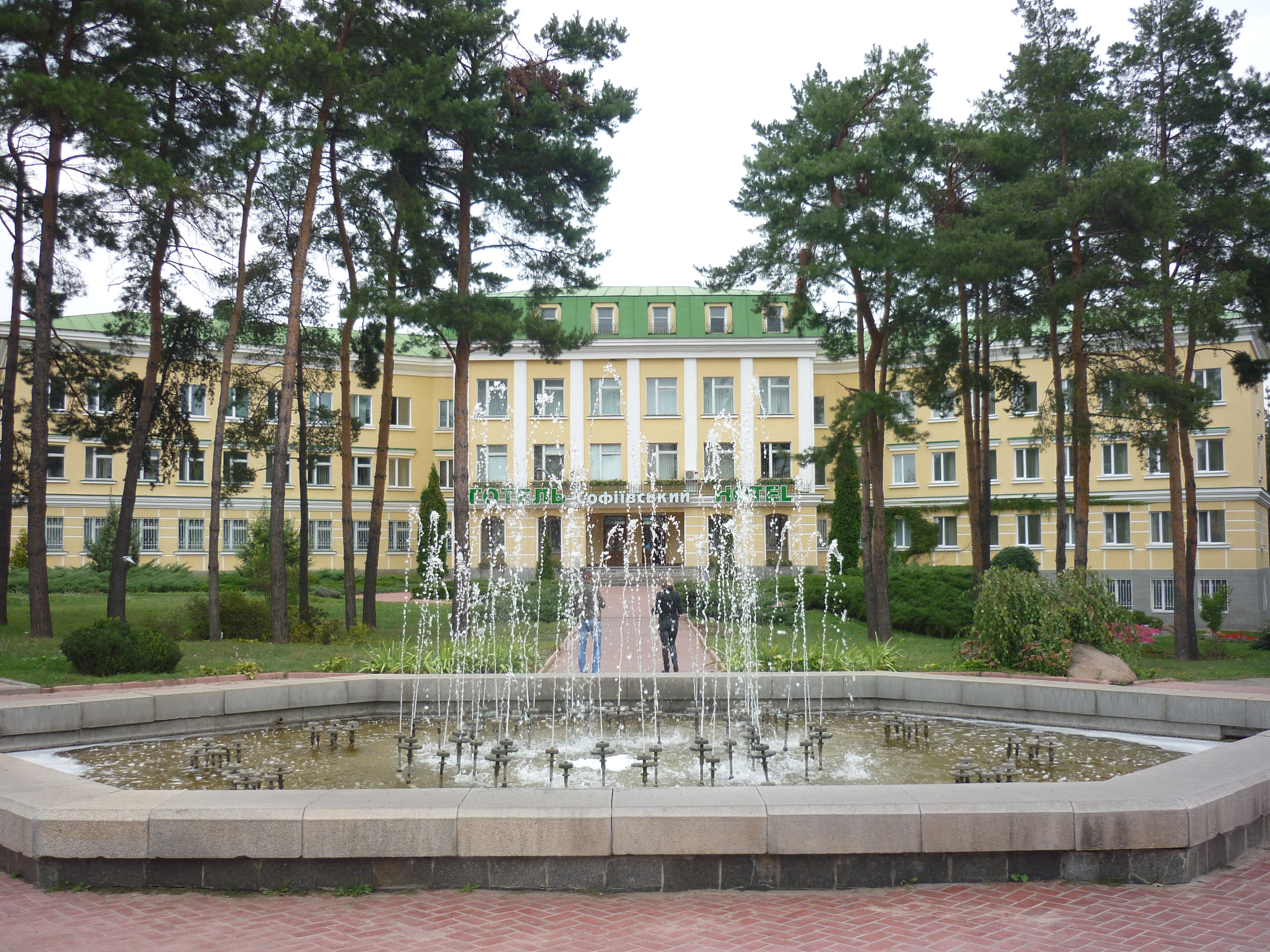
Uman, second most populous city in the oblast and the site of the yearly Rosh Hashana kibbutz

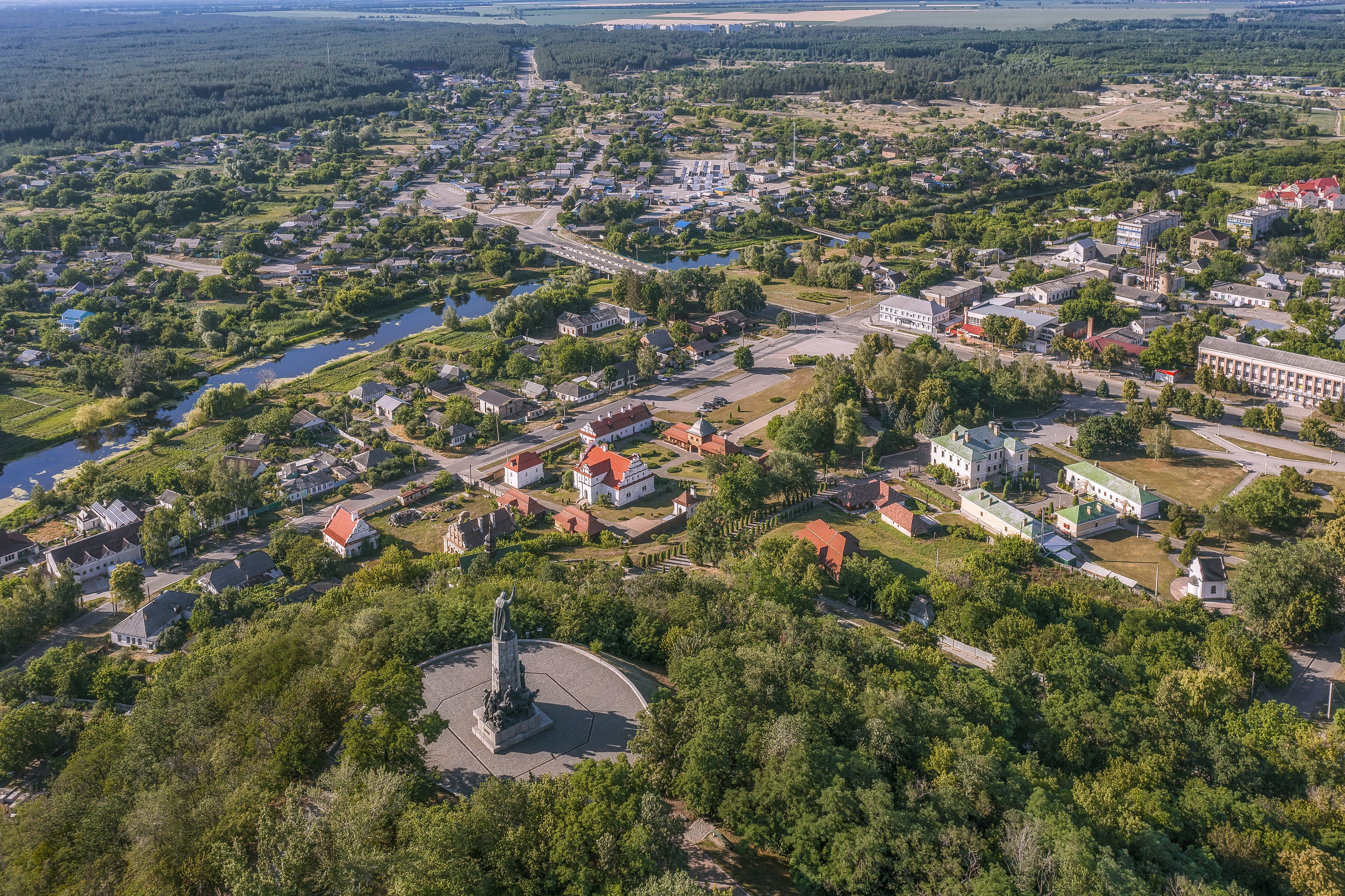
Chyhyryn, a historic city that served as the capital of the Cossack Hetmanate

Cities in Cherkasy Oblast
Name	Name (in Ukrainian) (Note: Links to the Ukrainian Wikipedia articles for each city)	Raion (district)	Population (2022 estimates)	Population (2001 census)	Population change
Bahacheve	Багачеве	Zvenyhorodka	15,763	20,156	−21.79%
Cherkasy	Черкаси	Cherkasy	269,836	295,414	−8.66%
Chyhyryn	Чигирин	Cherkasy	8,539	11,960	−28.60%
Horodyshche	Городище	Cherkasy	13,062	15,645	−16.51%
Kamianka	Кам'янка	Cherkasy	10,945	15,109	−27.56%
Kaniv	Канів	Cherkasy	23,172	26,657	−13.07%
Korsun-Shevchenkivskyi	Корсунь-Шевченківський	Cherkasy	17,216	19,311	−10.85%
Khrystynivka	Христинівка	Uman	9,879	11,650	−15.20%
Monastyryshche	Монастирище	Uman	8,338	9,463	−11.89%
Shpola	Шпола	Zvenyhorodka	16,323	19,427	−15.98%
Smila	Сміла	Cherkasy	65,675	69,681	−5.75%
Talne	Тальне	Zvenyhorodka	12,839	16,388	−21.66%
Uman	Умань	Uman	81,525	88,735	−8.13%
Zhashkiv	Жашків	Uman	13,242	15,853	−16.47%
Zvenyhorodka	Звенигородка	Zvenyhorodka	16,269	19,901	−18.25%
Zolotonosha	Золотоноша	Zolotonosha	27,206	28,793	−5.51%

== See also ==
- List of cities in Ukraine
