= Mankivka Raion =

Former subdivision of Cherkasy Oblast, Ukraine

Mankivka Raion Маньківський район
- Raion
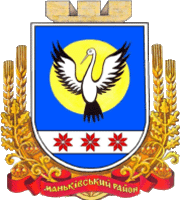
- Flag Coat of arms

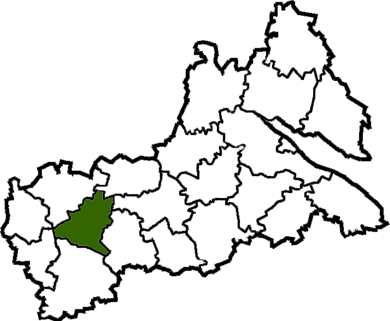
- Raion location in Cherkasy Oblast
- Coordinates: 49°0′9.4″N 30°21′34.4″E
- Country: Ukraine
- Oblast: Cherkasy Oblast
- Disestablished: 18 July 2020
- Admin. center: Mankivka

Population (2020)
  - Total: 26,211
- Time zone: UTC+2 (EET)
  - Summer (DST): UTC+3 (EEST)

Mankivka Raion (Ukrainian: Маньківський район) was a raion (district) of Cherkasy Oblast in central Ukraine. Its administrative center was located at the urban-type settlement of Mankivka. The raion was abolished on 18 July 2020 as part of the administrative reform of Ukraine, which reduced the number of raions of Cherkasy Oblast to four. The area of Mankivka Raion was merged into Uman Raion. The last estimated population of the raion was 26,211 (2020 est.).

At the time of disestablishment, the raion consisted of three hromadas:

- Buky settlement hromada with the administration in the urban-type settlement of Buky;
- Ivanky rural hromada with the administration in the selo of Ivanky;
- Mankivka settlement hromada with the administration in Mankivka.
