= Buky settlement hromada =

Buky settlement hromada Буцька селищна громада
- Hromada
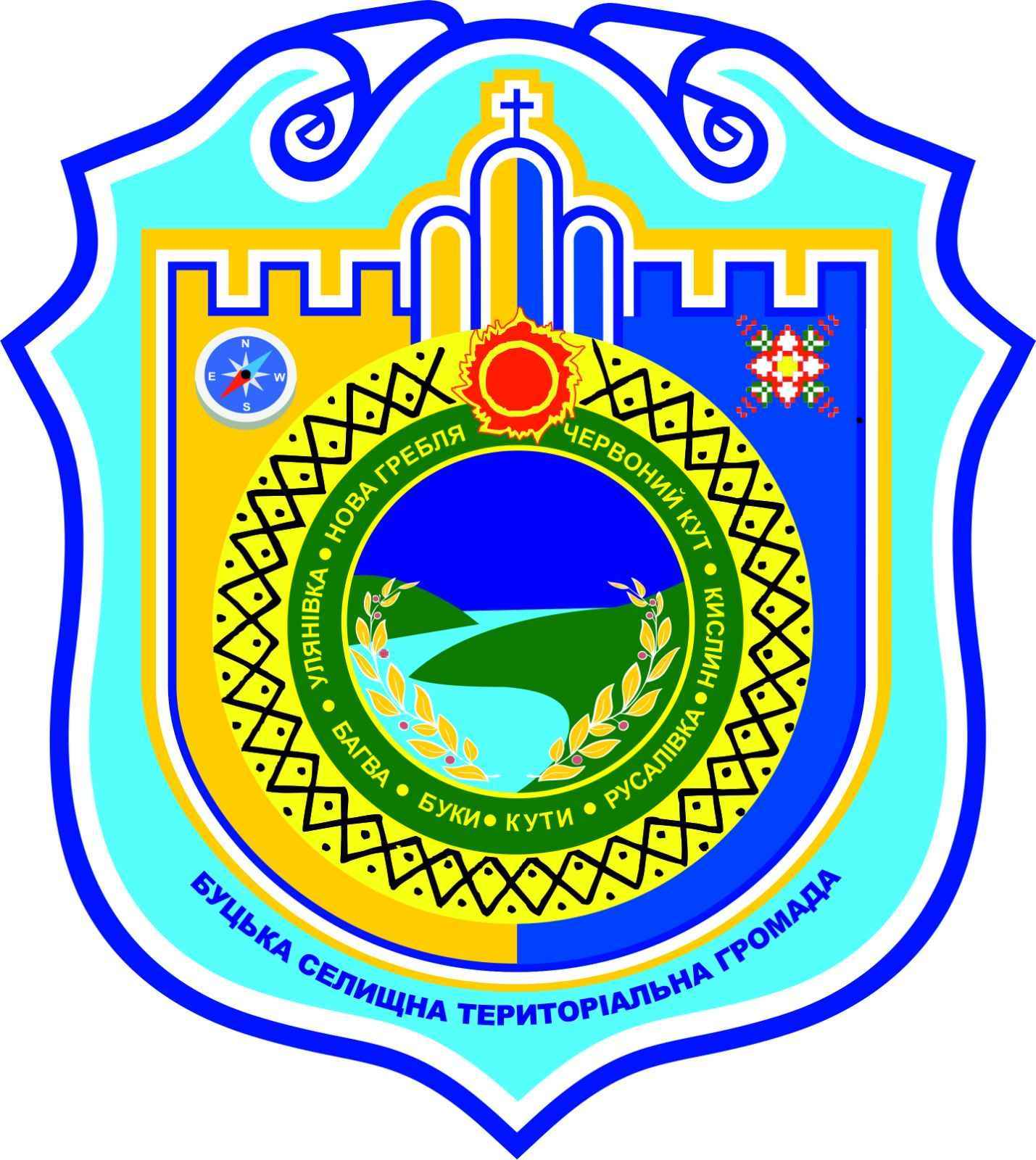
- Seal
- Interactive map of Buky settlement hromada
- Country: Ukraine
- Oblast: Cherkasy
- Raion: Uman

Area
  - Total: 1,901 km^{2} (734 sq mi)

Population
  - Total: 5,176
  - Density: 2.723/km^{2} (7.052/sq mi)
- Website: bucka-gromada.gov.ua

Buky settlement hromada (Ukrainian: Буцька селищна громада) is a hromada in the Uman Raion of Cherkasy Oblast in Ukraine. Its administrative seat is the rural settlement of Buky.

== Localities ==
Urban-type settlement:

- Buky (administrative centre)

Villages:

- Bahva
- Kyslyn
- Kuty, Uman Raion
- Nova Hreblia, Uman Raion
- Rusalivka
- Ulianivka, Uman Raion
- Chervonyi Kut, Uman Raion
