= Buky Canyon =

- Буцький каньйон
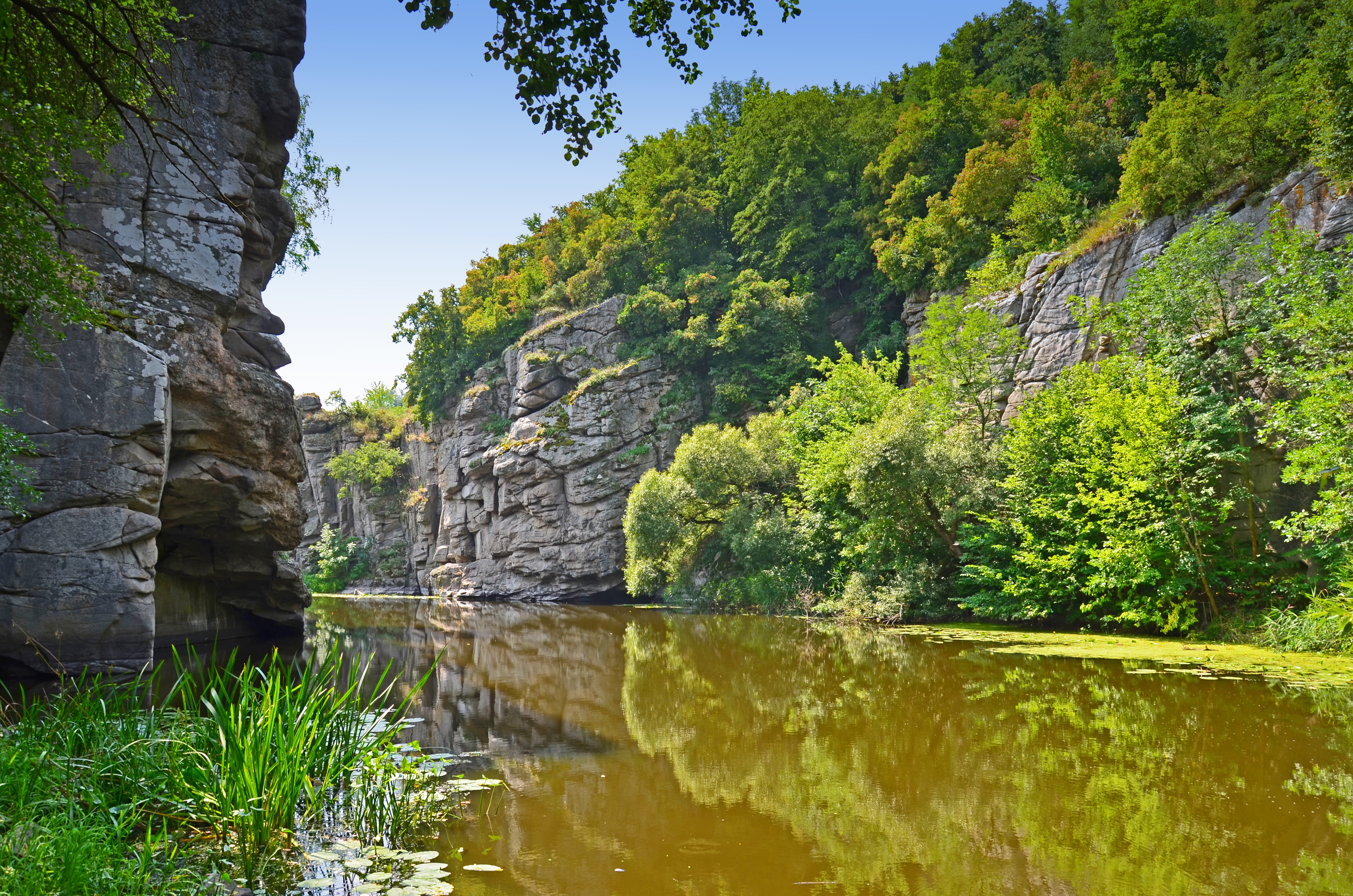
- Hirskyi Tikych River (Buky, Cherkasy Oblast, Ukraine)

- Location within Ukraine
- Location: Ukraine; Cherkasy Oblast, Uman Raion, Buky
- Coordinates: 49°5′45″N 30°23′41″E

Buky Canyon is a canyon near the rural settlement of Buky, on the Hirskyi Tikych river in the Cherkasy Oblast (province) of Ukraine. It is approximately 5 km (3.1 mi) long, 20 m (66 ft) deep, and anywhere from 20 to 40 m (66 to 131 ft) wide.
