= Maksym Zalizniak oak tree =

Coordinates: 49°06′34.9″N 32°15′36.8″E

Maksym Zalizniak Oak
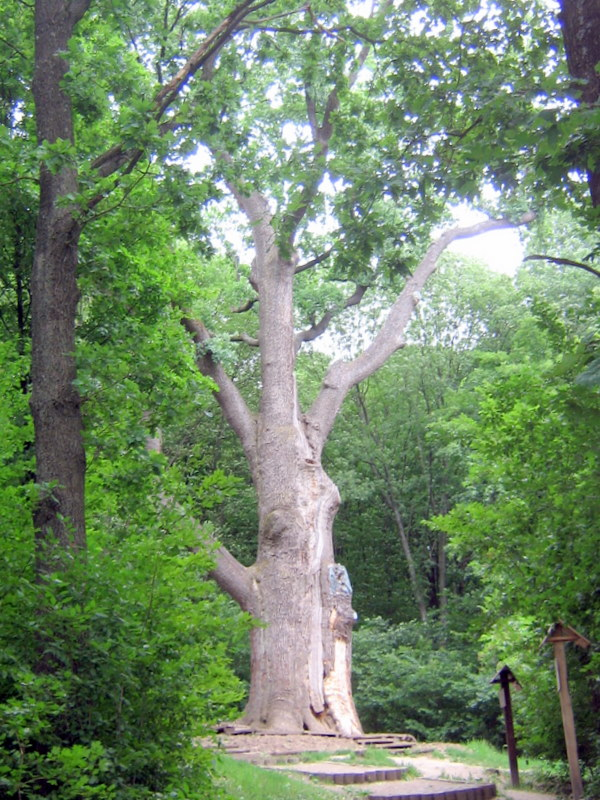
- Millennial oak tree of Maksym Zalizniak
- Interactive map of Maksym Zalizniak Oak

Maksym Zalizniak Oak
- Interactive map of Maksym Zalizniak Oak

Immovable Monument of Local Significance of Ukraine
- Official name: Урочище «Дуб Максима Залізняка» (Tract "Oak of Maksym Zalizniak")
- Type: Landscape
- Reference no.: 123-Чк

The Maksym Zalizniak oak tree (Ukrainian: Дуб Максима Залізняка, romanized: Dub Maksyma Zalizniaka) is a natural monument in Ukraine. It is located near the Buda village in Cherkasy Raion of Cherkasy Oblast, Ukraine, and cared for by the National Historical and Cultural Reserve "Chyhyryn". The tree took 3rd prize in the "National Tree of Ukraine" national competition in 2010. Being over 1,100 year old, it is one of the oldest and biggest trees in Ukraine and Europe. It is named after Maksym Zalizniak, a leader of the Koliivshchyna rebellion of haidamaks in 1768. Its trunk is 9 metres (30 ft) in circumference and is about 30 metres (98 ft) tall.
