= Vilshana, Cherkasy Oblast =

Rural locality in Cherkasy Oblast, Ukraine

Vilshana Вільшана
- Rural settlement
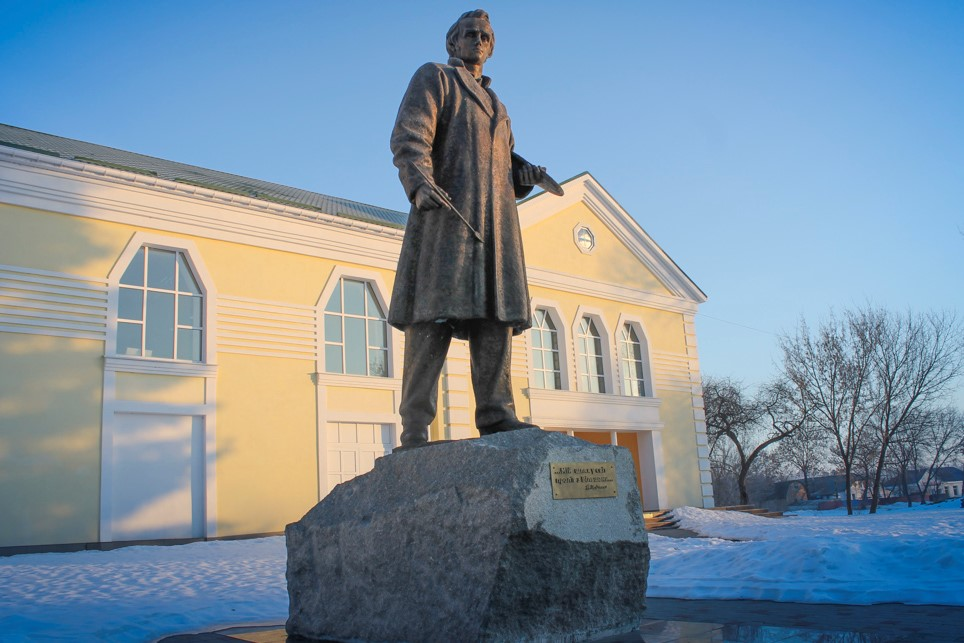
- Taras Shevchenko monument in Vilshana

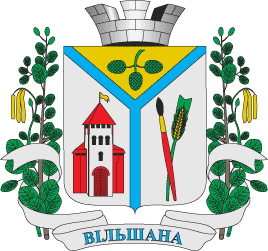
- Flag Coat of arms

- Location of Vilshana in Ukraine Vilshana (Ukraine)
- Coordinates: 49°12′35″N 31°12′32″E
- Country: Ukraine
- Oblast: Cherkasy Oblast
- Raion: Zvenyhorodka Raion
- First mentioned: 1598

Government
  - Town Head: Volodymyr Yarovyi
- Elevation: 231 m (758 ft)

Population (2022)
  - Total: 2,919
- Time zone: UTC+2 (EET)
  - Summer (DST): UTC+3 (EEST)
- Postal code: 19523
- Area code: +380 4734
- Website: http://rada.gov.ua/

Vilshana (Ukrainian: Вільшана) is a rural settlement in Zvenyhorodka Raion, Cherkasy Oblast, central Ukraine. It hosts the administration of Vilshana settlement hromada, one of the hromadas of Ukraine. Population: 2,919 (2022 estimate).

== Geography ==
Vilshana is located on the upper flow of river Vilshanka, a tributary of the Dnieper.

== History ==
Archeological excavations have demonstrated that the area of Vilshana was inhabited over 5,000 years ago. By around the second-to-fifth century CE, it was inhabited by Slavs. It became part of the Kievan Rus', near its southern border.

Vilshana is first mentioned in written sources in 1598 as the town (mistechko) of Olshana.

From 1923 to 1931, Vilshana served as the administrative center of Vilshana Raion, Cherkasy Oblast. As a result of the Holodomor, a manmade famine in Soviet Ukraine in 1932–1933, 82 people are confirmed to have died in Vilshana. In 1935, Vilshana again became the administrative center of the re-established Vilshana Raion. During World War II, Vilshana was occupied by Nazi Germany between 28 July 1941 and 5 February 1944. In 1959, Vilshana Raion was again abolished. From 1965 onward, Vilshana was designated an urban-type settlement.

Until 18 July 2020, Vilshana belonged to Horodyshche Raion. The raion was abolished in July 2020 as part of the administrative reform of Ukraine, which reduced the number of raions of Cherkasy Oblast to four. The area of Horodyshche Raion was split between Cherkasy and Zvenyhorodka Raions, with Vilshana being transferred to Zvenyhorodka Raion. On 26 January 2024, a new law entered into force which abolished the status of urban-type settlements in Ukraine, so Vilshana became a rural settlement.

== Demographics ==
According to the 2001 Ukrainian census, Vilshana had a population of 3,653 people, predominantly ethnic Ukrainians.

== Economy ==
Vilshana has been historically known as a centre of sugar industry.

== Notable people ==
- Taras Shevchenko (1814–1861), later a leading Ukrainian poet, lived there as a boy, 1828–1831.
- Jan Stanisławski (Vilshana, 24 June 1860 – 6 January 1907, Kraków), Polish modernist painter, art educator, and founder and member of various innovative art groups and literary societies.
- Jerzy Różycki (1909–1942), Polish mathematician and cryptologist who played a crucial role in breaking German Enigma-machine ciphers before and during World War II
