= Buky =

Rural locality in Cherkasy Oblast, Ukraine

Buky Буки
- Rural settlement
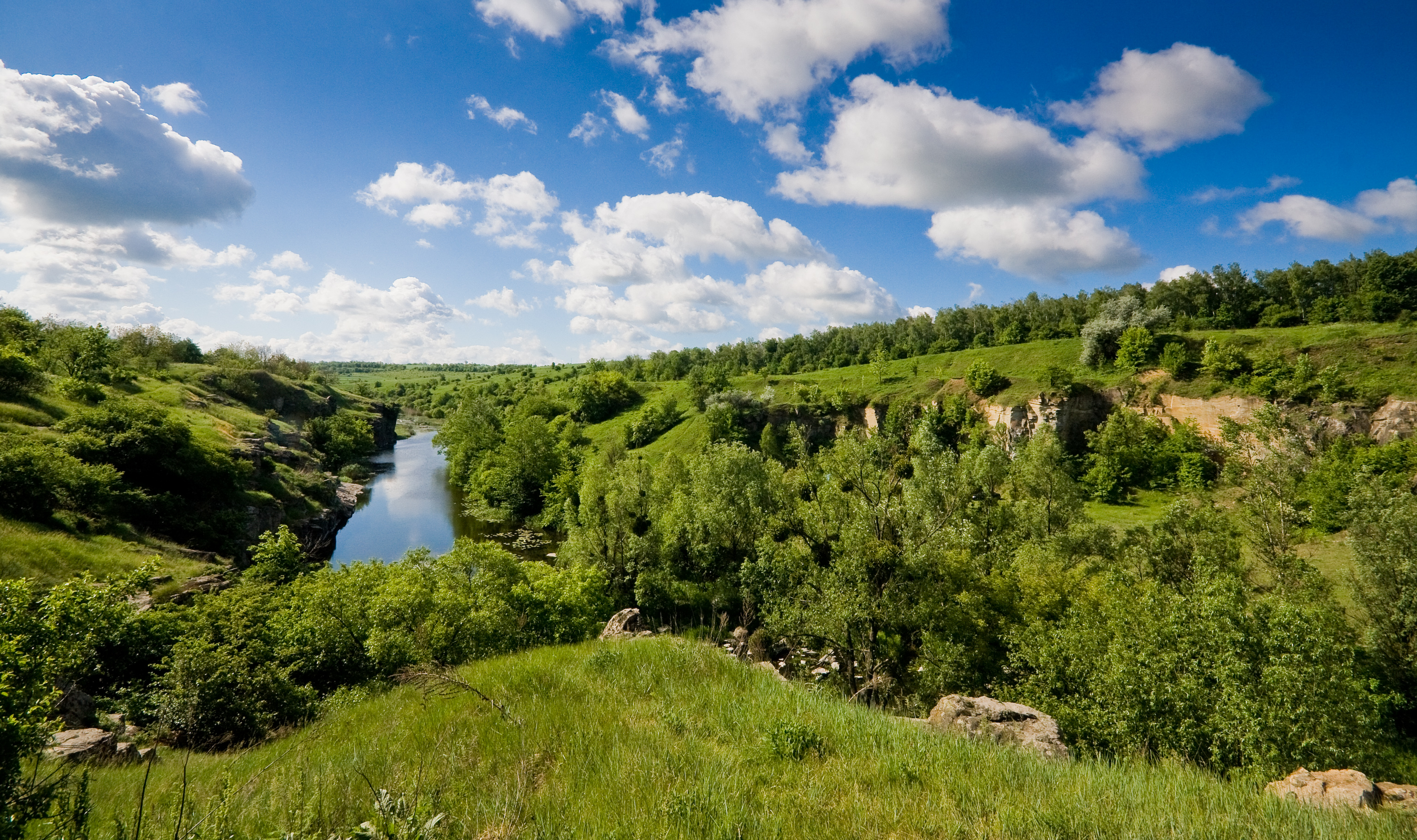
- The Hirskyi Tikych river in Buky

- Location of Buky Buky (Ukraine)
- Coordinates: 49°5′34″N 30°24′11″E
- Country: Ukraine
- Oblast: Cherkasy Oblast
- Raion: Uman Raion
- Hromada: Buky settlement hromada
- Founded: 1515

Population (2022)
  - Total: 1,738
- Postal code: 20114
- Area code: +380 4748

Buky (Ukrainian: Буки) is a rural settlement in Uman Raion, Cherkasy Oblast, Ukraine. It hosts the administration of Buky settlement hromada, one of the hromadas of Ukraine. Population: 1,738 (2022 estimate).

== History ==
Until 18 July 2020, Buky belonged to Mankivka Raion. The raion was abolished in July 2020 as part of the administrative reform of Ukraine, which reduced the number of raions of Cherkasy Oblast to four. The area of Mankivka Raion was merged into Uman Raion.

Until 26 January 2024, Buky was designated urban-type settlement. On this day, a new law entered into force which abolished this status, and Buky became a rural settlement.

== Points of interest ==
- Buky Canyon
