= Horodyshche urban hromada =

Urban hromada of Cherkasy Oblast, Ukraine

Coordinates: 49°15′30″N 31°27′00″E

Horodyshche urban hromada Городищенська міська громада
- Hromada
- Interactive map of Horodyshche urban hromada
- Country: Ukraine
- Oblast: Cherkasy
- Raion: Cherkasy

Area
  - Total: 371.9 km^{2} (143.6 sq mi)

Population (2020)
  - Total: 23,210
  - Density: 62.41/km^{2} (161.6/sq mi)
- Settlements: 10
- Cities: 1
- Rural settlements: 1
- Villages: 8
- Website: gormrada.gov.ua

Horodyshche urban territorial hromada (Ukrainian: Городищенська міська територіальна громада, romanized: Horodyshchenska miska terytorialna hromada) is one of the hromadas of Ukraine, in Cherkasy Raion within Cherkasy Oblast. Its administrative centre is the city of Horodyshche.

== Composition ==
The hromada contains 10 settlements: 1 city (Horodyshche), 1 rural settlement (Tsvitkove), and 8 villages:

- Dyrdyn
- Kalynivka
- Khlystunivka
- Ksaverove
- Nabokiv
- Orlovets
- Petropavlivka
- Valiava
