= Horodyshche Raion =

Former subdivision of Cherkasy Oblast, Ukraine

Coordinates: 49°10′15″N 31°24′33″E

- Raion
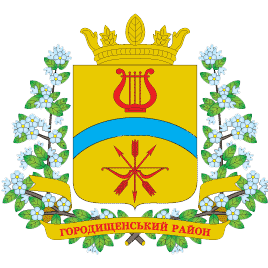
- Flag Coat of arms

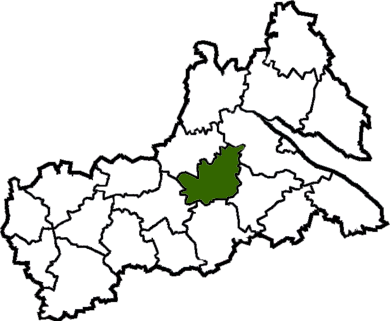
- Raion location in Cherkasy Oblast
- Country: Ukraine
- Region: Cherkasy Oblast
- Disestablished: 18 July 2020
- Subdivisions: 3 hromadas

Population (2020)
  - Total: 38,487
- Time zone: UTC+02:00 (EET)
  - Summer (DST): UTC+03:00 (EEST)
- Area code: +380

Horodyshche Raion (Ukrainian: Городищенський район) was a raion (district) of Cherkasy Oblast, central Ukraine. Its administrative centre was located at the town of Horodyshche. The raion was abolished on 18 July 2020 as part of the administrative reform of Ukraine, which reduced the number of raions of Cherkasy Oblast to four. The area of Horodyshche Raion was split between Cherkasy Raion and Zvenyhorodka Raion. The last estimate of the raion population was 38,487 (2020 est.).

== Subdivisions ==
At the time of disestablishment, the raion consisted of three hromadas:

- Horodyshche urban hromada with the administration in Horodyshche, transferred to Cherkasy Raion;
- Mlyiv rural hromada with the administration in the selo of Mlyiv, transferred to Cherkasy Raion;
- Vilshana settlement hromada with the administration in the urban-type settlement of Vilshana, transferred to Zvenyhorodka Raion.
