= Mankivka =

Rural locality in Cherkasy Oblast, Ukraine

Mankivka Маньківка
- Rural settlement
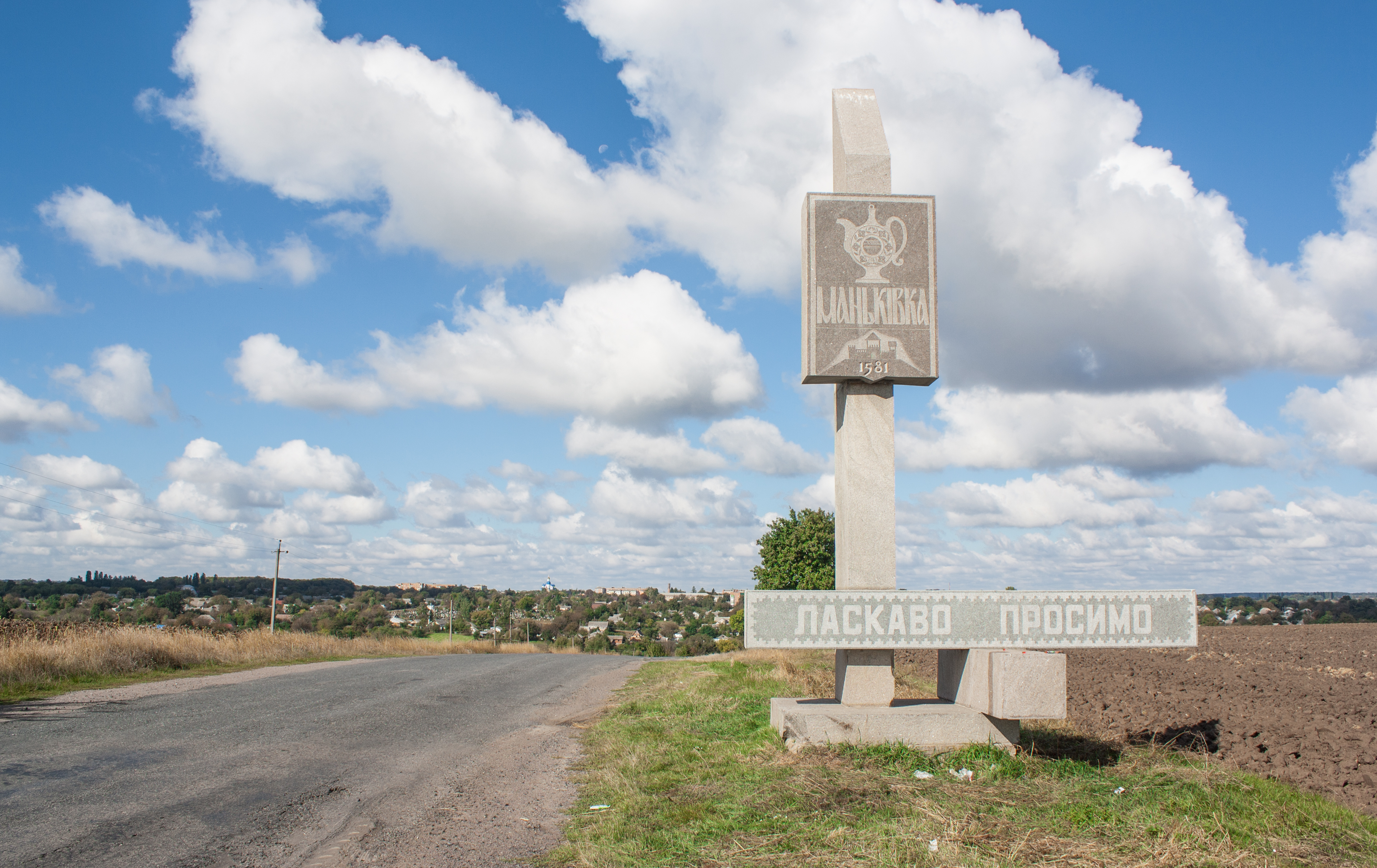
- Entrance

- Location of Mankivka in Ukraine Mankivka (Ukraine)
- Coordinates: 48°57′42″N 30°20′31″E
- Country: Ukraine
- Oblast: Cherkasy Oblast
- Raion: Uman Raion
- Town status: 1965

Government
  - Town Head: Serhiy Skakun

Population (2022)
  - Total: 7,440
- Time zone: UTC+2 (EET)
  - Summer (DST): UTC+3 (EEST)
- Postal code: 20100
- Area code: +380 4748
- Website: http://mankivka.com.ua/

Mankivka (Ukrainian: Маньківка) is a rural settlement in Uman Raion, Cherkasy Oblast, central Ukraine. It hosts the administration of Mankivka settlement hromada, one of the hromadas of Ukraine. Population: 7,440 (2022 estimate).

== History ==
Until 18 July 2020, Mankivka served as an administrative center of Mankivka Raion. The raion was abolished in July 2020 as part of the administrative reform of Ukraine, which reduced the number of raions of Cherkasy Oblast to four. The area of Mankivka Raion was merged into Uman Raion.

Until 26 January 2024, Mankivka was designated urban-type settlement. On this day, a new law entered into force which abolished this status, and Mankivka became a rural settlement.

== Notable people ==
- Andriy Novikov (born 1999), Ukrainian footballer

== Gallery ==
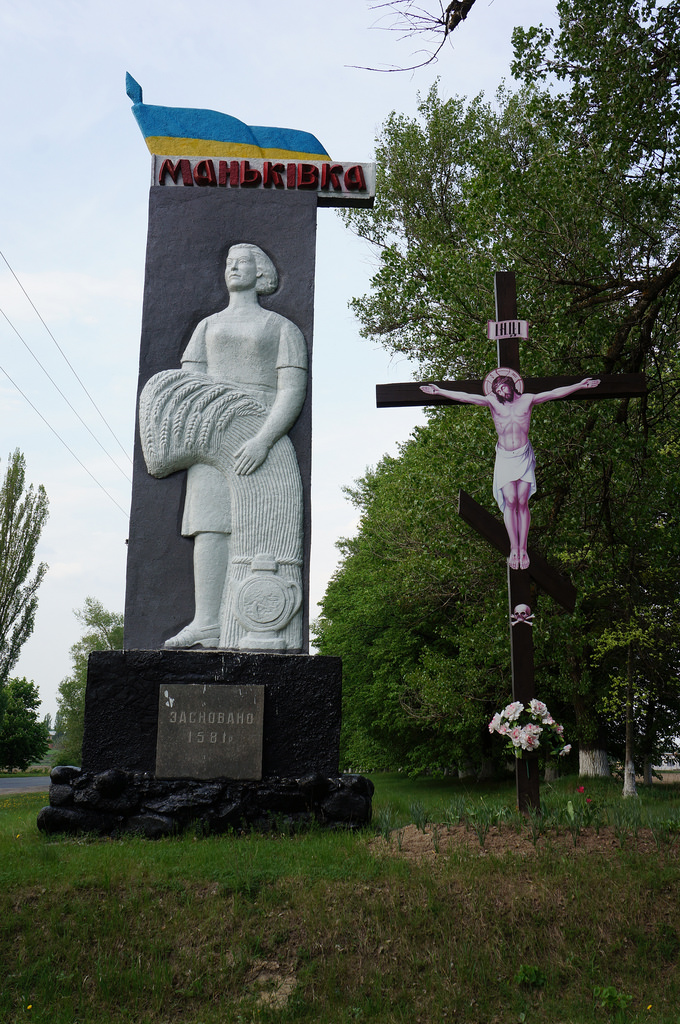
Entrance sign in Mańkivka

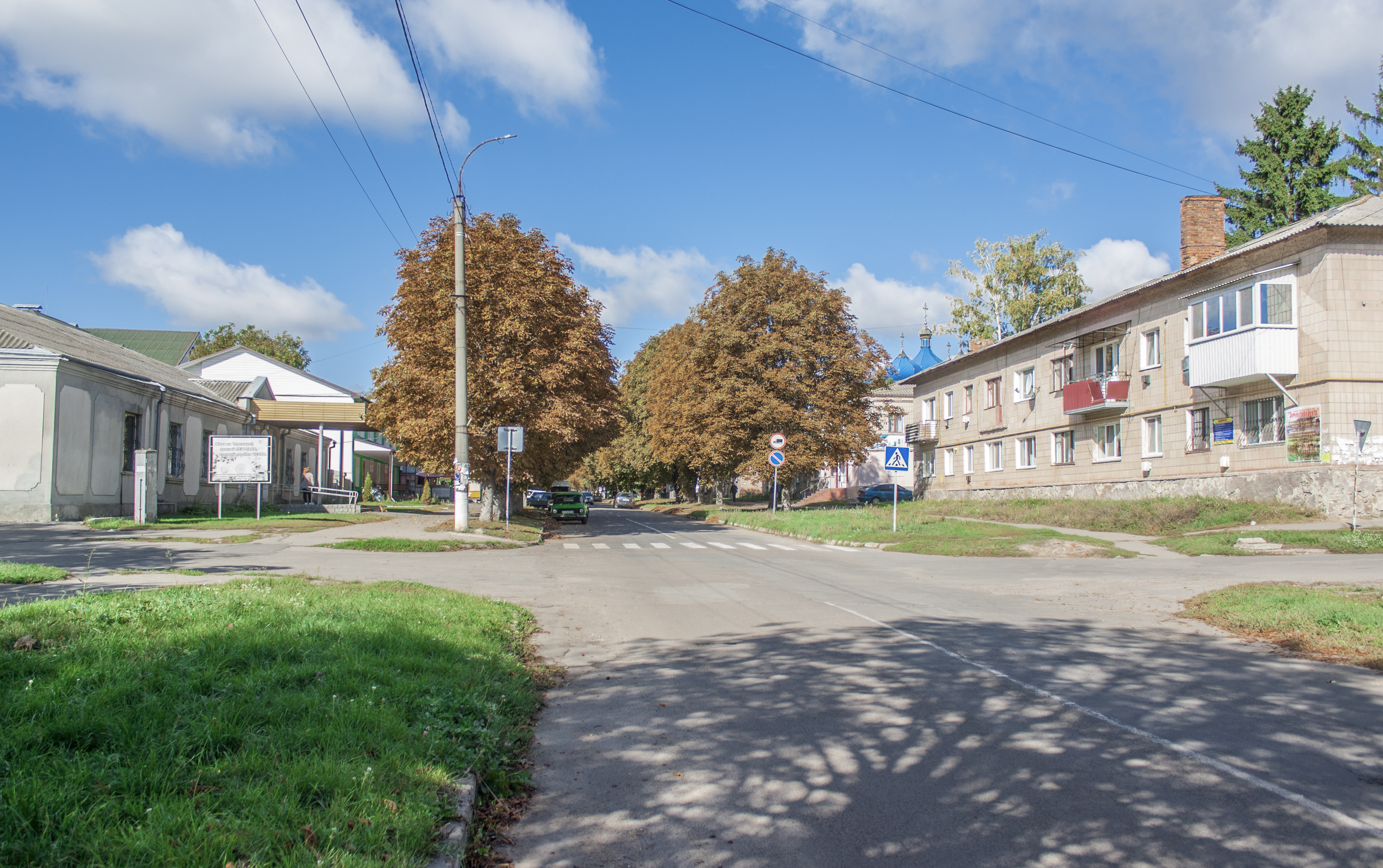
The intersection of Shevchenko and Zoryanaya streets

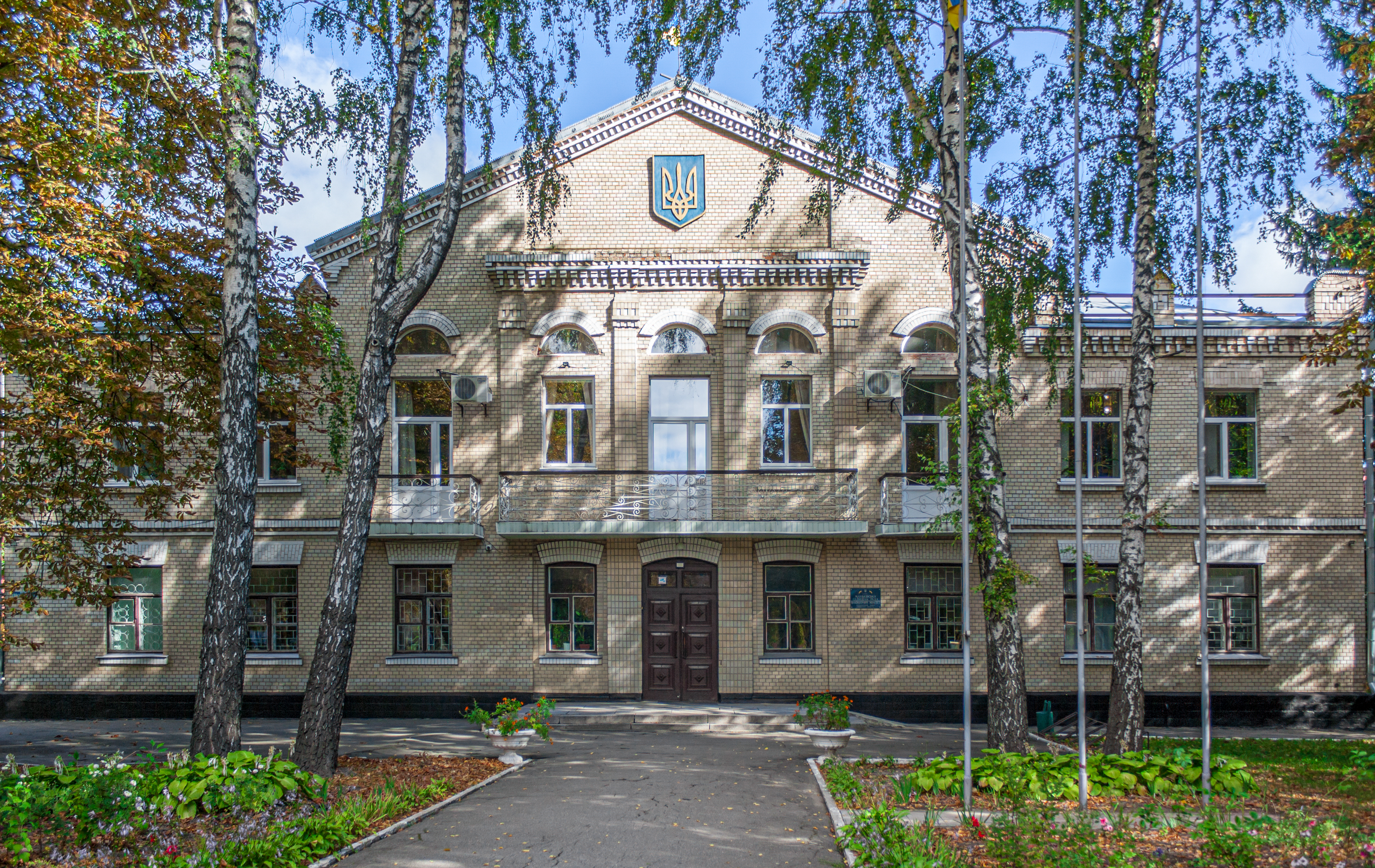
Village Council

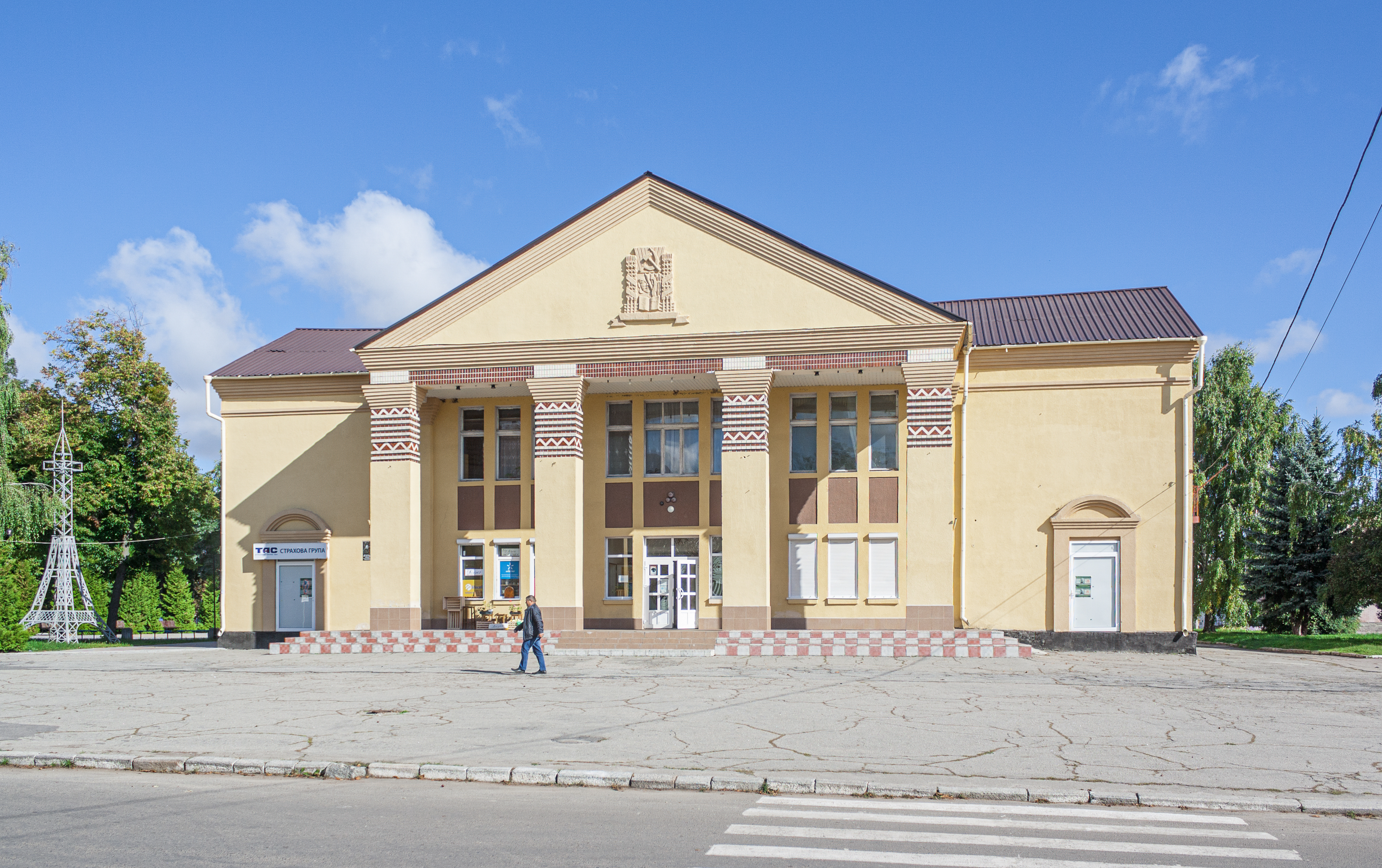
House of culture

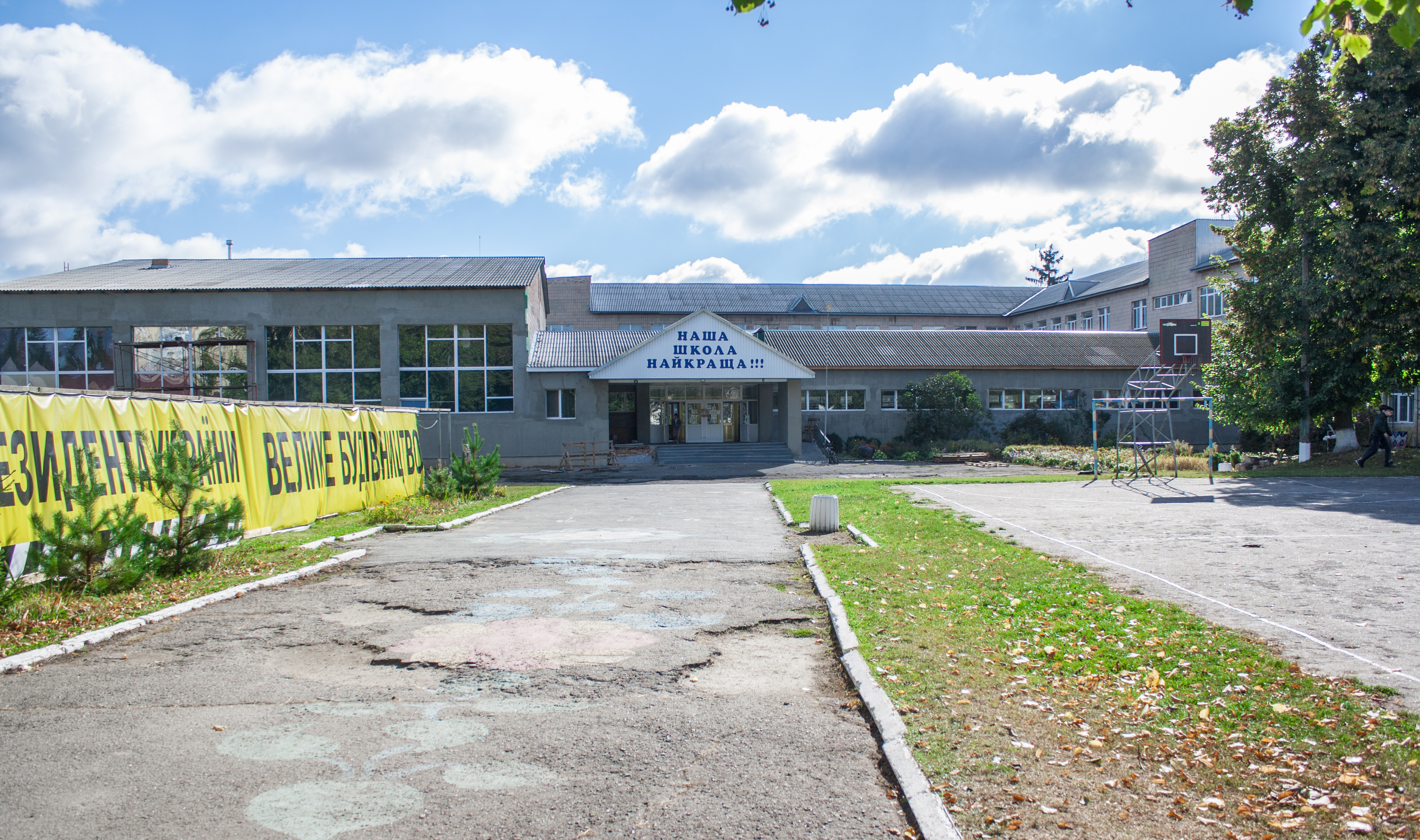
School No. 1

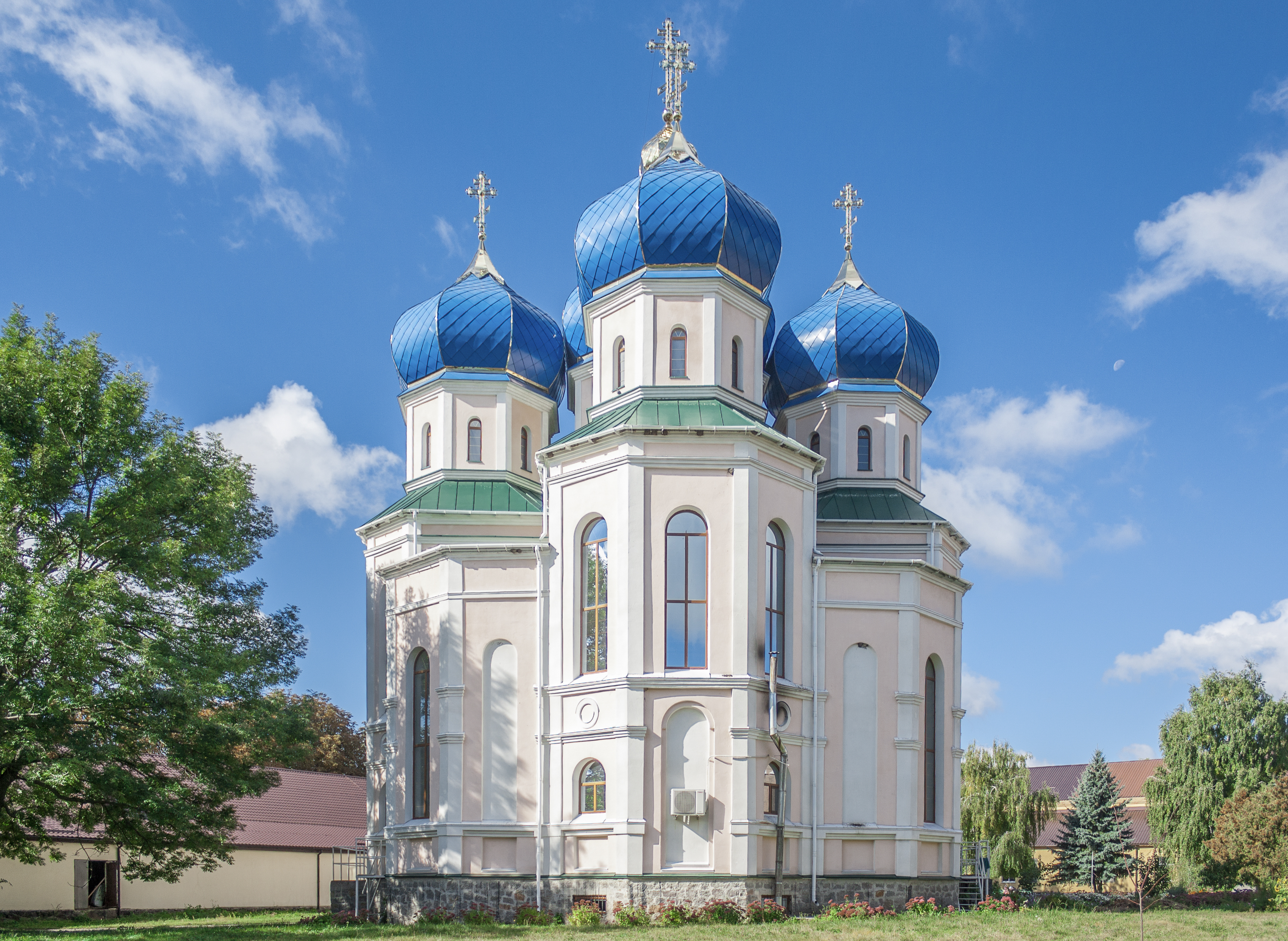
Church
