= Horodyshche =

City in Cherkasy Oblast, Ukraine

Horodyshche Городище
- City
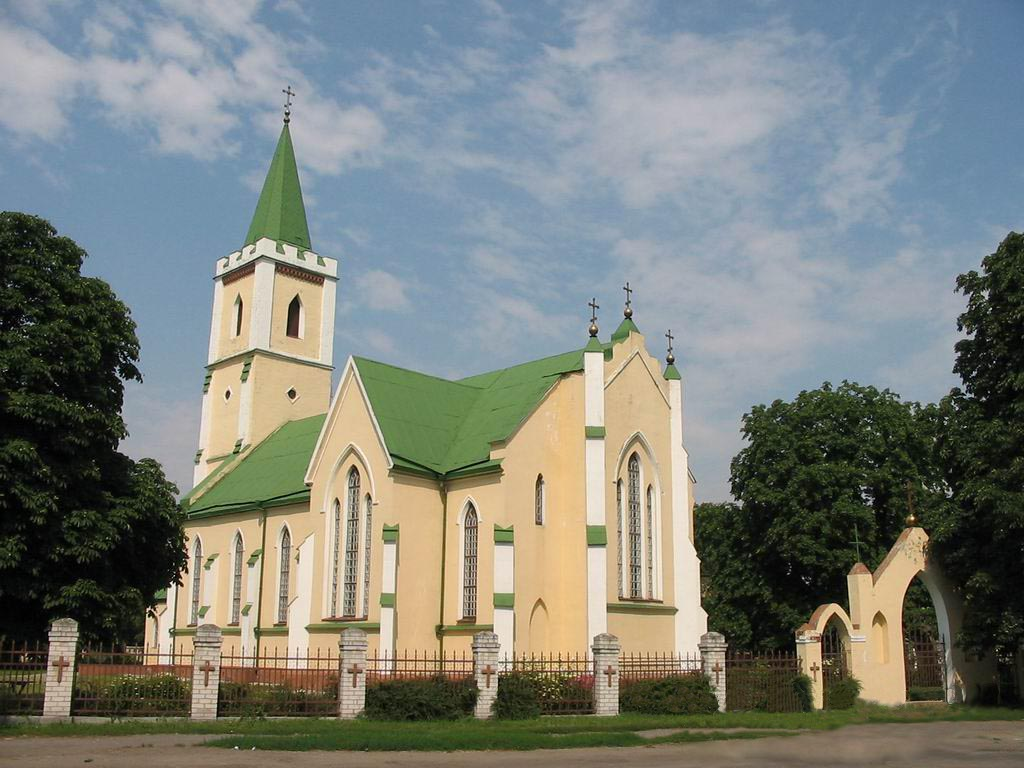
- St. Michael's Church (1844)

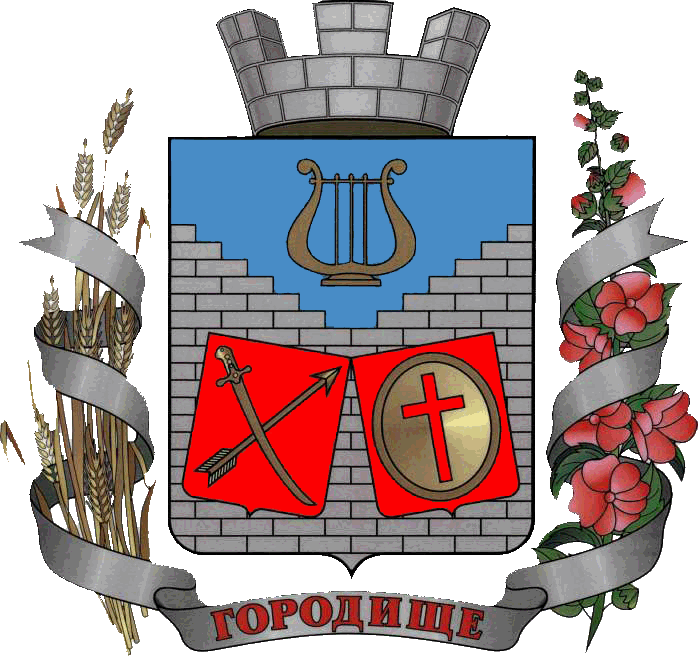
- Flag Coat of arms

- Location of Horodysche Horodyshche (Ukraine)
- Coordinates: 49°17′33″N 31°27′29″E
- Country: Ukraine
- Oblast: Cherkasy Oblast
- Raion: Cherkasy Raion
- Hromada: Horodyshche urban hromada
- Founded: 1050

Population (2022)
  - Total: 13 062
- Postal code: 19500 — 19507
- Area code: +380 4734
- Website: Municipal website

Horodyshche (Ukrainian: Городище, IPA: [ɦoroˈdɪʃtʃe]) is a city in Cherkasy Raion of Cherkasy Oblast (province) in central Ukraine on the Vilshanka River, where the administration of Horodyshche urban hromada (municipality). The population is 13,062 (2022 estimate).

== History ==
A local newspaper has been published there since 1930.

It was occupied by German forces during World War II from the summer of 1941 until 1944.

It has been a city since 1956.

In January 1989 the population was 17,109. In January 2013 the population of the city was 14,291.

Until 18 July 2020, Horodyshche was an administrative center of Horodyshche Raion. The raion was abolished in July 2020 as part of the administrative reform of Ukraine, which reduced the number of raions of Cherkasy Oblast to four. The area of Horodyshche Raion was split between Cherkasy and Zvenyhorodka Raions, with Horodyshche being transferred to Cherkasy Raion.

== Economy and education ==
Horodyshche is known as a centre of sugar industry and vegetable conservation. The town also houses an agricultural technical school.

== Notable people ==
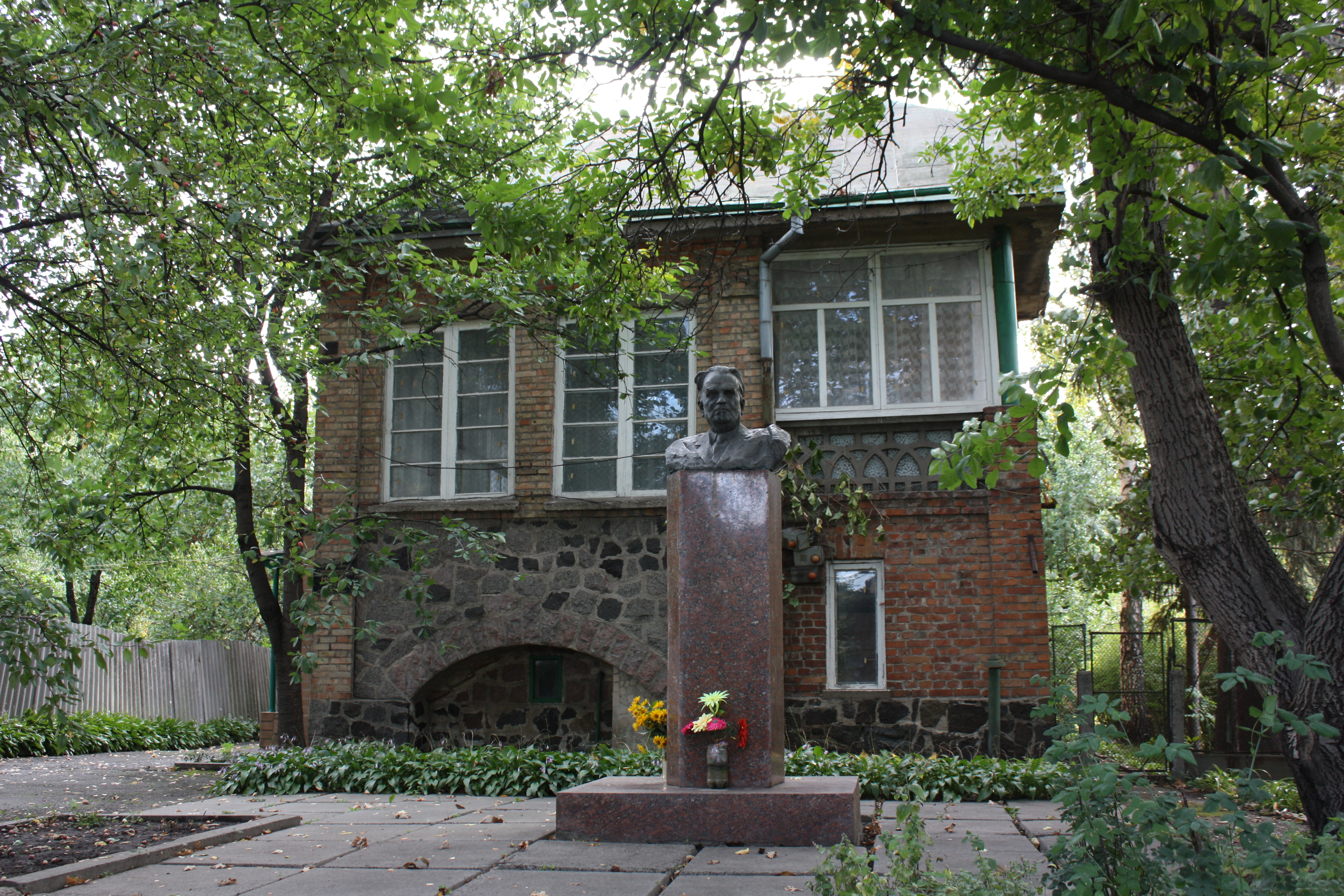
House of Ivan Le in Horodyshche

- Petro Hulak-Artemovsky (1790-1865), Ukrainian poet and fabulist
- Semen Hulak-Artemovsky (1813–1873), singer and composer of Ukrainian opera; there is a museum in Horodyshche dedicated to his life and work.
- Ivan Le (1895–1978), Ukrainian Soviet author, lived here.
- Jacob Lestschinsky (1876–1966), Jewish sociologist and journalist.
- Georgy Pyatakov (1890–1937), Bolshevik revolutionary
