= Cherkasy Oblast =

Oblast (region) of Ukraine

Coordinates: 49°26′41″N 32°03′37″E

Cherkasy Oblast Черкаська область
- Oblast
- Cherkaska oblast
- Flag Coat of arms
- Nickname: Шевченків край (Shevchenko's Land)
- Country: Ukraine
- Established: January 7, 1954
- Administrative center: Cherkasy
- Largest cities: Cherkasy, Uman, Smila, Zolotonosha

Government
  - Governor: Ihor Taburets
  - Oblast council: 84 seats
  - Chairperson: Anatoliy Pidhornyy

Area
  - Total: 20,903 km^{2} (8,071 sq mi)
  - Rank: Ranked 18th

Population (2022)
  - Total: 1,160,744 ▼
  - Rank: Ranked 15th
  - Density: 55.530/km^{2} (143.82/sq mi)

GDP
  - Total: ₴ 131 billion (€3.4 billion)
  - Per capita: ₴ 112,145 (€2,900)
- Time zone: UTC+2 (EET)
  - Summer (DST): UTC+3 (EEST)
- Postal code: 18-20xxx
- Area code: +380 47
- ISO 3166 code: UA-71
- Vehicle registration: CA
- Raions: 4
- Hromadas: 66
- HDI (2022): 0.727 high
- FIPS 10-4: UP01
- NUTS statistical regions of Ukraine: UA62
- Website: www.oda.ck.ua www.rada.gov.ua

Cherkasy Oblast, (Note: Ukrainian: Черкаська область, romanized: Čerkaśka oblasť, IPA: [tʃerˈkɑsʲkɐ ˈɔblɐsʲtʲ]) also referred to as Cherkashchyna, (Note: Ukrainian: Черкащина, romanized: Čerkaščyna, IPA: [tʃerˈkɑʃtʃɪnɐ]) is an oblast (province) in central Ukraine located along the Dnieper River. The administrative center of the oblast is the city of Cherkasy. The current population of the oblast is 1,160,744 (2022 estimate).

== Nomenclature ==
Most of Ukraine's oblasts are named after their capital cities, officially referred to as "oblast centers" (Ukrainian: обласний центр, romanized: oblasnyi tsentr). The name of each oblast is a relative adjective, formed by adding a feminine suffix to the name of respective center city: Cherkasy is the center of the Cherkaska oblast (Cherkasy Oblast). Most oblasts are also sometimes referred to in a feminine noun form, following the convention of traditional regional place names, ending with the suffix "-shchyna", as is the case with the Cherkasy Oblast, Cherkashchyna.

== Geography ==
Spanning 20,900 square kilometres (8,100 sq mi), Cherkasy Oblast is the 18th largest oblast of Ukraine, comprising about 3.5% of the area of the country. The south flowing Dnieper River with the hilly western bank and the plain eastern bank divides the oblast into two unequal parts. The larger western part belongs to the Dnieper Upland. The low-lying eastern part of the oblast used to be subject to the frequent Dnieper flooding before the flow of the river became controlled by multiple dams of Hydroelectric Power Plants constructed along the river in the 20th century.

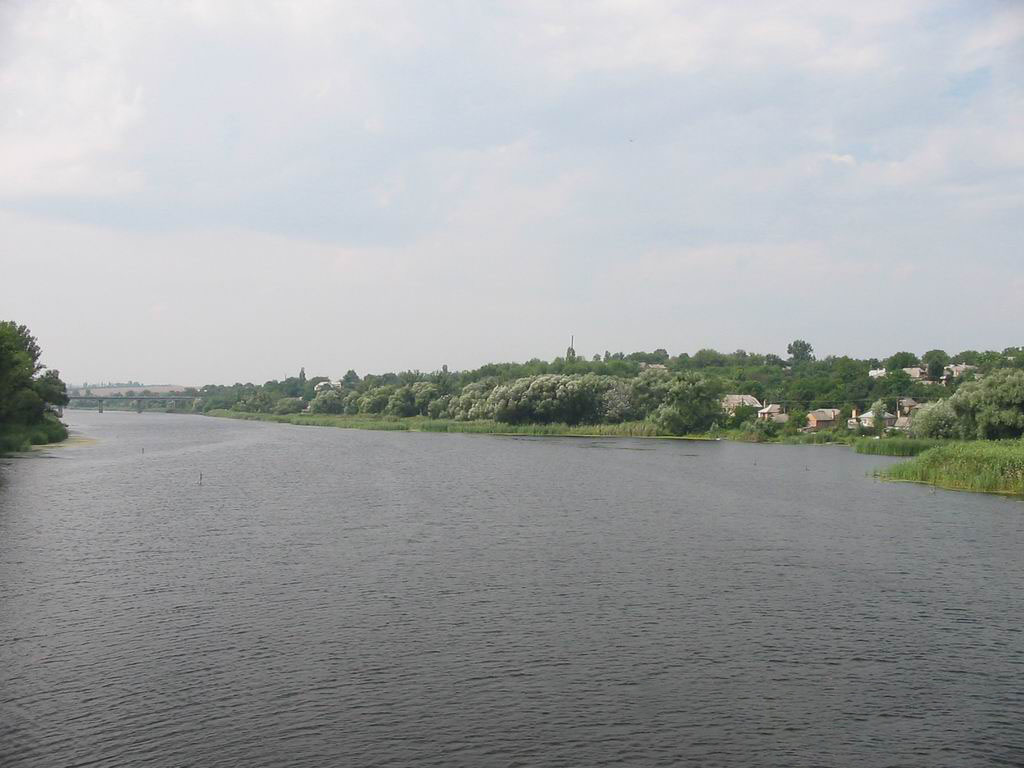
The Ros River near Korsun-Shevchenkivskyi.

The oblast extends for 245 km from south-west to north-east, and for 150 km from north to south. The northernmost point of the oblast is located is near the village of Kononivka in Zolotonosha Raion (district), the southernmost point near the village of Kolodyste in Zvenyhorodka Raion, the westernmost point near the village of Korytnya in Uman Raion, and the easternmost point near the village of Stetsivka in Cherkasy Raion. The geometric centre of the oblast is located near the village Zhuravky of Horodyshche Raion. The oblast borders Kyiv Oblast to the north, Kirovohrad Oblast to the south, Poltava Oblast to the east, and Vinnytsia Oblast to the west.

== History ==
The oblast's territory was the major cities of Cherkasy, Smila and Uman, their corresponding raions (districts), as well as 30 former raions of the Vinnytsia, Kyiv, Kirovohrad and Poltava Oblasts.

Archaeological discoveries have shown that people have inhabited the valley of the Dnieper River since time immemorial. The oldest objects excavated on the territory of the region date back to the Stone Age – the Palaeolithic period.

== Demographics ==
Historical population
Year	Pop.	±%
1970	1,534,993	—
1979	1,547,197	+0.8%
1989	1,531,527	−1.0%
2001	1,402,969	−8.4%
2011	1,285,384	−8.4%
2022	1,160,744	−9.7%

The current estimated population is 1,335,064 (as of 2006).

According to the 2001 Ukrainian census, the oblast's population is almost equally divided between the urban and rural areas (53.7% and 46.3%, respectively). The demographic situation in this largely agricultural territory is somewhat complicated by population ageing.

According to the 2001 Ukrainian census, ethnic Ukrainians accounted for 93.1% of the population of Cherkasy Oblast, and ethnic Russians for 5.4%.

=== Language ===
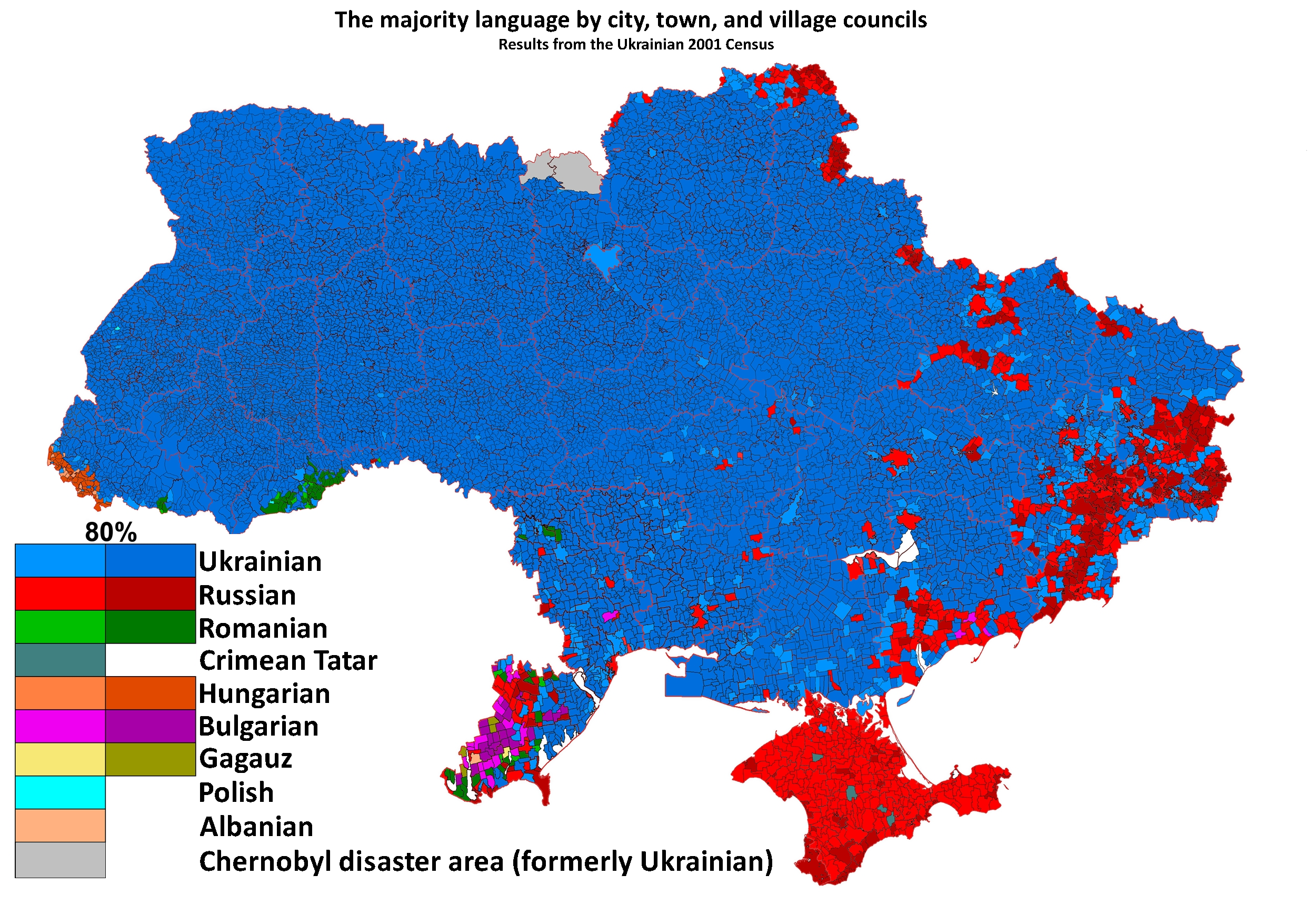
According to the 2001 Ukrainian census, Ukrainian was the native language for over 92% of Cherkasy Oblast's population: it was the dominant language in all of the city, town, and village councils of the oblast.

Due to the Russification of Ukraine during the Soviet era, the share of Ukrainian speakers in the population of Cherkasy Oblast gradually decreased, while the share of Russian speakers increased. Native language of the population of Cherkasy Oblast according to the results of population censuses:

	1959	1970	1989	2001
Ukrainian	93.0%	92.3%	89.1%	92.5%
Russian	6.3%	7.2%	10.3%	6.7%
Other	0.7%	0.5%	0.6%	0.4%

Native language of the population of the raions, cities and city councils of Cherkasy Oblast according to the 2001 Ukrainian census:

	Ukrainian	Russian
Cherkasy Oblast	92.5%	6.7%
Cherkasy (city council)	79.1%	18.7%
Vatutine (city council)	91.9%	7.8%
Zolotonosha (city council)	92.8%	6.3%
Smila (city council)	89.1%	10.1%
City of Kaniv	88.4%	11.2%
City of Uman	93.3%	6.4%
Horodyshche Raion	97.6%	2.0%
Drabiv Raion	98.0%	1.6%
Zhashkiv Raion	98.1%	1.5%
Zvenyhorodka Raion (in pre-2020 borders)	97.6%	2.0%
Zolotonosha Raion (in pre-2020 borders)	96.5%	3.0%
Kamianka Raion	96.8%	3.0%
Kaniv Raion	96.9%	2.7%
Katerynopil Raion	98.0%	1.6%
Korsun-Shevchenkivskyi Raion	96.6%	2.5%
Lysianka Raion	98.3%	1.4%
Mankivka Raion	98.1%	1.6%
Monastyryshche Raion	98.4%	1.3%
Smila Raion	97.0%	2.7%
Talne Raion	97.7%	1.8%
Uman Raion (in pre-2020 borders)	97.3%	2.2%
Khrystynivka Raion	97.1%	2.3%
Cherkasy Raion (in pre-2020 borders)	96.8%	2.9%
Chyhyryn Raion	95.5%	3.6%
Chornobai Raion	97.3%	2.3%
Shpola Raion	97.7%	1.8%

Ukrainian is the only official language on the whole territory of Cherkasy Oblast.

According to a poll conducted by Rating from 16 November to 10 December 2018 as part of the project «Portraits of Regions», 85% of the residents of Cherkasy Oblast believed that the Ukrainian language should be the only state language on the entire territory of Ukraine. 8% believed that Ukrainian should be the only state language, while Russian should be the second official language in some regions of the country. 4% believed that Russian should become the second state language of the country. 3% found it difficult to answer.

On 4 June 2021, Cherkasy Oblast Council approved the «Comprehensive Programme for the Development and Functioning of the Ukrainian Language in All Spheres of Public Life in Cherkasy Oblast for 2021—2025», the main objective of which is to strengthen the positions of the Ukrainian language in various spheres of public life in the oblast.

According to the research of the Content Analysis Centre, conducted from 15 August to 15 September 2024, the topic of which was the ratio of Ukrainian and Russian languages in the Ukrainian segment of social media, 84.3% of posts from Cherkasy Oblast were written in Ukrainian (80.3% in 2023, 75.9% in 2022, 26.7% in 2020), while 15.7% were written in Russian (19.7% in 2023, 24.1% in 2022, 73.3% in 2020).

After Ukraine declared independence in 1991, Cherkasy Oblast, as well as Ukraine as a whole, experienced a gradual Ukrainization of the education system, which had been Russified during the Soviet era. Dynamics of the ratio of the languages of instruction in general secondary education institutions in Cherkasy Oblast:

Language of instruction, % of pupils	1991— 1992	1992— 1993	1993— 1994	1994— 1995	1995— 1996	2000— 2001	2005— 2006	2007— 2008	2010— 2011	2012— 2013	2015— 2016	2018— 2019	2021— 2022	2022— 2023
Ukrainian	75.8%	78.3%	81.5%	83.8%	86.0%	96.0%	98.0%	99.0%	99.0%	99.0%	99.0%	99.0%	99.87%	100.0%
Russian	24.2%	21.7%	18.5%	16.2%	14.0%	4.0%	2.0%	1.0%	1.0%	1.0%	1.0%	1.0%	0.13%	—

According to the State Statistics Service of Ukraine, in the 2023—2024 school year, all 114,960 pupils in general secondary education institutions in Cherkasy Oblast were studying in classes where Ukrainian was the language of instruction.

=== Age structure ===
0-14 years: 13.4% (male 87,557/female 82,340)
15-64 years: 69.1% ▼ (male 417,426/female 457,390)
65 years and over: 17.5% (male 72,835/female 147,711) (2013 official)

=== Median age ===
total: 41.7 years ▲
male: 38.4 years ▲
female: 45.0 years ▲ (2013 official)

== Administrative divisions ==
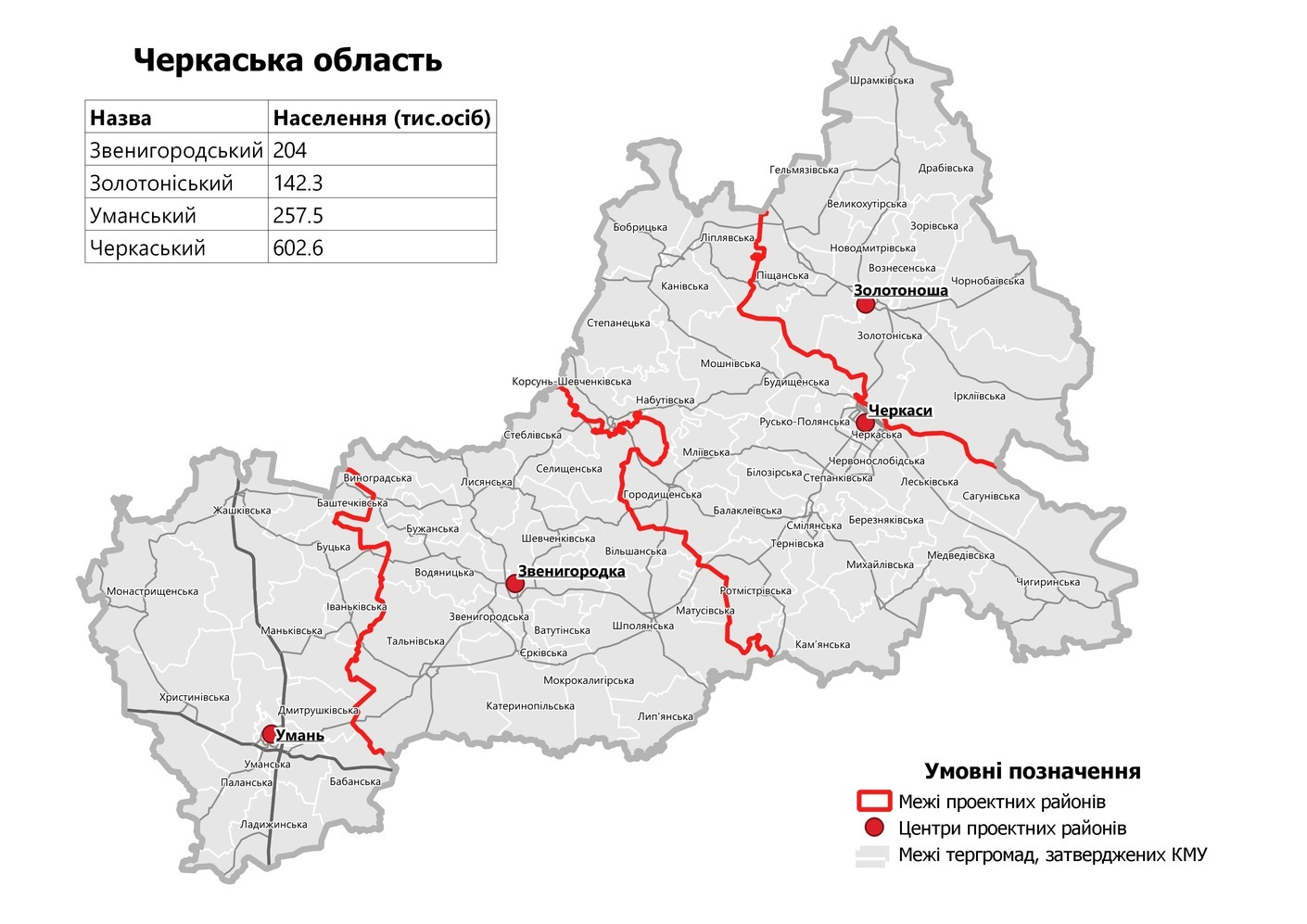
Administrative divisions of Cherkasy Oblast

Since July 2020, Cherkasy Oblast is administratively subdivided into 4 raions (districts). These are further divided into 66 hromadas (communities).

The following data incorporates the number of each type of administrative divisions of Cherkasy Oblast:

- Administrative Center — 1 (Cherkasy)
- Raions — 4
- Hromadas — 66, including:
  - Urban hromadas — 16
  - Settlement hromadas — 10
  - Rural hromadas — 40

The local administration of the oblast is controlled by the Cherkasy Oblast Rada. The governor of the oblast is the Cherkasy Oblast Rada speaker, appointed by the President of Ukraine.

Since July 2020, Cherkasy Oblast consists of four raions:

Flag	Coat of arms	Name	Ukrainian Name	Administrative center	Area (km^{2})	Population estimate 2021
		Cherkasy Raion	Черкаський район	Cherkasy	6,878.0	583,648
Uman raion		Uman Raion	Уманський район	Uman	4,528.3	247,847
		Zolotonosha Raion	Золотоніський район	Zolotonosha	4,246.1	135,445
		Zvenyhorodka Raion	Звенигородський район	Zvenyhorodka	5,278.5	193,804
		Total Oblast	Черкаська область	Cherkasy	20,903	1,160,744

The region has 16 populated places designated as cities (towns). The only one with the population over 100 thousand is Cherkasy. Uman and Smila are in the range between 80 and 90 thousands, and all others are below 30 thousands.

== Economy ==
The economy of the Cherkasy Oblast is largely dominated by agriculture. While the winter wheat and sugar beets are the main products grown in the oblast, barley, corn, tobacco and hemp are also grown. Cattle breeding is also important.

The industry is mainly concentrated in Cherkasy, the oblast's capital and the largest city. A chemical industry was developed in the city in late 1960s in addition to machine building, furniture making and agricultural processing.

== Education ==
There are 5 universities in the region:

- The Bohdan Khmelnytsky National University of Cherkasy
- Cherkasy State Technological University
- Uman National University Of Horticulture
- Pavlo Tychyna Uman State Pedagogical University
- East European University of Economics and Management (private)

== Attractions ==
- Sofiivka
- Fatherland of Taras Shevchenko
- Trypillian culture
- Shevchenko National preserve
- Martynivka Treasure housed in Kyiv

== Gallery ==
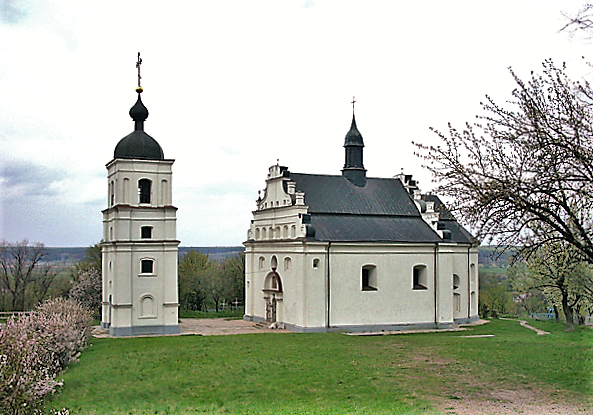
A church in Subotiv near Chyhyryn, the birthplace of Ukrainian Hetman Bohdan Khmelnytsky

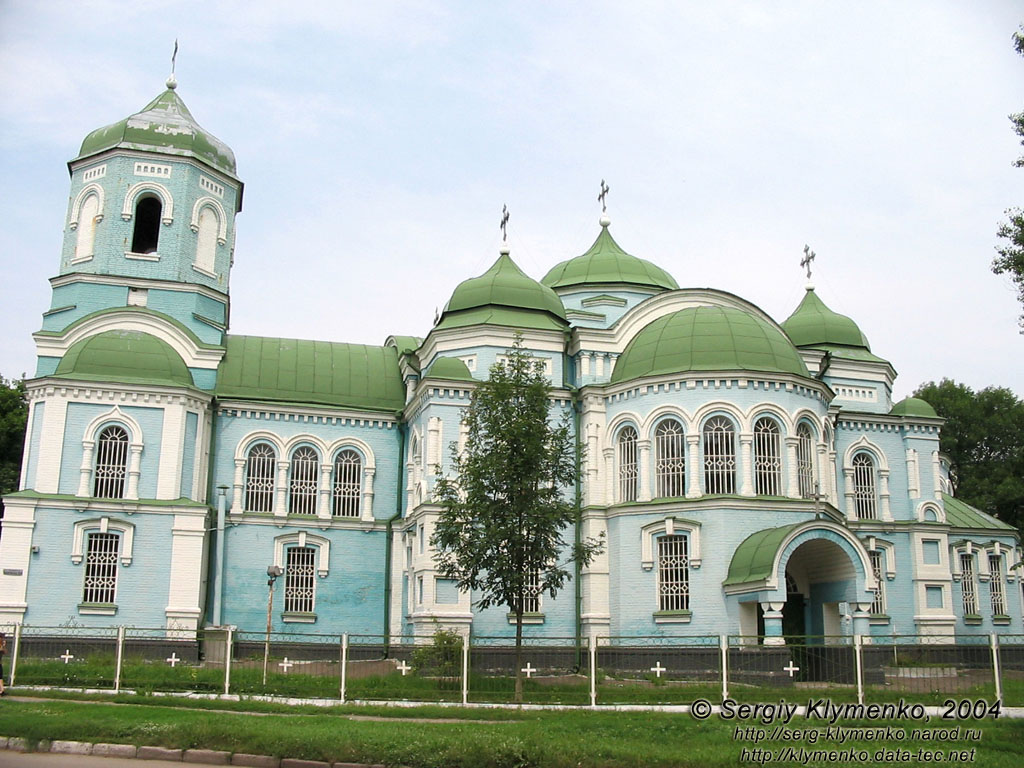
The Holy Dormition Cathedral in Zolotonosha

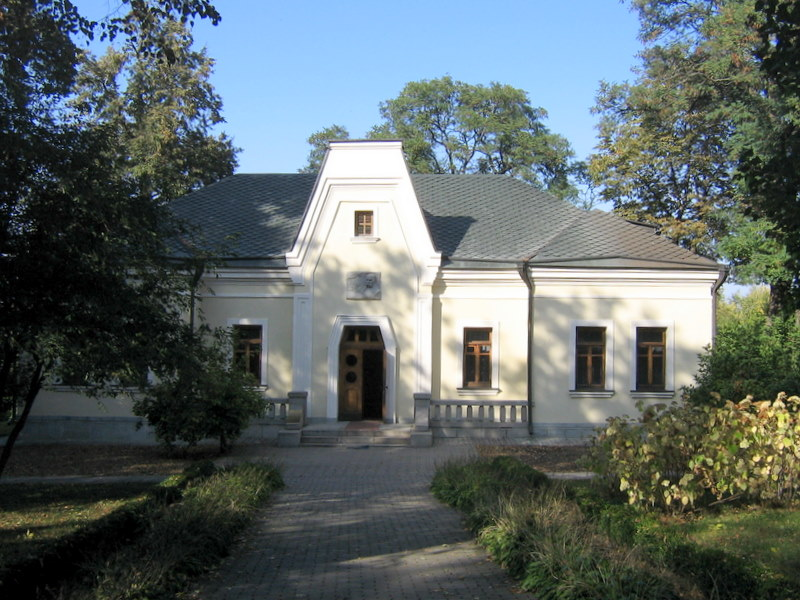
Museum of Taras Shevchenko

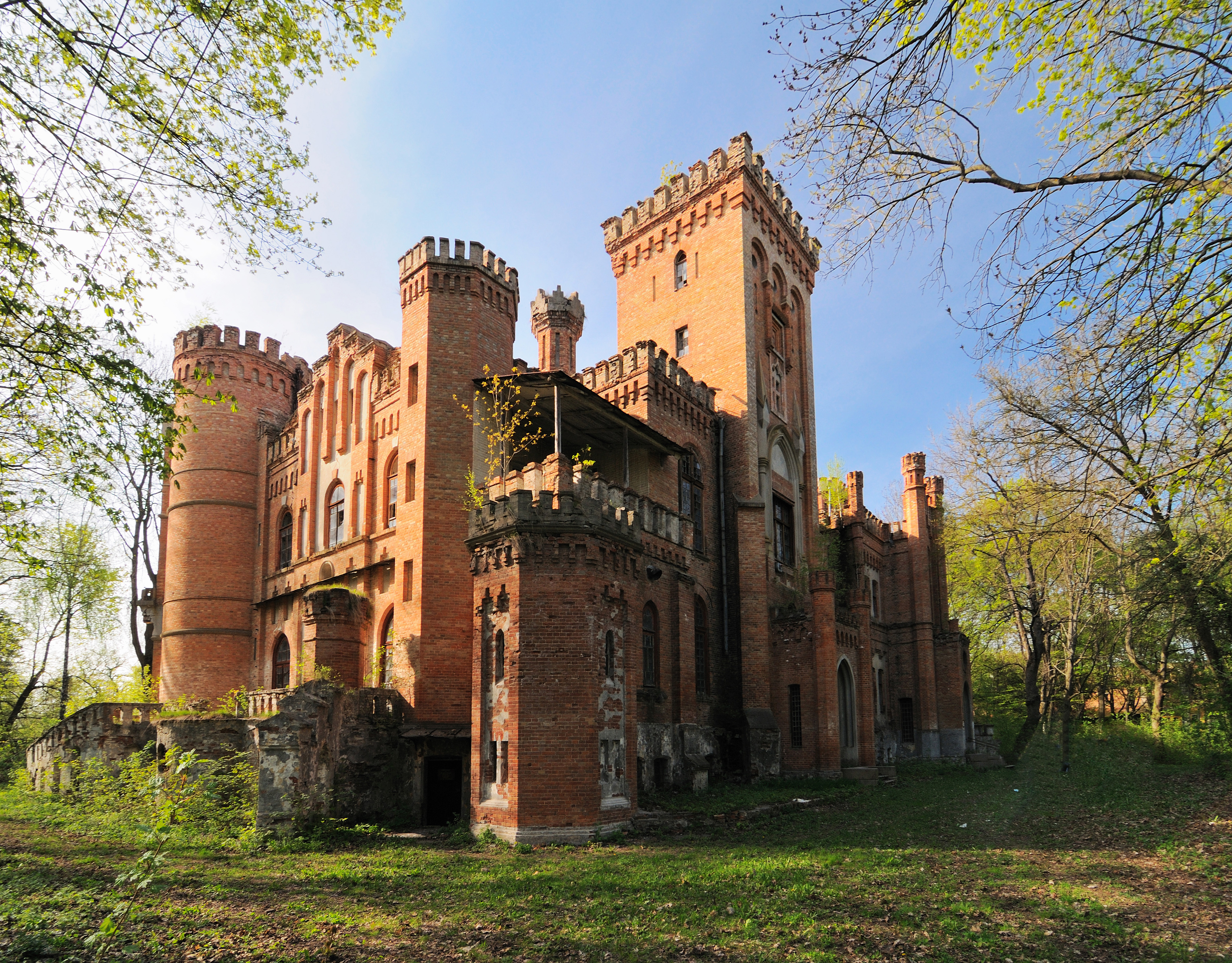
Leskove Palace

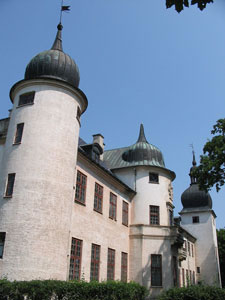
Hunting castle, Talne

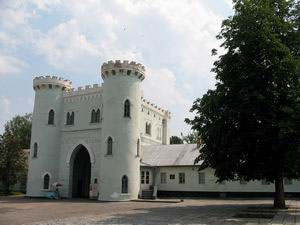
Lopukhin-Demidov princes palace in Korsun-Shevchenkivskyi

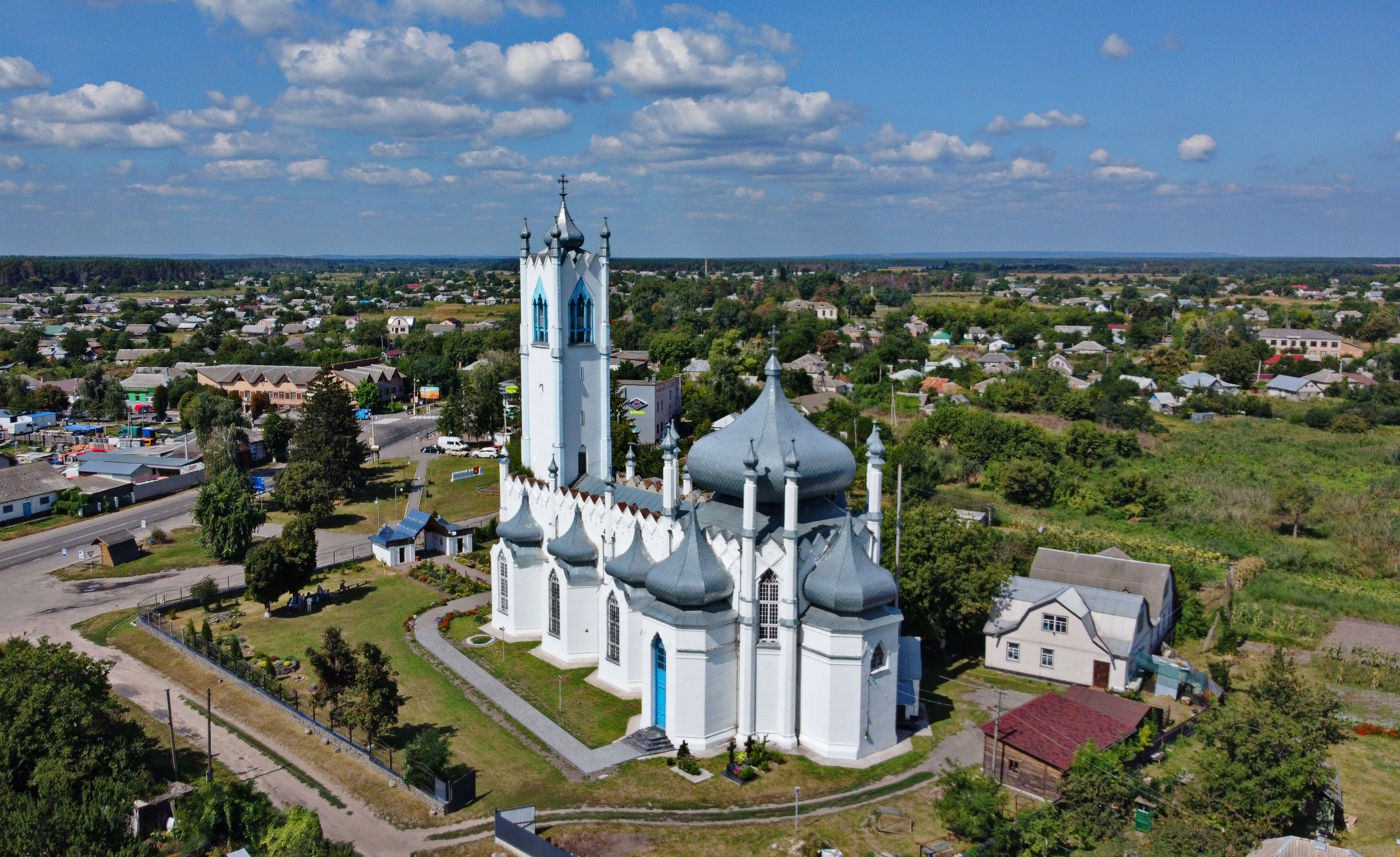
Transfiguration Church in Moshny

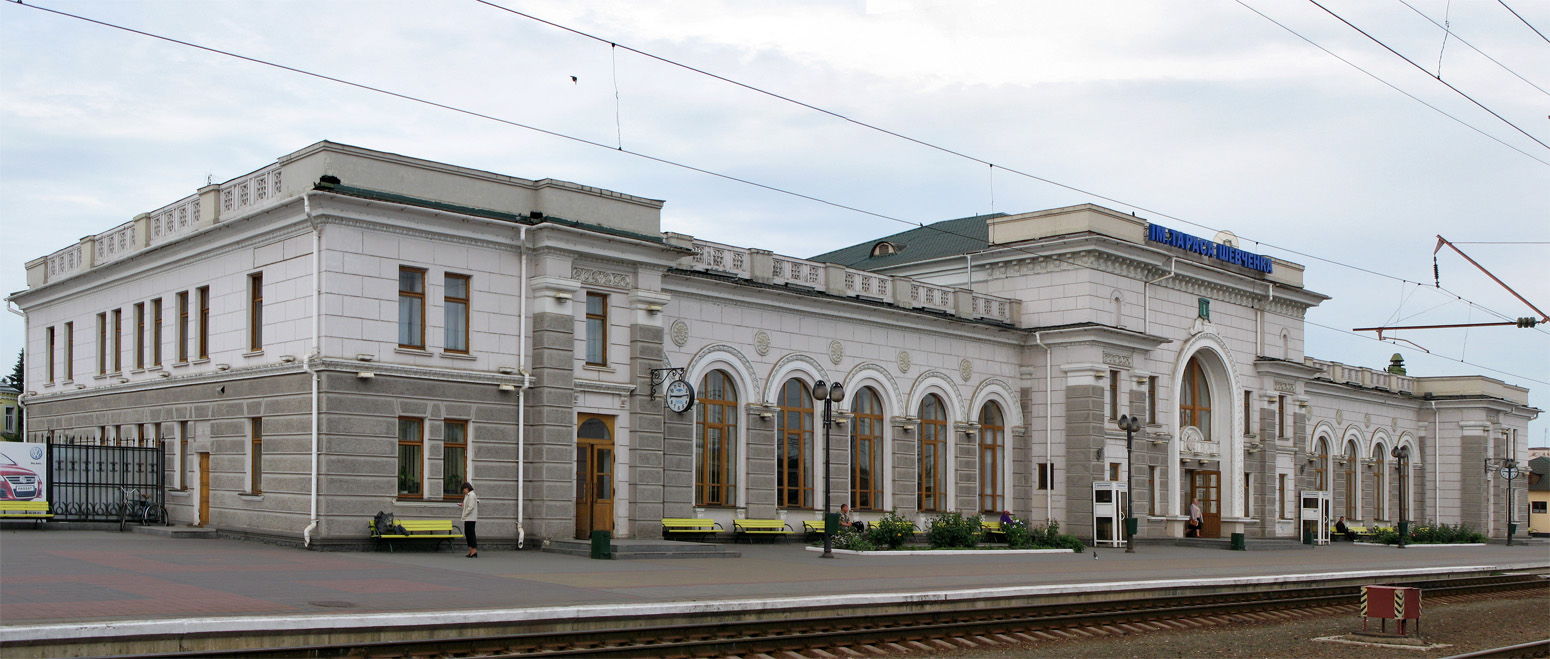
Station named after Taras Shevchenko

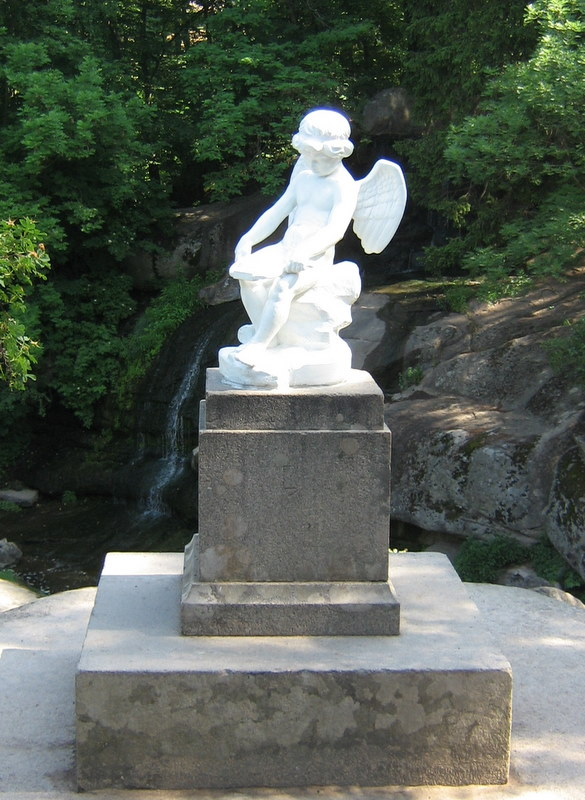
Arboretum "Sofiivka", Uman

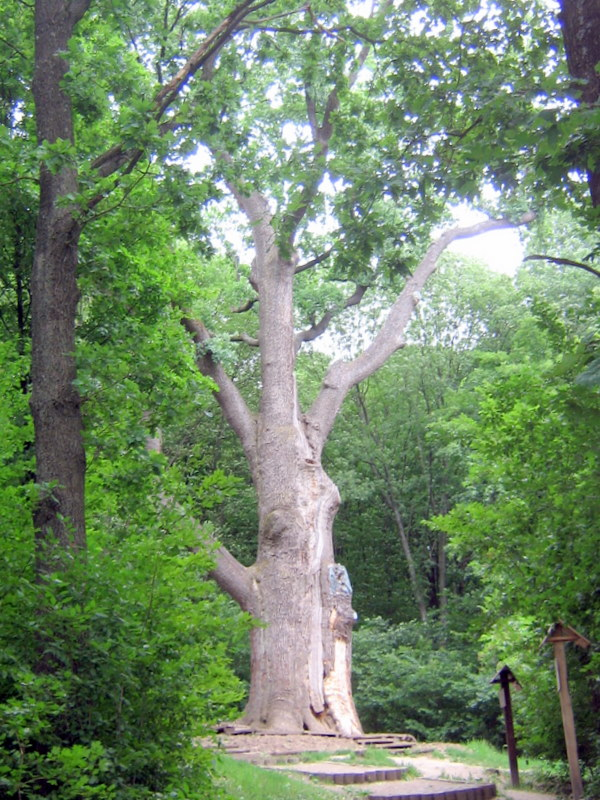
Zalizniak's Oak

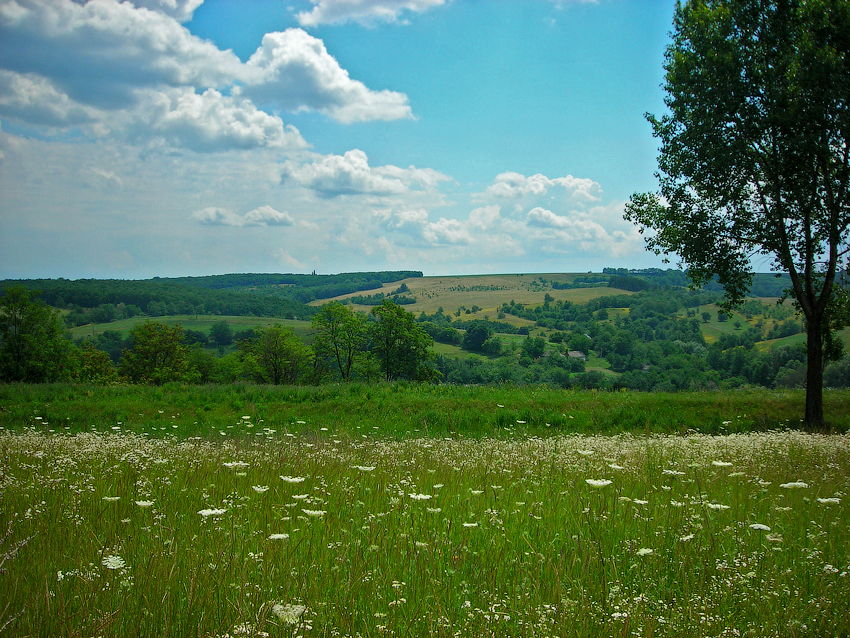
Kholodnyi Yar National Nature Park

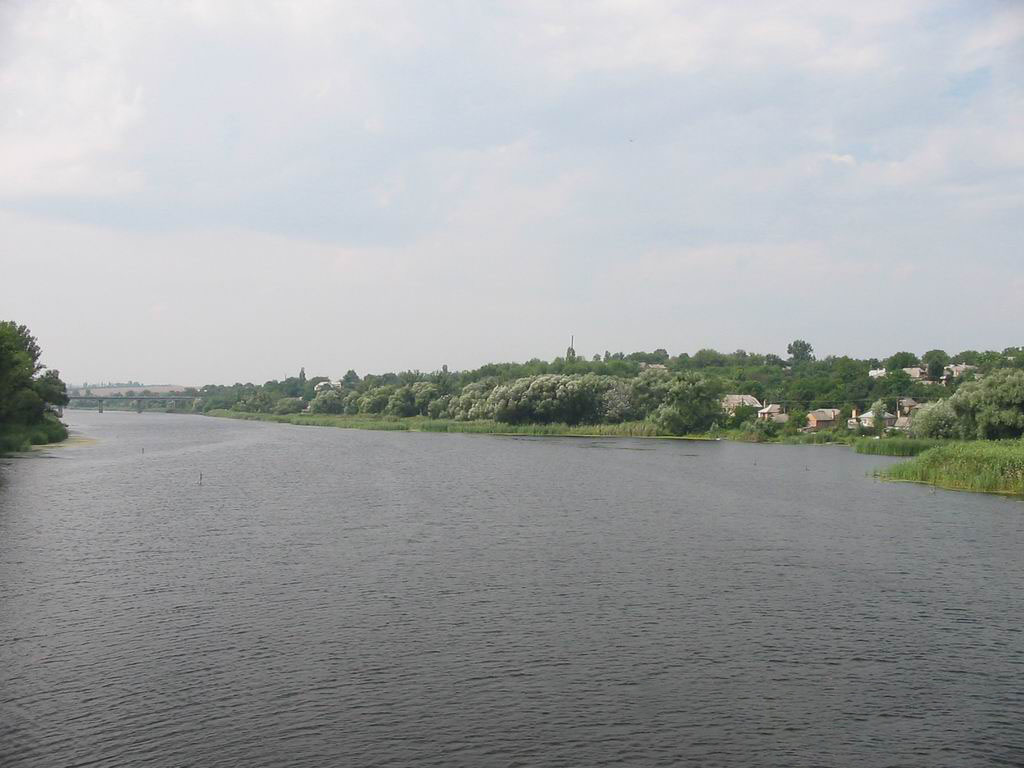
River near Korsun-Shevchenkivskyi

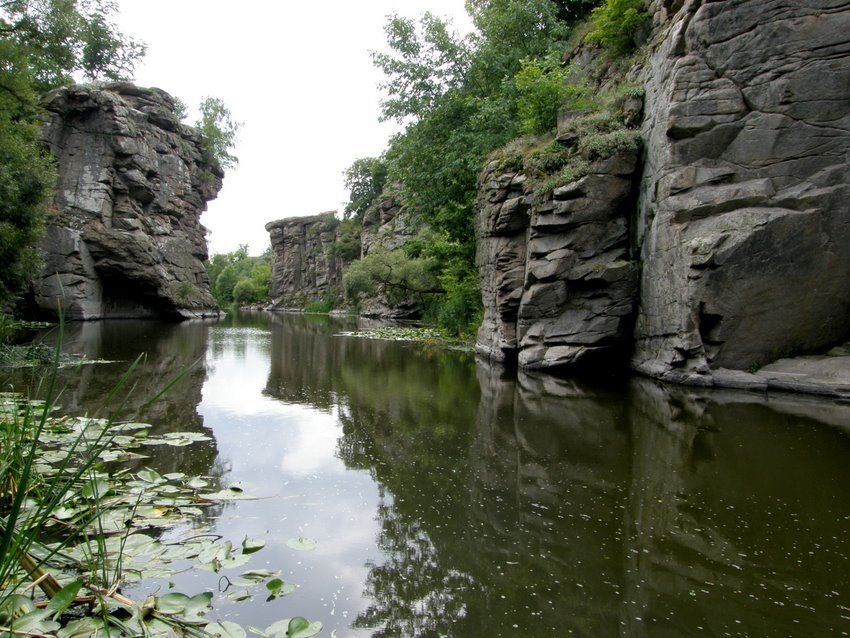
Buky Canyon

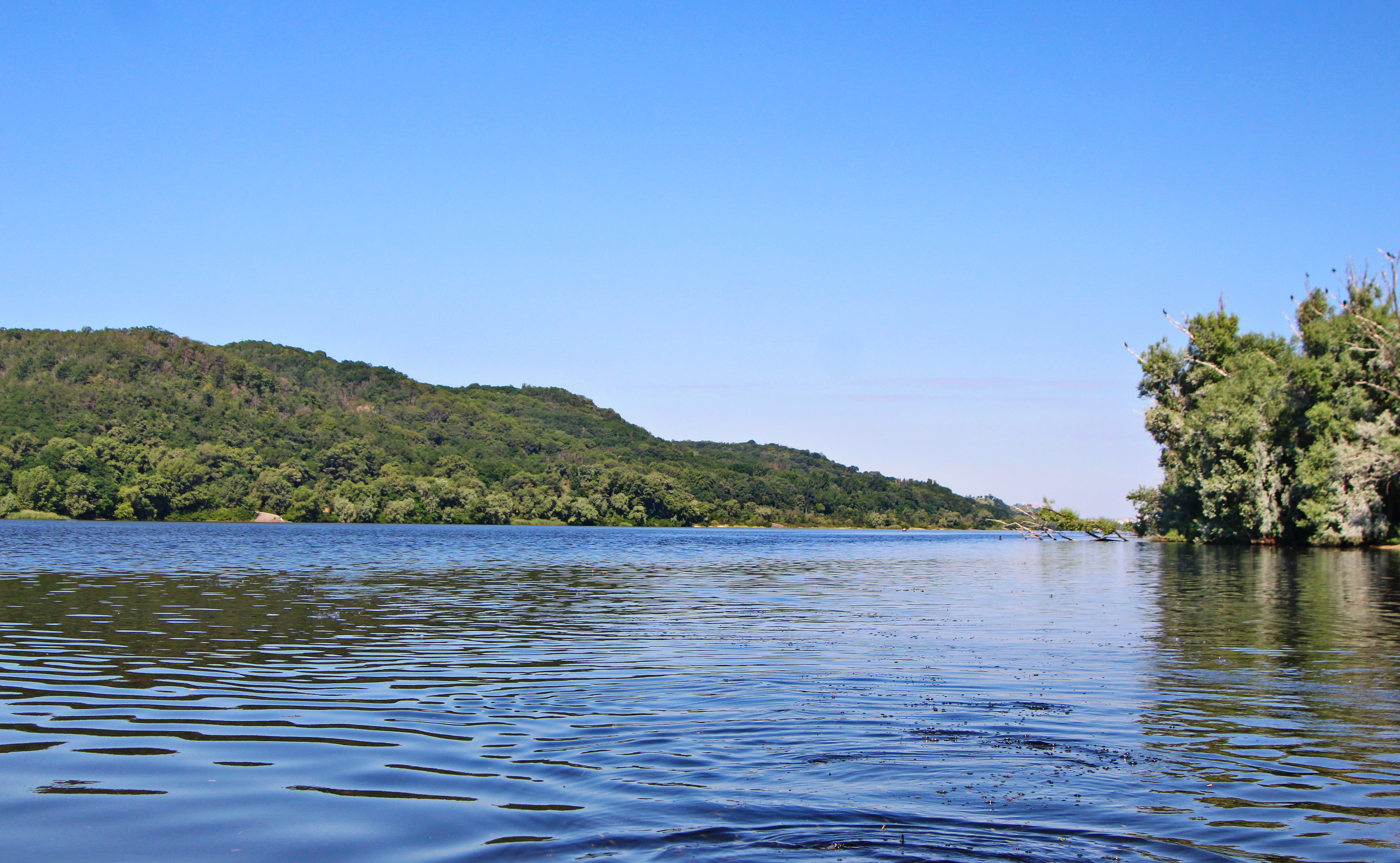
Kaniv Hills by the Dnieper

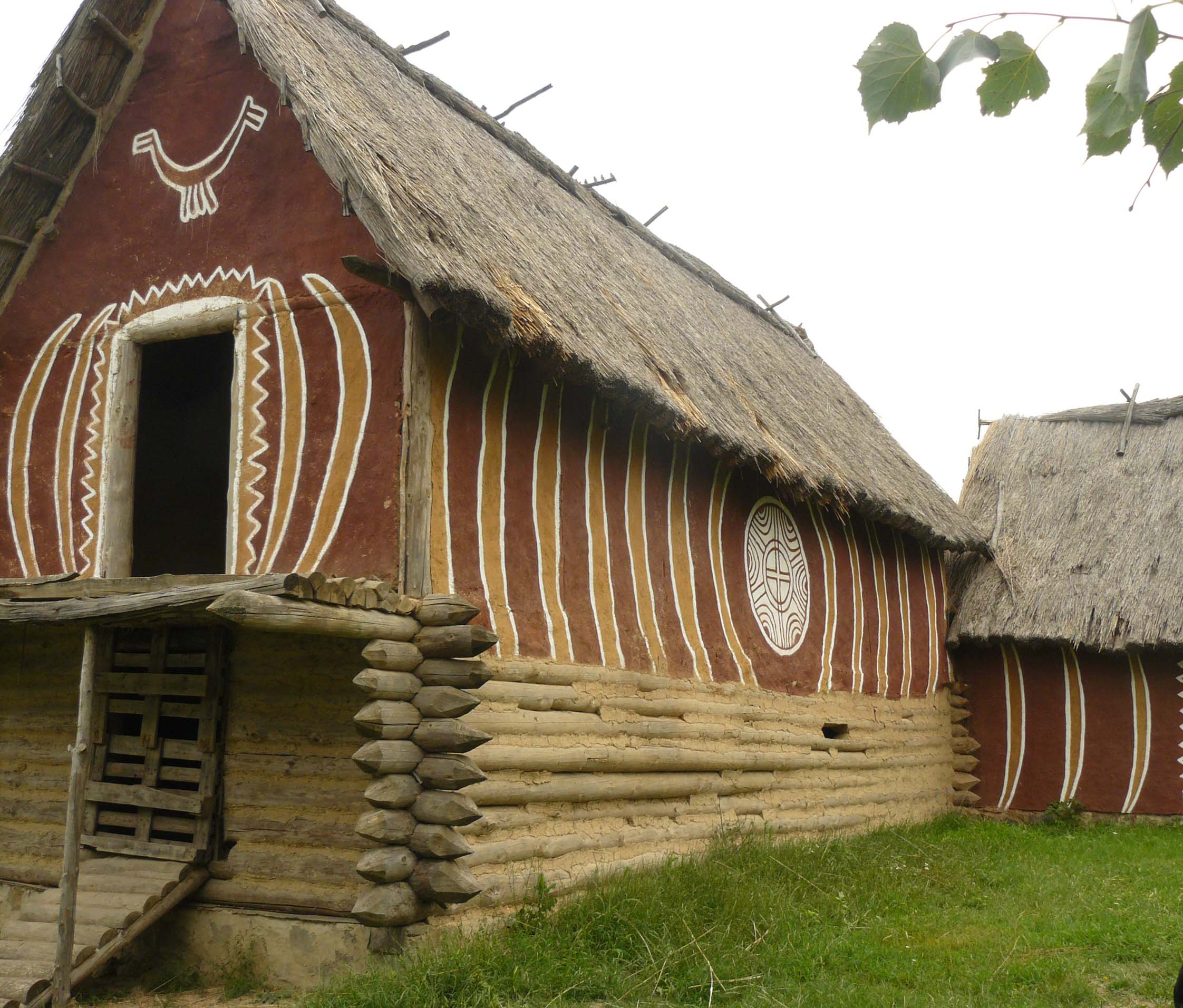
Reconstruction of a Trypillian house in Lehedzyne

== See also ==
- Administrative divisions of Ukraine
- Right and Left-bank Ukraine, historical region
