= Administrative divisions of Kharkiv Oblast =

Districts and community administration

Kharkiv Oblast is subdivided into districts (raions) which are further subdivided into territorial communities (hromadas).

== Current ==
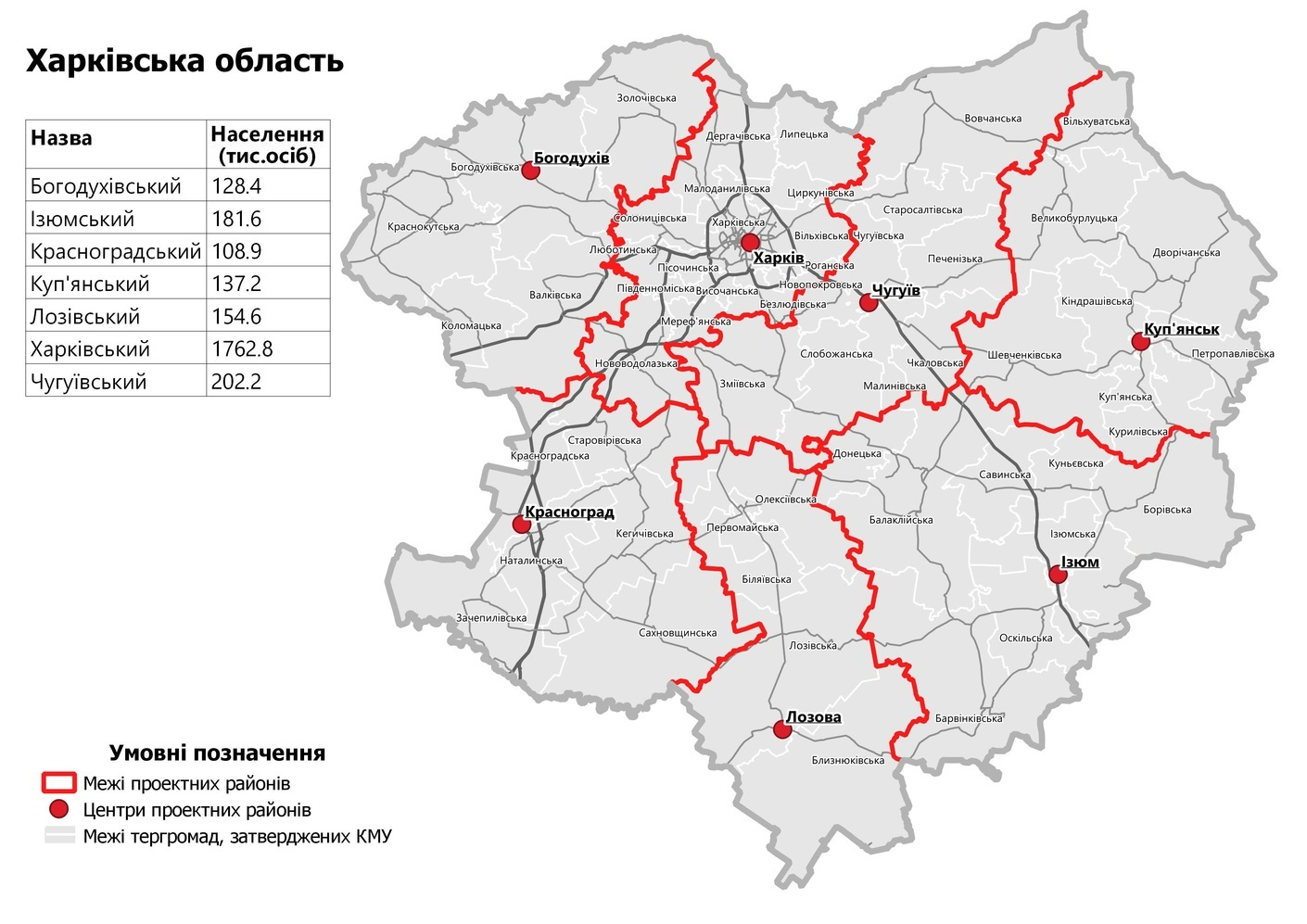
Raions of Kharkiv Oblast as of August 2020.

On 18 July 2020, the number of districts was reduced to seven. These are:

1. Berestyn (Берестинський район), the center is in the city of Berestyn;
2. Bohodukhiv (Богодухівський район), the center is in the city of Bohodukhiv;
3. Chuhuiv (Чугуївський район), the center is in the city of Chuhuiv;
4. Izium (Ізюмський район), the center is in the city of Izium;
5. Kharkiv (Харківський район), the center is in the city of Kharkiv;
6. Kupiansk (Куп’янський район), the center is in the city of Kupiansk;
7. Lozova (Лозівський район), the center is in the city of Lozova.

Kharkiv Oblast
As of January 1, 2022
Number of districts (райони)	7
Number of hromadas (громади)	56

== Administrative divisions until 2020 ==
Raions of Kharkiv Oblast prior to 2020. The city of Kharkiv is shown in dark blue.

Before July 2020, Kharkiv Oblast was subdivided into 32 regions: 25 districts (raions) and 7 city municipalities (mis'krada or misto), officially known as territories governed by city councils.

- Cities under the oblast's jurisdiction:
  - Kharkiv (Харків), the administrative center of the oblast
  - Chuhuiv Municipality
    - Cities under the city's jurisdiction:
      - Chuhuiv (Чугуїв)
  - Izium (Ізюм)
  - Kupiansk Municipality
    - Cities under the city's jurisdiction:
      - Kupiansk (Куп'янськ)
    - Urban-type settlements under the city's jurisdiction:
      - Kivsharivka (Ківшарівка)
      - Kupiansk-Vuzlovyi (Куп'янськ-Вузловий)
  - Lozova Municipality
    - Cities under the city's jurisdiction:
      - Lozova (Лозова)
    - Urban-type settlements under the city's jurisdiction:
      - Paniutyne (Панютине)
  - Liubotyn Municipality
    - Cities under the city's jurisdiction:
      - Liubotyn (Люботин)
  - Pervomaiskyi (Первомайський)
- Districts (raions):
  - Balakliia (Балаклійський район)
    - Cities under the district's jurisdiction:
      - Balakliia (Балаклія)
    - Urban-type settlements under the district's jurisdiction:
      - Andriivka (Андріївка)
      - Donets (Донець), formerly Chervonyi Donets
      - Savyntsi (Савинці)
  - Barvinkove (Барвінківський район)
    - Cities under the district's jurisdiction:
      - Barvinkove (Барвінкове)
  - Blyzniuky (Близнюківський район)
    - Urban-type settlements under the district's jurisdiction:
      - Blyzniuky (Близнюки)
  - Bohodukhiv (Богодухівський район)
    - Cities under the district's jurisdiction:
      - Bohodukhiv (Богодухів)
    - Urban-type settlements under the district's jurisdiction:
      - Huty (Гути)
      - Sharivka (Шарівка)
  - Borova (Борівський район)
    - Urban-type settlements under the district's jurisdiction:
      - Borova (Борова)
  - Chuhuiv (Чугуївський район)
    - Urban-type settlements under the district's jurisdiction:
      - Chkalovske (Чкаловське)
      - Eskhar (Есхар)
      - Kochetok (Кочеток)
      - Malynivka (Малинівка)
      - Novopokrovka (Новопокровка)
      - Vvedenka (Введенка)
  - Derhachi (Дергачівський район)
    - Cities under the district's jurisdiction:
      - Derhachi (Дергачі)
    - Urban-type settlements under the district's jurisdiction:
      - Kozacha Lopan (Козача Лопань)
      - Mala Danylivka (Мала Данилівка)
      - Peresichne (Пересічне)
      - Prudianka (Прудянка)
      - Slatyne (Слатине)
      - Solonytsivka (Солоницівка)
      - Vilshany (Вільшани)
  - Dvorichna (Дворічанський район)
    - Urban-type settlements under the district's jurisdiction:
      - Dvorichna (Дворічна)
  - Izium (Ізюмський район)
  - Kehychivka (Кегичівський район)
    - Urban-type settlements under the district's jurisdiction:
      - Kehychivka (Кегичівка)
      - Slobozhanske (Слобожанське), formerly Chapaeve
  - Kharkiv (Харківський район)
    - Cities under the district's jurisdiction:
      - Merefa (Мерефа)
      - Pivdenne (Південне)
    - Urban-type settlements under the district's jurisdiction:
      - Babai (Бабаї)
      - Berezivka (Березівка)
      - Bezliudivka (Безлюдівка)
      - Budy (Буди)
      - Khorosheve (Хорошеве)
      - Korotych (Коротич)
      - Kulynychi (Кулиничі)
      - Manchenky (Манченки)
      - Pisochyn (Пісочин)
      - Pokotylivka (Покотилівка)
      - Rohan (Рогань)
      - Utkivka (Утківка)
      - Vasyshcheve (Васищеве)
      - Vysokyi (Високий)
  - Kolomak (Коломацький район)
    - Urban-type settlements under the district's jurisdiction:
      - Kolomak (Коломак)
  - Krasnohrad (Красноградський район)
    - Cities under the district's jurisdiction:
      - Krasnohrad (Красноград)
  - Krasnokutsk (Краснокутський район)
    - Urban-type settlements under the district's jurisdiction:
      - Kostiantynivka (Костянтинівка)
      - Krasnokutsk (Краснокутськ)
  - Kupiansk (Куп'янський район)
  - Lozova (Лозівський район)
    - Urban-type settlements under the district's jurisdiction:
      - Krasnopavlivka (Краснопавлівка)
      - Orilka (Орілька)
  - Nova Vodolaha (Нововодолазький район)
    - Urban-type settlements under the district's jurisdiction:
      - Birky (Бірки)
      - Nova Vodolaha (Нова Водолага)
  - Pechenihy (Печенізький район)
    - Urban-type settlements under the district's jurisdiction:
      - Pechenihy (Печеніги)
  - Pervomaiskyi (Первомайський район)
  - Sakhnovshchyna (Сахновщинський район)
    - Urban-type settlements under the district's jurisdiction:
      - Sakhnovshchyna (Сахновщина)
  - Shevchenkove (Шевченківський район)
    - Urban-type settlements under the district's jurisdiction:
      - Shevchenkove (Шевченкове)
  - Valky (Валківський район)
    - Cities under the district's jurisdiction:
      - Valky (Валки)
    - Urban-type settlements under the district's jurisdiction:
      - Koviahy (Ков'яги)
      - Staryi Merchyk (Старий Мерчик)
  - Velykyi Burluk (Великобурлуцький район)
    - Urban-type settlements under the district's jurisdiction:
      - Prykolotne (Приколотне)
      - Velykyi Burluk (Великий Бурлук)
  - Vovchansk (Вовчанський район)
    - Cities under the district's jurisdiction:
      - Vovchansk (Вовчанськ)
    - Urban-type settlements under the district's jurisdiction:
      - Bilyi Kolodiaz (Білий Колодязь)
      - Staryi Saltiv (Старий Салтів)
      - Vilcha (Вільча)
  - Zachepylivka (Зачепилівський район)
    - Urban-type settlements under the district's jurisdiction:
      - Zachepylivka (Зачепилівка)
  - Zmiiv (Зміївський район)
    - Cities under the district's jurisdiction:
      - Zmiiv (Зміїв)
    - Urban-type settlements under the district's jurisdiction:
      - Slobozhanske (Слобожанське), formerly Komsomolske
      - Zidky (Зідьки)
  - Zolochiv (Золочівський район)
    - Urban-type settlements under the district's jurisdiction:
      - Zolochiv (Золочів)
