= List of cities in Kharkiv Oblast =

Location of cities in Kharkiv Oblast, with green dots indicating Ukrainian-controlled cities and the red-green dots indicating the ongoing partial occupation of the cities.

There are 18 populated places in Kharkiv Oblast, Ukraine, that have been officially granted city status (Ukrainian: місто, romanized: misto) by the Verkhovna Rada, the country's parliament. Settlements with more than 10,000 people are eligible for city status, although the status is typically also granted to settlements of historical or regional importance. As of 5 December 2001, the date of the first and only official census in the country since independence, (Note: As of 11 July 2023) the most populous city in the oblast was the regional capital, Kharkiv, with a population of 1,470,902 people, while the least populous city was Pivdenne, with 8,516 people. After the enactment of decommunization laws, one city within the oblast, Slobozhanske, (Note: Slobozhanske was an urban-type settlement when it was renamed in 2016. It became a city in 2025, making it the most recent settlement to receive city status in the oblast.) was renamed in 2016 from its previous name, Komsomolske, for its connection to people, places, events, and organizations associated with the Soviet Union. In 2024, following the passage of derussification laws, the cities Krasnohrad and Pervomaiskyi were renamed Berestyn and Zlatopil respectively. For their contributions to the country's defense during the Russian invasion, two cities in the oblast (Kharkiv and Kupiansk) were awarded with the honorary title Hero City of Ukraine in 2022 and 2025 respectively.

From independence in 1991 to 2020, seven cities in the oblast were designated as cities of regional significance (municipalities), which had self-government under city councils, while the oblast's remaining 10 cities were located in 25 raions (districts) as cities of district significance, which are subordinated to the governments of the raions. On 18 July 2020, an administrative reform abolished and merged the oblast's raions and cities of regional significance into seven new, expanded raions. The seven raions that make up the oblast are Berestyn, Bohodukhiv, Chuhuiv, Izium, Kharkiv, Kupiansk, and Lozova.

== List of cities ==
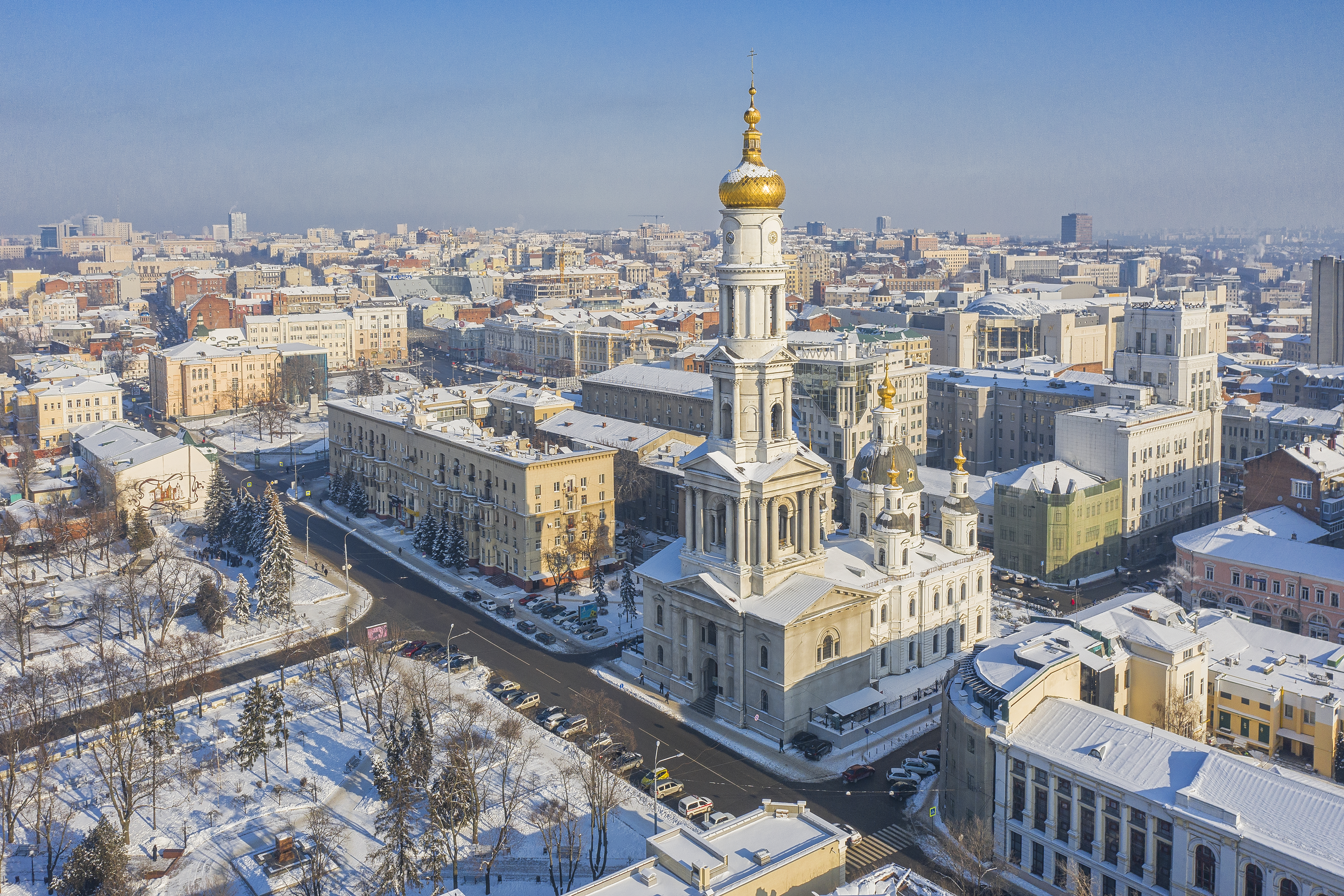
Kharkiv, capital and most populous city in Kharkiv Oblast

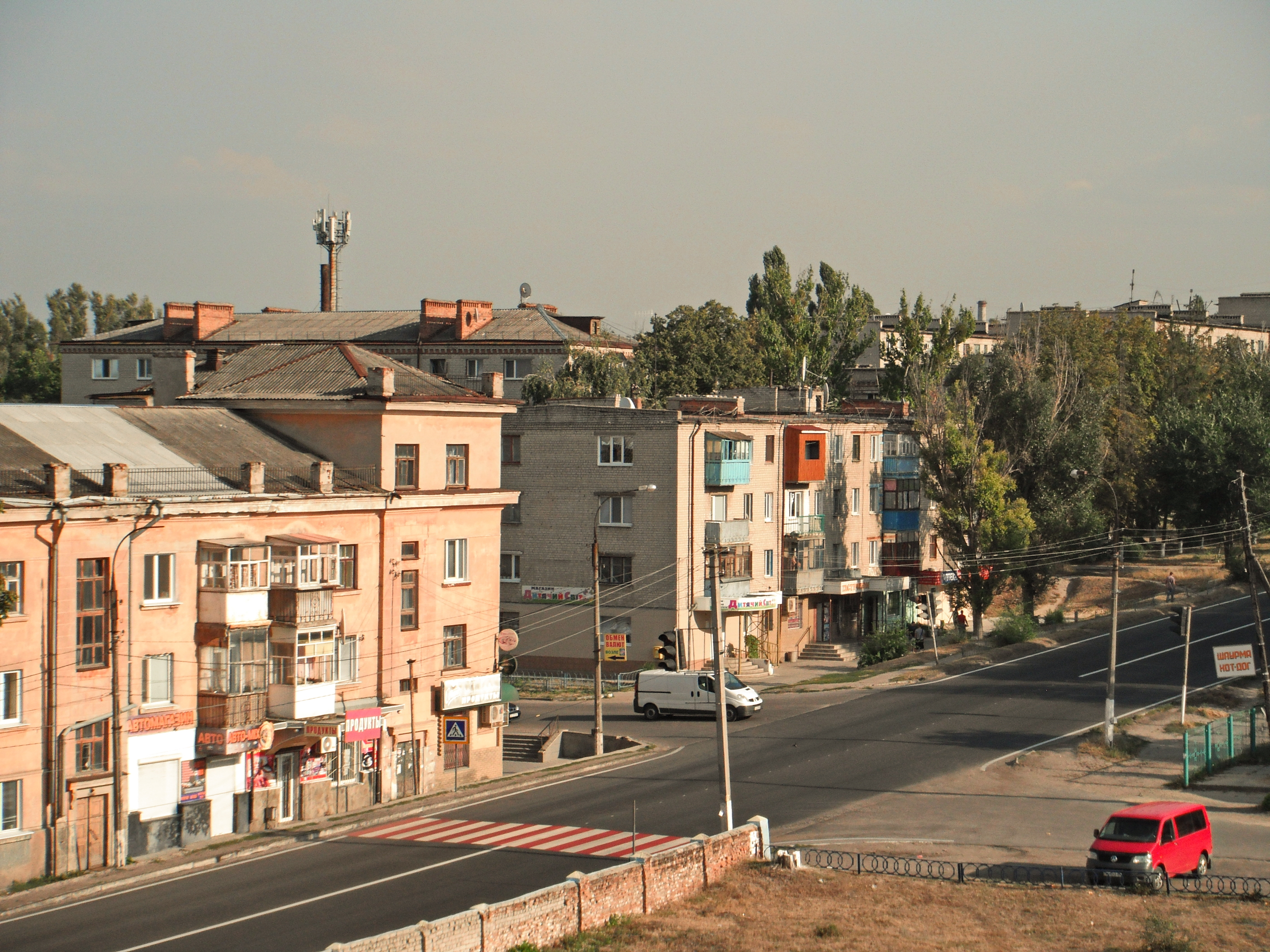
Izium, third most populous city in the oblast and an important railway city

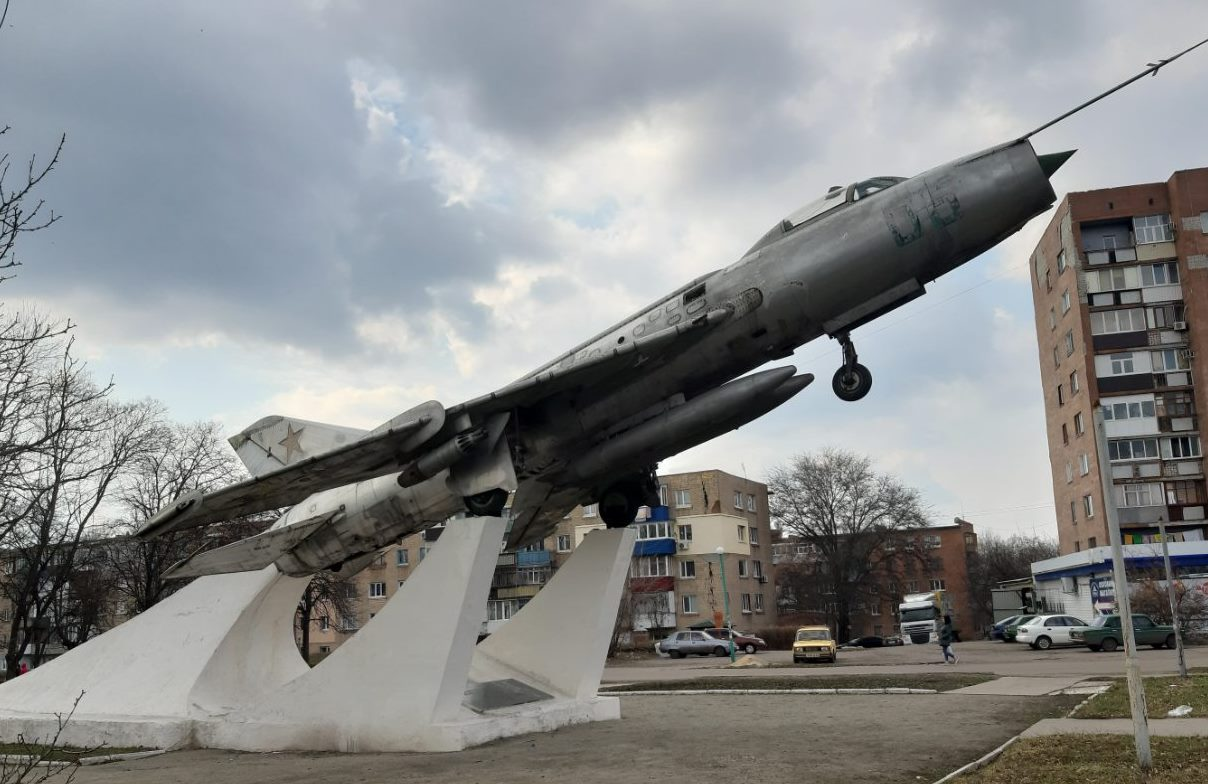
Berestyn, an industrial and railway center

Cities in Kharkiv Oblast
Name	Name (in Ukrainian) (Note: Links to the Ukrainian Wikipedia articles for each city)	Raion (district)	Population (2022 estimates)	Population (2001 census)	Population change
Balakliia	Балаклія	Izium	26,334	32,408	−18.74%
Barvinkove	Барвінкове	Izium	7,840	12,998	−39.68%
Berestyn	Берестин	Berestyn	19,674	22,670	−13.22%
Bohodukhiv	Богодухів	Bohodukhiv	14,624	18,224	−19.75%
Chuhuiv	Чугуїв	Chuhuiv	31,018	36,789	−15.69%
Derhachi	Дергачі	Kharkiv	17,139	20,258	−15.40%
Izium	Ізюм	Izium	44,979	56,114	−19.84%
Kharkiv	Харків	Kharkiv	1,421,125	1,470,902	−3.38%
Kupiansk	Куп'янськ	Kupiansk	26,627	32,449	−17.94%
Liubotyn	Люботин	Kharkiv	20,001	24,173	−17.26%
Lozova	Лозова	Lozova	53,126	64,041	−17.04%
Merefa	Мерефа	Kharkiv	21,202	25,018	−15.25%
Pivdenne	Південне	Kharkiv	7,319	8,516	−14.06%
Slobozhanske	Слобожанське	Chuhuiv	13,675	15,934	−14.18%
Valky	Валки	Bohodukhiv	8,577	10,381	−17.38%
Vovchansk	Вовчанськ	Chuhuiv	17,459	20,695	−15.64%
Zlatopil	Златопіль	Lozova	28,510	32,523	−12.34%
Zmiiv	Зміїв	Chuhuiv	13,737	17,063	−19.49%

== See also ==
- List of cities in Ukraine
