= Udy, Kharkiv Oblast =

Village in Kharkiv Oblast, Ukraine

Udy Уди
- village
- Interactive map of Udy
- Location of Udy within Kharkiv Oblast Udy (Ukraine)
- Coordinates: 50°23′18″N 36°03′53″E
- Country: Ukraine
- Oblast: Kharkiv
- Raion: Bohodukhiv
- Hromada: Zolochiv
- Founded: 14 November 1677

Population
  - Estimate (2023): 0
- Time zone: UTC+2
  - Summer (DST): UTC+3 (EEST)
- Postal code: 62220
- Area code: +380 5764

Udy (Ukrainian: Уди) is a village (selo) in Bohodukhiv Raion, Kharkiv Oblast, Ukraine. It belongs to the Zolochiv settlement hromada, one of the hromadas of Ukraine. The village was founded in 1677 and was known as Prystinne (Ukrainian: Пристінне) until 1706.

== Geography ==
The village is located on the banks of the Udy River and is approximately 4 km. from the Russian border.

== History ==
The village was founded on 14 November 1677 and was originally known as Prystinne.

In 1706, the village was renamed Udy, after the river of the same name.

During the Russian Empire, Udy was the administrative center of the Udyansk Volost^{[uk]}, a volost of the Kharkovskiy Uyezd.

In 1864, the village consisted of 432 farms and had a population of 3,742 (1,834 males and 1,908 females).

By 1914, the population had increased to 5,167.

406 village residents died as a result of the Holodomor.

In late August 2022, Udy was captured by Russian forces as part of the Russian invasion of Ukraine. Russian forces withdrew from the village by 11 September, according to the head of the Zolochiv hromada.

== See also ==
- 2022 Ukrainian Kharkiv counteroffensive
- Russian occupation of Kharkiv Oblast
