= Vilshany =

Rural locality in Kharkiv Oblast, Ukraine

Vilshany Вільшани
- Rural settlement
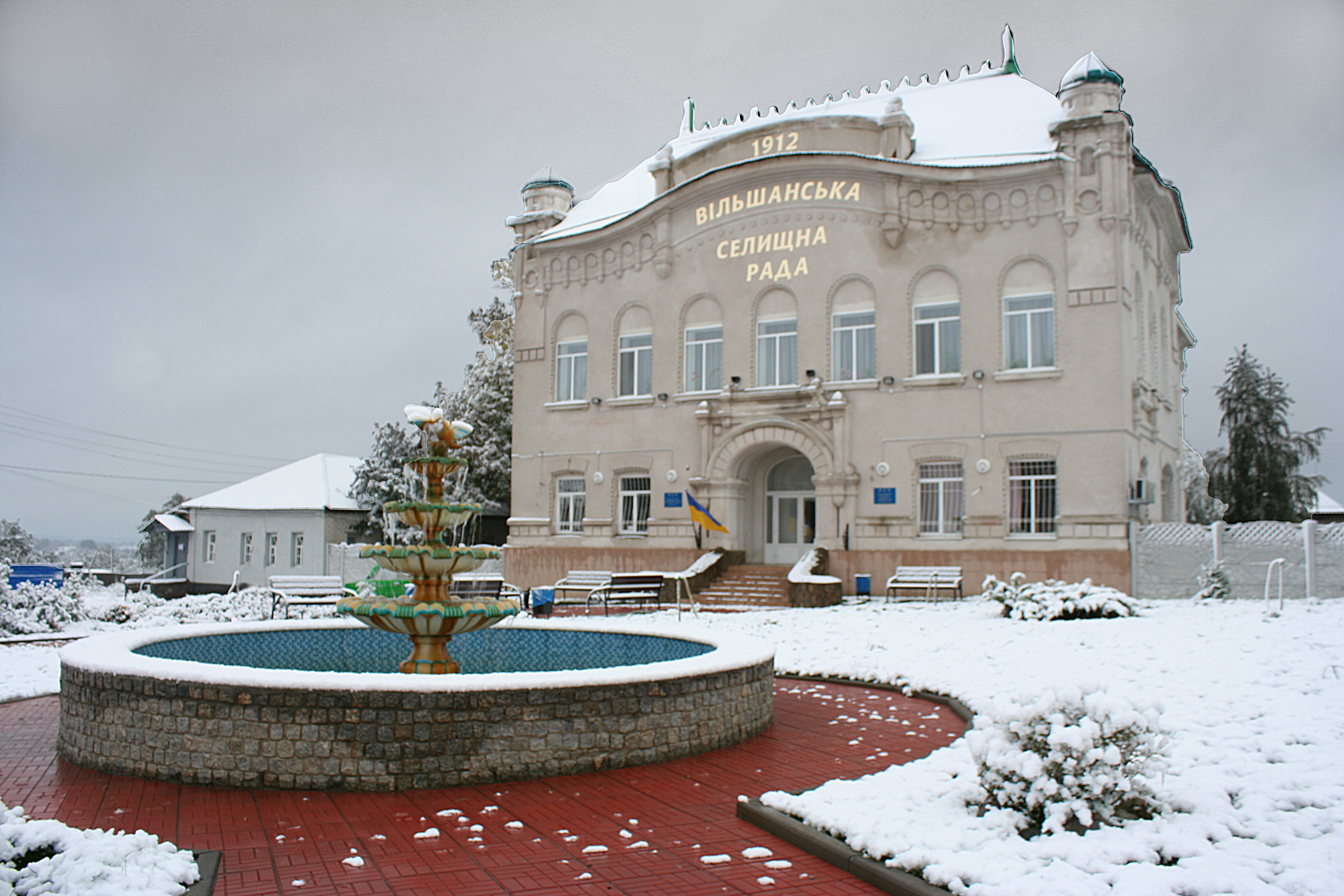
- Square in front of the village council

- Location in Kharkiv Oblast Location in Ukraine
- Coordinates: 50°03′08″N 35°53′24″E
- Country: Ukraine
- Oblast: Kharkiv Oblast
- Raion: Kharkiv Raion

Population (2022)
  - Total: 6,682
- Time zone: UTC+2 (EET)
  - Summer (DST): UTC+3 (EEST)

Vilshany (Ukrainian: Вільшани, Russian: Ольшаны) is a rural settlement in Kharkiv Raion of Kharkiv Oblast in Ukraine. It is located on both banks of the Kryvorotivka, a right tributary of the Udy, in the basin of the Don. Vilshany belongs to Solonytsivka settlement hromada, one of the hromadas of Ukraine. Population: 6,682 (2022 estimate).

== History ==
Until 18 July 2020, Vilshany belonged to Derhachi Raion. The raion was abolished in July 2020 as part of the administrative reform of Ukraine, which reduced the number of raions of Kharkiv Oblast to seven. The area of Derhachi Raion was merged into Kharkiv Raion.

Until 26 January 2024, Vilshany was designated urban-type settlement. On this day, a new law entered into force which abolished this status, and Vilshany became a rural settlement.

== Economy ==
=== Transportation ===
The closest railway station is in Peresichne, a few kilometers east, on the railway line connecting Kharkiv and Zolochiv which continues across the Russian border to Gotnya.

The settlement has road access to Kharkiv and Bohodukhiv.

=== Industry ===
Enterprises of furniture production and textile industry are located in the settlement.

== Gallery ==
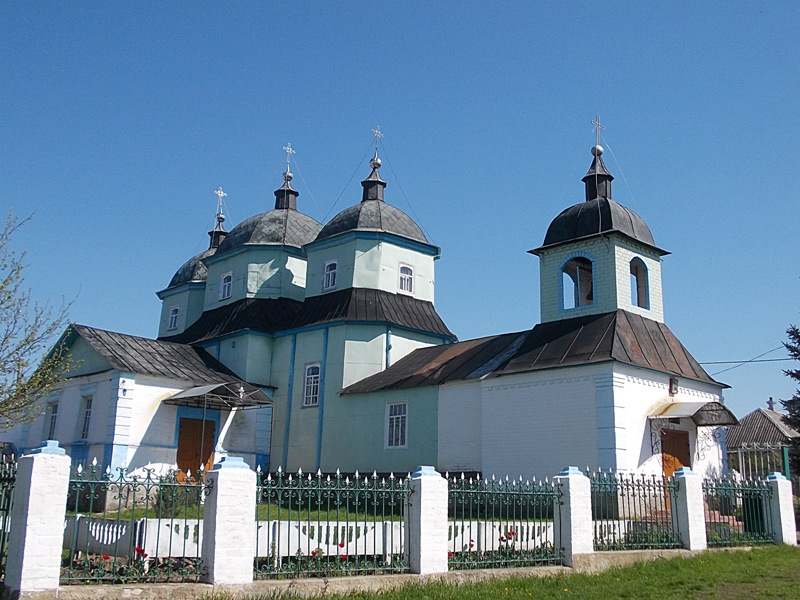
St. Nicholas Church (1741)

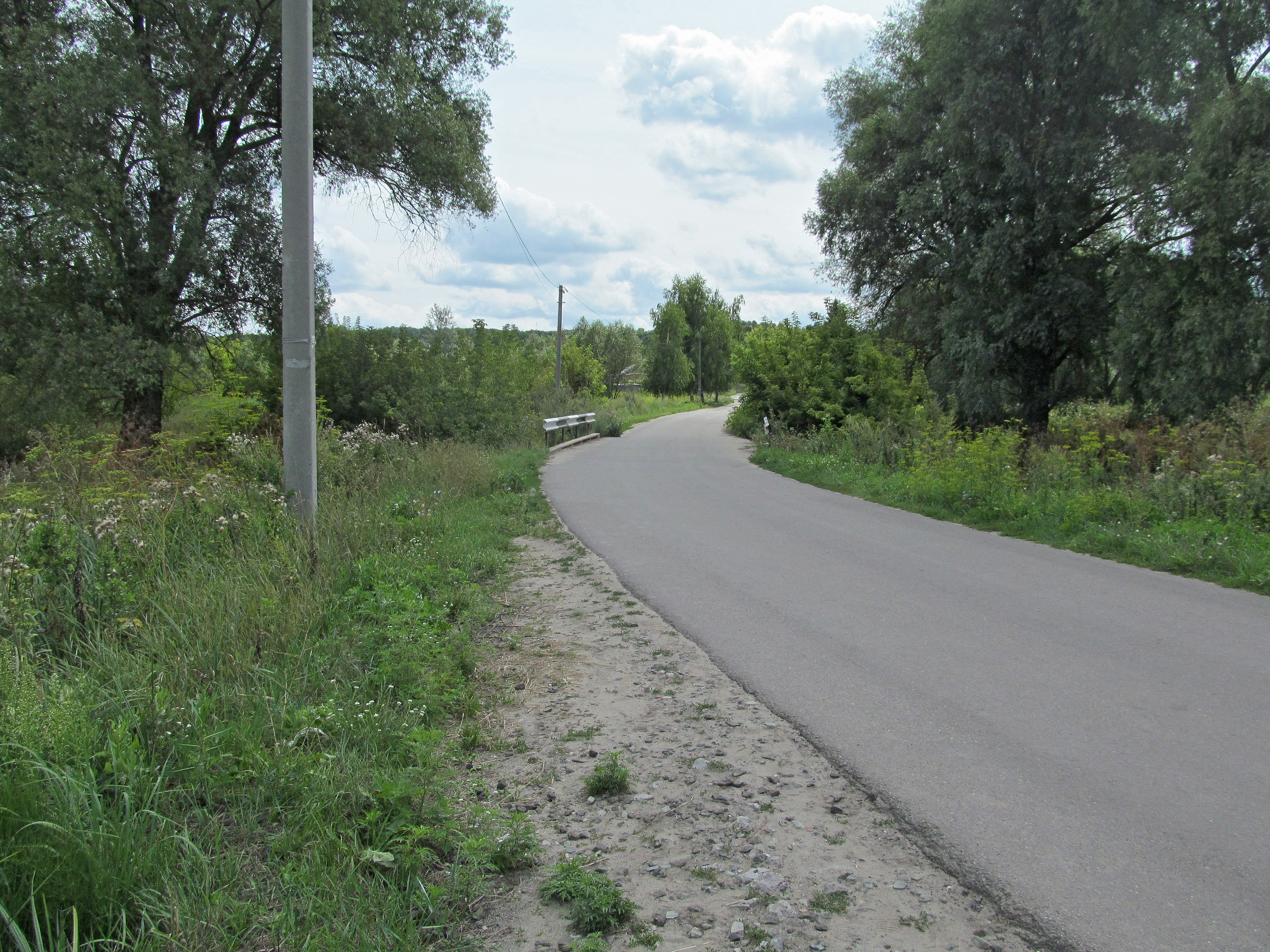
Local road

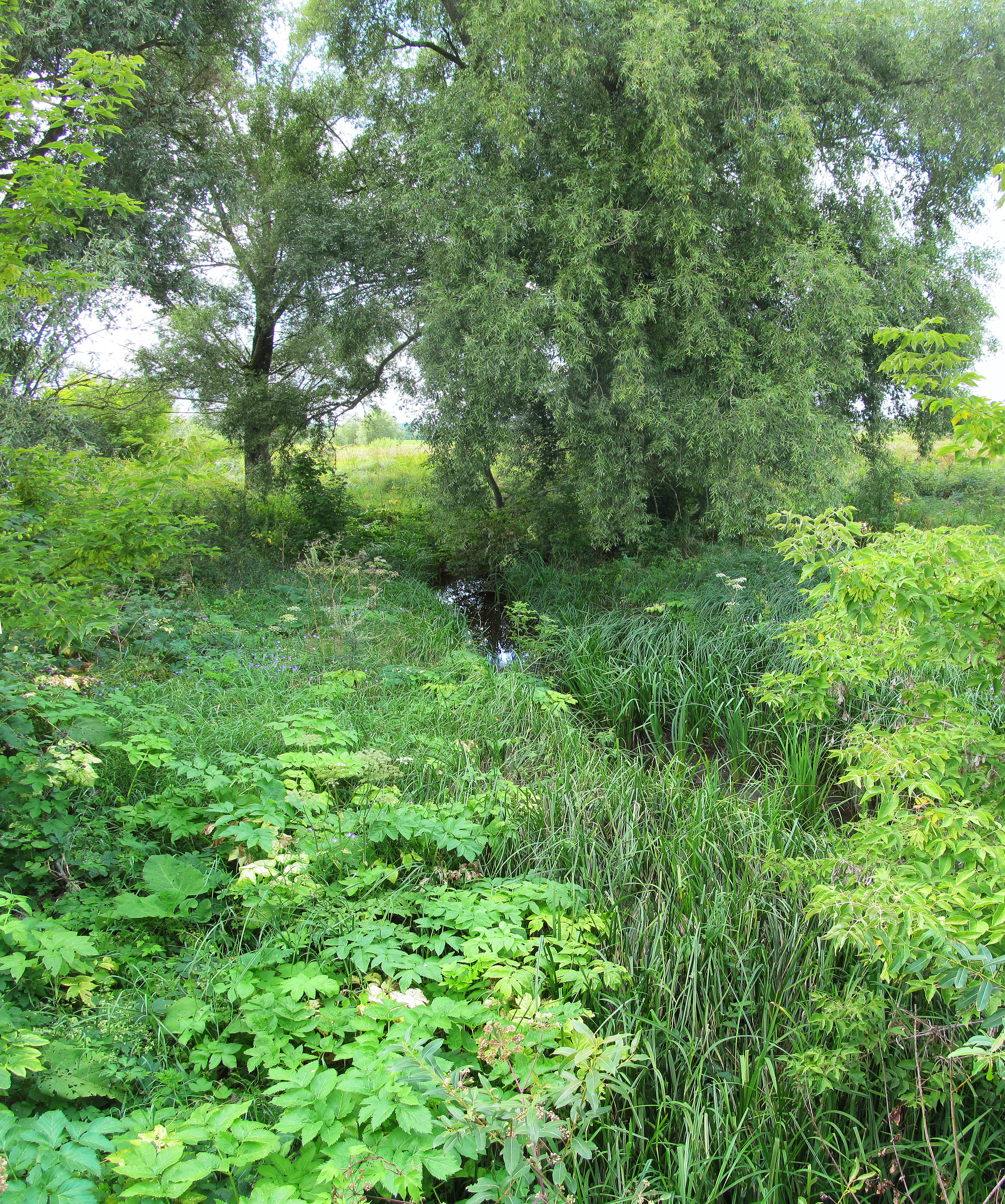
Kryvorotivka river
