= Babai, Ukraine =

Rural locality in Kharkiv Oblast, Ukraine

Babai Бабаї
- Rural settlement
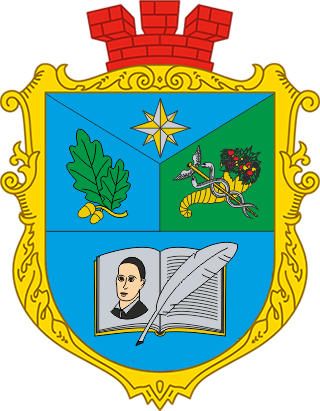
- Coat of arms

- Location in Kharkiv Oblast Location in Ukraine
- Coordinates: 49°53′49″N 36°11′45″E
- Country: Ukraine
- Oblast: Kharkiv Oblast
- Raion: Kharkiv Raion

Population (2022)
  - Total: 6,487
  - Estimate (2023): ▼6,403
- Time zone: UTC+2 (EET)
  - Summer (DST): UTC+3 (EEST)

Babai (Ukrainian: Бабаї; Russian: Бабаи) is a rural settlement in Kharkiv Raion, Kharkiv Oblast, Ukraine. It is located on the right bank of the Udy in the drainage basin of the Don. Babai belongs to Vysokyi settlement hromada, one of the hromadas of Ukraine. Population: 6,487 (2022 estimate).

Until 26 January 2024, Babai was designated urban-type settlement. On this day, a new law entered into force which abolished this status, and Babai became a rural settlement.

== Economy ==
=== Transportation ===
The closest railway stations are Pokotylivka and Karachivka, both in Pokotylivka, on the railway connecting Kharkiv and Synelnykove via Lozova and Pavlohrad.

The settlement has road access to Highway M18 connecting Kharkiv with Dnipro and Zaporizhzhia.
