= Khoroshyovo =

Khoroshyovo (Russian: Хорошёво) may refer to:

- Khoroshyovo (Moscow Central Circle), a station on the Moscow Central Circle, Russia
- Khoroshyovo-Mnyovniki District, a district of North-Western Administrative Okrug, Moscow, Russia
- Khorosheve, a settlement in Kharkiv Oblast, Ukraine
