= Staryi Merchyk =

Rural locality in Kharkiv Oblast, Ukraine

Staryi Merchyk Старий Мерчик
- Rural settlement
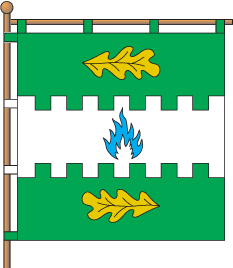
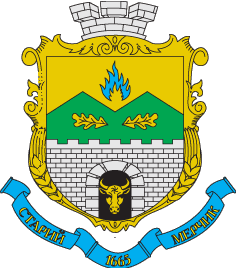
- Flag Coat of arms

- Location in Kharkiv Oblast Location in Ukraine
- Coordinates: 49°58′45″N 35°45′36″E
- Country: Ukraine
- Oblast: Kharkiv Oblast
- Raion: Bohodukhiv Raion

Population (2022)
  - Total: 1,763
- Time zone: UTC+2 (EET)
  - Summer (DST): UTC+3 (EEST)

Staryi Merchyk (Ukrainian: Старий Мерчик, Russian: Старый Мерчик) is a rural settlement in Bohodukhiv Raion of Kharkiv Oblast in Ukraine. It is located on the Mokryi Merchyk, a tributary of the Merchyk in the drainage basin of the Dnieper. Staryi Merchyk belongs to Valky urban hromada, one of the hromadas of Ukraine. Population: 1,763 (2022 estimate).

== History ==
Until 18 July 2020, Staryi Merchyk belonged to Valky Raion. The raion was abolished in July 2020 as part of the administrative reform of Ukraine, which reduced the number of raions of Kharkiv Oblast to seven. The area of Valky Raion was merged into Bohodukhiv Raion.

Until 26 January 2024, Staryi Merchyk was designated urban-type settlement. On this day, a new law entered into force which abolished this status, and Staryi Merchyk became a rural settlement.

== Economy ==
=== Transportation ===
The closest railway stations are Merchyk on the railway connecting Kharkiv with Sumy via Bohodukhiv and Ohultsi on the railway connecting Kharkiv with Poltava. Both stations have some passenger traffic.

The settlement has access to Highway M03 which connects Kharkiv with Kyiv.
