= Koviahy =

Rural locality in Kharkiv Oblast, Ukraine

Koviahy Ков'яги
- Rural settlement
- Location within Ukraine Location within Kharkiv Oblast
- Coordinates: 49°54′25″N 35°33′10″E
- Country: Ukraine
- Oblast: Kharkiv Oblast
- Raion: Bohodukhiv Raion
- Hromada: Valky urban hromada

Population (2022)
  - Total: 2,912
- Time zone: UTC+2 (EET)
  - Summer (DST): UTC+3 (EEST)

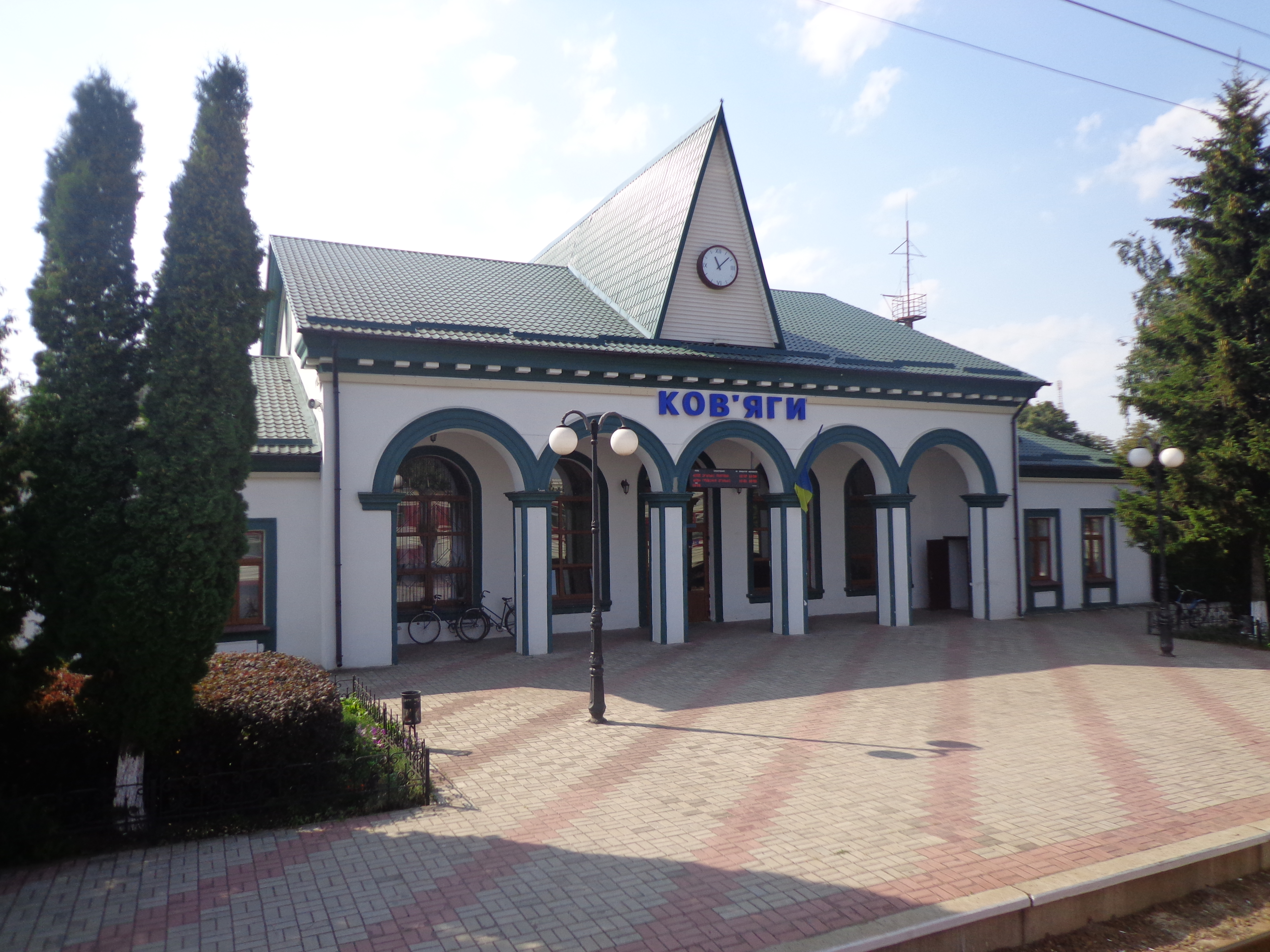
Koviahy railway station

Koviahy (Ukrainian: Ков'яги) is a rural settlement in Bohodukhiv Raion (district) of Kharkiv Oblast in eastern Ukraine. It is an administrative center of Koviahy Council which, includes the villages of Zhuravli, Rozsokhivka, Trokhymivka and Halimonivka. Koviahy belongs to Valky urban hromada, one of the hromadas of Ukraine. Population: 2,912 (2022 estimate)

== History ==
It was a village in Valky uyezd of Kharkov Governorate of the Russian Empire.

During World War II, it was under German occupation from October 1941 to August 1943.

Urban-type settlement since 1968.

In January 1989, the population was 3963 people.

In January 2013, the population was 3138 people.

In January 2018, the population was 3079 people.

A railway station is here.

Until 18 July 2020, Koviahy belonged to Valky Raion. The raion was abolished in July 2020 as part of the administrative reform of Ukraine, which reduced the number of raions of Kharkiv Oblast to seven. The area of Valky Raion was merged into Bohodukhiv Raion.

Until 26 January 2024, Koviahy was designated urban-type settlement. On this day, a new law entered into force which abolished this status, and Koviahy became a rural settlement.

== Sources ==
- Site about Kovyagi
