= Peresichne =

Rural locality in Kharkiv Oblast, Ukraine

Peresichne Пересічне
- Rural settlement
- Location in Kharkiv Oblast Location in Ukraine
- Coordinates: 50°01′19″N 35°58′54″E
- Country: Ukraine
- Oblast: Kharkiv Oblast
- Raion: Kharkiv Raion

Population (2022)
  - Total: 6,922
- Time zone: UTC+2 (EET)
  - Summer (DST): UTC+3 (EEST)

Peresichne (Ukrainian: Пересічне, Russian: Пересечное) is a rural settlement in Kharkiv Raion of Kharkiv Oblast in Ukraine. It is located on the left bank of the Udy, in the drainage basin of the Don. Peresichne belongs to Solonytsivka settlement hromada, one of the hromadas of Ukraine. Population: 6,922 (2022 estimate).

== History ==
Until 18 July 2020, Peresichne belonged to Derhachi Raion. The raion was abolished in July 2020 as part of the administrative reform of Ukraine, which reduced the number of raions of Kharkiv Oblast to seven. The area of Derhachi Raion was merged into Kharkiv Raion.

Until 26 January 2024, Peresichne was designated urban-type settlement. On this day, a new law entered into force which abolished this status, and Peresichne became a rural settlement.

== Economy ==
=== Transportation ===
Peresichne has three railway stations: Peresichne, 224 km, and Kurortna. They are all located on the railway line connecting Kharkiv and Zolochiv which continues across the Russian border to Gotnya.

The settlement has road access to Kharkiv and Bohodukhiv.
