= Huty, Kharkiv Oblast =

Rural locality in Kharkiv Oblast, Ukraine

Huty Гути
- Rural settlement
- Location in Kharkiv Oblast Location in Ukraine
- Coordinates: 50°08′17″N 35°21′12″E
- Country: Ukraine
- Oblast: Kharkiv Oblast
- Raion: Bohodukhiv Raion

Population (2022)
  - Total: 1,621
- Time zone: UTC+2 (EET)
  - Summer (DST): UTC+3 (EEST)

Huty (Ukrainian: Гути, Russian: Гуты) is a rural settlement in Bohodukhiv Raion of Kharkiv Oblast in Ukraine. It is located on the banks of the Merla, a tributary of the Vorskla in the drainage basin of the Dnieper. Huty belongs to Bohodukhiv urban hromada, one of the hromadas of Ukraine. Population: 1,621 (2022 estimate).

Until 26 January 2024, Huty was designated urban-type settlement. On this day, a new law entered into force which abolished this status, and Huty became a rural settlement.

== Economy ==
=== Industry ===
Huty is home for a sugar refinery.

=== Transportation ===
The closest passenger railway station is located in Bohodukhiv, on the railway connecting Kharkiv and Sumy.

The settlement has local access to Bohodukhiv, and from there to Kharkiv and Sumy.
