= Vvedenka, Kharkiv Oblast =

Rural locality in Kharkiv Oblast, Ukraine

Vvedenka Введенка
- Rural settlement
- Location in Kharkiv Oblast Location in Ukraine
- Coordinates: 49°49′37″N 36°30′28″E
- Country: Ukraine
- Oblast: Kharkiv Oblast
- Raion: Chuhuiv Raion

Population (2022)
  - Total: 2,320
  - Estimate (01.08.2024): 2,060
- Time zone: UTC+2 (EET)
  - Summer (DST): UTC+3 (EEST)

Vvedenka (Ukrainian: Введенка, Russian: Введенка) is a rural settlement in Chuhuiv Raion of Kharkiv Oblast in Ukraine. It is located on the left bank of the Udy, a tributary of the Donets. Vvedenka belongs to Novopokrovka settlement hromada, one of the hromadas of Ukraine. Population: 2,320 (2022 estimate).

Until 26 January 2024, Vvedenka was designated urban-type settlement. On this day, a new law entered into force which abolished this status, and Vvedenka became a rural settlement.

== Economy ==
=== Transportation ===
41 km railway station is located in Vvedenka. It is on the railway connecting Kharkiv and Kupiansk. There is regular passenger traffic.

The settlement has road access to Highway M03 connecting Kharkiv and Sloviansk.
