= Sharivka =

Rural locality in Kharkiv Oblast, Ukraine

Sharivka Шарівка
- Rural settlement
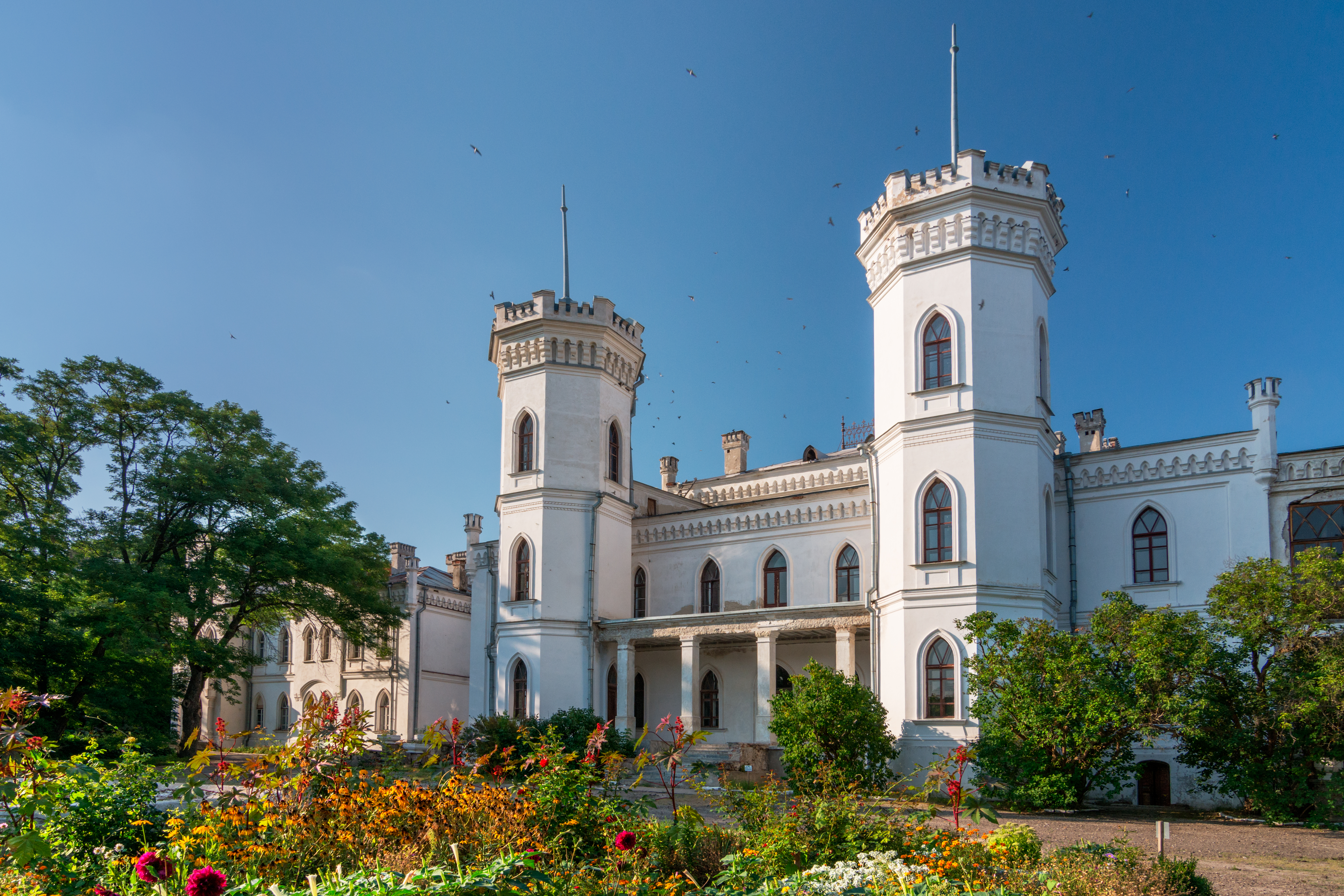
- Sharivka Manor

- Location in Kharkiv Oblast Location in Ukraine
- Coordinates: 50°01′13″N 35°26′52″E
- Country: Ukraine
- Oblast: Kharkiv Oblast
- Raion: Bohodukhiv Raion

Population (2022)
  - Total: 1,546
- Time zone: UTC+2 (EET)
  - Summer (DST): UTC+3 (EEST)

Sharivka (Ukrainian: Шарівка, Russian: Шаровка) is a rural settlement in Bohodukhiv Raion of Kharkiv Oblast in Ukraine. It is located on the left bank of the Merchyk, a tributary of the Merla in the drainage basin of the Dnieper. Sharivka belongs to Bohodukhiv urban hromada, one of the hromadas of Ukraine. Population: 1,546 (2022 estimate) At least 332 of Sharivka's Jews were murdered during the Holocaust.

Until 26 January 2024, Sharivka was designated urban-type settlement. Since then, a new law entered into force which abolished this status, and Sharivka became a rural settlement.

== Economy ==
=== Transportation ===
The settlement has access by local roads to Kharkiv and Krasnokutsk.
