= Zolochiv Raion, Kharkiv Oblast =

Former subdivision of Kharkiv Oblast, Ukraine

Zolochiv Raion Золочівський район
- Raion
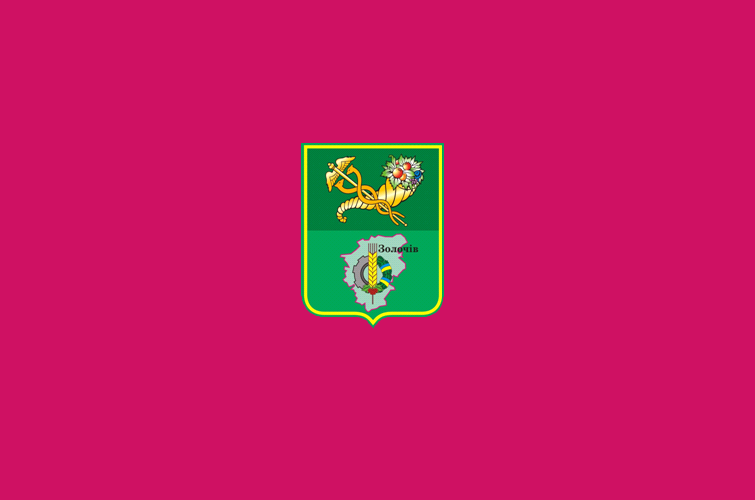
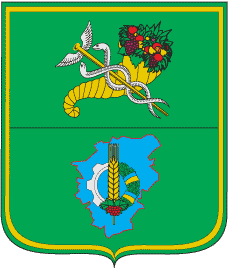
- Flag Coat of arms

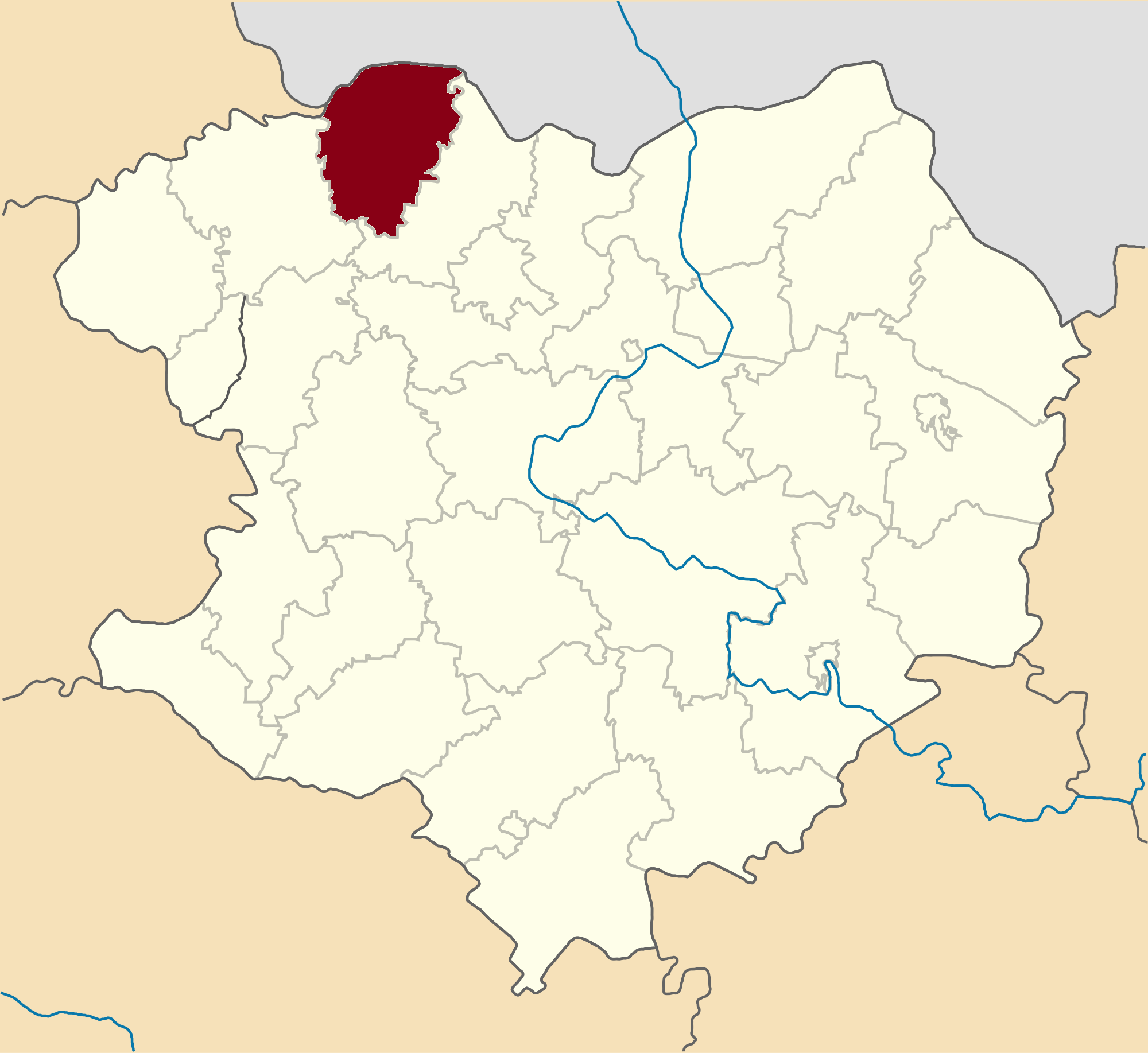
- Raion location in Kharkiv Oblast
- Coordinates: 50°16′58.3752″N 35°55′43.1394″E
- Country: Ukraine
- Oblast: Kharkiv Oblast
- Disestablished: 2020
- Admin. center: Zolochiv

Area
  - Total: 968.6 km^{2} (374.0 sq mi)

Population (2020)
  - Total: 24,739
  - Density: 25.54/km^{2} (66.15/sq mi)
- Time zone: UTC+2 (EET)
  - Summer (DST): UTC+3 (EEST)
- Website: https://web.archive.org/web/20140322075118/http://zolochiv.inf.ua:80/

Zolochiv Raion (Ukrainian: Золочівський район) was a raion (district) in Kharkiv Oblast of Ukraine. Its administrative center was the urban-type settlement of Zolochiv. The raion was abolished on 18 July 2020 as part of the administrative reform of Ukraine, which reduced the number of raions of Kharkiv Oblast to seven. The area of Zolochiv Raion was merged into Bohodukhiv Raion. The last estimate of the raion population was 24,739 (2020 est.)

At the time of disestablishment, the raion consisted of one hromada, Zolochiv settlement hromada with the administration in Zolochiv.
