= Vasyshcheve =

Rural locality in Kharkiv Oblast, Ukraine

Vasyshcheve Васищеве
- Rural settlement
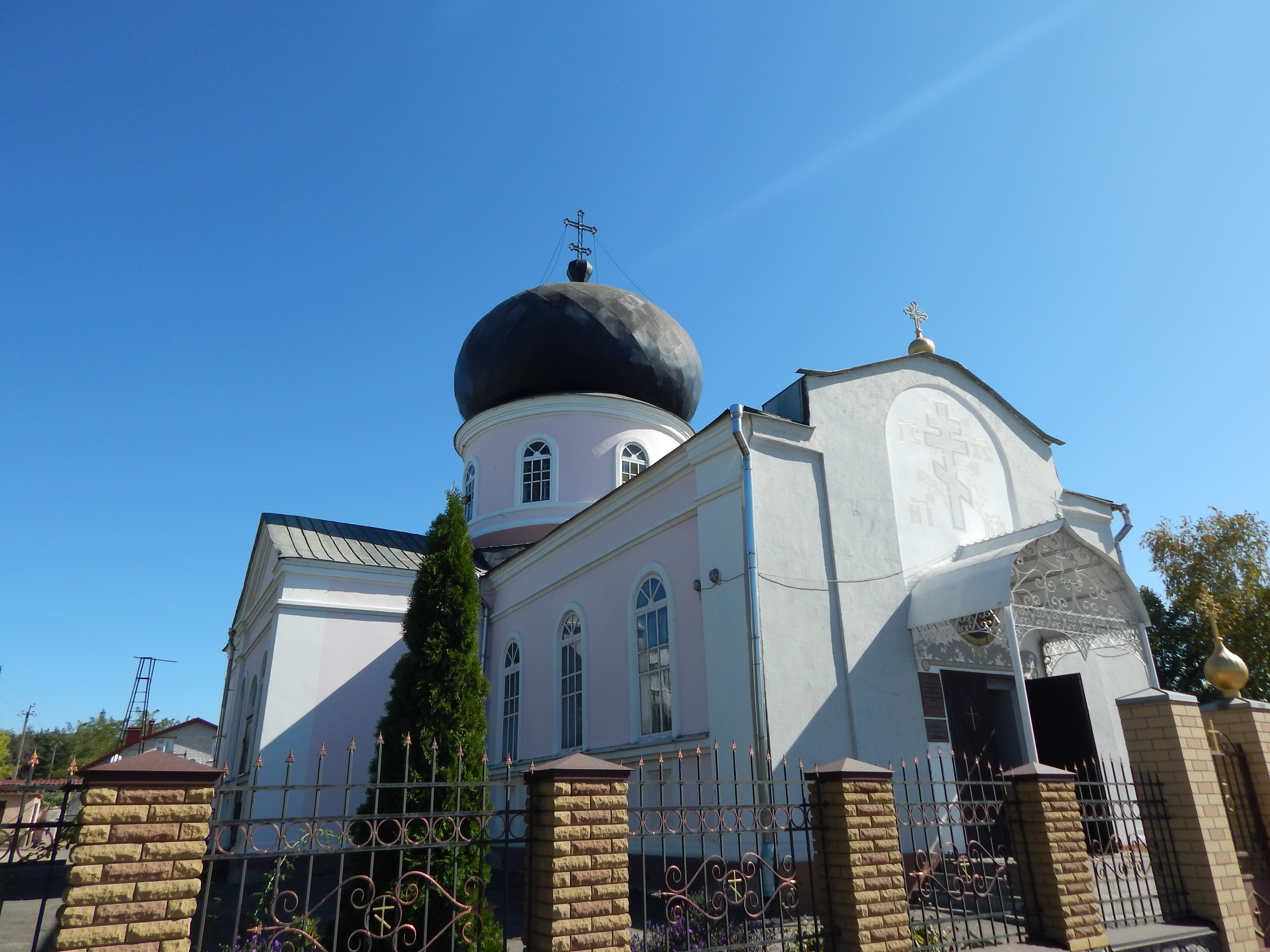
- Church of Saint Demetrius of Thessaloniki

- Location in Kharkiv Oblast Location in Ukraine
- Coordinates: 49°50′02″N 36°19′49″E
- Country: Ukraine
- Oblast: Kharkiv Oblast
- Raion: Kharkiv Raion
- Hromada: Bezliudivka settlement hromada

Population (2022)
  - Total: 5,641
- Time zone: UTC+2 (EET)
  - Summer (DST): UTC+3 (EEST)

Vasyshcheve (Ukrainian: Васищеве, Russian: Васищево) is a rural settlement in Kharkiv Raion of Kharkiv Oblast in Ukraine. It lies on the banks of the Studenok where it joins the Udy, in the drainage basin of the Don. Vasyshcheve belongs to Bezliudivka settlement hromada, one of the hromadas of Ukraine. Population: 5,641 (2022 estimate).

Until 26 January 2024, Vasyshcheve was designated urban-type settlement. On this day, a new law entered into force which abolished this status, and Vasyshcheve became a rural settlement.

== Economy ==
=== Transportation ===
The closest railway station, Ternove, is on the railway connecting Kharkiv and Kupiansk-Vuzlovyi. There is infrequent passenger traffic.

The settlement has access to Kharkiv Ring Road, and eventually to the road network of the city of Kharkiv.
