= Khorosheve =

Rural locality in Kharkiv Oblast, Ukraine

Khorosheve Хорошеве
- Rural settlement
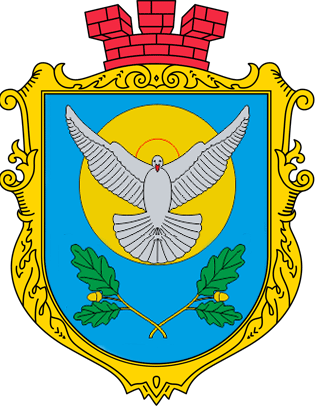
- Coat of arms

- Location in Kharkiv Oblast Location in Ukraine
- Coordinates: 49°50′56″N 36°14′10″E
- Country: Ukraine
- Oblast: Kharkiv Oblast
- Raion: Kharkiv Raion
- Hromada: Bezliudivka settlement hromada

Population (2022)
  - Total: 3,984
- Time zone: UTC+2 (EET)
  - Summer (DST): UTC+3 (EEST)

Khorosheve (Ukrainian: Хорошеве, Russian: Хорошево) is a rural settlement in Kharkiv Raion of Kharkiv Oblast in Ukraine. It is located on the right bank of the Udy, in the drainage basin of the Don, south of the city of Kharkiv. Khorosheve belongs to Bezliudivka settlement hromada, one of the hromadas of Ukraine. Population: 3,984 (2022 estimate).

Until 26 January 2024, Khorosheve was designated urban-type settlement. On this day, a new law entered into force which abolished this status, and Khorosheve became a rural settlement.

== Economy ==
=== Transportation ===
Zhykhor railway station is located in Khorosheve, on the railway connecting Kharkiv and Sloviansk via Izium. Local passenger trains stop at the station.

The settlement has road access to Highway M18 connecting Kharkiv with Dnipro and Zaporizhzhia.
