= Kochetok =

Rural locality in Kharkiv Oblast, Ukraine

Kochetok Кочеток
- Rural settlement
- Location in Kharkiv Oblast Location in Ukraine
- Coordinates: 49°52′42″N 36°44′16″E
- Country: Ukraine
- Oblast: Kharkiv Oblast
- Raion: Chuhuiv Raion

Population (2022)
  - Total: 2,916
  - Estimate (2024): 2,115
- Time zone: UTC+2 (EET)
  - Summer (DST): UTC+3 (EEST)

Kochetok (Ukrainian: Кочеток, Russian: Кочеток) is a rural settlement in Chuhuiv Raion of Kharkiv Oblast in Ukraine. It is located on the right bank of the Donets. Kochetok belongs to Chuhuiv urban hromada, one of the hromadas of Ukraine. Population: 2,916 (2022 estimate).

Until 26 January 2024, Kochetok was designated urban-type settlement. On this day, a new law entered into force which abolished this status, and Kochetok became a rural settlement.

== Economy ==
=== Transportation ===
The closest railway station is in Chuhuiv, on the railway connecting Kharkiv and Kupiansk-Vuzlovyi.

The settlement is connected by road with Chuhuiv where there is road access to Highway M03 connecting Kharkiv and Sloviansk.
