= Utkivka =

Rural locality in Kharkiv Oblast, Ukraine

Utkivka Утківка
- Rural settlement
- Location in Kharkiv Oblast Location in Ukraine
- Coordinates: 49°47′33″N 36°01′11″E
- Country: Ukraine
- Oblast: Kharkiv Oblast
- Raion: Kharkiv Raion
- Hromada: Merefa urban hromada

Population (2024)
  - Total: 1,000
- Time zone: UTC+2 (EET)
  - Summer (DST): UTC+3 (EEST)

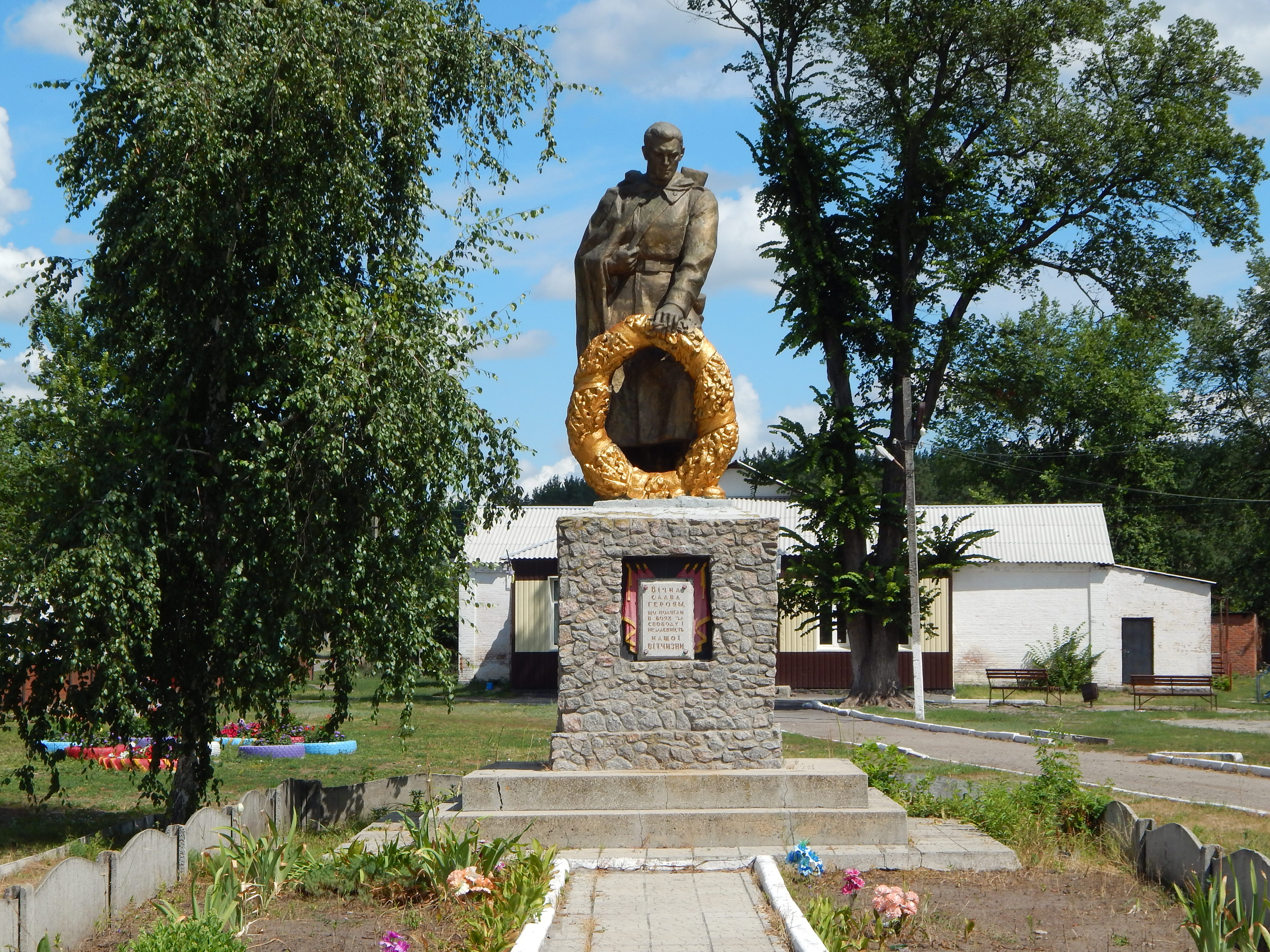
Grave of Soviet soldiers in Utkivka

Utkivka (Ukrainian: Утківка, Russian: Утковка) is a rural settlement in Kharkiv Raion of Kharkiv Oblast in Ukraine. It is located on the left bank of the Mzha, in the drainage basin of the Don. Utkivka belongs to Merefa urban hromada, one of the hromadas of Ukraine. Population: 1,145 (2022 estimate).

Until 26 January 2024, Utkivka was designated urban-type settlement. On this day, a new law entered into force which abolished this status, and Utkivka became a rural settlement.

== Economy ==
=== Transportation ===
Utkivka railway station is on the railway connecting Kharkiv and Krasnohrad. There is local passenger traffic.

The settlement has road access to Highway M18 connecting Kharkiv with Dnipro and Zaporizhzhia.
