= Berezivka, Kharkiv Raion, Kharkiv Oblast =

Rural locality in Kharkiv Oblast, Ukraine

Berezivka Березівка
- Rural settlement
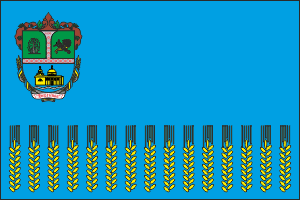
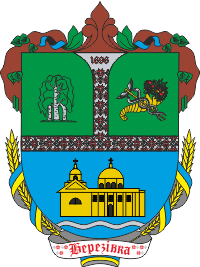
- Flag Coat of arms

- Location in Kharkiv Oblast Location in Ukraine
- Coordinates: 49°54′16″N 36°04′04″E
- Country: Ukraine
- Oblast: Kharkiv Oblast
- Raion: Kharkiv Raion

Population (2022)
  - Total: 1,559
- Time zone: UTC+2 (EET)
  - Summer (DST): UTC+3 (EEST)

Berezivka (Ukrainian: Березівка, Russian: Березовка) is a rural settlement in Kharkiv Raion of Kharkiv Oblast in Ukraine. It is located approximately 15 kilometres (9.3 mi) southwest of the city of Kharkiv and belongs to Kharkiv urban agglomeration. Berezivka belongs to Pisochyn settlement hromada, one of the hromadas of Ukraine. Population: 1,559 (2022 estimate).

Until 26 January 2024, Berezivka was designated urban-type settlement. On this day, a new law entered into force which abolished this status, and Berezivka became a rural settlement.

== Economy ==
=== Transportation ===
The closest railway station is Budy on the railway connecting Liubotyn and Merefa. There is infrequent passenger traffic.

The settlement is included in the road network of Kharkiv urban agglomeration.
