= Pokotylivka =

Rural locality in Kharkiv Oblast, Ukraine

Pokotylivka Покотилівка
- Rural settlement
- Location in Kharkiv Oblast Location in Ukraine
- Coordinates: 49°54′41″N 36°10′43″E
- Country: Ukraine
- Oblast: Kharkiv Oblast
- Raion: Kharkiv Raion

Population (2022)
  - Total: 9,121
- Time zone: UTC+2 (EET)
  - Summer (DST): UTC+3 (EEST)

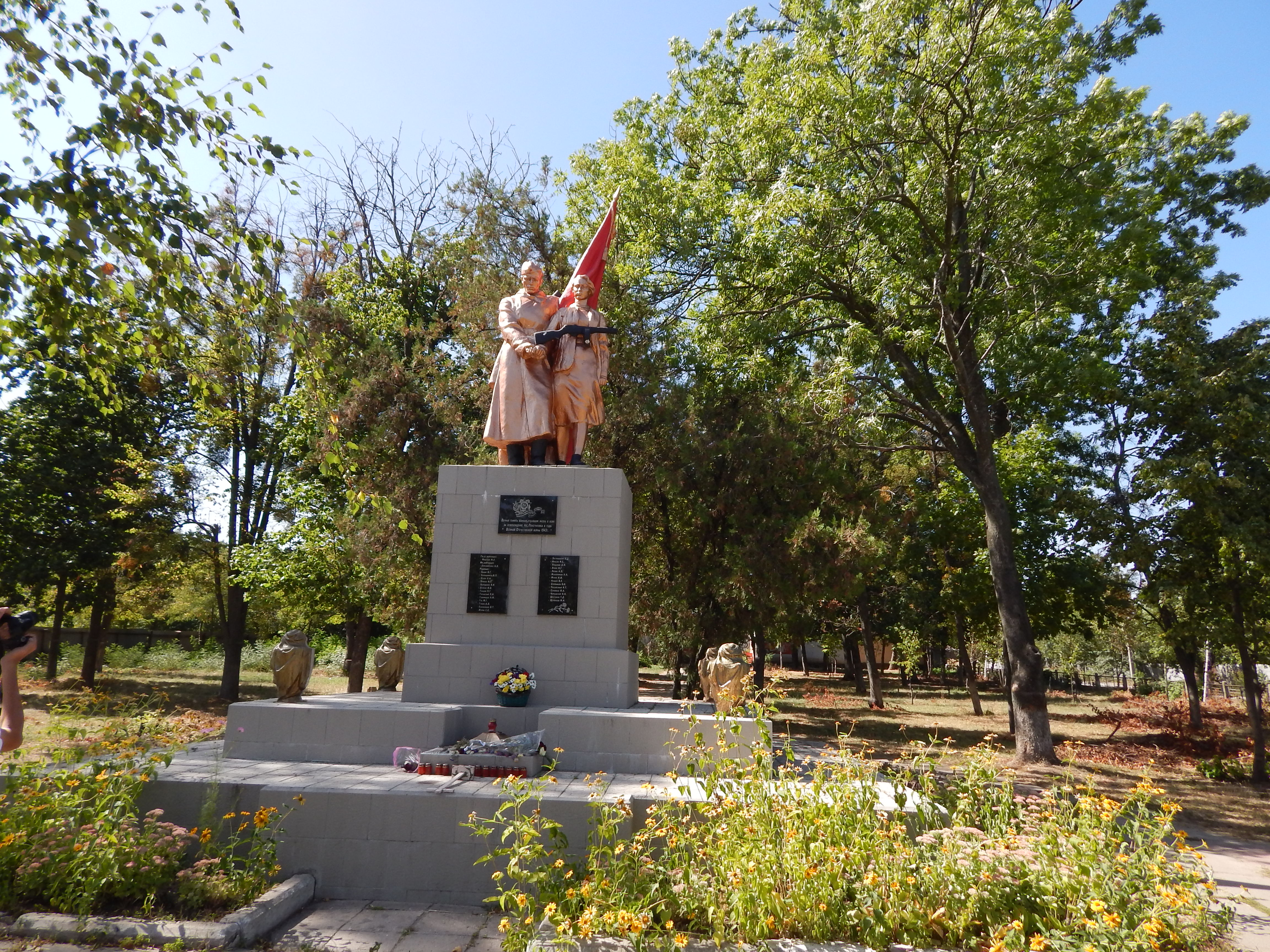
Mass grave of Soviet soldiers, Pokytylivka

Pokotylivka (Ukrainian: Покотилівка, Russian: Покотиловка, romanized: Pokotilovka) is a rural settlement in Kharkiv Raion of Kharkiv Oblast in Ukraine. It is a southwestern suburb of Kharkiv and is located on the left bank of the Udy, in the drainage basin of the Don. Pokotylivka belongs to Vysokyi settlement hromada, one of the hromadas of Ukraine. Population: 9,121 (2022 estimate).

Until 26 January 2024, Pokotylivka was designated urban-type settlement. On this day, a new law entered into force which abolished this status, and Pokotylivka became a rural settlement.

== Economy ==
=== Transportation ===
Pokotylivka and Karachivka railway stations are both in Pokotylivka, on the railway connecting Kharkiv and Synelnykove via Lozova and Pavlohrad. There is significant passenger traffic through both stations.

The settlement has road access to Highway M18 connecting Kharkiv with Dnipro and Zaporizhzhia.
