= Zidky =

Rural locality in Kharkiv Oblast, Ukraine

Zidky Зидьки
- Rural settlement
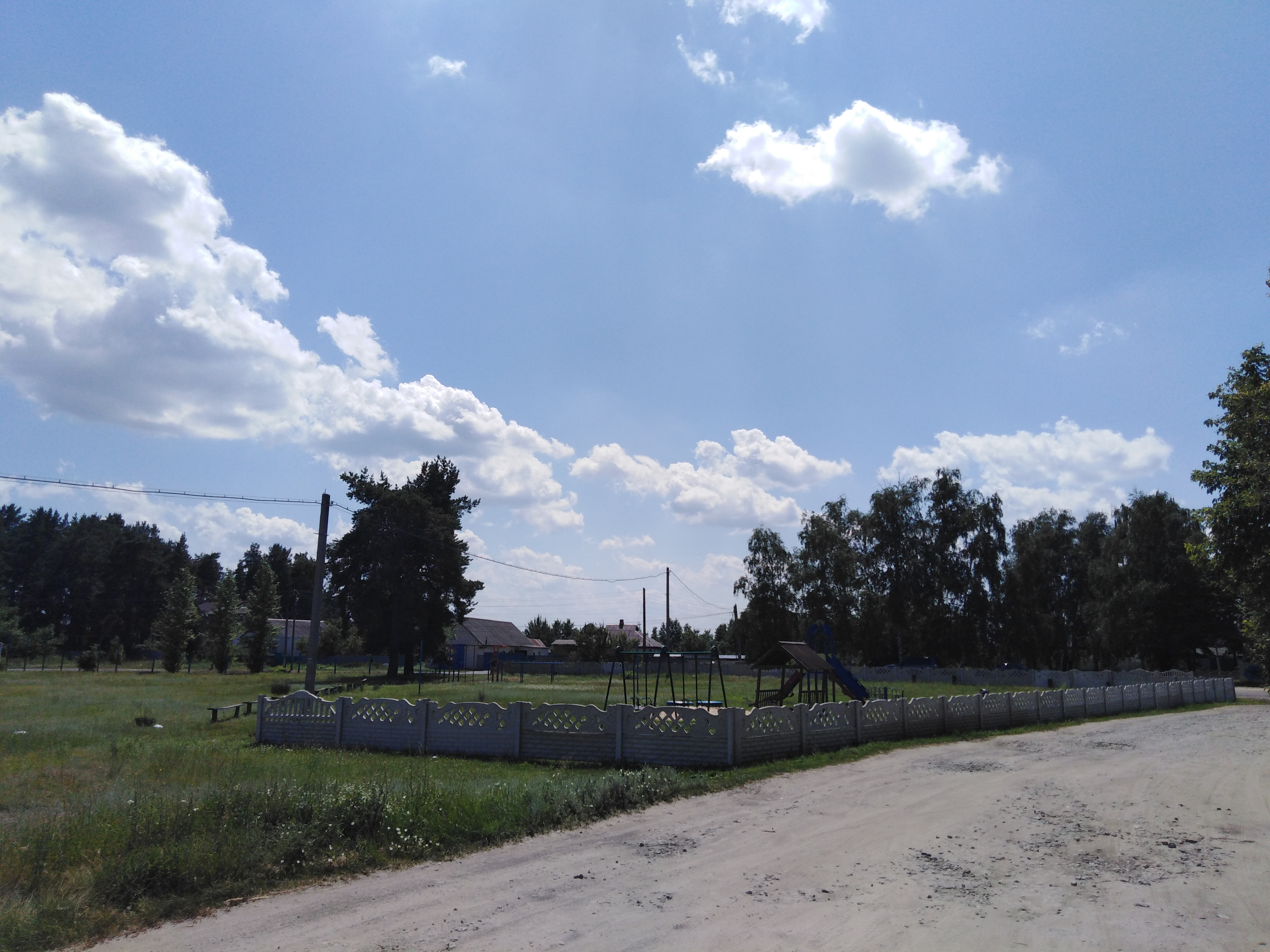

- Location in Kharkiv Oblast Location in Ukraine
- Coordinates: 49°41′54″N 36°24′10″E
- Country: Ukraine
- Oblast: Kharkiv Oblast
- Raion: Chuhuiv Raion

Population (2022)
  - Total: 3,669
- Time zone: UTC+2 (EET)
  - Summer (DST): UTC+3 (EEST)

Zidky (Ukrainian: Зідьки, Russian: Зидьки) is a rural settlement in Chuhuiv Raion of Kharkiv Oblast in Ukraine. It is located on the right bank of the Donets. Zidky belongs to Zmiiv urban hromada, one of the hromadas of Ukraine. Population: 3,669 (2022 estimate).

== History ==
Until 18 July 2020, Zidky belonged to Zmiiv Raion. The raion was abolished in July 2020 as part of the administrative reform of Ukraine, which reduced the number of raions of Kharkiv Oblast to seven. The area of Zmiiv Raion was merged into Chuhuiv Raion.

Until 26 January 2024, Zidky was designated urban-type settlement. On this day, a new law entered into force which abolished this status, and Zidky became a rural settlement.

== Economy ==
=== Transportation ===
Zidky railway station is on the railway connecting Kharkiv and Lyman via Izium. There is some passenger traffic.

Zidky is connected by roads with Kharkiv and with Izium.
