= Lymanivka =

Rural locality in Kharkiv Oblast, Ukraine

Lymanivka Лиманівка
- Rural settlement
- Location in Kharkiv Oblast Location in Ukraine
- Coordinates: 48°56′13″N 36°16′47″E
- Country: Ukraine
- Oblast: Kharkiv Oblast
- Raion: Lozova Raion

Population (2022)
  - Total: 6,869
- Time zone: UTC+2 (EET)
  - Summer (DST): UTC+3 (EEST)

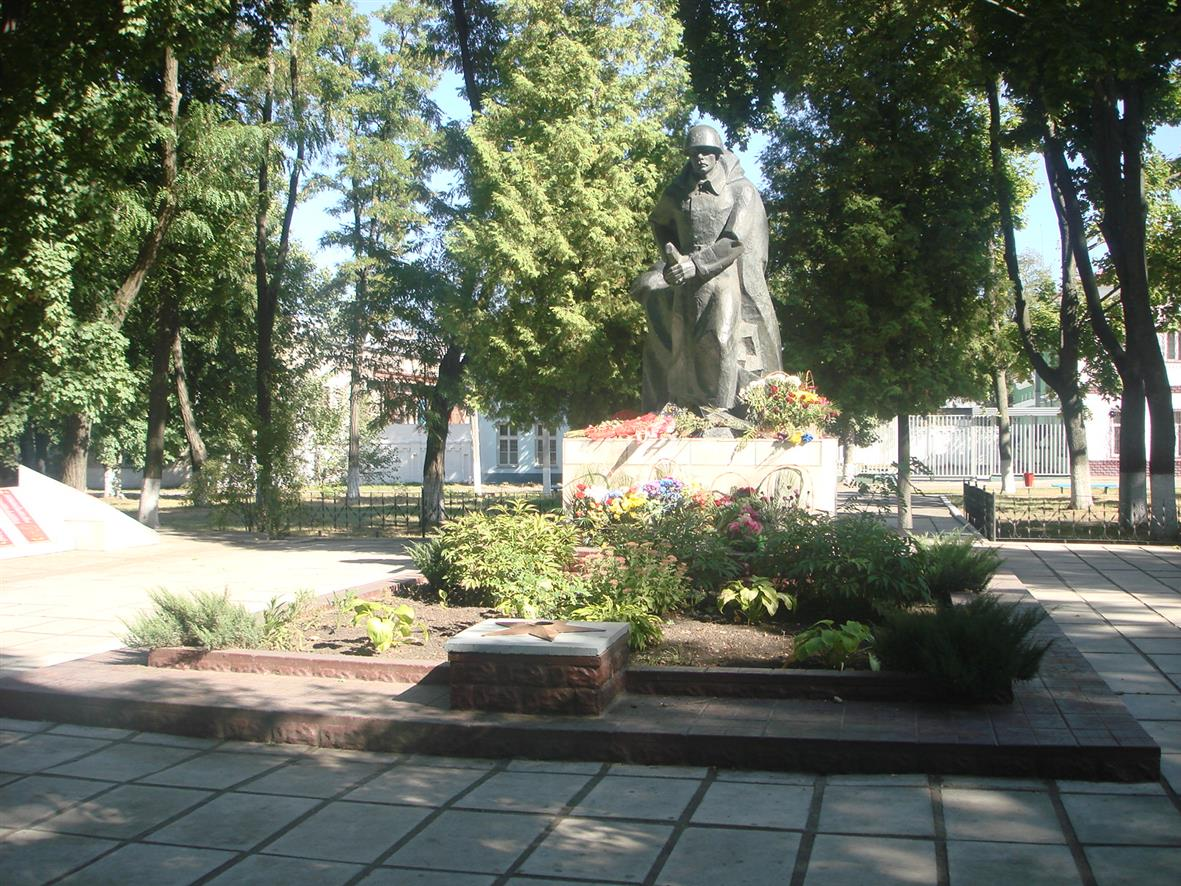
Mass grave of Soviet soldiers, where 456 were buried

Lymanivka (Ukrainian: Лиманівка), formerly Paniutyne (Ukrainian: Панютине, Russian: Панютино) is a rural settlement in Lozova Raion of Kharkiv Oblast in Ukraine. It is essentially a northern suburb of the city of Lozova. Lymanivka belongs to Lozova urban hromada, one of the hromadas of Ukraine. Population: 6,869 (2022 estimate). Population is about 3 thousand as of the end of 2024.

== History ==
Until 18 July 2020, Paniutyne belonged to city of oblast significance and the center of Lozova Municipality. The municipality was abolished in July 2020 as part of the administrative reform of Ukraine, which reduced the number of raions of Kharkiv Oblast to seven. The area of Lozova Municipality was merged into Lozova Raion.

Until 26 January 2024, Paniutyne was designated urban-type settlement. On this day, a new law entered into force which abolished this status, and Paniutyne became a rural settlement.

On 19 September 2024, the Verkhovna Rada voted to rename Paniutyne to Lymanivka.

== Economy ==
=== Transportation ===
Paniutyne railway station is on the railway connecting Kharkiv and Lozova. There is intensive passenger traffic.

The settlement has road access to Pavlohrad via Lozova and to Kharkiv.
