= Valky Raion =

Former subdivision of Kharkiv Oblast, Ukraine

Valky Raion Валківський район
- Raion
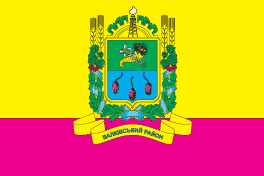
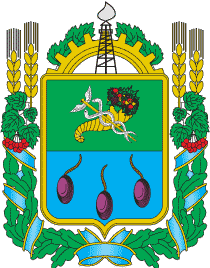
- Flag Coat of arms

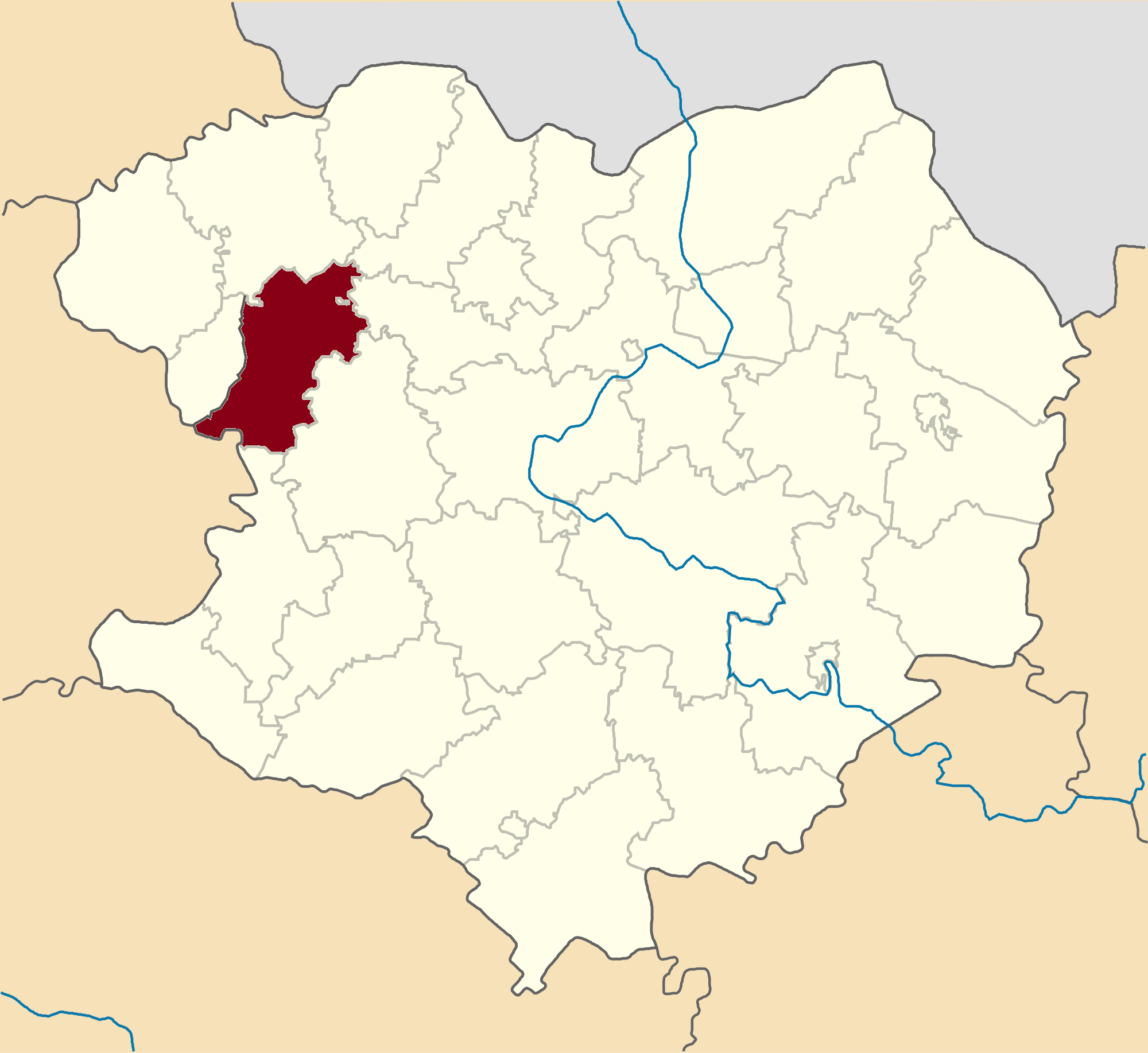
- Raion location in Kharkiv Oblast
- Coordinates: 49°50′19.2624″N 35°34′43.1328″E
- Country: Ukraine
- Oblast: Kharkiv Oblast
- Disestablished: 18 July 2020
- Admin. center: Valky

Area
  - Total: 1,010.5 km^{2} (390.2 sq mi)

Population (2020)
  - Total: 30,791
  - Density: 30.471/km^{2} (78.920/sq mi)
- Time zone: UTC+2 (EET)
  - Summer (DST): UTC+3 (EEST)
- Website: http://valky-rda.at.ua/

Valky Raion (Ukrainian: Валківський район) was a raion (district) in Kharkiv Oblast of Ukraine. Its administrative center was the town of Valky. The raion was abolished on 18 July 2020 as part of the administrative reform of Ukraine, which reduced the number of raions of Kharkiv Oblast to seven. The area of Valky Raion was merged into Bohodukhiv Raion. The last estimate of the raion population was 30,791 (2020 est.)

In 1920 the raion was the centre of an anti-Bolshevik uprising. A peasant army, of according to various estimates, 1,500 to 3,500 people proclaimed a "Ukrainian People's Government" in April 1920, but was defeated early May 1920 after a failed attempt to capture Valky and its members were executed.

At the time of disestablishment, the raion consisted of one hromada, Valky urban hromada with the administration in Valky.
