= Valky =

City in Kharkiv Oblast, Ukraine

Valky Валки
- City
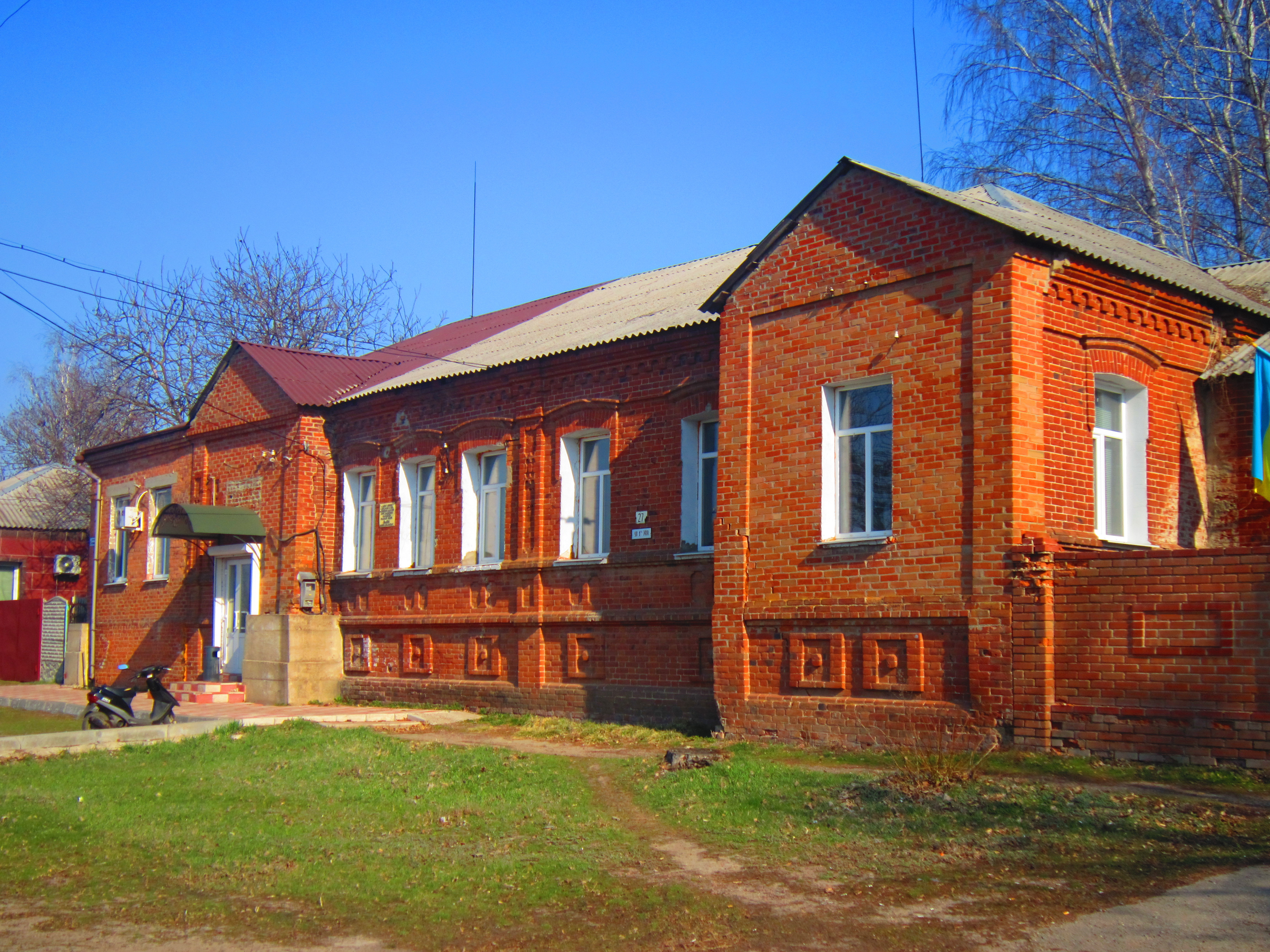

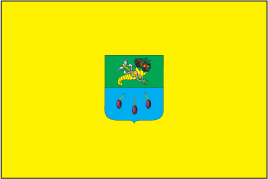
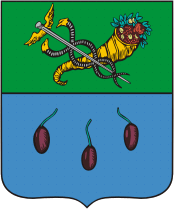
- Flag Coat of arms
- Interactive map of Valky
- Location within Kharkiv Oblast Location within Ukraine
- Coordinates: 49°50′N 35°37′E
- Country: Ukraine
- Oblast: Kharkiv Oblast
- Raion: Bohodukhiv Raion
- Hromada: Valky urban hromada

Population (2001)
  - Total: 10,381
- Time zone: UTC+2 (EET)
  - Summer (DST): UTC+3 (EEST)

Valky (Ukrainian and Russian: Валки) is a city in Bohodukhiv Raion, Kharkiv Oblast, Ukraine. Valky is situated on the banks of the river Mzha. The city borders on such villages as Kostiv and Hontiv Yar. It hosts the administration of Valky urban hromada, one of the hromadas of Ukraine. Population: 8,577 (2022 estimate). It is located in the historic region of Sloboda Ukraine.

Until 18 July 2020, Valky was the administrative center of Valky Raion. The raion was abolished in July 2020 as part of the administrative reform of Ukraine, which reduced the number of raions of Kharkiv Oblast to seven. The area of Valky Raion was merged into Bohodukhiv Raion.

== Geography ==
The settlement is located on the Mozh river, a tributary of Siversky Donets.

== History ==
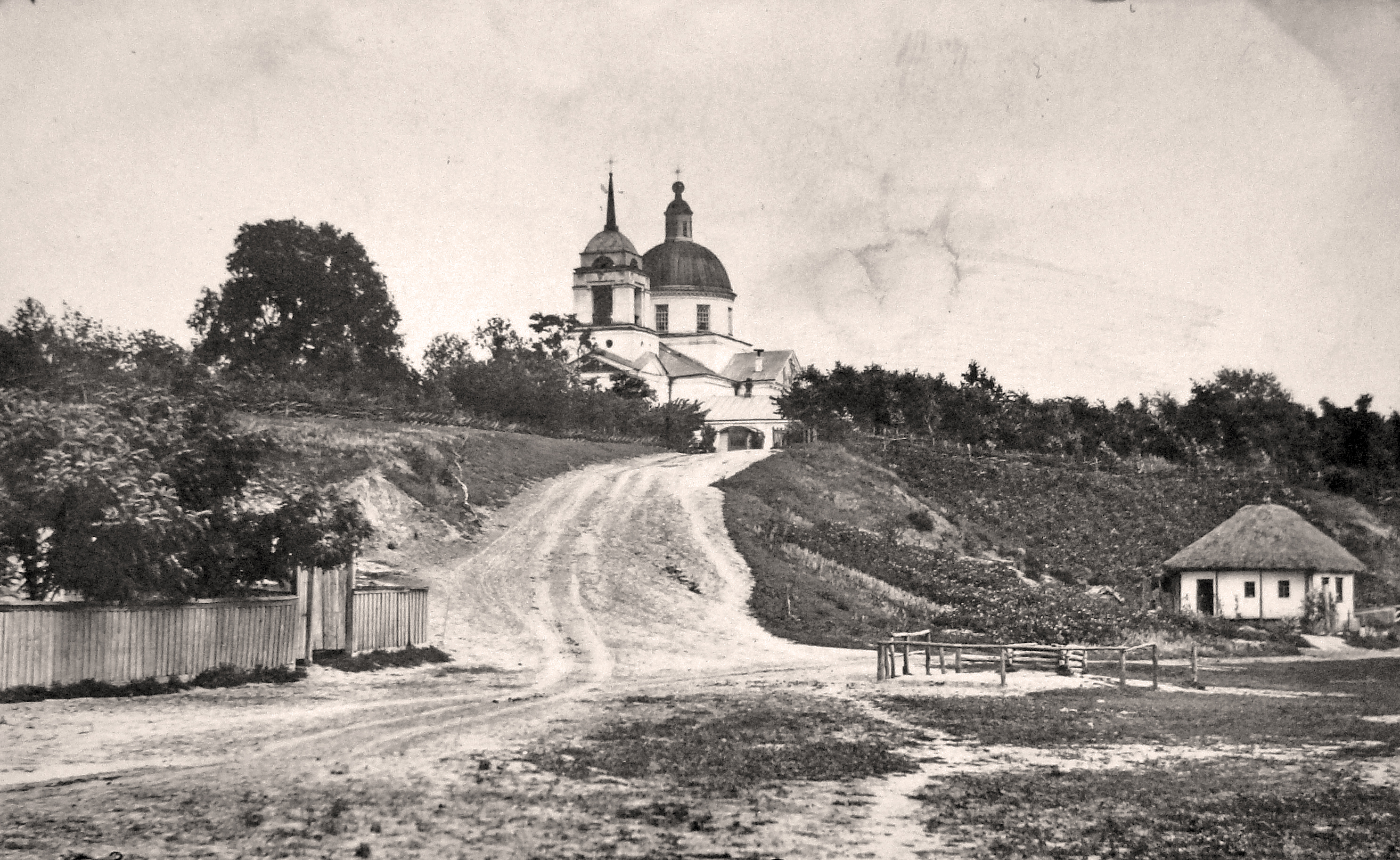
Annunciation Church in c. 1914

The settlement was founded during the first half of the 17th century as a stronghold defending the area from Tatars. Later Valky served as a Cossack sotnia centre of Kharkiv Regiment in Sloboda Ukraine. Between 1780 and 1920 the town was a povit centre.

In May 1920, a peasant army of the surrounding villages, according to various estimates, 1,500 to 3,500 people who had proclaimed a "Ukrainian People's Government" attempted to capture Valky. They failed due to a lack of weapons, and its members were executed. Afterwards it was administratively part of the Kharkiv Governorate of Ukraine.

During World War II, it was occupied by Germany from 1941 to 1943.

On June 12, 2020, according to the Resolution of the Cabinet of Ministers of Ukraine No. 725-r "On the Determination of Administrative Centers and Approval of Territories of Territorial Communities of the Kharkiv Oblast", it became part of the Valkivska City Community.

On July 17, 2020, as a result of the administrative-territorial reform and the liquidation of the Valky district, the city became part of the Bohodukhiv Raion.

In 2021, a national record was set in Valky: 375 people made a simultaneous whistle on a traditional clay toy, the Valky whistle.

== Economy ==
Due to the lack of railway connections, the settlement didn't experience significant growth since the 19th century. Some small-scale industry and a veterinary school are located in the town.

== Demographics ==
In 1897 the town's population reached 8,900 inhabitants, but by 1926 it had declined to 8,500. As of the 2001 Ukrainian census, the town had a population of 10,295. The ethnic composition was as follows:

Ethnic groups in Valky
	percent
Ukrainians	94.63%
Russians	4.34%
Belarusians	0.37%
Armenians	0.21%
others	0.45%
