= Zolochiv, Kharkiv Oblast =

Rural locality in Kharkiv Oblast, Ukraine

Zolochiv Золочів
- Rural settlement
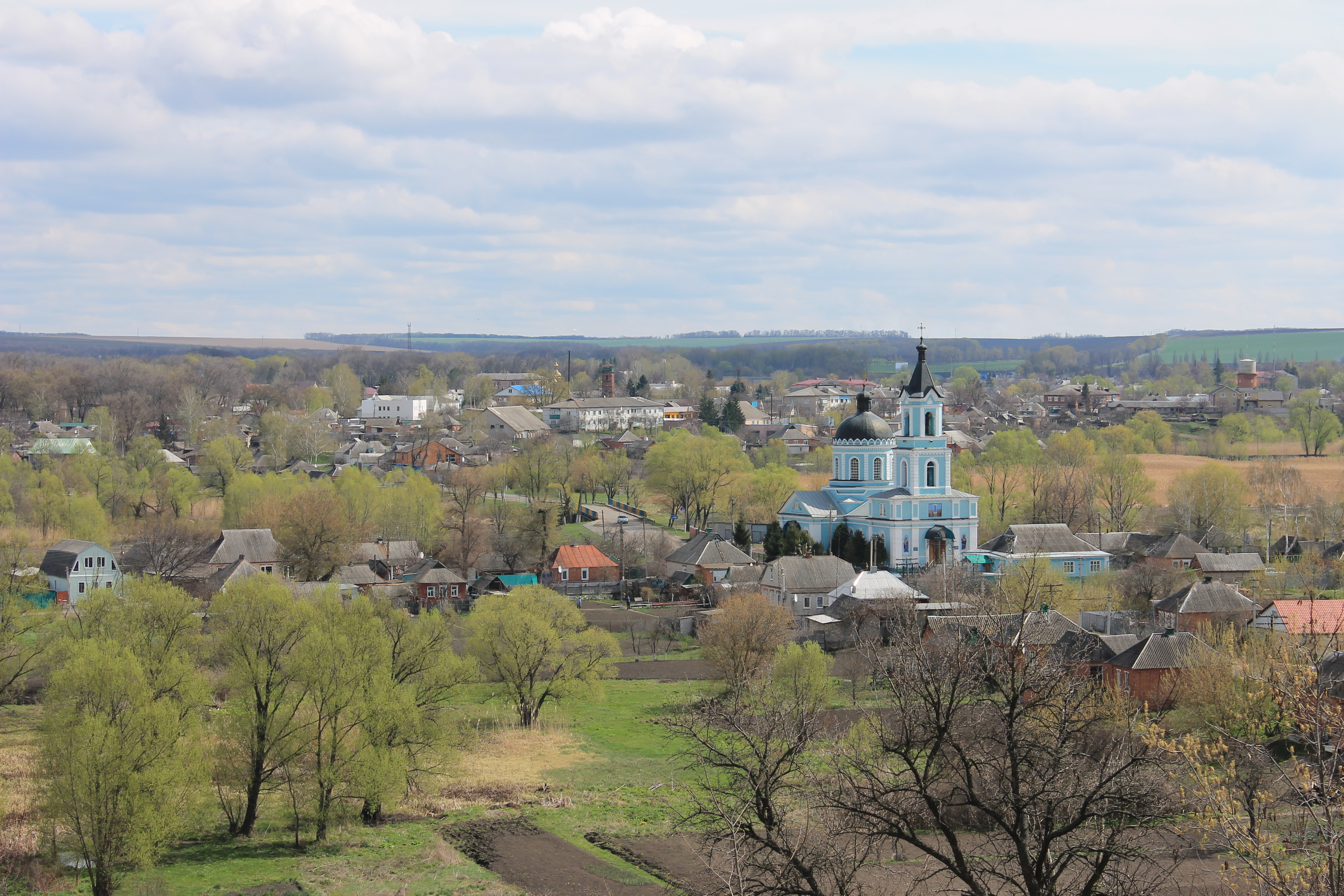
- Panorama of Zolochiv

- Flag Coat of arms
- Interactive map of Zolochiv
- Location of Zolochiv Zolochiv (Ukraine)
- Coordinates: 50°17′00″N 35°58′12″E
- Country: Ukraine
- Oblast: Kharkiv Oblast
- Raion: Bohodukhiv Raion
- Founded: 1677

Population (2022)
  - Total: 7,744
- Time zone: UTC+2 (CET)
  - Summer (DST): UTC+3 (CEST)
- Postal code: 62200-62209

Zolochiv (Ukrainian: Золочів) is a rural settlement in Bohodukhiv Raion, Kharkiv Oblast, Ukraine. It hosts the administration of Zolochiv settlement hromada, one of the hromadas of Ukraine. Population: 7,744 (2022 estimate).

== History ==
This settlement was founded in 1677 by Cossack settlers from Right-bank Ukraine. It was a town in Kharkov Uyezd of Kharkov Governorate of the Russian Empire.

During the Ukrainian War of Independence, from 1917 to 1920, it passed between various factions. Afterwards it was administratively part of the Kharkiv Governorate of Ukraine. A local newspaper is published here since 1931.

During World War II it was under German occupation from October 1941 to August 1943.

Until 18 July 2020, Zolochiv was the administrative center of Zolochiv Raion. The raion was abolished in July 2020 as part of the administrative reform of Ukraine, which reduced the number of raions of Kharkiv Oblast to seven. The area of Zolochiv Raion was merged into Bohodukhiv Raion.

During the Russia-Ukraine war, the Zolochiv community was actively shelled by Russian artillery.

Until 26 January 2024, Zolochiv was designated urban-type settlement. On this day, a new law entered into force which abolished this status, and Zolochiv became a rural settlement.

== Geography ==
Zolochiv is located in the north-west of the Kharkiv region, 41 km northwest of Kharkiv. The settlement is located 25 km from the border with Russia (Belgorod Oblast).

Zolochiv is located on the Central Russian Upland, within the forest steppe natural zone. It is part of the historical region of Sloboda Ukraine.

The climate of the Zolochiv is temperate continental with cold winters and hot summers. The average annual temperature is +8.7 °C (in January -4.5, in July +22). The average annual rainfall is 520 mm. The highest rainfall occurs in the summer. There are large forests (pine and deciduous trees) near Zolochiv. The soils of are chernozems and meadow soils.

Zolochiv is located on the Udy, a left tributary of the Donets.

== Demographics ==
As of the Ukrainian national census in 2001, Zolochiv had a population of 11,495 inhabitants. The linguistic composition of the population was as follows:

Native languages in Zolochiv
	percent
Ukrainian	92.4%
Russian	7.0%
Armenian	0.3%
Belarusian	0.2%
others	0.1%

Historical population
Year	Pop.	±%
1989	12,878	—
2013	9,012	−30.0%

== Economics and infrastructure ==
Zolochiv is a centre of sugar industry and alcohol production. A brick factory is located in the settlement.

А railway station of the Southern railway is located in Zolochiv.
