= Udy (river) =

Udy Uda
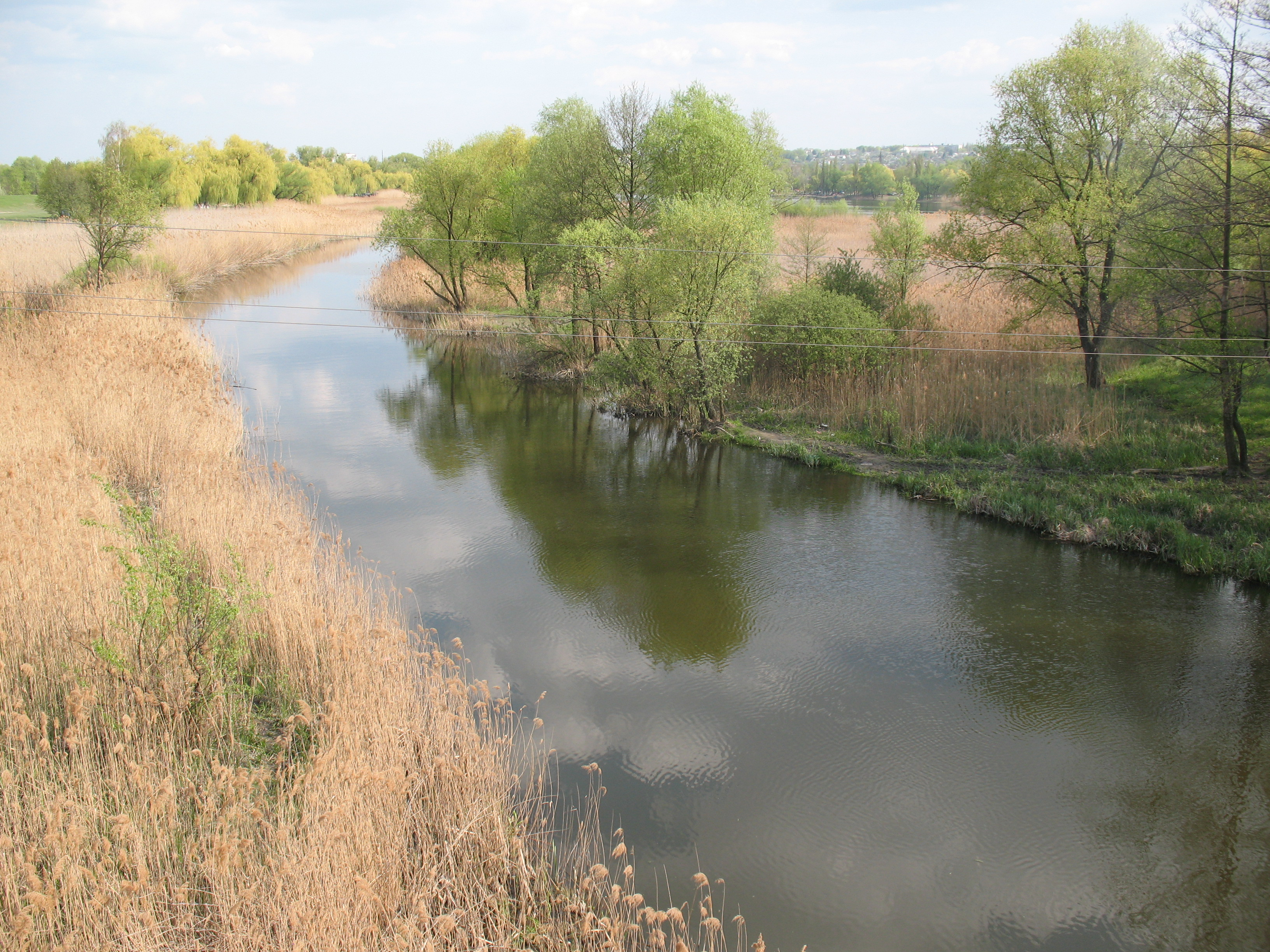
- The river in spring
- Native name: Уды (Russian); Уда (Ukrainian)

Location
- Country: Russia, Ukraine

Physical characteristics
- Mouth: Donets
  - coordinates: 49.7983°N 36.6119°E
- Length: 164 km (102 mi)
- Basin size: 3,890 km^{2} (1,500 sq mi)

Basin features
- Progression: Donets→ Don→ Sea of Azov

The Udy or Uda (Russian: Уды; Ukrainian: Уда, also Уди), is a river that rises in Belgorod Oblast of Russia and runs through Kharkiv Oblast of Ukraine. It is a right tributary of the Siversky Donets near Chuhuiv. Its length is 164 kilometres (102 mi). The drainage basin occupies 3,890 square kilometres (1,500 sq mi). The second largest city of Ukraine, Kharkiv, stands at the confluence of the Udy with the river Lopan.

== Physical geography ==
The source of the river begins with springs in one of the beams Central Russian Upland near the village Bessonovka Belgorodsky District Belgorod Oblast (Russia) at an altitude of 190 m above sea level. The river crosses the border with Russia to the northeast of the village of Okip in Bohodukhiv Raion Kharkiv Oblast. From the source to the confluence of the river Lopan flows from north to south, and below - in a south-easterly direction. The Udy flows into the river Siverskyi Donets 825 km from its mouth. Within the Kharkiv Oblast it flows along Bohodukhiv, Kharkiv, Chuhuiv raions and through the city of Kharkiv.

The total length of the Udy River is 164 km (127 km within the Kharkiv Oblast). The catchment area is 3894 km2 (in the Kharkiv Oblast 3460 km2). The total height difference (from the source to the mouth is 105 m, the average river slopeis 0.64 m/km.

On the river there are cities Zolochiv and Kharkiv.

== Gallery ==
Udy
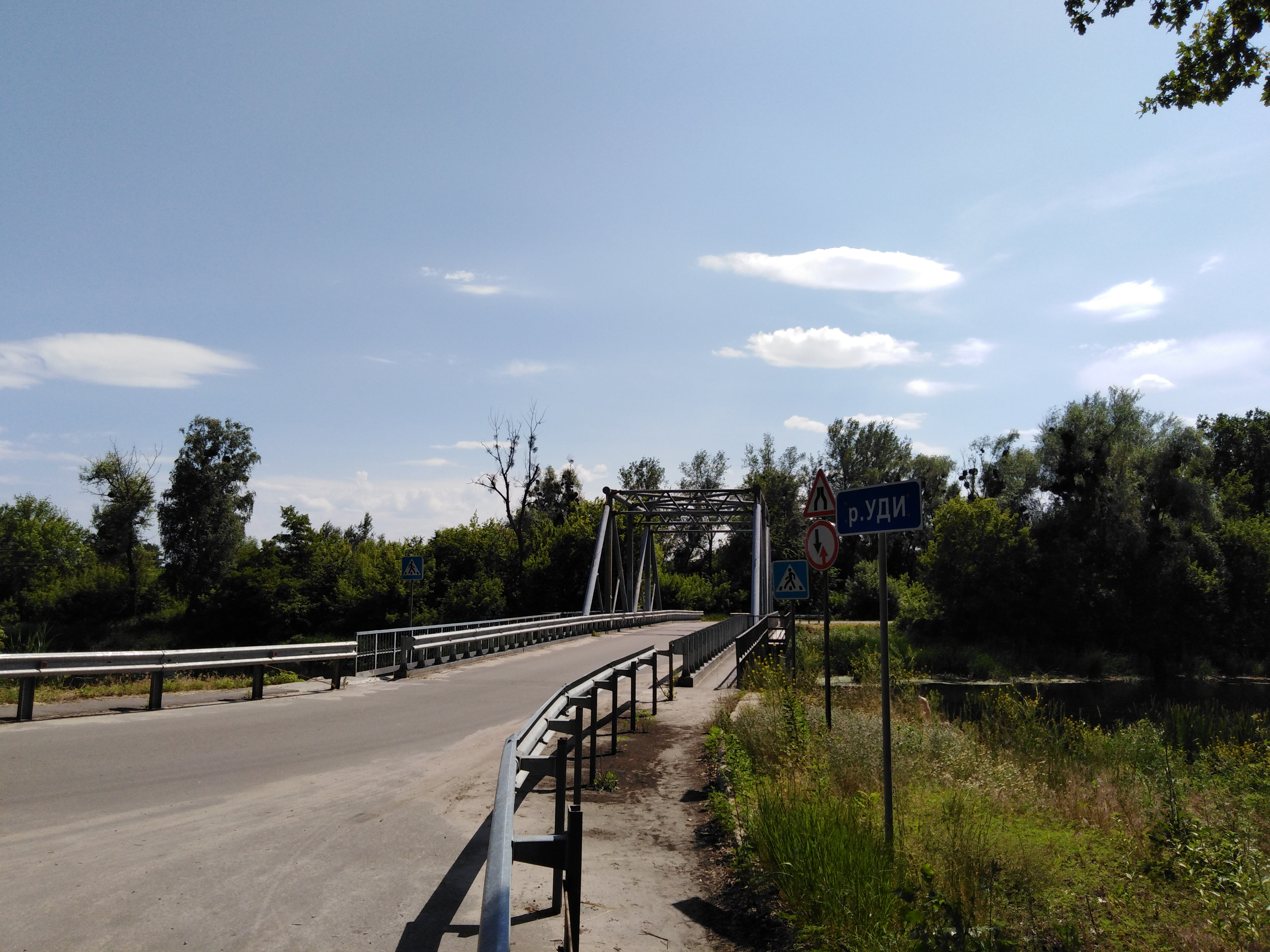
Bridge over the Udy River, between the villages Gusyna Polyana (Chuhuiv Raion) and Vasyshcheve (Kharkiv Raion)

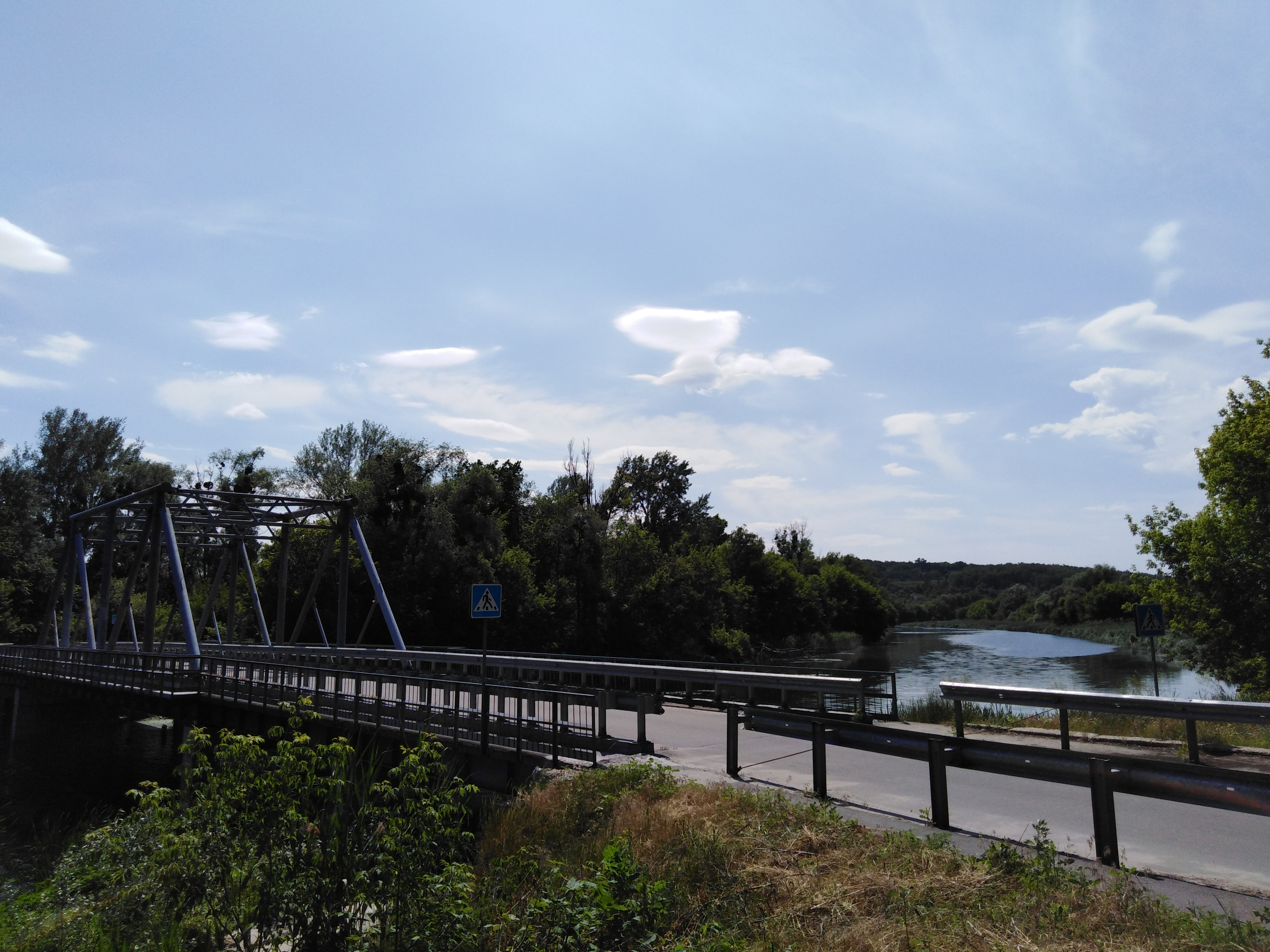
Bridge over the Udy River, between the villages Gusyna Polyana (Chuhuiv Raion) and Vasyshcheve (Kharkiv Raion)

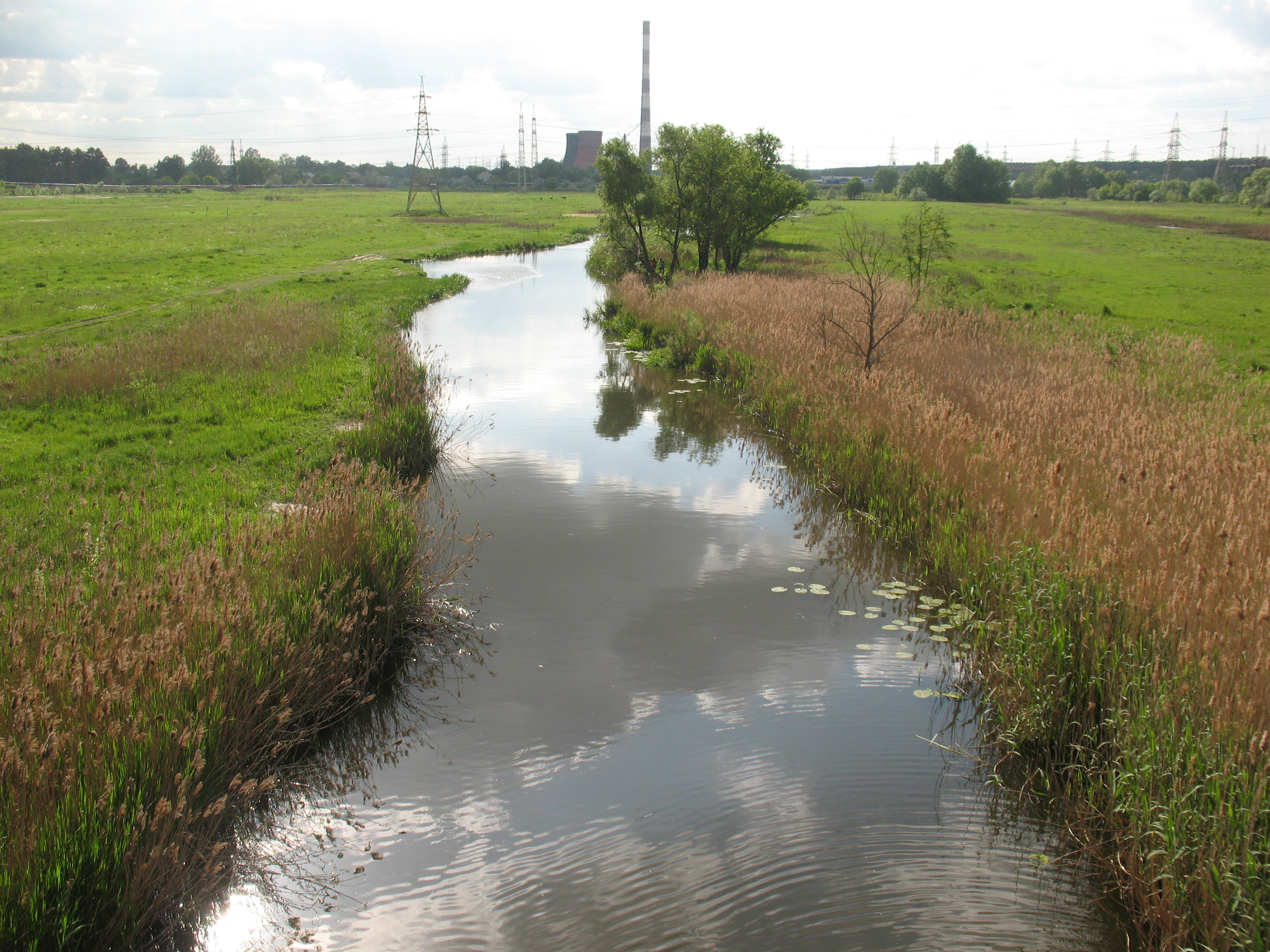
Udy River, next to Kharkiv TEC-5

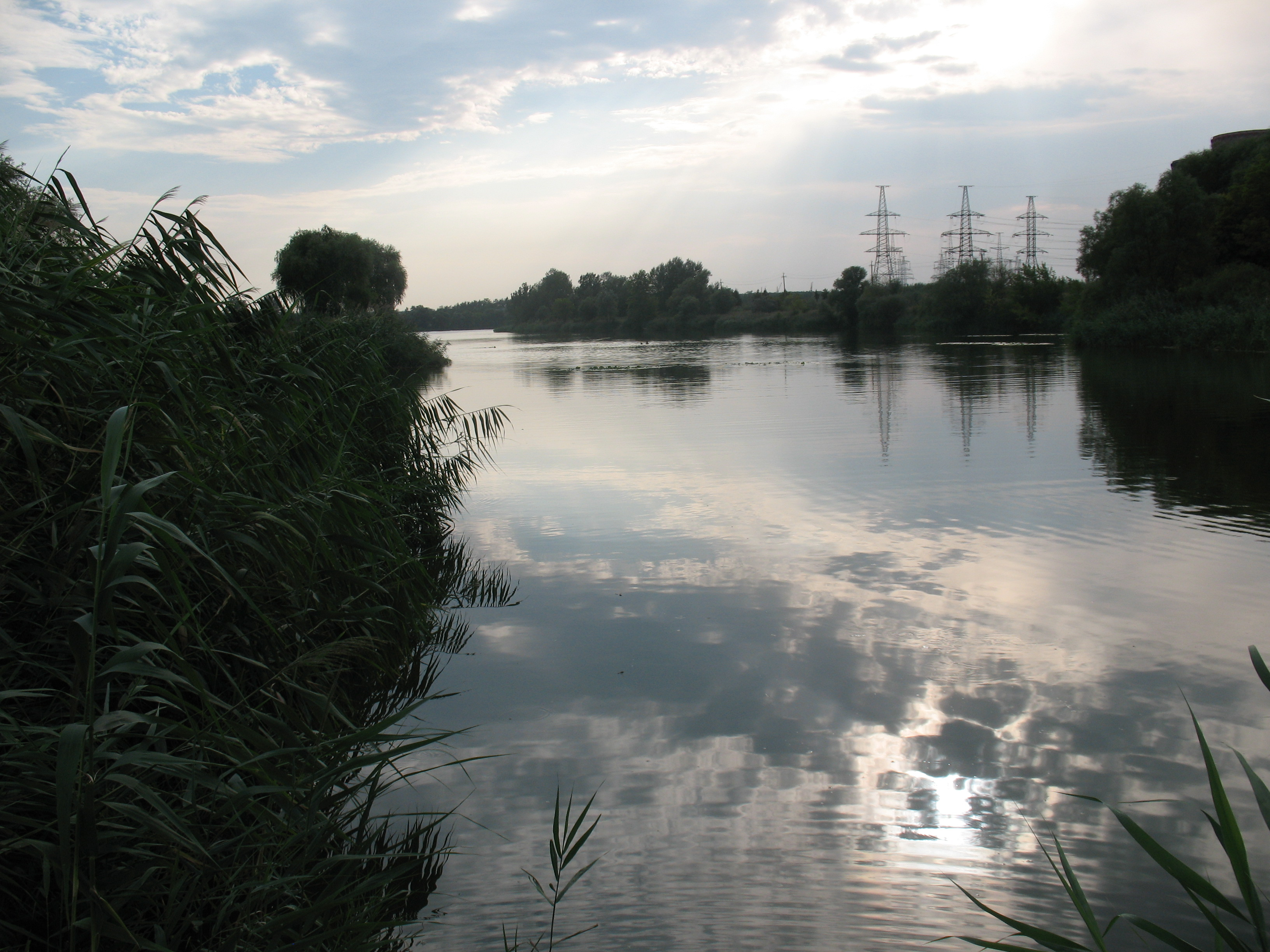
Udy River, near the Overhead power line, Kharkiv TEC-5

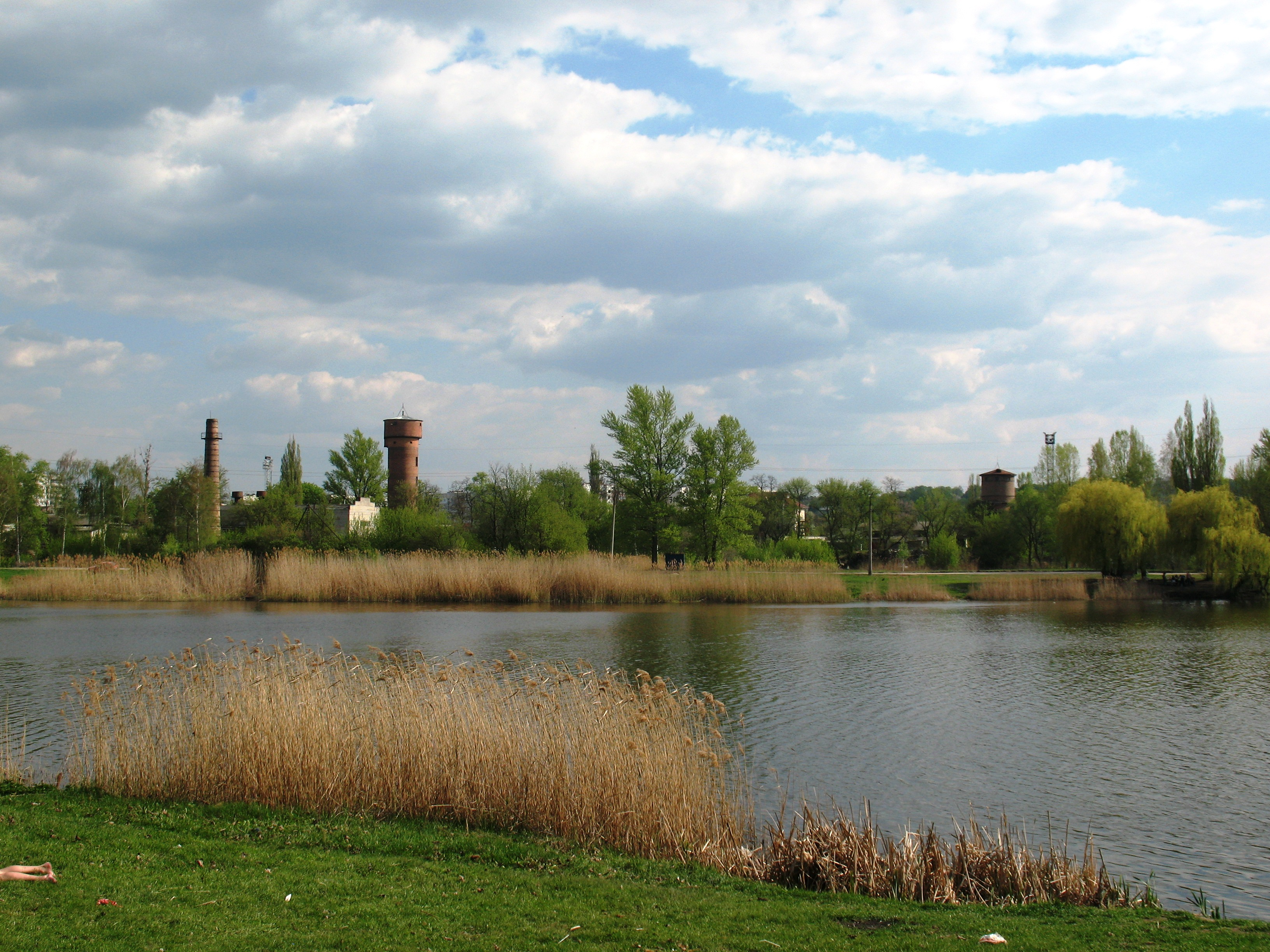
Udy River. Kharkiv, locality New Bavaria, October hydropark. View from the left bank of the river on the right
