= Bohodukhiv Raion =

Subdivision of Kharkiv Oblast, Ukraine

Bohodukhiv Raion Богодухівський район
- Raion
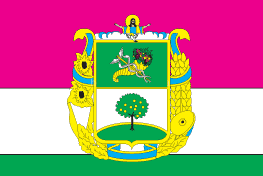
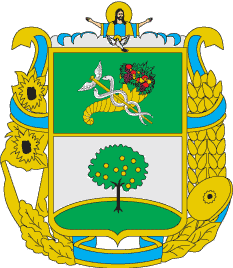
- Flag Coat of arms

- Raion location in Kharkiv Oblast
- Coordinates: 50°9′16.5708″N 35°31′42.5172″E
- Country: Ukraine
- Oblast: Kharkiv Oblast
- Admin. center: Bohodukhiv
- Subdivisions: 5 hromadas

Area
  - Total: 4,508.1 km^{2} (1,740.6 sq mi)

Population (2022)
  - Total: 122,287
  - Density: 27.126/km^{2} (70.256/sq mi)
- Time zone: UTC+2 (EET)
  - Summer (DST): UTC+3 (EEST)
- Website: bogodukhivrda.gov.ua

Bohodukhiv Raion (Ukrainian: Богодухівський район) is a raion (district) in Kharkiv Oblast of Ukraine. Its administrative center is the town of Bohodukhiv. Population: 122,287 (2022 estimate).

On 18 July 2020, as part of the administrative reform of Ukraine, the number of raions of Kharkiv Oblast was reduced to seven, and the area of Bohodukhiv Raion was significantly expanded. The January 2020 estimate of the raion population was 37,563 (2020 est.).

== Subdivisions ==
=== Current ===
After the reform in July 2020, the raion consisted of 5 hromadas:

- Bohodukhiv urban hromada with the administration in the city of Bohodukhiv, retained from Bohodukhiv Raion;
- Kolomak settlement hromada with the administration in the rural settlement of Kolomak, transferred from Kolomak Raion;
- Krasnokutsk settlement hromada with the administration in the rural settlement of Krasnokutsk, transferred from Krasnokutsk Raion;
- Valky urban hromada with the administration in the city of Valky, transferred from Valky Raion;
- Zolochiv settlement hromada with the administration in the rural settlement of Zolochiv, transferred from Zolochiv Raion.

=== Before 2020 ===
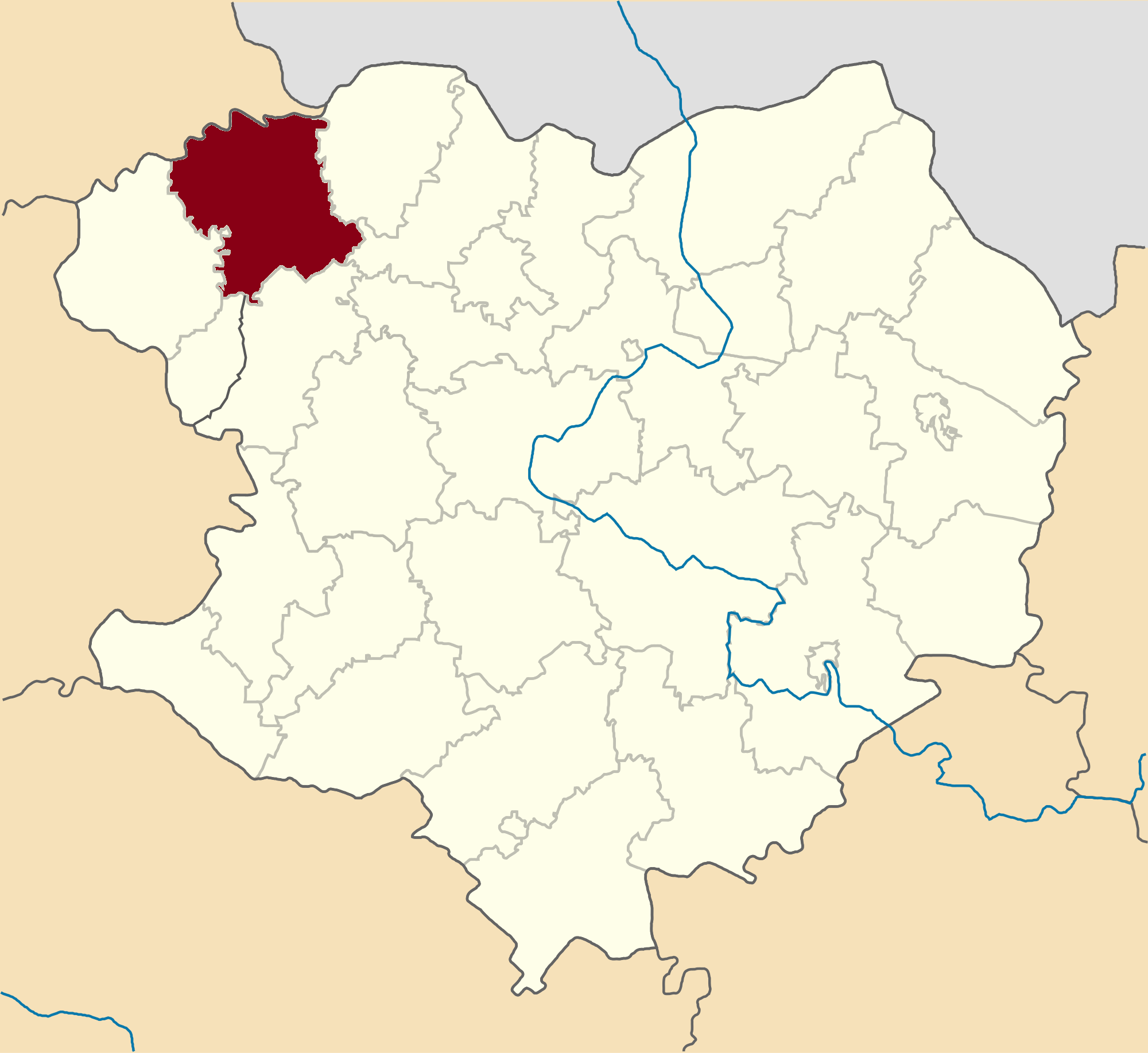
Bohodukhiv Raion in Kharkiv Oblast before 2020

Before the 2020 reform, the raion consisted of one hromada, Bohodukhiv urban hromada with the administration in Bohodukhiv.

== Geography ==
The Bohodukhiv Raion is located in the north-west of the Kharkiv region. The Raion borders Russia (Belgorod Oblast) to the north, Poltava Oblast to the west and Sumy Oblast to the northwest.

The territory of the district is located on the Central Russian Upland and the Poltava Plain, within the forest-steppe natural zone. The relief of the district is an undulating plain with ravines and gullies. The highest point of the Kharkiv region, with a height of 236 m, is located in the Bogodukhov district.

The climate of the raion is temperate continental with cold winters and hot summers. The average annual temperature is +8.7 °C (in January -4.5, in July +22). The average annual rainfall is 520 mm. The highest rainfall occurs in the summer. There are large forest areas (pine and deciduous trees) on the territory of the raion. The soils of the community are chernozems and meadow soils.

The watershed between the Dnieper and Don basins runs through the Bohodukhiv Raion. The main rivers of the district are: Merla, a left tributary of the Dnieper, and Udy, a left tributary of the Donets.

Mineral resources of the Bohodukhiv Raion: loams, clays, sandstones, peat, natural gas.
