= Troyan (disambiguation) =

Troyan (Bulgarian: Троян) is a town in Bulgaria.

Troyan may also refer to:

== Places ==
- Troyan Municipality, in Lovech Province, Bulgaria
- Troyan (village), in Simeonovgrad municipality, Haskovo Province, Bulgaria
- Troyan Peak, in Antarctica
- Troyan Pass, a mountain pass in the Balkan Mountains
- Troyan Monastery, Bulgaria

== People ==
- Troyan (surname), including a list of people with the name
- Troyan Radulov (born 1974), a Bulgarian footballer

== See also ==
- Troyano (disambiguation)
- Trojan (disambiguation)
- Troian (disambiguation)
- Trayan (disambiguation)
