= Troyan (surname) =

Troyan is a surname. Notable people with this surname include:

- Sergei Troyan (born 1984), Russian footballer
- Sue Troyan, American basketball coach
- Vadym Troyan (born 1979), Ukrainian politician

== See also ==
- Troian (disambiguation)
- Trayan
- Trojan
- Trajan
