= Vadym Troyan =

Ukrainian military personnel

Vadym Troyan Вадим Троян
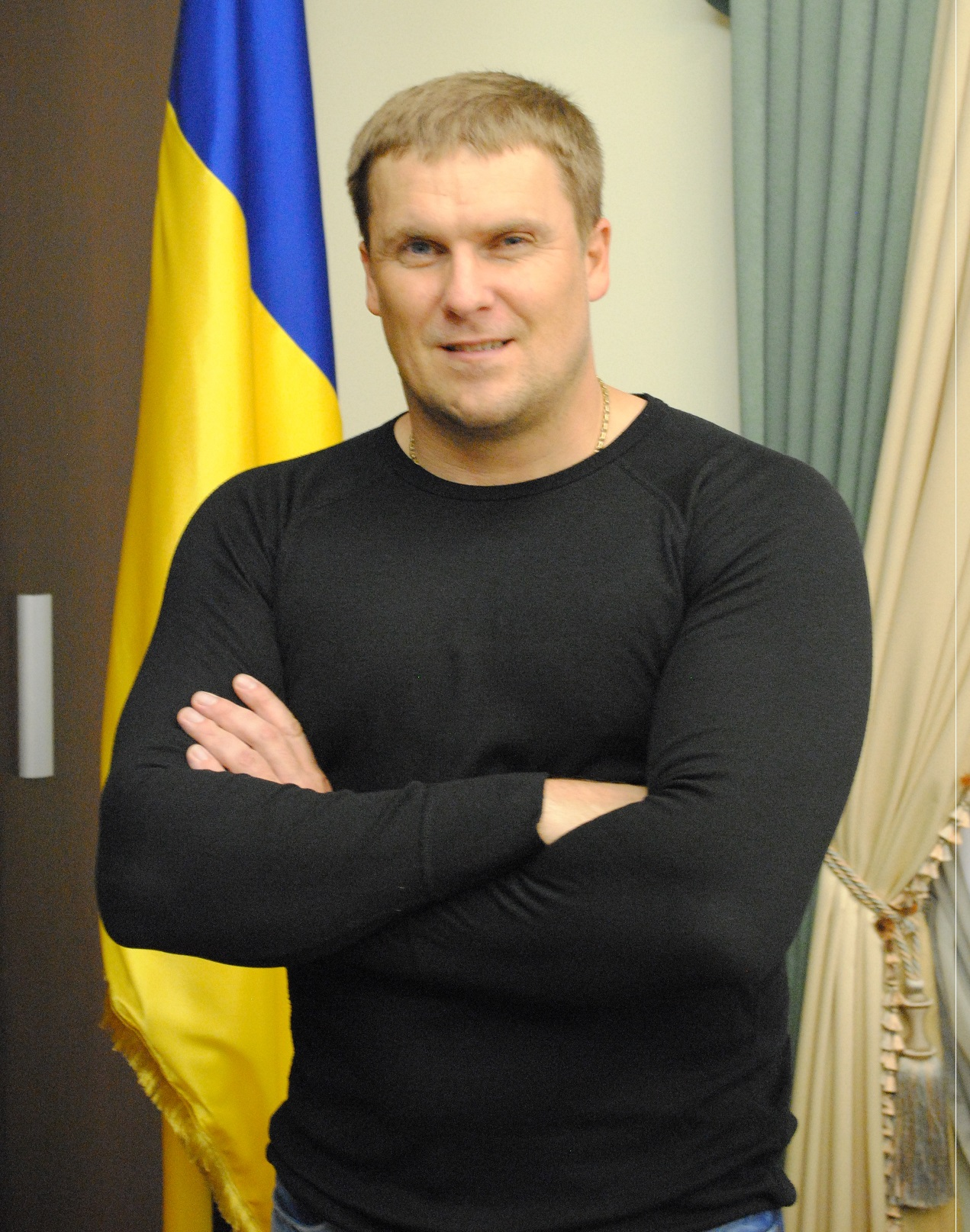
- Vadym Troyan

Deputy Minister of Internal Affairs
- In office 8 February 2017 – 6 September 2019

Chief of the National Police (acting)
- In office 14 November 2015 – 8 February 2017
- Preceded by: Khatia Dekanoidze
- Succeeded by: Serhiy Knyazev

First Deputy Chief of the National Police
- In office 4 March 2015 – 5 November 2021

Head of the Main Directorate of the National Police in the Kyiv Region
- In office 7 November 2015 – 4 March 2016
- Preceded by: post established
- Succeeded by: Dmytro Mykolayovych Tsinov

Head of the Main Department of the Ministry of Internal Affairs in the Kyiv Region
- In office 30 October 2014 – 6 November 2015
- Preceded by: Yaroslav Yaroslavovych Holomsha
- Succeeded by: post abolished

Chief of Staff of the Azov Battalion
- In office June – October 2014
- Preceded by: post established
- Succeeded by: Andriy Klos (acting)

Personal details
- Born: Vadym Anatoliyovych Troyan; 12 September 1979 (age 47) Orilka, Kharkiv Oblast, Ukrainian SSR
- Party: People's Front (2014-currently)
- Education: Kharkiv National University of Internal Affairs

Military service
- Allegiance: Ukraine
- Branch/service: National Police
- Years of service: 2014–present
- Rank: Police Colonel
- Unit: Azov Battalion (2014)
- Battles/wars: Russo-Ukrainian War

Vadym Anatoliyovych Troyan (Ukrainian: Вади́м Анато́лійович Троя́н; born 12 September 1979) is a Ukrainian former government official and military leader. He was the chief of police for the Kyiv Oblast from 2014 to 2021, and formerly the deputy commander of the Azov Battalion with the rank of colonel.

== Biography ==
Troyan was born on 12 September 1979 in a village Orilka, Lozova Raion, Kharkiv Oblast, Ukrainian SSR. In 2000 he graduated in law from Kharkiv National University. Until 2003 he served as an investigator at the Lozova district police station in Kharkiv Oblast.

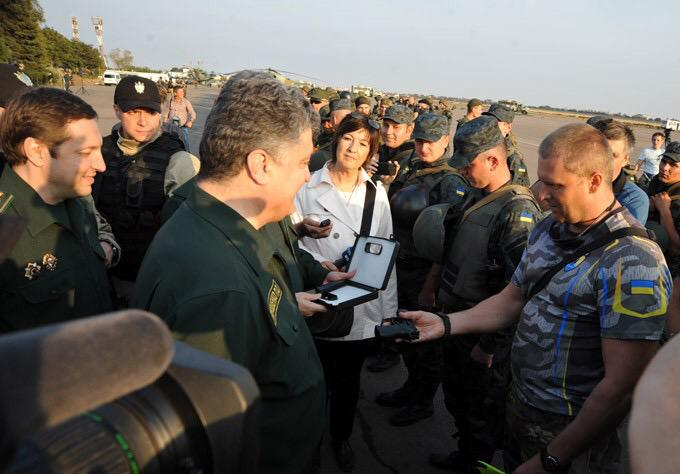
With Petro Poroshenko.

Since the beginning of the military operation in the Eastern region of Ukraine he defended the independence and the territorial integrity of Ukraine as deputy commander of the Azov Battalion, a far right all-volunteer infantry military unit which is accused of supporting neo-Nazi ideology.

He has been awarded the Order of Bohdan Khmelnytsky of the 3rd degree, as well as the personal award weapon and extraordinary special ranks. The Mariupol City Council has awarded him the title "Honorary citizen of Mariupol". May 2014 – September 2014 – the deputy battalion commander of "Azov" at the Ministry of Interior of Ukraine in the Kyiv region.

In November 2014 he was appointed to the post of police chief of the Kyiv Oblast by Minister of the Interior Arsen Avakov, a move that was strongly criticized by Ukraine's chief rabbi Yaakov Bleich, the Kharkiv Human Rights Protection Group and the Simon Wiesenthal Center; these groups, however, recognized that there is no specific evidence pointing to anti-Semitic views on the part of Troyan. Troyan denied connections to far-right ideologies.

He is one of the first officers who supports and works at the process of reforming of the Ministry of Interior. He has conducted the drastic personnel reform at the Police Department in the Kyiv region. He has released the District police departments` leaders who personally took part at the process of execution of criminal orders given by the government of Yanukovych. He has expressed the full mistrust to the leading staff of the Department for Economic Crimes` Combating of the Main Department, putting them on retention. With the purpose to study the situation in the region he holds "VECHE" – the joint meetings of the local authorities, NGOs, activists, police officers in the districts. These events gave the opportunity to set up an open dialogue between the Ministry of Interior and the public.

Within the frameworks of the law enforcement bodies' reform he is taking an active part in the creation of a new police force. Thanks to an introduced experiment on the district police departments in Vasylkiv and Obukhiv districts of the Kyiv region reorganization he brought the public service of the patrol service to a new level. The competitive recruitment into the police force was one of the first in Ukraine announced in the district town of Boryspil.

The new software has been developed in order to quickly respond to reports of citizens. The received information is being transferred to a system of a single line for all the districts. He has initiated the creation of a single regional line - 102. On 16 November 2016 Troyan was appointed acting Chief of the National Police of Ukraine.

On 8 February 2017 Troyan was appointed to the post of Deputy Minister of the Interior by the Groysman Government. He was dismissed from this position on 6 September 2019 by the new Honcharuk Government.

In November 2021 Troyan resigned from his position as Deputy Head of the National Police of Ukraine and was later dismissed from his other positions by the new Minister of the Interior Denys Monastyrsky.

== Controversies ==
The Kharkiv Human Rights Protection Group has accused Troyan of being a leading member of the neo-Nazi organizations Patriot of Ukraine and Social-National Assembly, both of which expound far-right and racist positions. The Jerusalem Post was not able to confirm such accusation, only confirming that he was a member of the People's Front, a mainstream centre-right political party led by Arseniy Yatseniuk. Speaking to the Kyiv Post, Troyan denied having connections to far-right organizations.

On 8 October 2016, Troyan published an opinion-article in the Ukrainian newspaper Dzerkalo Tyzhnia, claiming that the large number of refugees in Southern Ukraine and Eastern Ukraine coming from Crimea and Donbas was one of the causes of the increase of crime in those areas. The article received criticism from the Kharkiv Human Rights Protection Group, who accused Troyan of "unfairly blaming people forced to flee their homes because of Russia’s invasion of Crimea and military conflict in Donbas".
