= Blyzniuky =

Rural locality in Kharkiv Oblast, Ukraine

Blyzniuky Близнюки
- Rural settlement
- Location within Kharkiv Oblast
- Coordinates: 48°51′24″N 36°33′18″E
- Country: Ukraine
- Oblast: Kharkiv Oblast
- Raion: Lozova Raion

Population (2022)
  - Total: 3,467
- Time zone: UTC+2 (EET)
  - Summer (DST): UTC+3 (EEST)

Blyzniuky (Ukrainian: Близнюки, Russian: Близнюки) is a rural settlement in Lozova Raion, Kharkiv Oblast, Ukraine. It hosts the administration of Blyzniuky settlement hromada, one of the hromadas of Ukraine. Population: 3,467 (2022 estimate).

The settlement is located in the south of the oblast, south of Kharkiv.

== History ==
It was a village in Kharkov Governorate of the Russian Empire.

A local newspaper is published here since August 1929.

During World War II it was under German occupation from October 1941 to September 1943.

Urban-type settlement since 1957.

In January 1989 the population was 5840 people. In January 2013 the population was 3909 people.

Until 18 July 2020, Blyzniuky was the administrative center of Blyzniuky Raion. The raion was abolished in July 2020 as part of the administrative reform of Ukraine, which reduced the number of raions of Kharkiv Oblast to seven. The area of Blyzniuky Raion was merged into Lozova Raion.

Until 26 January 2024, Blyzniuky was designated urban-type settlement. On this day, a new law entered into force which abolished this status, and Blyzniuky became a rural settlement.

== Economy ==
=== Transportation ===
Blyzniuky railway station is on the Donets Railway which connects Lozova (to the west) with Oleksandrivka and Sloviansk (to the east).

Blyzniuky is on a paved road connecting Lozova with Izium via Barvinkove. There are also local roads.
