= Orilka =

Rural locality in Kharkiv Oblast, Ukraine

Orilka Орілька
- Rural settlement
- Location within Ukraine Location within Kharkiv Oblast
- Coordinates: 48°58′25″N 36°01′04″E
- Country: Ukraine
- Oblast: Kharkiv Oblast
- Raion: Lozova Raion

Population (2022)
  - Total: 2,828
- Time zone: UTC+2 (EET)
  - Summer (DST): UTC+3 (EEST)

Orilka (Ukrainian: Орілька, Russian: Орелька) is a rural settlement in Lozova Raion of Kharkiv Oblast in Ukraine. It is located at the border with Dnipropetrovsk Oblast, on the left bank of the Orilka, a tributary of the Oril in the drainage basin of the Dnieper. The river is dammed nearby forming Orilka Reservoir. Orilka belongs to Lozova urban hromada, one of the hromadas of Ukraine. Population: 2,828 (2022 estimate).

Until 26 January 2024, Orilka was designated urban-type settlement. On this day, a new law entered into force which abolished this status, and Orilka became a rural settlement.

== Economy ==
=== Transportation ===
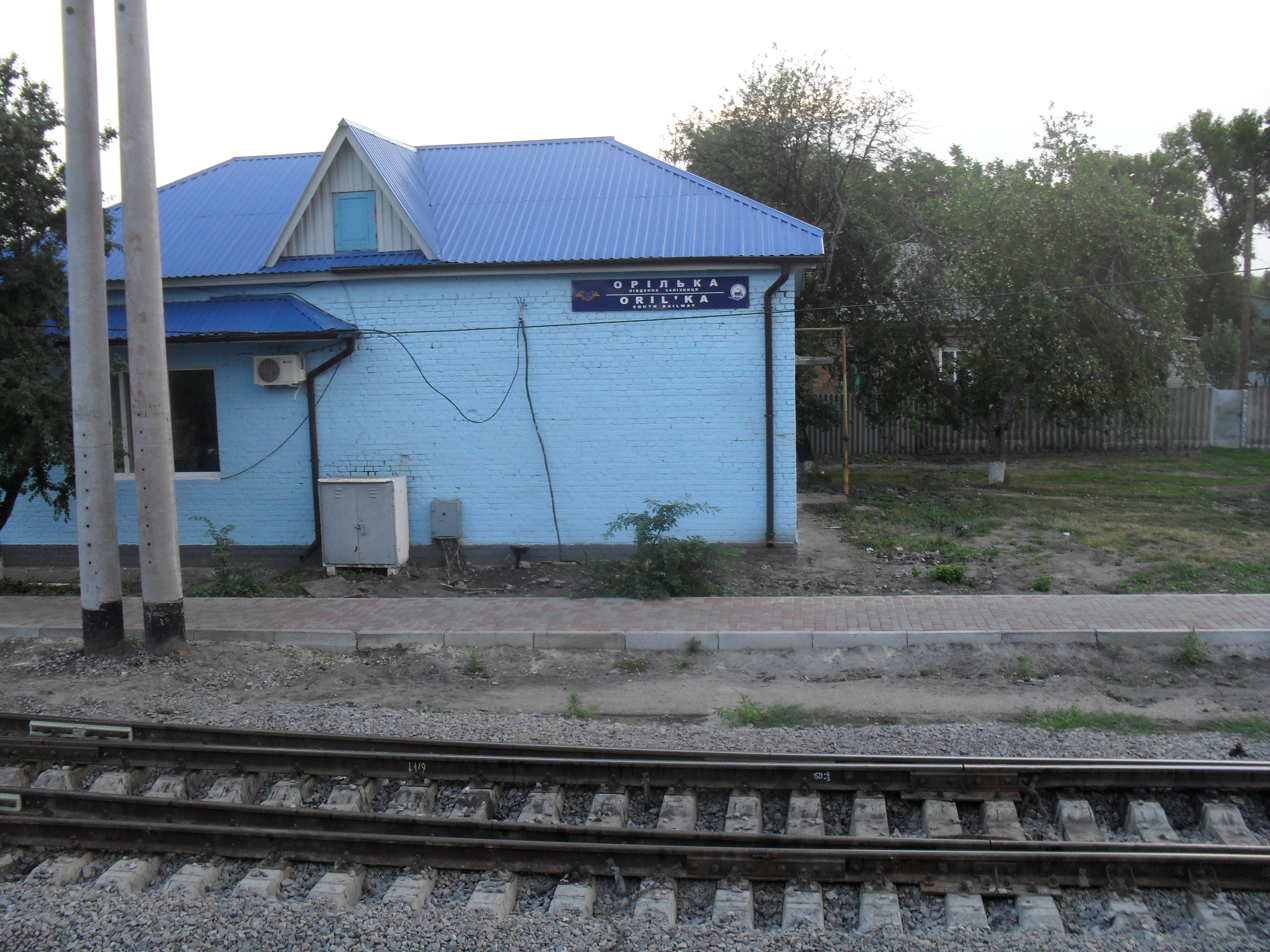
Orilka railway station

Orilka railway station is on the railway connecting Lozova with Poltava via Krasnohrad. There is some passenger traffic.

The settlement has access to Highway M18 which connects Kharkiv with Dnipro.
