= Trojan =

Trojan or Trojans may refer to:

- Of or from the ancient city of Troy
- Trojan language, the language of the historical Trojans

== Arts and entertainment ==
=== Music ===
- Les Troyens ('The Trojans'), an opera by Berlioz, premiered part 1863, part 1890
- The Trojan, a 1950s Jamaican sound system led by Duke Reid
- Trojan Records, a British record label, founded in 1968
- "Trojans" (The Damned song), a song by The Damned on their 1985 album Phantasmagoria
- Trojans (EP), by Atlas Genius, 2013

=== Other uses in arts and entertainment ===
- Trojan (video game), 1986
- Trojan, a 1991 novel by James Follett
- Troy, a 2004 historical war drama
- "Trojan" (Red Dwarf), a 2012 episode of the TV comedy

== People ==
- Trojan (surname), including a list of people with the name
- Trojan Gundulić (c. 1500 – c. 1555), a merchant and printer from the Republic of Ragusa

== Places ==
- Trojan, South Dakota U.S.
- Trojan (mountain), on the border of Albania and Montenegro
- Trojan Peak, a mountain in California
- Trojan Nuclear Power Plant, in Oregon, U.S.

== Transportation and military ==
- GWR No. 1340 Trojan, a British locomotive, built in 1897
- Trojan (automobile), a former British vehicle manufacturer (1914–1965)
- Trojan, a Saltwood Miniature Railway locomotive, used from 1928 to 1970
- AL-60F-5 Trojan, a variant of the Aermacchi AL-60 aircraft (1950s–60s)
- Trojan Armoured Vehicle Royal Engineers, a British combat engineering vehicle (in service since 2007)
- North American T-28 Trojan, an American military trainer aircraft (1950s)

== Other uses ==
- Trojan (brand), American condoms
- Trojan (celestial body), that shares the orbit of a larger one
- Trojans F.C., a football club in Northern Ireland
- Trojans F.C. (1869), a defunct English football club
- Trojan horse (computing), or trojan, computer malware
- Trojans, a group of scholars in the Grammarians' War in England 1519–1521
- Trojan–Tauranac Racing, a Formula One constructor
- USC Trojans, nickname for the athletic teams at the University of Southern California

== See also ==
- The Trojan Women (Τρῳάδες, Trōiades, 415 BC), a play by Euripides
- The Trojan Women (film), 1971
- Tommy Trojan, a statue at the University of Southern California
- Trojan Horse (disambiguation)
- Trojan skinhead, a British cultural identity
- Troyan (disambiguation)
- Troian (disambiguation)
- Trajan (disambiguation)
