= Troiano =

Troiano, Troyano or Troyanos may refer to:

== People ==
=== Troiano ===
- Troiano Gondola (Trojan Gundulić) (c. 1500 – c. 1555), a merchant and printer from the Republic of Ragusa
- Troiano Acquaviva d’Aragona (1696–1747), Italian cardinal and Catholic archbishop
- Anthony Troiano (born 1988), Australian musician
- Domenic Troiano (1946–2005), Canadian rock guitarist
- Massimo Troiano (died c. 1570), Italian Renaissance composer, poet, and chronicler
- Michele Troiano (born 1985), Italian football player
- Sophie Troiano (born 1987), British fencer

=== Troyano ===
- Alina Troyano, stage name Carmelita Tropicana, Cuban-American actress
- Juan Santisteban Troyano (born 1936), Spanish footballer

=== Troyanos ===
- Tatiana Troyanos (1938–1993), American mezzo-soprano

== Places ==
- Troiano (Bisenti), a place in Abruzzo, Italy

== See also ==
- Troian (disambiguation)
- Troyan (disambiguation)
- De bello Troiano, an epic poem in Latin
