= Trojan (surname) =

The surname Trojan may refer to:

- Aleksandra Trojan (born 1991), Polish volleyball player
- Alexander Trojan (1914–1992), Austrian film actor
- Alois Pravoslav Trojan (1815–1893), Czech lawyer
- Filip Trojan (born 1983), Czech former professional footballer
- Ivan Trojan (born 1964), Czech actor
- Kurt von Trojan (1937–2006), Australian journalist and science fiction writer
- Ondřej Trojan (born 1959), Czech film producer, actor and film director
- Piotr Trojan (born 1986), Polish actor and playwright
- Václav Trojan (1907–1983), Czech composer of classical music

== See also ==
- Troyan (surname)
