= Pervomaiskyi Raion, Kharkiv Oblast =

Former subdivision of Kharkiv Oblast, Ukraine

Pervomaiskyi Raion Первомайський район
- Raion
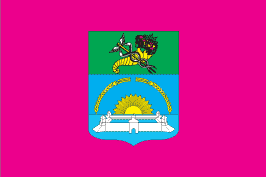
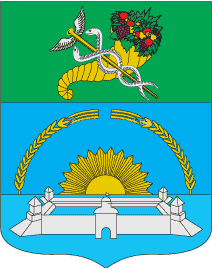
- Flag Coat of arms

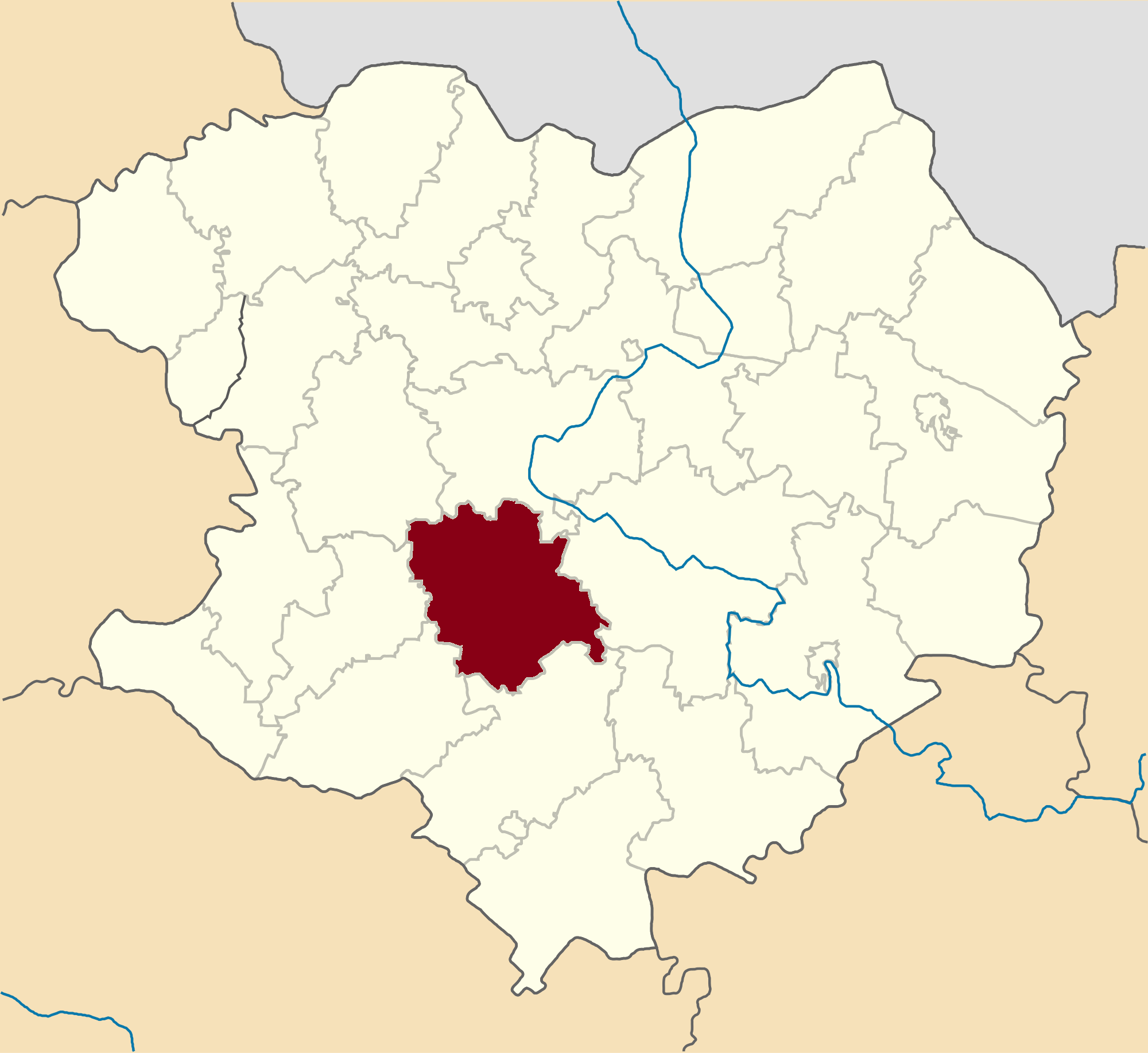
- Raion location in Kharkiv Oblast
- Coordinates: 49°21′15.8328″N 36°16′13.8468″E
- Country: Ukraine
- Oblast: Kharkiv Oblast
- Disestablished: 18 July 2020
- Admin. center: Pervomaiskyi

Area
  - Total: 1,225.3 km^{2} (473.1 sq mi)

Population (2020)
  - Total: 14,747
  - Density: 12.035/km^{2} (31.172/sq mi)
- Time zone: UTC+2 (EET)
  - Summer (DST): UTC+3 (EEST)
- Website: http://pervomairda.org.ua/

Pervomaiskyi Raion (Ukrainian: Первомайський район) was a raion (district) in Kharkiv Oblast of Ukraine. Its administrative center was the city of Pervomaiskyi which was incorporated as a city of oblast significance and did not belong to the raion. The raion was abolished on 18 July 2020 as part of the administrative reform of Ukraine, which reduced the number of raions of Kharkiv Oblast to seven. The area of Pervomaiskyi Raion was merged into Lozova Raion. The last estimate of the raion population was 14,747 (2020 est.)

At the time of disestablishment, the raion consisted of two hromadas:

- Biliaivka rural hromada with the administration in the settlement of Biliaivka;
- Oleksiivka rural hromada with the administration in the selo of Oleksiivka.
