= Trajan (disambiguation) =

Trajan may refer to:

== People ==
- Traianus, or Trajan, the 13th Roman emperor.
  - Marcus Ulpius Traianus, a senator and father to Emperor Trajan
  - Traianus Hadrianus, or Hadrian, the 14th Roman emperor and successor to Trajan
  - Trajan's Column, a monument raised in his honor.
- Trajan Decius, the 34th Roman emperor
- Traianus (magister peditum), Roman general in the Gothic War (376–382)
- Trajan the Patrician, Byzantine historian
- Trajan Jeffcoat (born 1999), American football player
- Trajan Langdon, American professional basketball player

== Other uses ==
- Trajan (typeface), a serif typeface created by American designer Carol Twombly in 1989
- Trajan (board game)

== See also ==
- Trayan (disambiguation)
- Traian (disambiguation)
- Trojan (disambiguation)
