= Traian (disambiguation) =

Traian may refer to:

== People ==
- Traianus, or Trajan, the 13th Roman emperor.
  - Marcus Ulpius Traianus, a senator and father to Emperor Trajan
  - Traianus Hadrianus, or Hadrian, the 14th Roman emperor and successor to Trajan
  - Trajan's Column, a monument raised in his honor.
    - Trajan (typeface), a font made by Carol Twombly based on the inscriptions on the column.
- Traianus (magister peditum), Roman general in the Gothic War (376–382)
- Traian Băsescu, President of Romania from 2004 to 2014
- Traian Bratu, Romanian Germanist
- Traian Brăileanu, Romanian sociologist and politician
- Traian Cihărean, Romanian weightlifter
- Traian Cocorăscu, Romanian general
- Traian T. Coșovei, Romanian poet
- Traian Crișan, Romanian Greek-Catholic bishop
- Traian Demetrescu, Romanian poet
- Traian Herseni, Romanian social scientist
- Traian Ichim, Romanian chess player
- Traian Ionescu, Romanian footballer
- Traian Iordache, Romanian footballer
- Traian Ivănescu, Romanian footballer
- Traian Lalescu, Romanian mathematician
- Traian Moșoiu, Romanian general
- Traian Neagu, Romanian canoeist
- Traian Nițescu, Romanian engineer and bobsledder
- Traian Popovici, Romanian lawyer
- Traian Stoianovich, Serbian-Canadian historian
- Traian Săvulescu, Romanian biologist
- Traian Trestioreanu, Romanian painter
- Traian Ungureanu, Romanian journalist and politician
- Traian Vuia, Romanian aviator

== Places in Romania ==
- Traian, Bacău, a commune in Bacău County
- Traian, Brăila, a commune in Brăila County
- Traian, Ialomița, a commune in Ialomița County
- Traian, Olt, a commune in Olt County
- Traian, Teleorman, a commune in Teleorman County
- Traian, a village in Săcele Commune, Constanța County
- Traian, a village in Braniștea Commune, Galați County
- Traian, a village in Bivolari Commune, Iași County
- Traian, a village in Săbăoani Commune, Neamț County
- Traian, a village in Zănești Commune, Neamț County
- Traian, a village in Doba Commune, Satu Mare County
- Traian, a village in Cerna Commune, Tulcea County
- Traian, a district in the town of Vânju Mare, Mehedinți County

== See also ==
- Trajan (disambiguation)
- Trayan (disambiguation)
- Troian (disambiguation)
