= Blyzniuky Raion =

Former subdivision of Kharkiv Oblast, Ukraine

Blyzniuky Raion Близнюківський район
- Raion
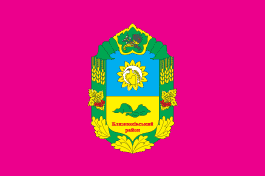
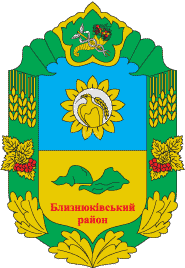
- Flag Coat of arms

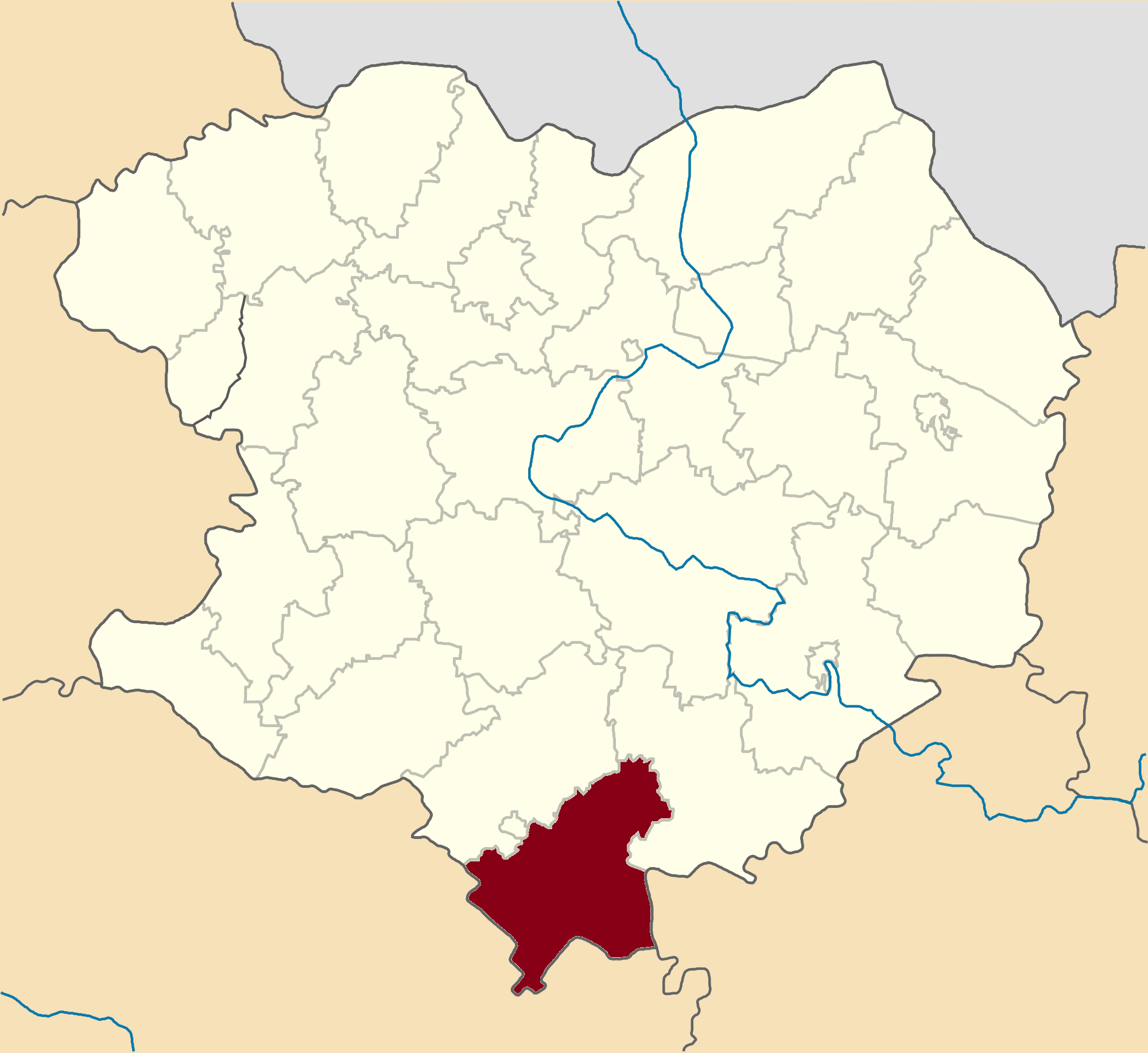
- Raion location in Kharkiv Oblast
- Coordinates: 48°46′40.6266″N 36°29′37.8666″E
- Country: Ukraine
- Oblast: Kharkiv Oblast
- Disestablished: 18 July 2020
- Admin. center: Blyzniuky

Area
  - Total: 1,380 km^{2} (530 sq mi)

Population (2020)
  - Total: 17,799
  - Density: 12.9/km^{2} (33.4/sq mi)
- Time zone: UTC+2 (EET)
  - Summer (DST): UTC+3 (EEST)

Blyzniuky Raion (Ukrainian: Близнюківський район) was a raion (district) in Kharkiv Oblast of Ukraine. Its administrative center was the urban-type settlement of Blyzniuky. The raion was abolished on 18 July 2020 as part of the administrative reform of Ukraine, which reduced the number of raions of Kharkiv Oblast to seven. The area of Blyzniuky Raion was merged into Lozova Raion. The last estimate of the raion population was 17,799 (2020 est.)

At the time of disestablishment, the raion consisted of one hromada, Blyzniuky settlement hromada with the administration in Blyzniuky.
