= Sergei Troyan =

Russian footballer

Personal information
- Full name: Sergei Igorevich Troyan
- Date of birth: 4 October 1984 (age 42)
- Place of birth: Astrakhan, Russian SFSR
- Height: 1.75 m (5 ft 9 in)
- Position: Midfielder

Youth career
- FC Volgar Astrakhan

Senior career*
Years	Team	Apps	(Gls)
2003–2004	FC Volgar-Gazprom Astrakhan	32	(1)
2005	FC Sudostroitel Astrakhan	21	(6)
2006–2008	FC Rotor Volgograd	63	(3)
2008	FC Volgar-Gazprom-2 Astrakhan	17	(2)
2009	FC Rotor Volgograd	18	(1)
2009	FC Fakel-Voronezh	2	(0)
2010	FC SOYUZ-Gazprom Izhevsk	26	(0)
2011–2013	FC Sokol Saratov	62	(6)
2013–2014	FC Zenit-Izhevsk	22	(1)
2014	FC Saturn Ramenskoye	11	(0)
2015	FC Oryol	1	(0)
- * Club domestic league appearances and goals

Sergei Igorevich Troyan (Russian: Серге́й Игоревич Троян; born 4 October 1984) is a former Russian professional football player.

== Club career ==
He played in the Russian Football National League for FC Volgar-Gazprom Astrakhan in 2003.
