= Trayan =

Trayan is a given name or surname. The name may refer to:

== Given name ==
- Trayan of Bulgaria (990–1038)
- Trayan Dyankov
- Trayan Trayanov
- Trayan Dimitrov

== Surname ==
- Aurore Trayan, an athlete from France

== See also ==
- Trajan (disambiguation)
- Traian (disambiguation)
- Troyan (disambiguation)
