= Troiano, Bisenti =

Coordinates: 42°32′17″N 13°49′09″E

Troiano (Bisenti)
- Frazione
- Interactive map of Troiano (Bisenti)
- Country: Italy
- Region: Abruzzo
- Province: Teramo
- Time zone: UTC+1 (CET)
  - Summer (DST): UTC+2 (CEST)

Troiano (Bisenti) is a frazione in the Province of Teramo in the Abruzzo region of Italy.
