= Troian =

Troian may refer to:

- Sandra Troian (born 1957), American applied physicist
- Troian Bellisario (born 1985), an American actress
- Troian, a village in Vozneseni commune, Leova District, Moldova
- Troian, a village in Râmnicu Vâlcea, Vâlcea County, Romania
- Troian, an obsolete form of Trojan, of or from Troy
- Trojan 1337, hacker group based in India.

== See also ==
- Troiano (disambiguation)
- Trojan (disambiguation)
- Troyan (disambiguation)
- Traian (disambiguation)
