= Lozova Raion =

Subdivision of Kharkiv Oblast, Ukraine

Lozova Raion Лозівський район
- Raion
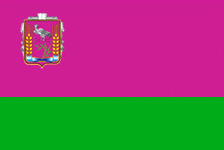
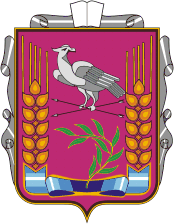
- Flag Coat of arms

- Raion location in Kharkiv Oblast
- Coordinates: 49°1′43.7232″N 36°20′8.5632″E
- Country: Ukraine
- Oblast: Kharkiv Oblast
- Admin. center: Lozova
- Subdivisions: 5 hromadas

Area
  - Total: 4,027.1 km^{2} (1,554.9 sq mi)

Population (2022)
  - Total: 147,361
  - Density: 36.592/km^{2} (94.774/sq mi)
- Time zone: UTC+2 (EET)
  - Summer (DST): UTC+3 (EEST)
- Website: lozrada.kharkov.ua

Lozova Raion (Ukrainian: Лозівський район) is a raion in Kharkiv Oblast in eastern Ukraine. Its administrative center is the city of Lozova. Current population: 147,361 (2022 estimate).

On 18 July 2020, as part of the administrative reform of Ukraine, the number of raions of Kharkiv Oblast was reduced to seven, and the area of Lozova Raion was significantly expanded. Two abolished raions, Blyzniuky and Pervomaiskyi Raions, as well as Lozova Municipality and the city of Pervomaiskyi, which was previously incorporated as a city of oblast significance, were merged into Lozova Raion. The January 2020 estimate of the raion population was 27,331 (2020 est.).

== Subdivisions ==
=== Current ===
After the reform in July 2020, the raion consisted of 5 hromadas:

- Biliaivka rural hromada with the administration in the settlement of Biliaivka, transferred from Pervomaiskyi Raion;
- Blyzniuky settlement hromada with the administration in the rural settlement of Blyzniuky, transferred from Blyzniuky Raion;
- Lozova urban hromada with the administration in the city of Lozova, retained from Lozova Raion and transferred from Lozova Municipality;
- Oleksiivka rural hromada with the administration in the village of Oleksiivka, transferred from Pervomaiskyi Raion;
- Pervomaiskyi urban hromada, with the administration in the city of Zlatopil, transferred from the city of oblast significance of Pervomaiskyi.

=== Before 2020 ===
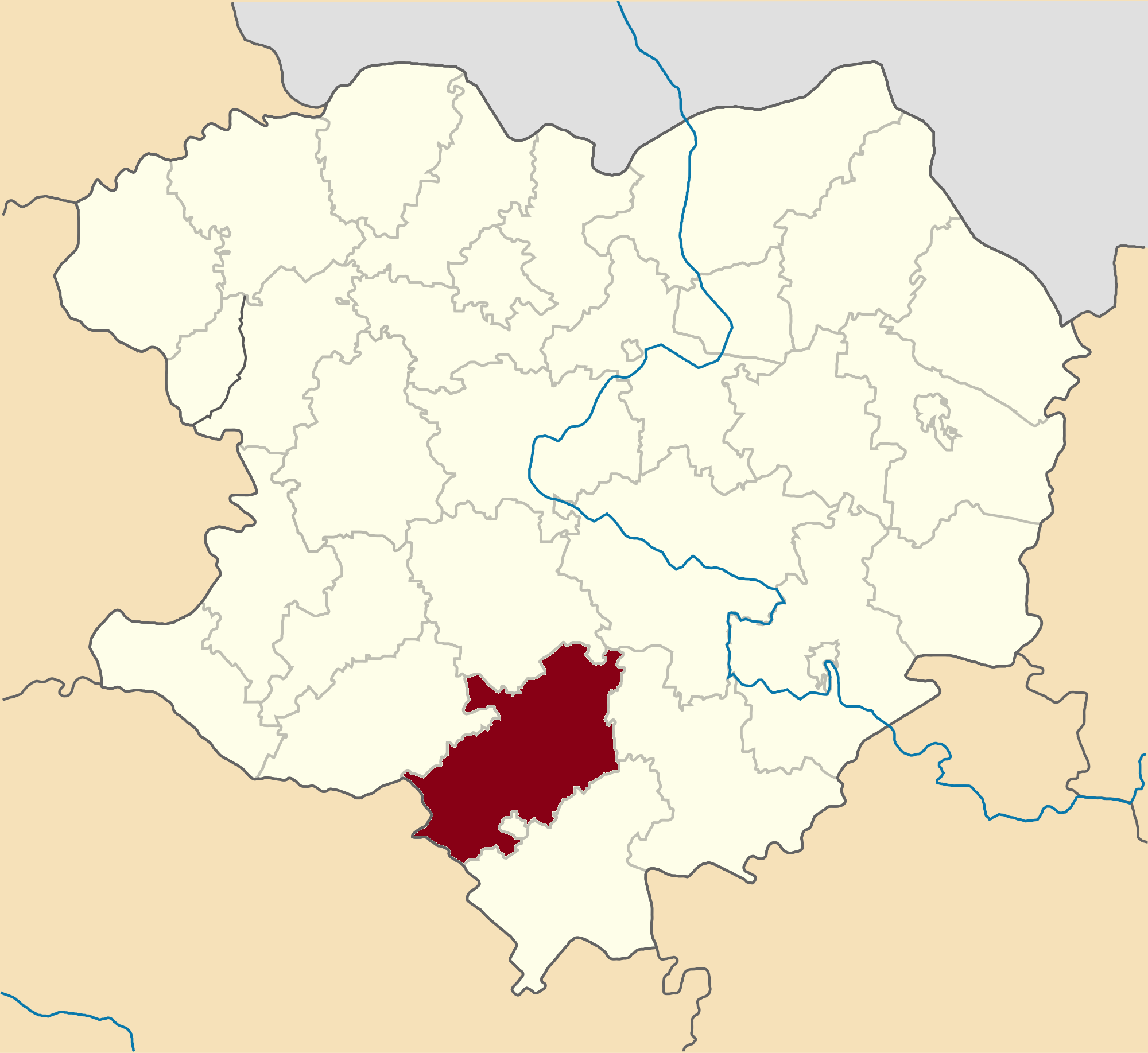
Lozova Raion in Kharkiv Oblast before 2020

At the time of disestablishment, the raion consisted of one hromada, Lozova urban hromada with the administration in Lozova. The hromada also included Lozova Municipality.

== Geography ==
The territory of the Lozova raion is located on the Poltava Plain and Dnieper Lowland, within the forest steppe and steppe natural zone. The relief of the district is an undulating plain with ravines and gullies.

The climate of the raion is temperate continental with cold winters and hot summers. The average annual temperature is +7.3 °C (in January -5.1, in July +19,7). The average annual rainfall is 575 mm. The soils of the community are chernozems and meadow soils. The highest rainfall occurs in the summer. In the district, steppe areas have been plowed for agriculture. Forest vegetation is found in river floodplains.

The watershed between the Dnieper and Don basins runs through the Lozova Raion. The Dnipro-Donbas water canal runs through the district. There is the Krasnopavlivske reservoir.

Mineral resources of the Lozova Raion: loams, clays, natural gas. The Lozova district has developed mining, processing, and agriculture industries.

Regional highways P51 and P79 pass through the Lozova district. An important transport hub in the area is Lozova station.
