= Lozova =

City in Kharkiv Oblast, Ukraine

Lozova Лозова Лозовая
- City
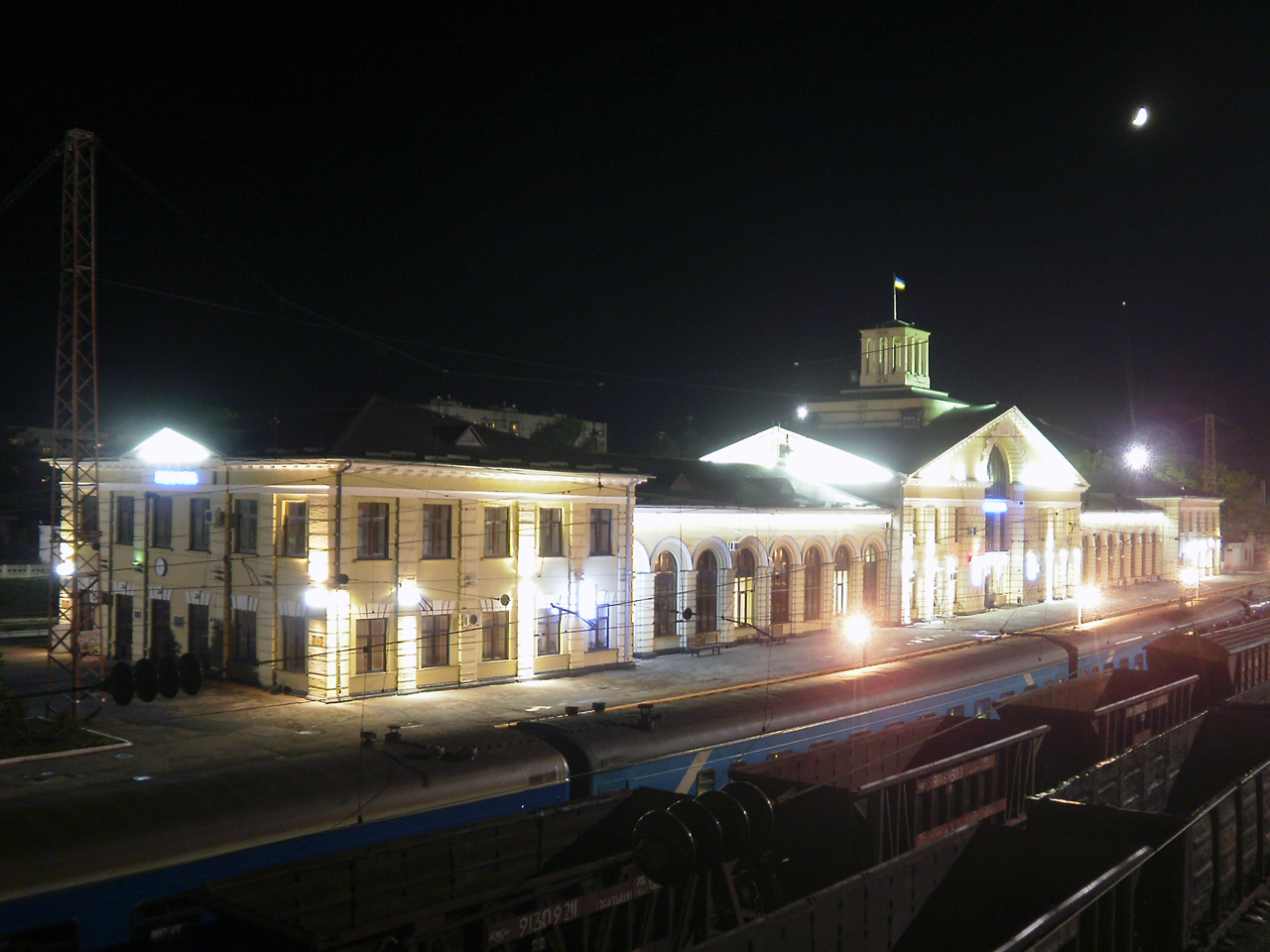
- Lozova railway station

- Flag Coat of arms
- Interactive map of Lozova
- Location within Kharkiv Oblast Location within Ukraine
- Coordinates: 48°53′N 36°23′E
- Country: Ukraine
- Oblast: Kharkiv Oblast
- Raion: Lozova Raion
- Hromada: Lozova urban hromada
- Founded: 1869

Government
  - Mayor: Serhiy Zelensky

Area
  - Total: 26.55 km^{2} (10.25 sq mi)

Population (2022)
  - Total: 53,126
  - Density: 2,001/km^{2} (5,183/sq mi)
- Time zone: UTC+2 (EET)
  - Summer (DST): UTC+3 (EEST)
- Postal code: 61135—61166
- Area code: +38 05745
- Website: lozovarada.gov.ua

Lozova (Ukrainian: Лозова, IPA: [lozoˈwɑ], Russian: Лозовая, romanized: Lozovaya) is a city in Kharkiv Oblast, eastern Ukraine. It serves as the administrative center of Lozova Raion. Lozova hosts the administration of Lozova urban hromada, one of the hromadas of Ukraine. The city population was 53,126 (2022 estimate). Lozova is the 2nd largest city in Kharkiv Oblast after Kharkiv in terms of population.

== Etymology ==
The name "Lozovaya" comes from the word "vine." According to one version of the origin of the city's name, the Lozovaya River (a hydronymic version of the astionim) flowed through Lozovaya. According to another, the banks of this river were filled with vines, which gave the river, and then the city, its name.

The Soviet writer Vasily Yan writes about the name "Lozovaya."

Zalozny Shlyakh is a very ancient trade route from the Sea of Azov to the Dnieper. "Zalozny" derives from the ancient origin of the word "iron," as iron, a valuable metal in ancient times and imported from China and other parts of Asia, was transported along this shortest route by caravans. (Zabelin, Brun.) This name “Zalozny” was preserved in the changed name of the station “Lozovaya”

== History ==
=== Foundation ===
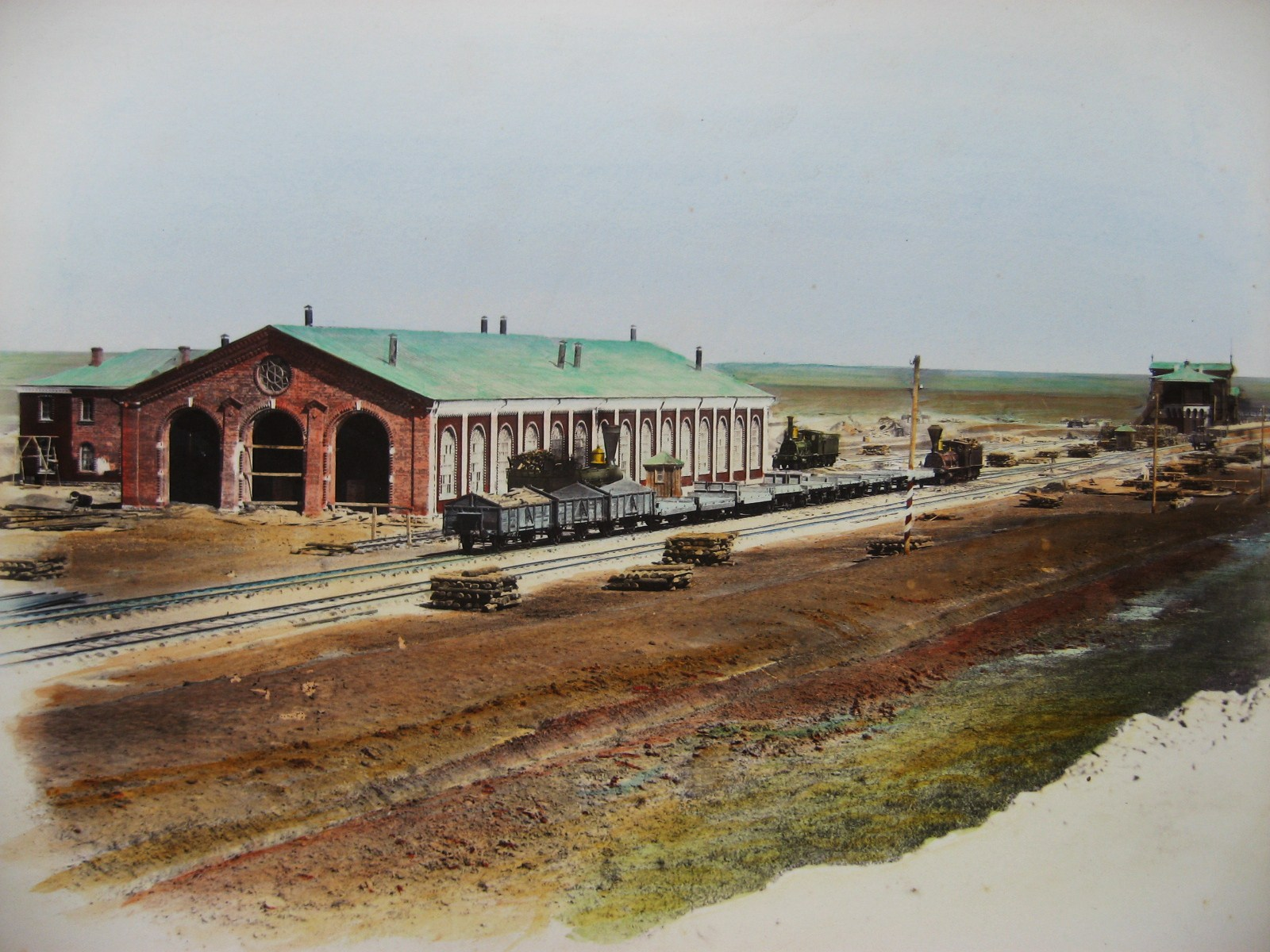
Lozova Railway Station, 1885-1888.

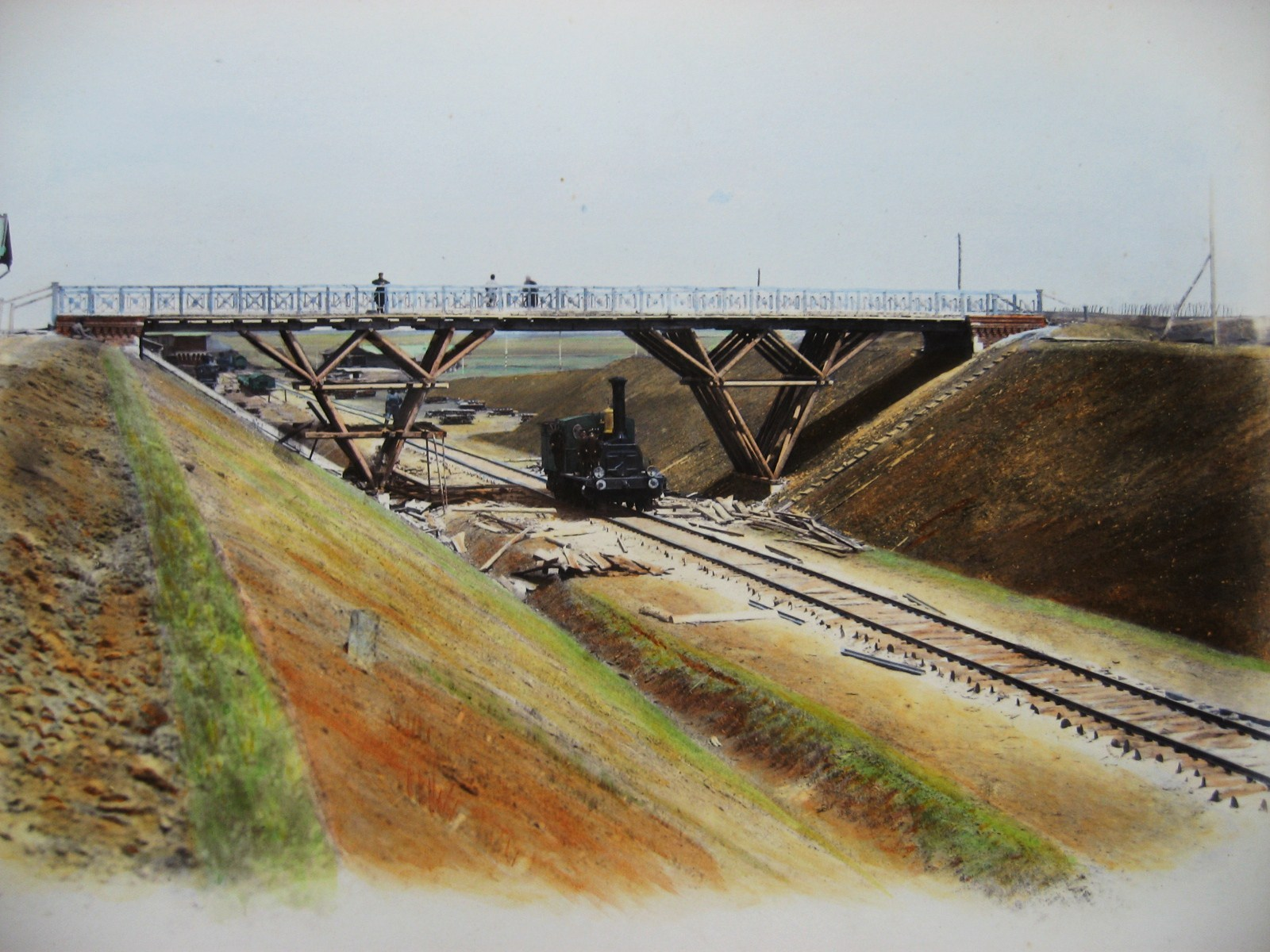
Overpass near Lozova Station, 1885-1888.

Lozova was founded in 1869 as a station settlement in Kharkov Governorate of the Russian Empire in connection with the construction of the Kursk-Kharkiv-Azov Railway. On 23 December 1869, the first train of the Kursk-Kharkov-Azov Railway passed through Lozovaya. Its construction initiated the development of the region, as grain-producing regions were connected to the seaports of the Russian Empire, which exported grain.

In the second half of the 19th century, the Dnieper Railway, opened in 1875, also saw the construction of the Lozova-Sevastopol Railway, which gave further impetus to the development of the entire southern region of the Russian Empire. In 1902, a railway line from Kostiantynohrad (now Krasnohrad) reached Lozova.

Before World War I, Lozova had two parts: Zarudnevskaya and Avilovskaya. Zarudnevskaya, a well-appointed part, was home to merchants, traders, and commoners. The houses were made of stone, and there was a cinema, a merchant club, and a city garden. The Avilovskaya part, near the station, was home to railroad workers: switchmen, conductors, and engine drivers; artisans and other hired laborers. Living conditions here were worse: the houses were poor, wooden, often wattle and daub huts; there were no sidewalkss.

=== Ukrainian War of Independence (1917-1919) ===
During the Ukrainian War of Independence, in December 1917, a 30,000-strong corps of military units led by Vladimir Antonov-Ovseenko launched an offensive deep into Sloboda Ukraine. After capturing Kharkiv, a combined detachment of Red Guards and soldiers of the 30th Infantry Regiment under the command of Nikolay Rudnev began advancing toward Pavlohrad. On 14 December (27), the Red Army soldiers approached Lozova station, after which, on the third day of fighting, having pushed back small detachments of the Lozovsky Haidamaka Kuren and the Pavlohrad Free Cossacks the active Ukrainian army that had arrived to reinforce it, they occupied the settlement.

Soviet power lasted less than four months: on 8 April 1918, Lozova was recaptured by the 3rd Haidamaka Regiment of the Zaporizhian Division of the UPR Army under the command of General Alexander Natiev with the support of troops from Austria-Hungary and Germany (the latter were stationed here until November of the same year to ensure order and guarantee the fulfillment of the UPR's allied obligations.

Later power changed several times: in November 1918, Lozova came under the control of the Ukrainian Directorate, on 17 January 1919, it was occupied by units of the Red Army, and in July 1919, by troops of the VSYUR. On 15 December 1919, Red Army units again occupied Lozova and Soviet power was restored, after which repressions began (in particular, all churches were destroyed). Afterwards it was administratively part of the Katerynoslav Governorate of Ukraine.

=== Interwar period (1920–1939) ===
From its founding until 1926, Lozova was part of the Pavlohrad District of the Yekaterinoslav Governorate. In July 1926, it was transferred to the Kharkiv Governorate. Since 1929, it has been in the Kharkiv Oblast. A local newspaper has been published in Lozova since August 1929. In August 1929, publication of a local newspaper began.

In 1932–33, during the Holodomor, the population of Lozova suffered less than residents of surrounding villages, as the settlement was considered industrial, and workers received rations. On 19 October 1938, Lozova was granted city status. In 1939, the city's population was 21,975 people.

=== Second World War (1939–1945) ===
During the Second World War, the city changed hands several times. The first Wehrmacht units entered the city on 11 October 1941, and the city was occupied by German troops.

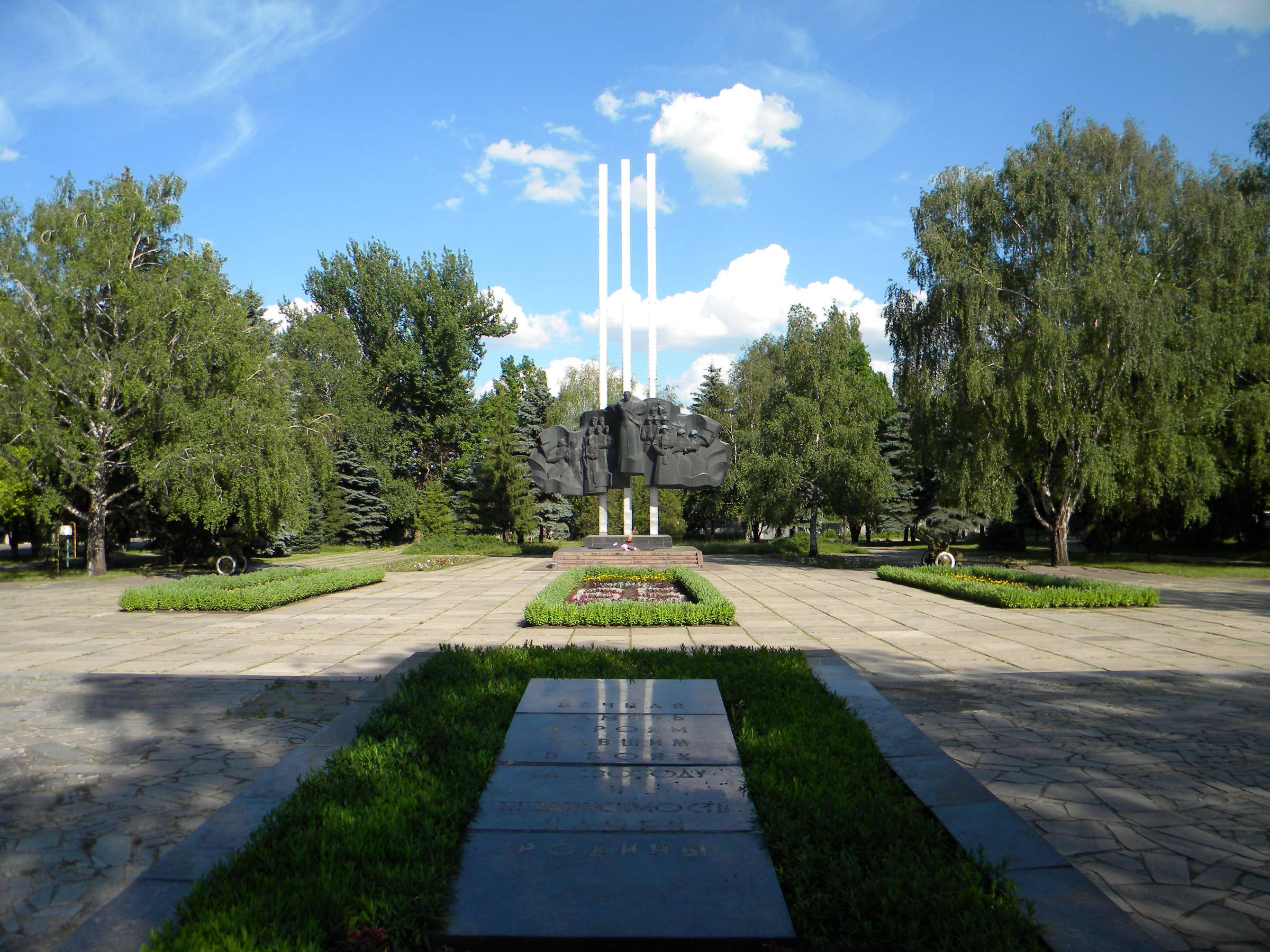
Mass grave of 456 soldiers killed in World War II

Fierce fighting in the Lozova area took place in January 1942 during the Red Army's Barvenkovo–Lozovaya offensive (the 2nd Battle of Kharkiv). On 27 January 1942, the city was liberated from German forces by troops of the Southwestern Front: the 6th Army, consisting of the 270th Rifle Division.

On 22–23 May 1942, after the failure of the Soviet offensive on Kharkiv, the city was reoccupied. On 11 February 1943, it was liberated by troops of the Southwestern Front during the Voroshilovgrad Operation: the 1st Guards Army consisting of the 35th Guards Rifle Division and the 4th Guards Rifle Corps.

On 21 February 1943, it was occupied for the third time (see Third Battle of Kharkov). During the occupation, the city housed two concentration camps for Soviet prisoners of war, where the mortality rate in winter reached up to 100 people per day. Thousands of prisoners and Jews were shot in Zayachyaya Balka. Partisan detachments were active in the city, regularly distributing anti-fascist propaganda leaflets and carrying out bombings and sabotage at Lozova station. Partisan activity intensified particularly in 1943, during the Battle of Kursk.

On 16 September 1943, the city was liberated from German troops by Soviet troops of the Southwestern Front during the Donbas strategic offensive:

- 6th Army consisting of: 26th Guards Rifle Corps consisting of: 38th Guards Rifle Division, 35th Guards Rifle Division, 25th Guards Rifle Division; 47th Guards Rifle Division 4th Guards Rifle Corps.
- 17th Air Army consisting of: part of the troops of the 305th Guards Assault Aviation Division, 9th Mixed Aviation Corps; 262nd Night Bomber Aviation Division, 244th Bomber Aviation Division. These divisions were given the name "Lozovskie" by order of the Supreme Commander-in-Chief dated 23 September 1943.

=== Post-war period ===
After its liberation, the city was completely restored. In the 1950s, a new railway station was built. The restoration of the (almost completely destroyed) railway junction and the construction of the new station were carried out under the supervision of General-Chief of the 3rd rank Hero of Socialist Labor Mikhail Bondarenko by the restoration work department of the Southern Railway and the Yuzhtransstroy trust. In 1953, there were several railway maintenance companies, four secondary schools, two libraries, a House of Culture and one stadium.

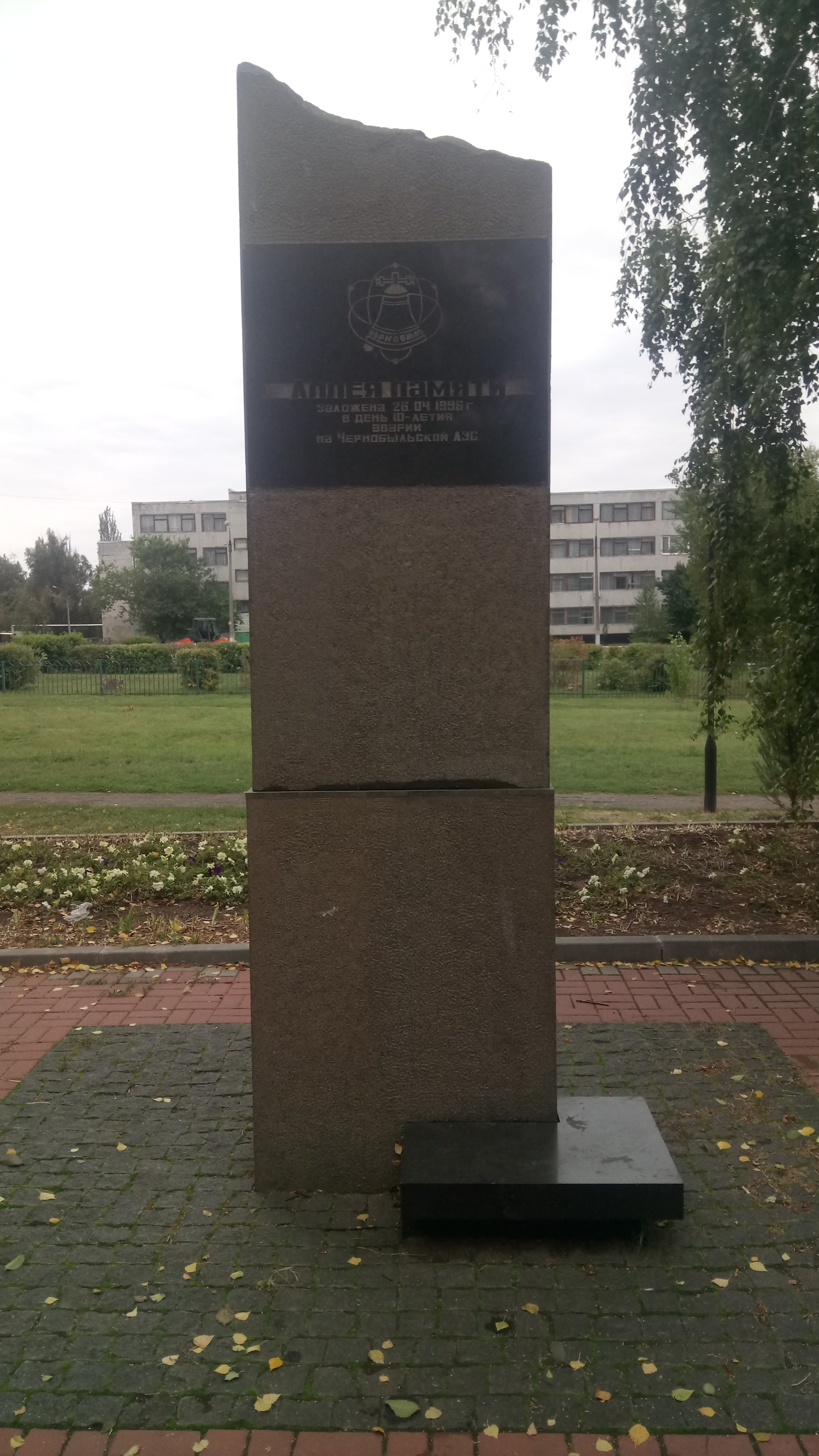
Chornobyl disaster memorial

In January 1959, the city's population was 27,100. In January 1970 - 35,600 people. In 1972, the population was 38,800 people. In 1975, the city's population was 49,200. In January 1989 the population was 72,991 people, the basis of the city's economy at that time were mechanical engineering, metalworking, railway transport enterprises and the food industry.

The city was evacuated on 27 August 2008 due to a fire in an arsenal. However, there were no serious casualties or deaths and caused significant material damage. On 28 August 2008, a gas distribution station near a military unit exploded due to a fire., the population within a 3 km radius was temporarily evacuated.

As of the beginning of 2009, the population was 59,400, with the economy based on the forge and mechanical plant, the Traktorodetal combine plant, a metalworking plant, and railway maintenance enterprises. In January 2013, the population was 58,307 people.

Until 18 July 2020, Lozova was incorporated as a city of oblast significance and the center of the Lozova Municipality. The municipality was abolished in July 2020 as part of the administrative reform of Ukraine, which reduced the number of raions of Kharkiv Oblast to seven. The area of Lozova Municipality was merged into Lozova Raion.

=== Russian invasion of Ukraine ===
Russia started an invasion of Ukraine on 24 February 2022. Lozova has come under attack several times since the beginning of Russian invasion of Ukraine as it is one of the main railway hubs and a city of strategic significance.

- On 24 February 2022 at 5:52 am, a radar station located in the south of the city near Avilovka raion was hit by three Russian missiles which saw the devastation of the radar station and a gas transit station nearby.

Russian rocket strike on Lozova House of Culture on 20 May 2022

- On 20 May 2022, a Russian missile system fired three rockets, according to Ukrainian sources; two of them were anticipated by the Ukrainian anti-rocket system but the third one hit the city's Cultural Centre. According to the ministry of emergency affairs of Ukraine, 11 people were injured but no one died (however, an 11-year-old girl was among those severely injured). Russian authorities made no comment but on some unofficial Twitter handles of pro-Russian forces, it was claimed that the Ukrainian Territorial Defence Brigade was hiding in the Cultural House building.
- On 5 August 2025 the Sevostopil side of the station was badly damaged by a Russian Drone attack, and as a result a station railway mechanic died while ten passengers were badly injured. Among them there were two children under 10.

As of 1 January 2025, the population was 60,000.

== Geography ==
The city is located at the source of the Lozova River (a tributary of the Britai River), which flows into the Britai River after 12 km. The villages of Domakha (Kharkiv Oblast), Ukrainske (Lozova City Council), and Lesovskoye are adjacent to the city.

=== Climate ===
Lozova's climate is moderately continental. It is drier than Kharkiv's climate and is classified as a steppe climate. The average July temperature is +22 to +25 degrees Celsius, and January temperatures are -5 to -8 degrees Celsius. Precipitation is approximately 500–550 mm per year. Winds are easterly and westerly.

Climate data for Lozova (1991–2020)
Month	Jan	Feb	Mar	Apr	May	Jun	Jul	Aug	Sep	Oct	Nov	Dec	Year
Mean daily maximum °C (°F)	−1.9 (28.6)	−0.6 (30.9)	5.9 (42.6)	15.4 (59.7)	22.0 (71.6)	25.8 (78.4)	28.2 (82.8)	27.7 (81.9)	21.3 (70.3)	13.2 (55.8)	4.9 (40.8)	−0.3 (31.5)	13.5 (56.3)
Daily mean °C (°F)	−4.4 (24.1)	−3.7 (25.3)	1.7 (35.1)	9.8 (49.6)	16.2 (61.2)	20.1 (68.2)	22.1 (71.8)	21.3 (70.3)	15.4 (59.7)	8.5 (47.3)	1.8 (35.2)	−2.8 (27.0)	8.8 (47.8)
Mean daily minimum °C (°F)	−6.8 (19.8)	−6.5 (20.3)	−1.6 (29.1)	4.9 (40.8)	10.7 (51.3)	14.8 (58.6)	16.5 (61.7)	15.4 (59.7)	10.3 (50.5)	4.7 (40.5)	−0.8 (30.6)	−5.0 (23.0)	4.7 (40.5)
Average precipitation mm (inches)	39 (1.5)	36 (1.4)	41 (1.6)	39 (1.5)	58 (2.3)	59 (2.3)	48 (1.9)	47 (1.9)	43 (1.7)	44 (1.7)	39 (1.5)	43 (1.7)	536 (21.1)
Average precipitation days (≥ 1.0 mm)	9.1	7.3	7.9	6.7	7.5	7.4	6.5	5.2	6.1	6.3	6.3	7.8	84.1
Average relative humidity (%)	87.2	83.9	76.8	63.1	60.5	63.0	62.7	59.5	65.8	76.3	85.1	88.2	72.7
Source: NOAA

== Culture ==
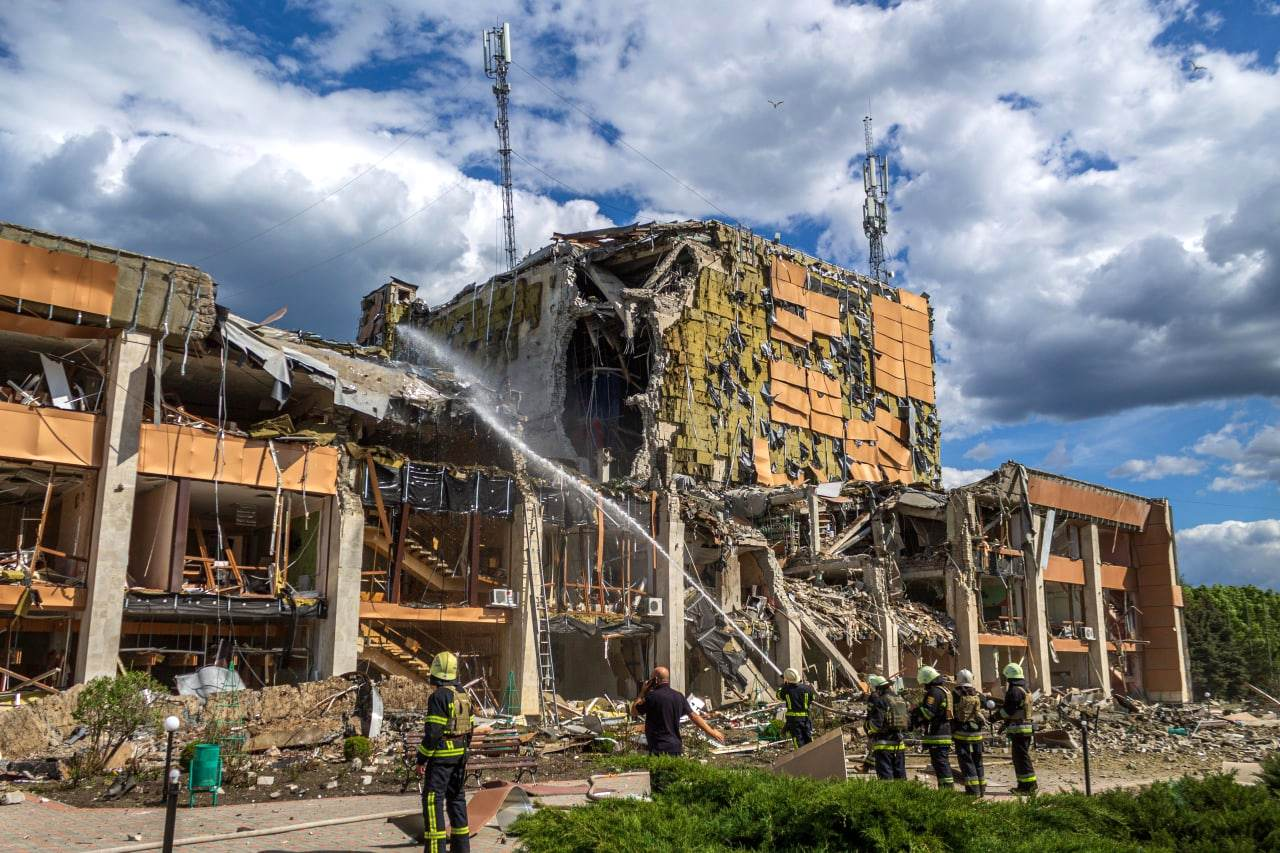
Lozova House of Culture after Russian shelling on 20 May 2022

Lozova had a well-developed cultural, sports, and recreational sector. The city's long-standing Lozova House of Culture was destroyed by a Russian missile strike during the Russian invasion in 2022.

There were clubs and clubs for children and teenagers, including the Lozova Children's Art Center. Lozova's sports are represented by several youth sports schools: Yunost, Olimpiya, and Lokomotiv. A significant number of athletes in the city compete in wrestling (freestyle wrestling, judo, sambo), as well as basketball, volleyball, and football. The city also has the Lokomotiv Stadium. The Lozova Football Club has competed at the regional and national levels.

=== Sights ===
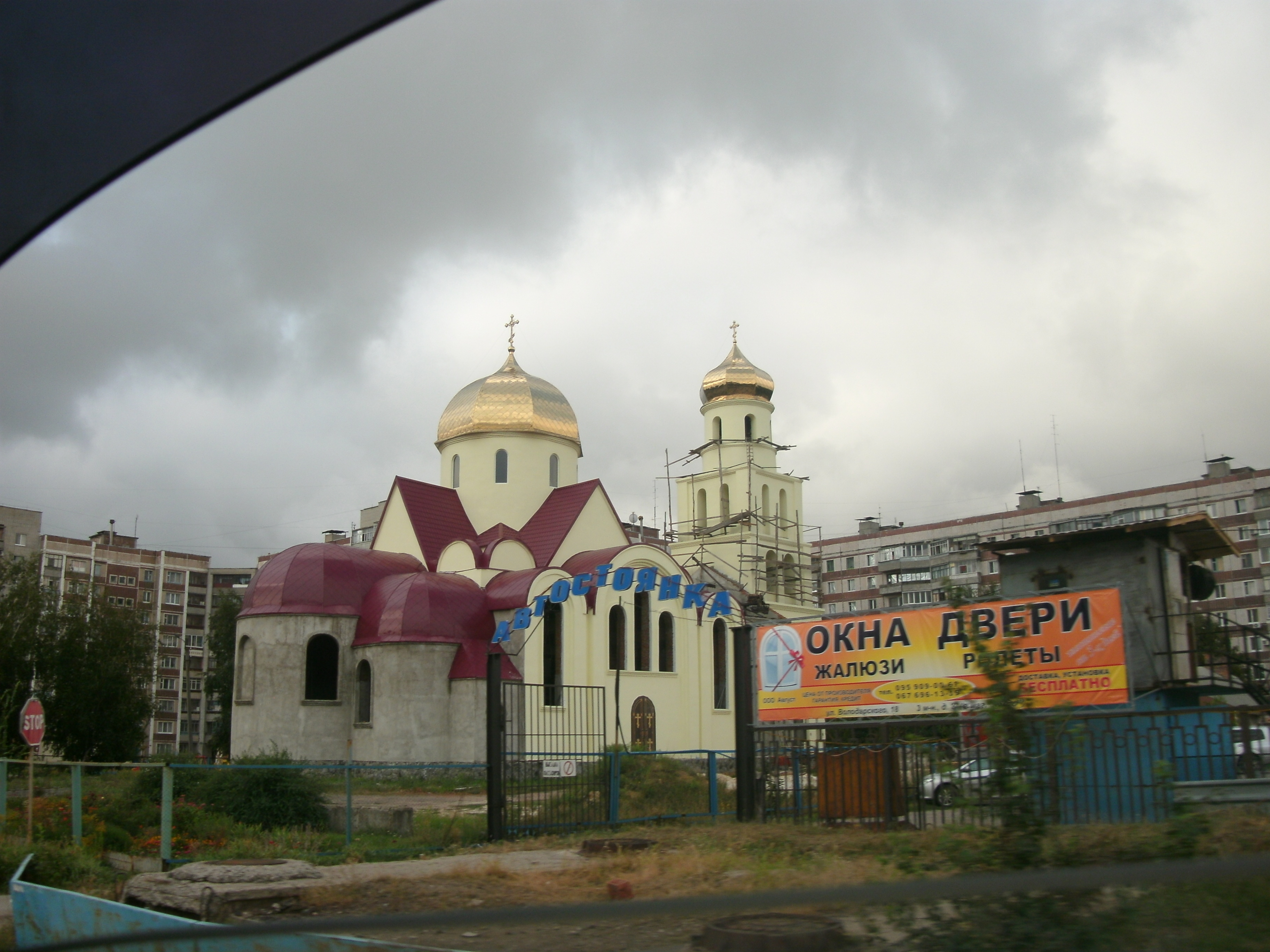
St. Peter and Paul Church under construction.

- Victory Day Park
- Archangel Michael Convent
- Railway Station. The station building was destroyed by the retreating occupiers, and after the 1941-1945 war, it was rebuilt according to the design of chief architect E. Lymar and architect Zeitlin. The current building of the Lozova station was commissioned in 1950. Even before the war, the design was exhibited at the World's Fair in Paris and won the Grand Prix. It was implemented in a greatly simplified form.
- Smolensk Cathedral
- Dikogo Street — mass grave of 93 Soviet soldiers
- Oktyabrskaya Street — mass grave of 456 Soviet soldiers
- Locomotive Depot — Monument to fellow countrymen. 1941-1945.
- City Cemetery — mass grave of 507 Soviet soldiers

==== Parks and squares ====
- Victory Park
- Druzhba Arboretum
- S. V. T. G. Shevchenko
- Lozova Heroes' Square
- Zheleznodorozhnik Park

==== Monuments and memorials ====
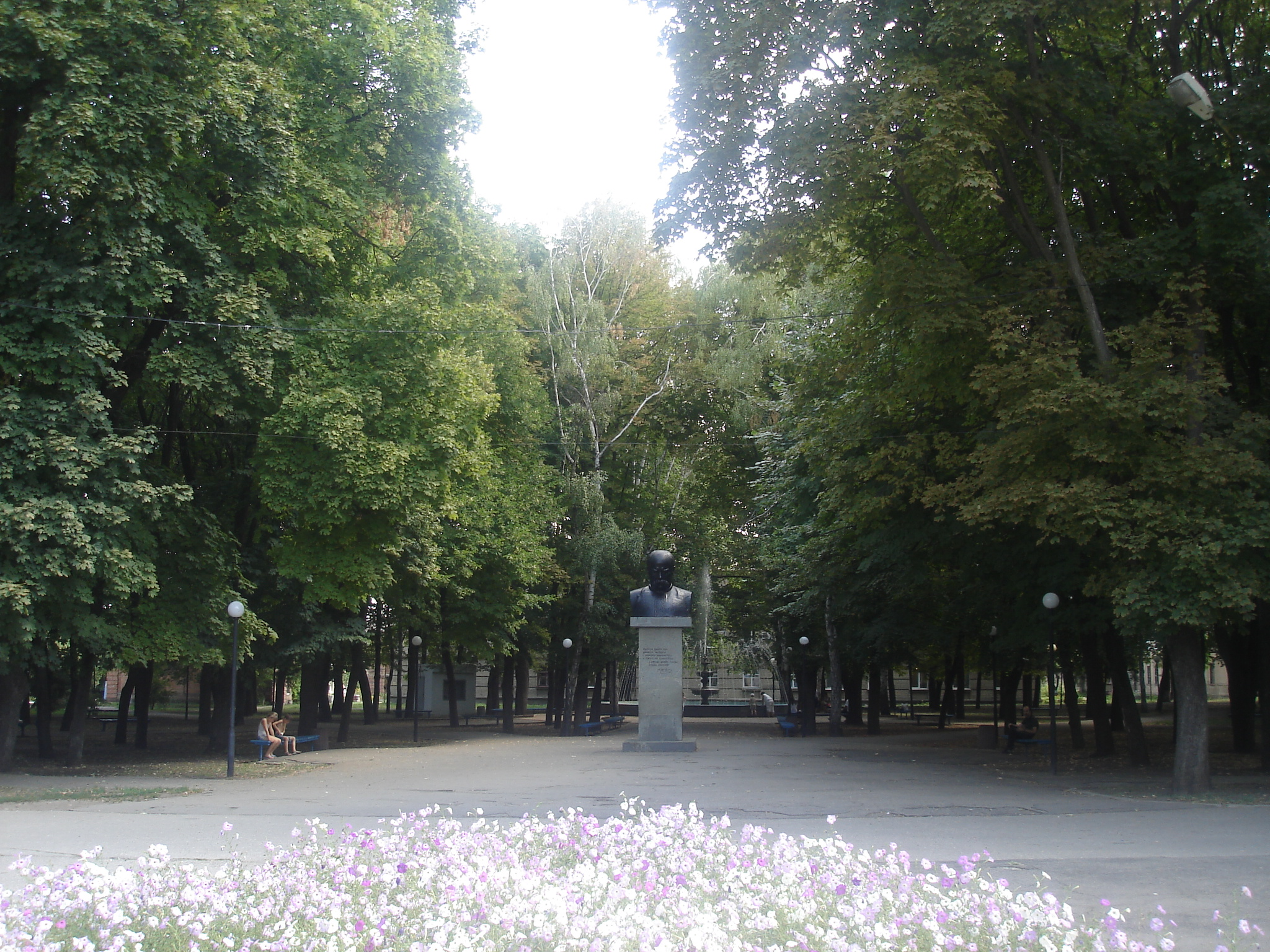
Shevchenko Square with the Monument of Taras Shevchenko

- Monument to the Soldiers of the UNR
- Monument of Taras Shevchenko
- Memorial to the Liberators of Lozova from the Nazi Invaders
- Monument to the "Lozovsky" Divisions
- Monument to the People's Militia
- Bust of Fyodor Suprun
- T-34 tank in honor of Nikolai Kucherenko, one of the tank's designers and a native of Lozova
- MiG-21F-13 in Pobeda Park
- Memorial plaque in honor of Lozovsky
- The Hammer and Sickle monument was dismantled in the winter of 2015.
- Monument to Lenin was dismantled in the summer of 2016.

== Demographics ==
As of the 2001 Ukrainian census, the city had a population of 64,627. The ethnic and linguistic composition was as follows:

Ethnic groups in Lozova
	percent
Ukrainians	79.00%
Russians	14.74%
Belarusians	0.45%
Armenians	0.17%
Gypsies	0.13%
others	0.27%

Native languages in Lozova
Languages	percent
Ukrainian	75.6%
Russian	18.5%
Belarusian	0.1%
Armenian	0.1%
others	0.3%

== Economy ==
The city has many retail establishments (including four markets) selling various goods wholesale and retail (consumer goods, agricultural products, groceries, automotive and specialized equipment and spare parts, hunting, fishing, and camping equipment, fuel and lubricants, building materials, and more).

The largest retail establishments are:

- Central Market. Located in the city center.
- Yuzhny Market. Located in the fifth microdistrict.
- Yugo-Zapadny Market in the third microdistrict.
- Yantar Market in the fourth microdistrict.
- The city has supermarkets of the wholesale and retail chains ATB Market, Silpo, Posad, and Spar. There are three ATB stores in the city, one Silpo, one Spar, and two Posad.

=== Industry ===
Lozova is one of the main industrial centers of the Slobozhanshchyna, the second largest city in the Kharkiv Oblast in terms of production volume. The city has a diverse industry, but the leading ones are mechanical engineering, light industry, and food processing. The city is home to numerous enterprises, the largest of which are:

- The Lozovsky Forge and Mechanical Plant is the largest plant in Lozova and the main manufacturer of stampings in the CIS. Its products include stampings and axles for tractors and vehicles, and a contract is being fulfilled to manufacture hulls for the BTR-3 and BTR-4.
- Lozova Metalworking Plant (61 Chekhova St.; unfortunately, no longer exists) (destroyed, closed)
- Lozova Traktorodetal Plant (1 Potemkina St.; products: components for agricultural machinery and automobiles)
- Lozova Molagro Plant (61 Yukhyma Berezovskogo St.; products: milk, butter, condensed milk, cream, sour cream) (closed)
- Lozova Sewing Factory (14 Pavlohradska St.; products: clothing, workwear, bed linen) (closed)
- Ukrspetsvagon UGC (Panyutino (Ukraine)|Panyutino settlement]; the oldest enterprise in Lozova, one of three licensed freight carriers on the Ukrainian Railways; products: gondola cars, Tank cars, hoppers)
- Lozovsky Dairy Plant (45 Gvardeyskaya St.; products: milk, cottage cheese, hard cheese, butter, sour cream) (closed)
- Lozovsky Printing House (4 Pervogo Maya St.; printed products)

=== Transportation ===
Lozova is a main rail hub within the Kharkiv Oblast. The city is also crossed by highways P-51 and T-2113. A road junction on the Kharkiv - Pavlohrad T-2107 highway. Bus station: services to Kharkiv, Donetsk, Dnipro, and in summer, Berdyansk and Kyrylivka.

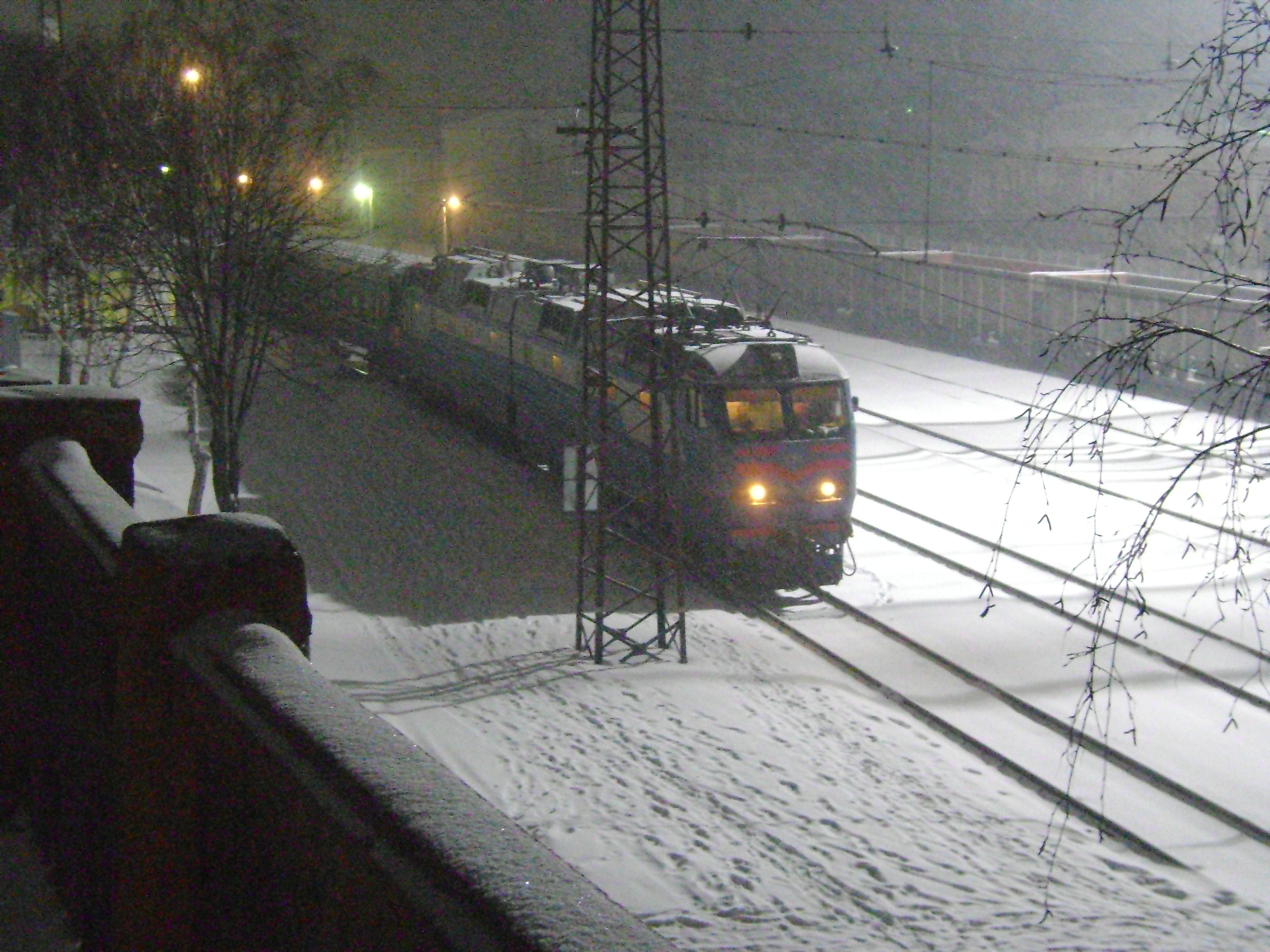
ЧС7 electric locomotive at Lozova station

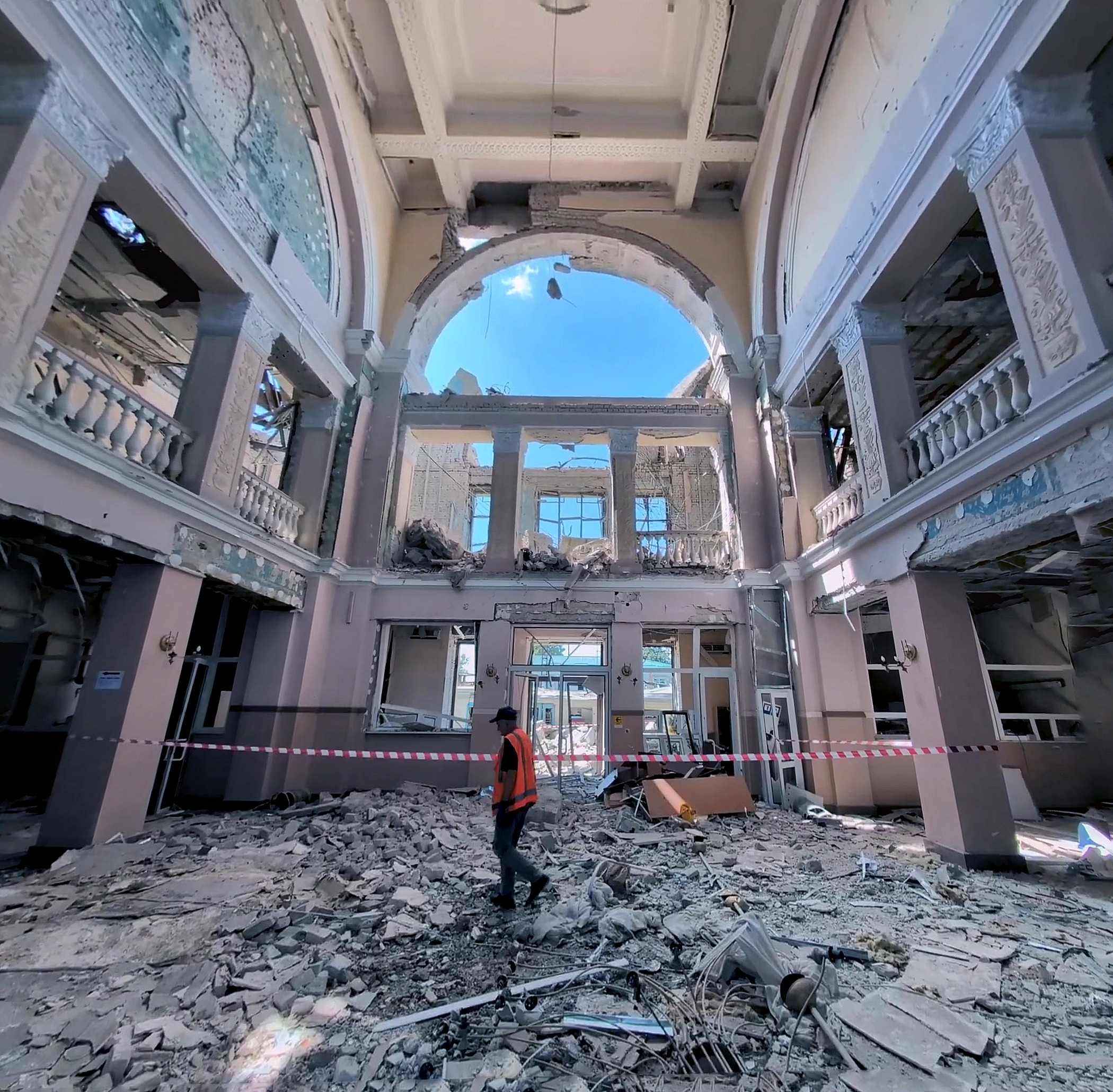
Lozova railway station after a Russian drone attack on 5 August 2025

In the spring of 1983, the Kharkiv branch of the Ukrkommunproekt Institute developed a project to build trolleybus lines. The first line was to connect the southwestern part of the city with the city center, the train station, and the industrial zone. A new bridge and overpass over the railway were planned for the trolleybus line. The project was never implemented.

City bus routes:

- 1-Ring 1
- 2-4 microdistrict-Rynok (Ring 2)
- 3-Ring 3
- 4-4 microdistrict-Brichuka Street
- 5-4 microdistrict-Gersivanovsky Khutor
- 6-Domakha-Rynok
- 7-6 microdistrict-Rynok
- 8-4 microdistrict-Brichuka Street
- 412-Domakha-Svetlovshchina
- 430-4 microdistrict-Bratolyubovka (Britay)
- 1687-4 microdistrict-Panyutino
- 1688-4 microdistrict-Panyutino (Zapadny)
- 1689-4 microdistrict-Khlebnoye
- 1691-Rynok-Panyutino
- 4 Chernigovskoye Microdistrict
- 4th Microdistrict - Svetlovshchina

Lozova is a major railway junction. From Lozova Station, railway lines run to Kharkiv, Poltava, Slavyansk, Sinelnikovo, and Simferopol. There is also a Lozova Locomotive Depot. Some trains to Crimea pass through Lozova, and several trains to the Caucasus run in the summer. During Soviet times, approximately 90% of all trains to the Caucasus traveled along the Kharkiv line via Lozova, but after the collapse of the USSR, all these trains were transferred to the Voronezh line.

The city is home to several Motor Transport Enterprises (MTPs): No. 16309, 16347, and others.

The Lozova Locomotive Depot of the Southern Railway's 9th locomotive department operates in the city. Its assigned fleet includes 2TE116 and ChME3 diesel locomotives and VL11 electric locomotives. The depot serves as a turnaround depot for VL8 electric locomotives from the Slavyansk locomotive department, and during the summer, for the ChS2 and ChS7 locomotives from the Melitopol locomotive department. Locomotives from the Nizhnedneprovsk-Uzel, Slavyansk, and Krasny Liman locomotive departments undergo maintenance at the PTOL.

== Notable people ==
- Leonid Skirko, Canadian bass-baritone opera singer of Ukrainian origin
- Anatol Rapoport, Jewish American mathematical psychologist
- Oleksandr Hladkyi, Ukrainian football player
- Vitaliy Zotov, Ukrainian basketball player
