= List of Holodomor memorials and monuments =

For the great famine of 1932/33 in the Soviet Ukraine

This is a list of memorials and monuments to the Holodomor and its millions of victims.

== Argentina ==
Image	Location	Description	Unveiled	Ref.
	Buenos Aires	Commemorative plaque for the victims of the Holodomor in the Metropolitan Cathedral of Buenos Aires	2008	

== Australia ==
Image	Location	Description	Unveiled	Ref.
	Adelaide	Memorial cross for the victims of the Holodomor at the Ukrainian Autocephalous St Michael's Church	1972	
	Canberra	Memorial site for the victims of the Holodomor	1985	
	Melbourne	Monument to the victims of the Holodomor	1983	

== Belgium ==
Image	Location	Description	Unveiled	Ref.
	Genk	Monument to the victims of the Holodomor	2003	

== Brazil ==
Image	Location	Description	Unveiled	Ref.
	Curitiba	Monument to the victims of the Holodomor	2003	

== Germany ==
Image	Location	Description	Unveiled	Ref.
	Munich	Monument to the victims of the Holodomor near the Cathedral of the Intercession of the Mother of God and of St. Andrew	2008	

== France ==
Image	Location	Description	Unveiled	Ref.
	Holtzheim	Memorial to the victims of the Holodomor	2008	

== Israel ==
Image	Location	Description	Unveiled	Ref.
	Jerusalem	Memorial to the victims of the Holodomor	2025	

== Italy ==
Image	Location	Description	Unveiled	Ref.
	Cagliari	Monument to the victims of the Holodomor im Monte Claro Park	2016	

== Canada ==
Image	Location	Description	Unveiled
	North Battleford	Monument to the victims of the Holodomor	2014
	Calgary	Monument to the victims of the Holodomor	1999
	Edmonton	Monument to the victims of the Holodomor	1983
	Kitchener, Ontario	Monument at the Ukrainian Catholic Transfiguration Church	2014
	Mississauga	Monument at the Ukrainian Catholic Church of the Dormition of the Mother of God	
	Ontario, Hawkstone	Ukrainian National Federation of Canada, Oselia Sokil	1989
	Regina, Saskatchewan	Memorial to the victims of the Holodomor in Wascana Park	2015
	St. Paul, Alberta	Monument to the victims of the Holodomor "Broken Wheat"	
	Toronto	Memorial site for the victims of the Holodomor	2018
	Toronto	Monument to the victims of the Holodomor at the Ukrainian Catholic Church of St Demetrius, Etobicoke	
	Windsor, Ontario	Monument to the victims of the Holodomor	2005
	Winnipeg	Monument to the victims of the Holodomor	1984
	Winnipeg	Monument to the victims of the Holodomor: Bitter Memories of Childhood	2014

== North Macedonia ==
Image	Location	Description	Unveiled	Ref.
	Čair Municipality	Monument to the victims of the Holodomor	2025	

== Austria ==
Image	Location	Description	Unveiled	Ref.
	Wien, Perchtoldsdorf	Holodomor memorial site at the Ukrainian Cultural and Information Centre	2003	

== Poland ==
Image	Location	Description	Unveiled	Ref.
	Krakau	Memorial to the victims of the Ukrainian Holodomor	2011	
	Lublin	Memorial to the victims of the Holodomor	2014	
	Przemyśl	Memorial to the victims of the Holodomor		
	Warschau	Memorial to the victims of the Holodomor	2009	

== Portugal ==
Image	Location	Description	Unveiled	Ref.
	Lissabon	Commemorative plaque for the victims of the Holodomor	2024	

== Slovakia ==
Image	Location	Description	Unveiled	Ref.
	Prešov	Memorial cross at the Cathedral of the Holy Prince Alexander Nevsky	2007	

== Ukraine ==
Image	Location	Raion	Administrative Unit	Description	Unveiled	Ref.
	İzumrudne	Dzhankoi raion	Autonomous Republic of Crimea	Memorial stone for the victims of the Holodomor	2008	
	Myrnivka	Dzhankoi raion	Autonomous Republic of Crimea	Memorial stone for the victims of the Holodomor	2008	
	Pakharivka	Dzhankoi raion	Autonomous Republic of Crimea	Memorial stone for the victims of the Holodomor	2008	
	Simferopol	Simferopol Raion	Autonomous Republic of Crimea	Memorial cross for the victims of the Holodomor	2000	
	Zilynne	Dzhankoi raion	Autonomous Republic of Crimea	Memorial stone for the victims of the Holodomor	2008	
	Sevastopol	-	Sevastopol	Memorial stone for the victims of the Holodomor		
	Budyshche	Cherkasy Raion	Cherkasy Oblast	Memorial cross for the victims of the Holodomor		
	Cherkasy	Cherkasy Raion	Cherkasy Oblast	Memorial to the victims of the Holodomor	2006	
	Dubiivka	Cherkasy Raion	Cherkasy Oblast	Memorial to the victims of the Holodomor		
	Dumantsi	Cherkasy Raion	Cherkasy Oblast	Memorial to the victims of the Holodomor	2016	
	Kaniv	Cherkasy Raion	Cherkasy Oblast	Memorial cross for the victims of the Holodomor		
	Korsun-Shevchenkivskyi	Cherkasy Raion	Cherkasy Oblast	Memorial cross for the victims of the Holodomor		
	Lozivok	Cherkasy Raion	Cherkasy Oblast	Memorial to the victims of the Holodomor	2016	
	Medvedivka	Cherkasy Raion	Cherkasy Oblast	Memorial cross for the victims of the Holodomor		
	Mozhny	Cherkasy Raion	Cherkasy Oblast	Memorial cross for the victims of the Holodomor		
	Sloboda	Cherkasy Raion	Cherkasy Oblast	Memorial to the victims of the Holodomor and political repression		
	Smila	Cherkasy Raion	Cherkasy Oblast	Memorial cross for the victims of the Holodomor		
	Subotiv	Cherkasy Raion	Cherkasy Oblast	Memorial cross for the victims of the Holodomor		
	Apolianka	Uman Raion	Cherkasy Oblast	Memorial to the victims of the Holodomor		
	Avramivka	Uman Raion	Cherkasy Oblast	Memorial cross for the victims of the Holodomor		
	Babanka	Uman Raion	Cherkasy Oblast	Memorial to the victims of the Holodomor		
	Bachkuryne	Uman Raion	Cherkasy Oblast	Memorial to the victims of the Holodomor	1990	
	Berestivets	Uman Raion	Cherkasy Oblast	Memorial to the victims of the Holodomor		
	Berezivka	Uman Raion	Cherkasy Oblast	Memorial to the victims of the Holodomor		
	Botvynivka	Uman Raion	Cherkasy Oblast	Memorial to the victims of the Holodomor		
	Chervonyi Kut	Uman Raion	Cherkasy Oblast	Memorial to the victims of the Holodomor		
	Chorna Kamianka	Uman Raion	Cherkasy Oblast	Memorial to the victims of the Holodomor		
	Dibrivka	Uman Raion	Cherkasy Oblast	Memorial to the victims of the Holodomor	2007	
	Dmytruschky	Uman Raion	Cherkasy Oblast	Memorial to the victims of the Holodomor		
	Dobra	Uman Raion	Cherkasy Oblast	Memorial to the victims of the Holodomor		
	Dobrovody	Uman Raion	Cherkasy Oblast	Memorial cross for the victims of the Holodomor		
	Dolynka	Uman Raion	Cherkasy Oblast	Memorial to the victims of the Holodomor		
	Dzenzelivka	Uman Raion	Cherkasy Oblast	Memorial to the victims of the Holodomor		
	Herezhenivka	Uman Raion	Cherkasy Oblast	Memorial to the victims of the Holodomor		
	Hreblia	Uman Raion	Cherkasy Oblast	Memorial to the victims of the Holodomor		
	Hrodzeve	Uman Raion	Cherkasy Oblast	Memorial to the victims of the Holodomor		
	Ivakhny	Uman Raion	Cherkasy Oblast	Memorial cross for the victims of the Holodomor		
	Ivanky	Uman Raion	Cherkasy Oblast	Memorial to the victims of the Holodomor		
	Jurkivka	Uman Raion	Cherkasy Oblast	Memorial cross for the victims of the Holodomor		
	KhalaIidove	Uman Raion	Cherkasy Oblast	Memorial cross for the victims of the Holodomor		
	Kharkivka	Uman Raion	Cherkasy Oblast	Memorial cross for the victims of the Holodomor		
	Kheilove	Uman Raion	Cherkasy Oblast	Memorial cross for the victims of the Holodomor		
	Khyzhnia	Uman Raion	Cherkasy Oblast	Memorial cross for the victims of the Holodomor		
	Kniazha Krynytsia	Uman Raion	Cherkasy Oblast	Memorial to the victims of the Holodomor		
	Kniazhyky	Uman Raion	Cherkasy Oblast	Memorial to the victims of the Holodomor		
	Kocherzhynzi	Uman Raion	Cherkasy Oblast	Memorial to the victims of the Holodomor		
	Konelska Popivka	Uman Raion	Cherkasy Oblast	Memorial to the victims of the Holodomor		
	Kopiuvata	Uman Raion	Cherkasy Oblast	Memorial to the victims of the Holodomor and political repressions		
	Korytnia	Uman Raion	Cherkasy Oblast	Memorial to the victims of the Holodomor		
	Kosenivka	Uman Raion	Cherkasy Oblast	Memorial to the victims of the Holodomor		
	Krasnopilka	Uman Raion	Cherkasy Oblast	Memorial to the victims of the Holodomor		
	Krachkivka	Uman Raion	Cherkasy Oblast	Memorial to the victims of the Holodomor		
	Kryvets	Uman Raion	Cherkasy Oblast	Memorial cross for the victims of the Holodomor		
	Kyslyn	Uman Raion	Cherkasy Oblast	Memorial to the victims of the Holodomor		
	Lemishchykha	Uman Raion	Cherkasy Oblast	Memorial cross for the victims of the Holodomor		
	Lukashivka	Uman Raion	Cherkasy Oblast	Memorial to the victims of the Holodomor		
	Lytvynivka	Uman Raion	Cherkasy Oblast	Memorial to the victims of the Holodomor		
	Mala Mankivka	Uman Raion	Cherkasy Oblast	Memorial cross for the victims of the Holodomor		
	Mala Sevastianivka	Uman Raion	Cherkasy Oblast	Memorial to the victims of the Holodomor		
	Mariyka	Uman Raion	Cherkasy Oblast	Memorial cross for the victims of the Holodomor		
	Matwiikha	Uman Raion	Cherkasy Oblast	Memorial cross for the victims of the Holodomor		
	Monastyryshche	Uman Raion	Cherkasy Oblast	Memorial to the victims of the Holodomor	2018	
	Nahirna	Uman Raion	Cherkasy Oblast	Memorial cross for the victims of the Holodomor		
	Nahirna	Uman Raion	Cherkasy Oblast	Memorial to the victims of the Holodomor		
	Nesterivka	Uman Raion	Cherkasy Oblast	Memorial to the victims of the Holodomor		
	Nova Hreblia	Uman Raion	Cherkasy Oblast	Memorial to the victims of the Holodomor		
	Novosilka	Uman Raion	Cherkasy Oblast	Memorial to the victims of the Holodomor	1993	
	Oksanyna	Uman Raion	Cherkasy Oblast	Memorial to the victims of the Holodomor		
	Oleksandrivka	Uman Raion	Cherkasy Oblast	Memorial to the victims of the Holodomor		
	Ostrozhany	Uman Raion	Cherkasy Oblast	Memorial cross for the victims of the Holodomor		
	Palanka	Uman Raion	Cherkasy Oblast	Memorial to the victims of the Holodomor		
	Palanochka	Uman Raion	Cherkasy Oblast	Memorial to the victims of the Holodomor		
	Pikivets	Uman Raion	Cherkasy Oblast	Memorial to the victims of the Holodomor		
	Podibna	Uman Raion	Cherkasy Oblast	Memorial to the victims of the Holodomor		
	Polovynchyk	Uman Raion	Cherkasy Oblast	Memorial to the victims of the Holodomor		
	Pomynyk	Uman Raion	Cherkasy Oblast	Memorial to the victims of the Holodomor		
	Popivka	Uman Raion	Cherkasy Oblast	Memorial to the victims of the Holodomor		
	Popudnia	Uman Raion	Cherkasy Oblast	Memorial to the victims of the Holodomor		
	Posuhivka	Uman Raion	Cherkasy Oblast	Memorial to the victims of the Holodomor	1993	
	Puhachivka	Uman Raion	Cherkasy Oblast	Memorial to the victims of the Holodomor		
	Rodnykivka	Uman Raion	Cherkasy Oblast	Memorial to the victims of the Holodomor		
	Ropotukha	Uman Raion	Cherkasy Oblast	Memorial to the victims of the Holodomor	1990	
	Rusalivka	Uman Raion	Cherkasy Oblast	Memorial cross for the victims of the Holodomor		
	Ryzhavka	Uman Raion	Cherkasy Oblast	Memorial to the victims of the Holodomor		
	Sarny	Uman Raion	Cherkasy Oblast	Memorial cross for the victims of the Holodomor		
	Satanivka	Uman Raion	Cherkasy Oblast	Memorial to the victims of the Holodomor		
	Shabastivka	Uman Raion	Cherkasy Oblast	Memorial cross for the victims of the Holodomor		
	Sharnopil	Uman Raion	Cherkasy Oblast,	Memorial to the victims of the Holodomor		
	Shukaivoda	Uman Raion	Cherkasy Oblast	Memorial to the victims of the Holodomor		
	Shuliaky	Uman Raion	Cherkasy Oblast	Memorial cross for the victims of the Holodomor		
	Sokolivka	Uman Raion	Cherkasy Oblast	Memorial cross for the victims of the Holodomor		
	Stari Babany	Uman Raion	Cherkasy Oblast	Memorial to the victims of the Holodomor		
	Tanske	Uman Raion	Cherkasy Oblast	Memorial to the victims of the Holodomor		
	Teolyn	Uman Raion	Cherkasy Oblast	Memorial to the victims of the Holodomor		
	Teterivka	Uman Raion	Cherkasy Oblast	Memorial cross for the victims of the Holodomor		
	Tsybuliv	Uman Raion	Cherkasy Oblast	Memorial to the victims of the Holodomor		
	Tykhyi Khutir	Uman Raion	Cherkasy Oblast	Memorial cross for the victims of the Holodomor		
	Tymoshivka	Uman Raion	Cherkasy Oblast	Memorial to the victims of the Holodomor		
	Tynivka	Uman Raion	Cherkasy Oblast	Memorial to the victims of the Holodomor		
	Uhluvatka	Uman Raion	Cherkasy Oblast	Memorial to the victims of the Holodomor		
	Velyka Sevastianivka	Uman Raion	Cherkasy Oblast	Memorial to the victims of the Holodomor		
	Verbuvata	Uman Raion	Cherkasy Oblast	Memorial to the victims of the Holodomor		
	Zhashkiv	Uman Raion	Cherkasy Oblast	Memorial to the victims of the Holodomor		
	Zelenyi Rih	Uman Raion	Cherkasy Oblast	Memorial cross for the victims of the Holodomor		
	Ziubrykha	Uman Raion	Cherkasy Oblast	Memorial cross for the victims of the Holodomor		
	Zoriane	Uman Raion	Cherkasy Oblast	Memorial cross for the victims of the Holodomor		
	Drimajlivka	Kulykivka Raion	Cherkasy Oblast	Memorial cross for the victims of the Holodomor		
	Zhytnyky	Uman Raion	Cherkasy Oblast	Memorial to the victims of the Holodomor		
	Bezpalche	Zolotonosha Raion	Cherkasy Oblast	Memorial to the victims of the Holodomor		
	Helmiaziv	Zolotonosha Raion	Cherkasy Oblast	Memorial to the victims of the Holodomor		
	Nekhaiky	Zolotonosha Raion	Cherkasy Oblast	Memorial to the victims of the Holodomor		
	Revbyntsi	Zolotonosha Raion	Cherkasy Oblast	Memorial to the victims of the Holodomor		
	Antonivka	Zvenyhorodka Raion	Cherkasy Oblast	Memorial to the victims of the Holodomor		
	Dibrivka	Zvenyhorodka Raion	Cherkasy Oblast	Memorial to the victims of the Holodomor	2023	
	Hlybochok	Zvenyhorodka Raion	Cherkasy Oblast	Memorial to the victims of the Holodomor		
	Jurkivka	Zvenyhorodka Raion	Cherkasy Oblast	Memorial to the victims of the Holodomor		
	Kapustyne	Zvenyhorodka Raion	Cherkasy Oblast	Memorial to the victims of the Holodomor	2008	
	Kalynopil	Zvenyhorodka Raion	Cherkasy Oblast	Memorial to the victims of the Holodomor		
	Moryntsi	Zvenyhorodka Raion	Cherkasy Oblast	Kurgan to the victims of the Holodomor		
	Skalyvatka	Zvenyhorodka Raion	Cherkasy Oblast	Memorial to the victims of the Holodomor	2024	
	Stebne	Zvenyhorodka Raion	Cherkasy Oblast	Memorial cross for the victims of the Holodomor		
	Stebne	Zvenyhorodka Raion	Cherkasy Oblast	Memorial cross for the victims of the Holodomor		
	Stetsivka	Zvenyhorodka Raion	Cherkasy Oblast	Memorial to the victims of the Holodomor		
	Stupychne	Zvenyhorodka Raion	Cherkasy Oblast	Memorial to the victims of the Holodomor		
	Syhnaiivka	Zvenyhorodka Raion	Cherkasy Oblast	Memorial to the victims of the Holodomor		
	Zvenyhorodka	Zvenyhorodka Raion	Cherkasy Oblast	Memorial to the victims of the Holodomor		
	Chychyrkosivka	Zvenyhorodka Raion	Cherkasy Oblast	Memorial to the victims of the Holodomor		
	Drozdivka	Chernihiv Raion	Chernihiv Oblast	Memorial cross for the victims of the Holodomor		
	Kozelets	Chernihiv Raion	Chernihiv Oblast	Memorial cross for the victims of the Holodomor	2008	
	Kulykivka	Chernihiv Raion	Chernihiv Oblast	Memorial to the victims of the Holodomor	2008	
	Lemeshi	Chernihiv Raion	Chernihiv Oblast	Memorial to the victims of the Holodomor		
	Malyi Lystven	Chernihiv Raion	Chernihiv Oblast	Memorial cross for the victims of the Holodomor	2007	
	Orlivka	Chernihiv Raion	Chernihiv Oblast	Memorial cross for the victims of the Holodomor	2007	
	Pliokhiv	Chernihiv Raion	Chernihiv Oblast	Memorial cross for the victims of the Holodomor	2007	
	Stavyske	Chernihiv Raion	Chernihiv Oblast	Memorial cross for the victims of the Holodomor		
	Zvenychiv	Chernihiv Raion	Chernihiv Oblast	Memorial cross for the victims of the Holodomor	2008	
	Mena	Koriukivka Raion	Chernihiv Oblast	Memorial to the victims of the Holodomor	2007	
	Snovsk	Koriukivka Raion	Chernihiv Oblast	Memorial to the victims of the Holodomor	2008	
	Sosnytsia	Koriukivka Raion	Chernihiv Oblast	Memorial cross for the victims of the Holodomor	2007	
	Tykhonovychi	Koriukivka Raion	Chernihiv Oblast	Memorial cross for the victims of the Holodomor	2008	
	Bakhmach	Nizhyn Raion	Chernihiv Oblast	Memorial cross for the victims of the Holodomor	2007	
	Baturyn	Nizhyn Raion	Chernihiv Oblast	Memorial to the victims of the Holodomor		
	Bobrovytsia	Nizhyn Raion	Chernihiv Oblast	Memorial to the victims of the Holodomor		
	Kozatske	Nizhyn Raion	Chernihiv Oblast	Memorial cross for the victims of the Holodomor	2007	
	Nizhyn	Nizhyn Raion	Chernihiv Oblast	Memorial to the victims of the Holodomor	2007	
	Shapovalivka	Nizhyn Raion	Chernihiv Oblast	Memorial cross for the victims of the Holodomor	2008	
	Vepryk	Nizhyn Raion	Chernihiv Oblast	Memorial cross for the victims of the Holodomor		
	Viktorivka	Nizhyn Raion	Chernihiv Oblast	Memorial cross for the victims of the Holodomor	2008	
	Berezhivka	Pryluky Raion	Chernihiv Oblast	Memorial cross for the victims of the Holodomor	2007	
	Huzhivka	Pryluky Raion	Chernihiv Oblast	Memorial cross for the victims of the Holodomor	2008	
	Ichnia	Pryluky Raion	Chernihiv Oblast	Memorial cross for the victims of the Holodomor	2007	
	Ivanytsia	Pryluky Raion	Chernihiv Oblast	Memorial to the victims of the Holodomor	1992	
	Krupychpole	Pryluky Raion	Chernihiv Oblast	Memorial cross for the victims of the Holodomor	2007	
	Lynovytsia	Pryluky Raion	Chernihiv Oblast	Memorial cross for the victims of the Holodomor	2007	
	Mala Divytsia	Pryluky Raion	Chernihiv Oblast	Memorial cross for the victims of the Holodomor	2008	
	Oleksyntsi	Pryluky Raion	Chernihiv Oblast	Memorial cross for the victims of the Holodomor		
	Serhiivka	Pryluky Raion	Chernihiv Oblast	Memorial cross for the victims of the Holodomor	2003	
	Sokyryntsi	Pryluky Raion	Chernihiv Oblast	Memorial to the victims of the Holodomor	1993	
	Sukhopolova	Pryluky Raion	Chernihiv Oblast	Memorial to the victims of the Holodomor	2008	
	Varva	Pryluky Raion	Chernihiv Oblast	Memorial cross for the victims of the Holodomor		
	Kharkove	Talalaivka Raion	Chernihiv Oblast	Memorial cross for the victims of the Holodomor	2008	
	Czernowitz	Chernivtsi Raion	Chernivtsi Oblast,	Memorial to the victims of the Holodomor	2018	
	Dnipro	Dnipro Raion	Dnipropetrovsk Oblast	Memorial cross for the victims of the Holodomor	2006	
	Dnipro	Dnipro Raion	Dnipropetrovsk Oblast	Memorial to the victims of the Holodomor	2008	
	Dnipro	Dnipro Raion	Dnipropetrovsk Oblast	Memorial stone for the victims of the Holodomor		
	Novopidkriazh	Dnipro Raion	Dnipropetrovsk Oblast	Memorial cross for the victims of the Holodomor		
	Tsarychanka	Dnipro Raion	Dnipropetrovsk Oblast	Memorial to the victims of the Holodomor		
	Yelyzavetivka	Dnipro Raion	Dnipropetrovsk Oblast	Memorial cross for the victims of the Holodomor		
	Auly	Kamianske Raion	Dnipropetrovsk Oblast	Memorial cross for the victims of the Holodomor		
	Dniprovske	Kamianske Raion	Dnipropetrovsk Oblast	Memorial cross for the victims of the Holodomor	1993	
	Kamianske	Kamianske Raion	Dnipropetrovsk Oblast	Memorial to the victims of the Holodomor	1997	
	Kamianka, Apostolove	Kryvyi Rih Raion	Dnipropetrovsk Oblast	Memorial cross for the victims of the Holodomor		
	Krynychky	Kamianske Raion	Dnipropetrovsk Oblast	Memorial to the victims of the Holodomor		
	Kryvyi Rih	Kryvyi Rih Raion	Dnipropetrovsk Oblast	Memorial to the victims of the Holodomor and political repression	2008	
	Kryvyi Rih	Kryvyi Rih Raion	Dnipropetrovsk Oblast	Memorial cross for the victims of the Holodomor	2007	
	Kryvyi Rih	Kryvyi Rih Raion	Dnipropetrovsk Oblast	Memorial to the victims of the Holodomor	2006	
	Loboikivka	Kryvyi Rih Raion	Dnipropetrovsk Oblast	Memorial to the victims of the Holodomor		
	Lozuvatka	Kryvyi Rih Raion	Dnipropetrovsk Oblast	Memorial to the victims of the Holodomor		
	Piatykhatky	Kamianske Raion	Dnipropetrovsk Oblast	Memorial to the victims of the Holodomor	1990	
	Shyroke	Kryvyi Rih Raion	Dnipropetrovsk Oblast	Memorial to the victims of the Holodomor	1993	
	Shyroke	Kryvyi Rih Raion	Dnipropetrovsk Oblast	Monument to the orphanage children who fell victim to the Holodomor	2004	
	Sofiivka	Kryvyi Rih Raion	Dnipropetrovsk Oblast	Memorial cross for the victims of the Holodomor		
	Zhovti Vody	Kamianske Raion	Dnipropetrovsk Oblast	Memorial to the victims of the Holodomor	2003	
	Verchniodniprovsk	Kamianske Raion	Dnipropetrovsk Oblast	Memorial to the victims of the Holodomor		
	Ocheretuvate	Mahdalynivka Raion	Dnipropetrovsk Oblast	Memorial cross for the victims of the Holodomor		
	Marhanets	Nikopol Raion	Dnipropetrovsk Oblast	Memorial to the victims of the Holodomor		
	Novokyivka	Nikopol Raion	Dnipropetrovsk Oblast	Memorial to the victims of the Holodomor		
	Pokrovske	Nikopol Raion	Dnipropetrovsk Oblast	Memorial cross for the victims of the Holodomor		
	Sholokhove	Nikopol Raion	Dnipropetrovsk Oblast	Memorial cross for the victims of the Holodomor		
	Ternivka	Pavlohrad Raion	Dnipropetrovsk Oblast	Memorial to the victims of the Holodomor		
	Zhemchuzhne	Pavlohrad Raion	Dnipropetrovsk Oblast	Memorial cross for the victims of the Holodomor		
	Cherneсhchyna	Samar Raion	Dnipropetrovsk Oblast	Memorial cross for the victims of the Holodomor		
	Pereshchepyne	Samar Raion	Dnipropetrovsk Oblast	Memorial cross for the victims of the Holodomor	2007	
	Shevchenkivka	Samar Raion	Dnipropetrovsk Oblast	Memorial cross for the victims of the Holodomor		
	Mezhova	Synelnykove Raion	Dnipropetrovsk Oblast	Memorial stone for the victims of the Holodomor		
	Synelnykove	Synelnykove Raion	Dnipropetrovsk Oblast	Memorial cross for the victims of the Holodomor		
	Vasylkivka	Synelnykove Raion	Dnipropetrovsk Oblast	Memorial cross for the victims of the Holodomor		
	Siversk	Bakhmut Raion	Donetsk Oblast	Memorial cross for the victims of the Holodomor		
	Toretsk	Bakhmut Raion	Donetsk Oblast	Memorial cross for the victims of the Holodomor	2008	
	Blahodatne	Donetsk Raion	Donetsk Oblast	Memorial to the victims of the Holodomor	2008	
	Donetsk	Donetsk Raion	Donetsk Oblast	Memorial stone for the victims of the Holodomor	2008	
	Yasynuvata	Donetsk Raion	Donetsk Oblast	Memorial cross for the victims of the Holodomor		
	Debaltseve	Horlivka Raion	Donetsk Oblast	Memorial stone for the victims of the Holodomor	2008	
	Horlivka	Horlivka Raion	Donetsk Oblast	Commemorative plaque for the victims of the Holodomor and political repression		
	Snizhne	Horlivka Raion	Donetsk Oblast	Memorial to the victims of the Holodomor and political repression	2007	
	Yenakiieve	Horlivka Raion	Donetsk Oblast	Memorial cross for the victims of the Holodomor		
	Dokuchaievsk	Kalmiuske Raion	Donetsk Oblast	Memorial stone for the victims of the Holodomor		
	Hrekovo-Oleksandrivka	Kalmiuske Raion	Donetsk Oblast	Memorial stone for the victims of the Holodomor	2008	
	Konkove	Kalmiuske Raion	Donetsk Oblast	Memorial stone for the victims of the Holodomor	2008	
	Kuznetsovo-Mykhailivka	Kalmiuske Raion	Donetsk Oblast	Memorial to the victims of the Holodomor	2007	
	Bylbasivka	Kramatorsk Raion	Donetsk Oblast	Memorial stone for the victims of the Holodomor		
	Kramatorsk	Kramatorsk Raion	Donetsk Oblast	Memorial to the victims of the Holodomor	2007	
	Rubtsi	Kramatorsk Raion	Donetsk Oblast	Memorial cross for the victims of the Holodomor	1993	
	Lyman	Lyman Raion	Donetsk Oblast	Memorial to the victims of the Holodomor		
	Mariupol	Mariupol Raion	Donetsk Oblast	Memorial to the victims of the Holodomor and political repression. The monument was demolished in 2022 following the Russian invasion of Ukraine.	2004	
	Mykilske	Mariupol Raion	Donetsk Oblast	Memorial stone for the victims of the Holodomor	2008	
	Dobropillia	Pokrovsk Raion	Donetsk Oblast	Memorial cross for the victims of the Holodomor	2007	
	Pokrovsk	Pokrovsk Raion	Donetsk Oblast	Memorial to the victims of the Holodomor		
	Selydove	Pokrovsk Raion	Donetsk Oblast	Memorial to the victims of the Holodomor		
	Volnovakha	Volnovakha Raion	Donetsk Oblast	Memorial stone for the victims of the Holodomor		
	Mysliv	Kalush Raion	Ivano-Frankivsk Oblast	Memorial cross for the victims of the Holodomor		
	Nadvirna	Nadvirna Raion	Ivano-Frankivsk Oblast	Commemorative plaque for the victims of the Holodomor		
	Chepil	Balakliia Raion	Kharkiv Oblast	Memorial to the victims of political repression and the Holodomor		
	Abasivka	Berestyn Raion	Kharkiv Oblast	Memorial to the victims of the Holodomor	1990	
	Beresivka	Berestyn Raion	Kharkiv Oblast	Memorial cross for the victims of the Holodomor	2003	
	Berestyn	Berestyn Raion	Kharkiv Oblast	Memorial cross for the victims of the Holodomor	1998	
	Besarabivka	Berestyn Raion	Kharkiv Oblast	Memorial cross for the victims of the Holodomor		
	Kehychivka	Berestyn Raion	Kharkiv Oblast	Memorial stone for the victims of the Holodomor	2002	
	Petrivka, Natalyne settlement hromada	Berestyn Raion	Kharkiv Oblast	Memorial cross for the victims of the Holodomor	1991	
	Sakhnovshchyna	Berestyn Raion	Kharkiv Oblast	Memorial cross for the victims of the Holodomor		
	Shliakhove	Berestyn Raion	Kharkiv Oblast	Memorial cross for the victims of the Holodomor	1988	
	Bohodukhiv	Bohodukhiv Raion	Kharkiv Oblast	Memorial cross for the victims of the Holodomor	2004	
	Bratenytsia	Bohodukhiv Raion	Kharkiv Oblast	Memorial cross for the victims of the Holodomor	2007	
	Dmytrivka	Bohodukhiv Raion	Kharkiv Oblast	Memorial cross for the victims of the Holodomor	2007	
	Hubarivka	Bohodukhiv Raion	Kharkiv Oblast	Memorial cross for the victims of the Holodomor	2004	
	Kaplunivka	Bohodukhiv Raion	Kharkiv Oblast	Memorial cross for the victims of the Holodomor	1990	
	Khrushchova Mykytivka	Bohodukhiv Raion	Kharkiv Oblast	Memorial cross for the victims of the Holodomor	2007	
	Kobzarivka	Bohodukhiv Raion	Kharkiv Oblast	Memorial to the victims of the Holodomor	2003	
	Kolomak	Bohodukhiv Raion	Kharkiv Oblast	Memorial cross for the victims of the Holodomor		
	Kolontaiv	Bohodukhiv Raion	Kharkiv Oblast	Memorial cross for the victims of the Holodomor	1997	
	Korbyni Ivany	Bohodukhiv Raion	Kharkiv Oblast	Memorial cross for the victims of the Holodomor	2007	
	Krasnokutsk	Bohodukhiv Raion	Kharkiv Oblast	Memorial crosses for the victims of the Holodomor	1991	
	Kyzivka	Bohodukhiv Raion	Kharkiv Oblast	Memorial cross for the victims of the Holodomor	1988	
	Mandrychyne	Bohodukhiv Raion	Kharkiv Oblast	Memorial to the victims of the Holodomor	1993	
	Murafa	Bohodukhiv Raion	Kharkiv Oblast	Memorial cross for the victims of the Holodomor	2004	
	Mynkivka	Bohodukhiv Raion	Kharkiv Oblast	Memorial to the victims of the Holodomor	2008	
	Parkhomivka	Bohodukhiv Raion	Kharkiv Oblast	Memorial cross for the victims of the Holodomor	1997	
	Polkova Mykytivka	Bohodukhiv Raion	Kharkiv Oblast	Memorial cross for the victims of the Holodomor	1992	
	Pysarivka	Bohodukhiv Raion	Kharkiv Oblast	Memorial cross for the victims of the Holodomor	1997	
	Rizunenkove	Bohodukhiv Raion	Kharkiv Oblast	Memorial to the victims of the Holodomor and political repression	1989	
	Riabokonуve	Bohodukhiv Raion	Kharkiv Oblast	Memorial cross for the victims of the Holodomor	1993	
	Sharivka	Bohodukhiv Raion	Kharkiv Oblast	Memorial cross for the victims of the Holodomor	1999	
	Snizhkiv	Bohodukhiv Raion	Kharkiv Oblast	Memorial to the victims of the Holodomor	1990	
	Zolochiv	Bohodukhiv Raion	Kharkiv Oblast	Memorial to the victims of the Holodomor	2005	
	Valky	Bohodukhiv Raion	Kharkiv Oblast	Memorial to the victims of the Holodomor		
	Voskresenivka	Bohodukhiv Raion	Kharkiv Oblast	Memorial cross for the victims of the Holodomor	2007	
	Vysokopillia	Bohodukhiv Raion	Kharkiv Oblast	Memorial cross for the victims of the Holodomor	2007	
	Artemivka	Chuhuiv Raion	Kharkiv Oblast	Memorial cross for the victims of the Holodomor	1996	
	Bazaliivka	Chuhuiv Raion	Kharkiv Oblast	Memorial cross for the victims of the Holodomor		
	Chuhuiiv	Chuhuiv Raion	Kharkiv Oblast	Memorial cross for the victims of the Holodomor	2007	
	Hrakove	Chuhuiv Raion	Kharkiv Oblast	Memorial cross for the victims of the Holodomor		
	Kamiana Yaruha	Chuhuiv Raion	Kharkiv Oblast	Memorial to the victims of the Holodomor		
	Kochetok	Chuhuiv Raion	Kharkiv Oblast	Memorial cross for the victims of the Holodomor		
	Lebiazhe	Chuhuiv Raion	Kharkiv Oblast	Memorial cross for the victims of the Holodomor	2008	
	Mala Vovcha	Chuhuiv Raion	Kharkiv Oblast	Memorial to the victims of the Holodomor	2008	
	Malynivka	Chuhuiv Raion	Kharkiv Oblast	Memorial cross for the victims of the Holodomor	2008	
	Mospanove	Chuhuiv Raion	Kharkiv Oblast	Memorial cross for the victims of the Holodomor	2003	
	Novopokrovka	Chuhuiv Raion	Kharkiv Oblast	Memorial cross for the victims of the Holodomor		
	Zarozhne	Chuhuiv Raion	Kharkiv Oblast	Memorial cross for the victims of the Holodomor		
	Vovchansk	Chuhuiv Raion	Kharkiv Oblast	Memorial cross for the victims of the Holodomor	1991	
	Barvinkove	Izium Raion	Kharkiv Oblast	Memorial cross for the victims of the Holodomor	1993	
	Borshchivka	Izium Raion	Kharkiv Oblast	Memorial to the victims of the Holodomor		
	Cherneshchyna	Izium Raoin	Kharkiv Oblast	Memorial cross for the victims of the Holodomor	1992	
	Izium	Izium Raion	Kharkiv Oblast	Memorial cross for the victims of the Holodomor on Mount Kremenets	2003	
	Shebelynka	Izium Raion	Kharkiv Oblast	Memorial to the victims of the Holodomor	2003	
	Volokhiv Yar	Izium Raion	Kharkiv Oblast	Memorial to the victims of the Holodomor	2006	
	Budy	Kharkiv Raion	Kharkiv Oblast	Memorial cross for the victims of the Holodomor		
	Derhachi	Kharkiv Raion	Kharkiv Oblast	Memorial cross for the victims of the Holodomor	2002	
	Kharkiv	Kharkiv Raion	Kharkiv Oblast	Memorial site for the victims of the Holodomor	2008	
	Kharkiv	Kharkiv Raion	Kharkiv Oblast	Memorial cross for the victims of the Holodomor	1989	
	Korotych	Kharkiv Raion	Kharkiv Oblast	Memorial cross for the victims of the Holodomor		
	Liubotyn	Kharkiv Raion	Kharkiv Oblast	Memorial to the victims of the Holodomor		
	Mala Danylivka	Kharkiv Raion	Kharkiv Oblast	Memorial cross for the victims of the Holodomor		
	Merefa	Kharkiv Raion	Kharkiv Oblast	Memorial cross for the victims of the Holodomor	2008	
	Pokotylivka	Kharkiv Raion	Kharkiv Oblast	Memorial cross for the victims of the Holodomor	2007	
	Cherkaska Lozova	Kharkiv Raion	Kharkiv Oblast	Memorial cross for the victims of the Holodomor		
	Vilshany	Kharkiv Raion	Kharkiv Oblast	Memorial cross for the victims of the Holodomor		
	Dvorichna	Kupiansk Raion	Kharkiv Oblast	Memorial cross for the victims of the Holodomor	1992	
	Kupiansk	Kupiansk Raion	Kharkiv Oblast	Memorial to the victims of the Holodomor	2017	
	Petropavlivka	Kupiansk Raion	Kharkiv Oblast	Memorial cross for the victims of the Holodomor	2007	
	Vasylenkove	Kupiansk Raion	Kharkiv Oblast	Memorial stone for the victims of the Holodomor	2002	
	Velykyi Burluk	Kupiansk Raion	Kharkiv Oblast	Memorial cross for the victims of the Holodomor		
	Blyzniuky	Lozova Raion	Kharkiv Oblast	Memorial chapel for the victims of the Holodomor	2009	
	Lozova	Lozova Raion	Kharkiv Oblast	Memorial to the victims of the Holodomor		
	Oleksiivka	Lozova Raion	Kharkiv Oblast	Memorial cross for the victims of the Holodomor	2003	
	Preobrazhenivka	Lozova Raion	Kharkiv Oblast	Memorial to the victims of the Holodomor	2007	
	Sofiivka Persha	Lozova Raion	Kharkiv Oblast	Memorial cross for the victims of the Holodomor	2008	
	Slobidka	Obukhiv Raion	Kharkiv Oblast	Memorial cross for the victims of the Holodomor	1993	
	Arkhanhelske	Beryslav Raion	Kherson Oblast	Memorial to the victims of the Holodomor	2008	
	Beryslav	Beryslav Raion	Kherson Oblast	Memorial cross for the victims of the Holodomor	2003	
	Dobrianka	Beryslav Raion	Kherson Oblast	Memorial cross for the victims of the Holodomor	2008	
	Dudchany	Beryslav Raion	Kherson Oblast	Memorial cross for the victims of the Holodomor	2007	
	Tiahynka	Beryslav Raion	Kherson Oblast	Memorial to the victims of the Holodomor	2006	
	Zahradivka	Beryslav Raion	Kherson Oblast	Memorial to the victims of the Holodomor	2007	
	Balashove	Henichesk Raion	Kherson Oblast	Memorial to the victims of the Holodomor. It was demolished by Russian occupiers in 2023		
	Henichesk	Henichesk Raion	Kherson Oblast	Memorial to the victims of the Holodomor	2008	
	Novooleksiivka	Henichesk Raion	Kherson Oblast	Memorial to the victims of the Holodomor		
	Novotroitske	Henichesk Raion	Kherson Oblast	Memorial to the victims of the Holodomor	2008	
	Novovasylivka	Henichesk Raion	Kherson Oblast	Memorial to the victims of the Holodomor		
	Trokhymivka	Henichesk Raion	Kherson Oblast	Memorial to the victims of the Holodomor	2008	
	Chaplynka	Kakhovka Raion	Kherson Oblast	Memorial to the victims of the Holodomor		
	Dnipriany	Kakhovka Raion	Kherson Oblast	Memorial cross for the victims of the Holodomor	1993	
	Kosatska Sloboda	Kakhovka Raion	Kherson Oblast	Memorial stone for the victims of the Holodomor	2008	
	Nova Kakhovka	Kakhovka Raion	Kherson Oblast	Memorial to the victims of the Holodomor. The monument was demolished in 2023 following the Russian invasion of Ukraine		
	Velyka Blahowishchenka	Kakhovka Raion	Kherson Oblast	Memorial cross for the victims of the Holodomor	2008	
	Velyka Lepetykha	Kakhovka Raion	Kherson Oblast	Memorial to the victims of the Holodomor		
	Bilozerka	Kherson Raion	Kherson Oblast	Memorial to the victims of the Holodomor	2007	
	Dariivka	Kherson Raion	Kherson Oblast	Memorial cross for the victims of the Holodomor		
	Fedorivka	Kherson Raion	Kherson Oblast	Memorial to the victims of the Holodomor	2008	
	Kherson	Kherson Raion	Kherson Oblast	Memorial site for the victims of the Holodomor	1992	
	Muzykivka	Kherson Raion	Kherson Oblast	Memorial to the victims of the Holodomor		
	Nova Maiachka	Kherson Raion	Kherson Oblast	Memorial to the victims of the Holodomor		
	Posad-Pokrovske	Kherson Raion	Kherson Oblast	Memorial cross for the victims of the Holodomor		
	Tomyna Balka	Kherson Raion	Kherson Oblast	Memorial cross for the victims of the Holodomor	2008	
	Bekhtery	Skadovsk Raion	Kherson Oblast	Memorial to the victims of the Holodomor	1995	
	Dolmativka	Skadovsk Raion	Kherson Oblast	Memorial to the victims of the Holodomor	2008	
	Hola Prystan	Skadovsk Raion	Kherson Oblast	Memorial cross for the victims of the Holodomor		
	Kalanchak	Skadovsk Raion	Kherson Oblast	Memorial to the victims of the Holodomor	2008	
	Novosofiivka	Skadovsk Raion	Kherson Oblast	Memorial to the victims of the Holodomor	2008	
	Mala Kuzhelivka	Dunaivtsi Raion	Khmelnytskyi Oblast	Memorial cross for the victims of the Holodomor		
	Antonivka	Kamianets-Podilskyi Raion	Khmelnytskyi Oblast	Memorial cross for the victims of the Holodomor		
	Balamutivka	Kamianets-Podilskyi Raion	Khmelnytskyi Oblast	Memorial cross for the victims of the Holodomor und der Repressionen		
	Braiilivka	Kamianets-Podilskyi Raion	Khmelnytskyi Oblast	Memorial to the victims of the Holodomor		
	Chankiv	Kamianets-Podilskyi Raion	Khmelnytskyi Oblast	Memorial cross for the victims of the Holodomor		
	Сhechelnyk	Kamianets-Podilskyi Raion	Khmelnytskyi Oblast	Memorial cross for the victims of the Holodomor		
	Chemerivtsi	Kamianets-Podilskyi Raion	Khmelnytskyi Oblast	Memorial to the victims of the Holodomor		
	Dereviane	Kamianets-Podilskyi Raion	Khmelnytskyi Oblast	Memorial cross for the victims of the Holodomor		
	Derzhanivka	Kamianets-Podilskyi Raion	Khmelnytskyi Oblast	Memorial cross for the victims of the Holodomor	2017	
	Dumaniv	Kamianets-Podilskyi Raion	Khmelnytskyi Oblast	Memorial cross for the victims of the Holodomor		
	Kamianets-Podilskyi	Kamianets-Podilskyi Raion	Khmelnytskyi Oblast	Memorial to the victims of the Holodomor		
	Kniazhpil	Kamianets-Podilskyi Raion	Khmelnytskyi Oblast	Memorial cross for the victims of the Holodomor	1995	
	Kolybaivka	Kamianets-Podilskyi Raion	Khmelnytskyi Oblast	Memorial to the victims of the Holodomor	2024	
	Mitsivtsi	Kamianets-Podilskyi Raion	Khmelnytskyi Oblast	Memorial to the victims of the Holodomor		
	Muksha Kytaihorodska	Kamianets-Podilskyi Raion	Khmelnytskyi Oblast	Memorial to the victims of the Holodomor	1990	
	Mynkivtsi	Kamianets-Podilskyi Raion	Khmelnytskyi Oblast	Memorial to the victims of the Holodomor		
	Nefedivtsi	Kamianets-Podilskyi Raion	Khmelnytskyi Oblast	Memorial cross for the victims of the Holodomor		
	Nova Ushytsia	Kamianets-Podilskyi Raion	Khmelnytskyi Oblast	Memorial to the victims of the Holodomor		
	Panivtsi	Kamianets-Podilskyi Raion	Khmelnytskyi Oblast	Memorial cross for the victims of the Holodomor	2008	
	Stavyshche	Kamianets-Podilskyi Raion	Khmelnytskyi Oblast	Memorial cross for the victims of the Holodomor		
	Smotrych	Kamianets-Podilskyi Raion	Khmelnytskyi Oblast	Memorial to the victims of the Holodomor	2008	
	Stara Ushytsia	Kamianets-Podilskyi Raion	Khmelnytskyi Oblast	Memorial cross for the victims of the Holodomor	2008	
	Rudkivtsi	Kamianets-Podilskyi Raion	Khmelnytskyi Oblast	Memorial cross for the victims of the Holodomor		
	Vakhnivtsi	Kamianets-Podilskyi Raion	Khmelnytskyi Oblast	Memorial cross for the victims of the Holodomor	2008	
	Velyka Pobiina	Kamianets-Podilskyi Raion	Khmelnytskyi Oblast	Memorial to the victims of the Holodomor and the repressions		
	Velykozalissia	Kamianets-Podilskyi Raion	Khmelnytskyi Oblast	Memorial cross for the victims of the Holodomor		
	Verbka	Kamianets-Podilskyi Raion	Khmelnytskyi Oblast	Memorial to the victims of the Holodomor and the repressions		
	Adampil	Khmelnytskyi Raion	Khmelnytskyi Oblast	Memorial stone for the victims of the Holodomor		
	Bazalia	Khmelnytskyi Raion	Khmelnytskyi Oblast	Memorial to the victims of the Holodomor		
	Berezhanka	Khmelnytskyi Raion	Khmelnytskyi Oblast	Memorial to the victims of the Holodomor		
	Bokyivka	Khmelnytskyi Raion	Khmelnytskyi Oblast	Memorial to the victims of the Holodomor		
	Borshchivka, Horodok	Khmelnytskyi Raion	Khmelnytskyi Oblast	Memorial cross for the victims of the Holodomor		
	Davydkivtsi	Khmelnytskyi Raion	Khmelnytskyi Oblast	Memorial to the victims of the Holodomor		
	Haidaiky	Khmelnytskyi Raion	Khmelnytskyi Oblast	Memorial cross for the victims of the Holodomor		
	Horodok	Khmelnytskyi Raion	Khmelnytskyi Oblast	Memorial to the victims of the Holodomor	1995	
	Hrechana	Khmelnytskyi Raion	Khmelnytskyi Oblast	Memorial to the victims of the Holodomor		
	Hvardiiske	Khmelnytskyi Raion	Khmelnytskyi Oblast	Memorial cross for the victims of the Holodomor		
	Irshyky	Khmelnytskyi Raion	Khmelnytskyi Oblast	Memorial cross for the victims of the Holodomor	2008	
	Ivanivka, Volochysk urban hromada	Khmelnytskyi Raion	Khmelnytskyi Oblast	Memorial cross for the victims of the Holodomor and political repressions		
	Kadyiivka	Khmelnytskyi Raion	Khmelnytskyi Oblast	Memorial to the victims of the Holodomor		
	Kosohirka	Khmelnytskyi Raion	Khmelnytskyi Oblast	Memorial to the victims of the Holodomor		
	Khmelnytskyi	Khmelnytskyi Raion	Khmelnytskyi Oblast	Memorial to the victims of the Holodomor	1998	
	Kholodets	Khmelnytskyi Raion	Khmelnytskyi Oblast	Memorial cross for the victims of the Holodomor	2007	
	Krasyliv	Khmelnytskyi Raion	Khmelnytskyi Oblast	Memorial to the victims of the Holodomor		
	Kupil	Khmelnytskyi Raion	Khmelnytskyi Oblast	Memorial cross for the victims of the Holodomor	2007	
	Kurylivka	Khmelnytskyi Raion	Khmelnytskyi Oblast	Memorial to the victims of the Holodomor and political repression		
	Kuzhnirivka	Khmelnytskyi Raion	Khmelnytskyi Oblast	Memorial to the victims of the Holodomor		
	Kuzhnirivska Slobidka	Khmelnytskyi Raion	Khmelnytskyi Oblast	Memorial to the victims of the Holodomor		
	Luhove	Khmelnytskyi Raion	Khmelnytskyi Oblast	Memorial to the victims of the Holodomor		
	Lychivka	Khmelnytskyi Raion	Khmelnytskyi Oblast	Memorial to the victims of the Holodomor		
	Malynychi	Khmelnytskyi Raion	Khmelnytskyi Oblast	Memorial to the victims of the Holodomor	2008	
	Masivtsi	Khmelnytskyi Raion	Khmelnytskyi Oblast	Memorial to the victims of the Holodomor		
	Matskivtsi	Khmelnytskyi Raion	Khmelnytskyi Oblast	Memorial to the victims of the Holodomor	2003	
	Mshanets	Khmelnytskyi Raion	Khmelnytskyi Oblast	Memorial to the victims of the Holodomor		
	Monastyrok	Khmelnytskyi Raion	Khmelnytskyi Oblast	Memorial to the victims of the Holodomor		
	Nemyryntsi	Khmelnytskyi Raion	Khmelnytskyi Oblast	Memorial cross for the victims of the Holodomor		
	Nove Selo	Khmelnytskyi Raion	Khmelnytskyi Oblast	Memorial to the victims of the Holodomor		
	Novosilka	Khmelnytskyi Raion	Khmelnytskyi Oblast	Memorial cross for the victims of the Holodomor		
	Novyi Svit	Khmelnytskyi Raion	Khmelnytskyi Oblast	Memorial cross for the victims of the Holodomor	2008	
	Oleksiivka	Khmelnytskyi Raion	Khmelnytskyi Oblast	Memorial cross for the victims of the Holodomor		
	Ostashky	Khmelnytskyi Raion	Khmelnytskyi Oblast	Memorial to the victims of the Holodomor		
	Ozharivka	Khmelnytskyi Raion	Khmelnytskyi Oblast	Memorial cross for the victims of the Holodomor	1989	
	Ozhyhivtsi	Khmelnytskyi Raion	Khmelnytskyi Oblast	Memorial to the victims of political repression and the Holodomor		
	Pakhutyntsi	Khmelnytskyi Raion	Khmelnytskyi Oblast	Memorial cross for the victims of the Holodomor	2003	
	Pasichna	Khmelnytskyi Raion	Khmelnytskyi Oblast	Memorial to the victims of the Holodomor		
	Pilnyi Oleksynets	Khmelnytskyi Raion	Khmelnytskyi Oblast	Memorial to the victims of the Holodomor		
	Poliany	Khmelnytskyi Raion	Khmelnytskyi Oblast	Memorial to the victims of the Holodomor		
	Pravdivka	Khmelnytskyi Raion	Khmelnytskyi Oblast	Memorial to the victims of the Holodomor		
	Pysarivka, Viitivtsi	Khmelnytskyi Raion	Khmelnytskyi Oblast	Memorial to the victims of the Holodomor		
	Pyshky	Khmelnytskyi Raion	Khmelnytskyi Oblast	Memorial cross for the victims of the Holodomor	2003	
	Ridkoduby	Khmelnytskyi Raion	Khmelnytskyi Oblast	Memorial to the victims of the Holodomor		
	Ripna	Khmelnytskyi Raion	Khmelnytskyi Oblast	Memorial to the victims of the Holodomor		
	Samchyntsi	Khmelnytskyi Raion	Khmelnytskyi Oblast	Memorial cross for the victims of the Holodomor	1994	
	Zaichyky	Khmelnytskyi Raion	Khmelnytskyi Oblast	Memorial cross for the victims of the Holodomor		
	Yakhnivtsi	Khmelnytskyi Raion	Khmelnytskyi Oblast	Memorial to the victims of the Holodomor and political repression		
	Yarmolynzi	Khmelnytskyi Raion	Khmelnytskyi Oblast	Memorial to the victims of the Holodomor	2008	
	Zavaliiky	Khmelnytskyi Raion	Khmelnytskyi Oblast	Memorial to the victims of the Holodomor	2008	
	Zhabche	Khmelnytskyi Raion	Khmelnytskyi Oblast	Memorial cross for the victims of the Holodomor	2001	
	Sharovechka	Khmelnytskyi Raion	Khmelnytskyi Oblast	Memorial cross for the victims of the Holodomor and repressions	2004	
	Shchasnivka	Khmelnytskyi Raion	Khmelnytskyi Oblast	Memorial cross for the victims of the Holodomor and political repressions		
	Shmyrky	Khmelnytskyi Raion	Khmelnytskyi Oblast	Memorial to the victims of the Holodomor		
	Zhuchkivtsi	Khmelnytskyi Raion	Khmelnytskyi Oblast	Memorial cross for the victims of the Holodomor		
	Zelena	Khmelnytskyi Raion	Khmelnytskyi Oblast	Memorial cross for the victims of the Holodomor and political repressions		
	Zinkiv	Khmelnytskyi Raion	Khmelnytskyi Oblast	Memorial cross for the victims of the Holodomor and political repressions		
	Stara Pisochna	Khmelnytskyi Raion	Khmelnytskyi Oblast	Memorial cross for the victims of the Holodomor		
	Stara Syniava	Khmelnytskyi Raion	Khmelnytskyi Oblast	Memorial cross for the victims of the Holodomor		
	Starokostiantyniv	Khmelnytskyi Raion	Khmelnytskyi Oblast	Memorial to the victims of the Holodomor	2008	
	Starokostiantyniv	Khmelnytskyi Raion	Khmelnytskyi Oblast	Memorial to the victims of the Holodomor on Ivan Franko Square		
	Sutkivtsi	Khmelnytskyi Raion	Khmelnytskyi Oblast	Memorial to the victims of the Holodomor		
	Sviatets	Khmelnytskyi Raion	Khmelnytskyi Oblast	Memorial cross for the victims of the Holodomor		
	Trostianets	Khmelnytskyi Raion	Khmelnytskyi Oblast	Memorial cross for the victims of the Holodomor		
	Viitivtsi	Khmelnytskyi Raion	Khmelnytskyi Oblast	Memorial cross for the victims of the Holodomor	2008	
	Vodychky	Khmelnytskyi Raion	Khmelnytskyi Oblast	Memorial to the victims of the Holodomor	2008	
	Volochysk	Khmelnytskyi Raion	Khmelnytskyi Oblast	Memorial cross for the victims of the Holodomor	1993	
	Voronivtsi	Khmelnytskyi Raion	Khmelnytskyi Oblast	Memorial cross for the victims of the Holodomor	2008	
	Vochkivtsi	Khmelnytskyi Raion	Khmelnytskyi Oblast	Memorial to the victims of the Holodomor	2007	
	Vovkovyntsi	Khmelnytskyi Raion	Khmelnytskyi Oblast	Memorial cross for the victims of the Holodomor		
	Vydava	Khmelnytskyi Raion	Khmelnytskyi Oblast	Memorial to the victims of the Holodomor		
	Tsymbalivka	Khmelnytskyi Raion	Khmelnytskyi Oblast	Memorial stone for the victims of the Holodomor		
	Struha	Podilskyi Raion	Khmelnytskyi Oblast	Memorial to the victims of the Holodomor	2008	
	Bilohirja	Shepetivka Raion	Khmelnytskyi Oblast	Memorial chapel for the victims of the Holodomor	1993	
	Didkivtsi	Shepetivka Raion	Khmelnytskyi Oblast	Memorial cross for the victims of the Holodomor		
	Iziaslav	Shepetivka Raion	Khmelnytskyi Oblast	Memorial to the victims of the Holodomor	2008	
	Khutir	Shepetivka Raion	Khmelnytskyi Oblast	Memorial to the victims of the Holodomor	2010	
	Komarivka	Shepetivka Raion	Khmelnytskyi Oblast	Memorial to the victims of the Holodomor		
	Maniatyn	Shepetivka Raion	Khmelnytskyi Oblast	Memorial cross for the victims of the Holodomor	2008	
	Netishyn	Shepetivka Raion	Khmelnytskyi Oblast	Memorial to the victims of the Holodomor		
	Plesna	Shepetivka Raion	Khmelnytskyi Oblast	Memorial to the victims of the Holodomor	2008	
	Polonne	Shepetivka Raion	Khmelnytskyi Oblast	Memorial to the victims of the Holodomor	2006	
	Ponora	Shepetivka Raion	Khmelnytskyi Oblast	Memorial cross for the victims of the Holodomor	2008	
	Rivky	Shepetivka Raion	Khmelnytskyi Oblast	Memorial cross for the victims of the Holodomor	2008	
	Slavuta	Shepetivka Raion	Khmelnytskyi Oblast	Memorial to the victims of the Holodomor	1994	
	Stryhany	Shepetivka Raion	Khmelnytskyi Oblast	Memorial cross for the victims of the Holodomor		
	Traulyn	Shepetivka Raion	Khmelnytskyi Oblast	Memorial to the victims of the Holodomor		
	Vaskivtsi	Shepetivka Raion	Khmelnytskyi Oblast	Memorial to the victims of the Holodomor	1995	
	Bovtyshka	Kropyvnytskyi Raion	Kirovohrad Oblast	Memorial cross for the victims of the Holodomor		
	Holovanivsk	Holovanivsk Raion	Kirovohrad Oblast	Memorial cross for the victims of the Holodomor		
	Hruske	Holovanivsk Raion	Kirovohrad Oblast	Memorial stone for the victims of the Holodomor		
	Kutsa Balka	Holovanivsk Raion	Kirovohrad Oblast	Commemorative plaque for the victims of the Holodomor		
	Mala Vilshanka	Holovanivsk Raion	Kirovohrad Oblast	Memorial cross for the victims of the Holodomor		
	Solomia	Holovanivsk Raion	Kirovohrad Oblast	Memorial to the victims of the Holodomor		
	Svirneve	Holovanivsk Raion	Kirovohrad Oblast	Memorial to the victims of the Holodomor		
	Krasnosilka	Kropyvnytskyi Raion	Kirovohrad Oblast	Memorial cross to the victims of the Holodomor		
	Kropyvnytskyi	Kropyvnytskyi Raion	Kirovohrad Oblast	Memorial to the victims of the Holodomor	2016	
	Znamianka	Kropyvnytskyi Raion	Kirovohrad Oblast	Commemorative plaque for the victims of the Holodomor		
	Vershyno-Kamianka	Kropyvnytskyi Raion	Kirovohrad Oblast	Memorial cross for the victims of the Holodomor		
	Dobrovelychkivka	Novoukrainka Raion	Kirovohrad Oblast	Memorial to the victims of the Holodomor		
	Kropyvnytske	Novoukrainka Raion	Kirovohrad Oblast	Memorial cross for the victims of the Holodomor	2008	
	Novoukraiinka	Novoukrainka Raion	Kirovohrad Oblast	Memorial to the victims of the Holodomor	2003	
	Novoukraiinka	Novoukrainka Raion	Kirovohrad Oblast	Memorial stone for the victims of the Holodomor at the cemetery	1990	
	Mlynok	Oleksandriia Raion	Kirovohrad Oblast	Memorial to the victims of the Holodomor		
	Velyka Skeliova	Oleksandriia Raion	Kirovohrad Oblast	Memorial to the victims of the Holodomor		
	Bakaly	Bila Tserkva Raion	Kyiv Oblast	Memorial cross for the victims of the Holodomor	1998	
	Besidka	Bila Tserkva Raion	Kyiv Oblast	Memorial cross for the victims of the Holodomor		
	Bila Tserkva	Bila Tserkva Raion	Kyiv Oblast	Memorial to the victims of the Holodomor	1993	
	Burkivtsi	Bila Tserkva Raion	Kyiv Oblast	Memorial to the victims of the Holodomor		
	Bykova Hreblia	Bila Tserkva Raion	Kyiv Oblast	Memorial cross for the victims of the Holodomor	1993	
	Cherepyn	Bila Tserkva Raion	Kyiv Oblast	Memorial cross for the victims of the Holodomor		
	Chervone	Bila Tserkva Raion	Kyiv Oblast	Memorial cross for the victims of the Holodomor		
	Chupyra	Bila Tserkva Raion	Kyiv Oblast	Memorial cross for the victims of the Holodomor	1993	
	Denykhivka	Bila Tserkva Raion	Kyiv Oblast	Memorial cross for the victims of the Holodomor		
	Dzveniache	Bila Tserkva Raion	Kyiv Oblast	Memorial cross for the victims of the Holodomor		
	Fastivka	Bila Tserkva Raion	Kyiv Oblast	Memorial cross for the victims of the Holodomor	1993	
	Fursy	Bila Tserkva Raion	Kyiv Oblast	Memorial to the victims of the Holodomor	2001	
	Halaiky	Bila Tserkva Raion	Kyiv Oblast	Memorial to the victims of the Holodomor		
	Hlushky	Bila Tserkva Raion	Kyiv Oblast	Memorial to the victims of the Holodomor	1993	
	Hrebinky	Bila Tserkva Raion	Kyiv Oblast	Memorial cross for the victims of the Holodomor	2008	
	Khmelivka	Bila Tserkva Raion	Kyiv Oblast	Memorial to the victims of the Holodomor		
	Khrapachi	Bila Tserkva Raion	Kyiv Oblast	Memorial cross for the victims of the Holodomor	1991	
	Kliuky	Bila Tserkva Raion	Kyiv Oblast	Memorial cross for the victims of the Holodomor		
	Kosivka	Bila Tserkva Raion	Kyiv Oblast	Memorial to the victims of the Holodomor	1993	
	Kovalivka	Bila Tserkva Raion	Kyiv Oblast	Memorial to the victims of the Holodomor		
	Krasne	Bila Tserkva Raion	Kyiv Oblast	Memorial cross for the victims of the Holodomor	1997	
	Krasylivka	Bila Tserkva Raion	Kyiv Oblast	Memorial to the victims of the Holodomor		
	Kyshchyntsi	Bila Tserkva Raion	Kyiv Oblast	Memorial cross for the victims of the Holodomor		
	Lohvyn	Bila Tserkva Raion	Kyiv Oblast	Memorial to the victims of the Holodomor	1990	
	Makiivka	Bila Tserkva Raion	Kyiv Oblast	Memorial cross for the victims of the Holodomor	1994	
	Mala Skvyrka	Bila Tserkva Raion	Kyiv Oblast	Memorial cross for the victims of the Holodomor	1993	
	Mala Vilshanka	Bila Tserkva Raion	Kyiv Oblast	Memorial cross for the victims of the Holodomor	1998	
	Marmuliivka	Bila Tserkva Raion	Kyiv Oblast	Memorial to the victims of the Holodomor		
	Mazepyntsi	Bila Tserkva Raion	Kyiv Oblast	Memorial to the victims of the Holodomor	2002	
	Nenadykha	Bila Tserkva Raion	Kyiv Oblast	Memorial cross for the victims of the Holodomor		
	Orikhovets	Bila Tserkva Raion	Kyiv Oblast	Memorial to the victims of the Holodomor	1994	
	Palianychyntsi	Bila Tserkva Raion	Kyiv Oblast	Memorial to the victims of the Holodomor		
	Parkhomivka	Bila Tserkva Raion	Kyiv Oblast	Memorial to the victims of the Holodomor	1992	
	Piatyhory	Bila Tserkva Raion	Kyiv Oblast	Memorial cross for the victims of the Holodomor		
	Pishchana	Bila Tserkva Raion	Kyiv Oblast	Memorial to the victims of the Holodomor	1994	
	Polkovnyche	Bila Tserkva Raion	Kyiv Oblast	Memorial cross for the victims of the Holodomor		
	Potiivka	Bila Tserkva Raion	Kyiv Oblast	Memorial to the victims of the Holodomor	1990	
	Pylypcha	Bila Tserkva Raion	Kyiv Oblast	Memorial cross for the victims of the Holodomor	1997	
	Rachky	Bila Tserkva Raion	Kyiv Oblast	Memorial cross for the victims of the Holodomor		
	Rokytne	Bila Tserkva Raion	Kyiv Oblast	Memorial to the victims of the Holodomor		
	Rozkishna	Bila Tserkva Raion	Kyiv Oblast	Memorial cross for the victims of the Holodomor		
	Rubchenky	Bila Tserkva Raion	Kyiv Oblast	Memorial to the victims of the Holodomor	1993	
	Rude Selo	Bila Tserkva Raion	Kyiv Oblast	Memorial to the victims of the Holodomor	1992	
	Shkarivka	Bila Tserkva Raion	Kyiv Oblast	Memorial to the victims of the Holodomor	1993	
	Skrebyshi	Bila Tserkva Raion	Kyiv Oblast	Memorial cross for the victims of the Holodomor	1991	
	Sokolivka	Bila Tserkva Raion	Kyiv Oblast	Memorial to the victims of the Holodomor	1993	
	Stadnytsia	Bila Tserkva Raion	Kyiv Oblast	Memorial to the victims of the Holodomor		
	Stavyshche	Bila Tserkva Raion	Kyiv Oblast	Memorial to the victims of the Holodomor		
	Stepove	Bila Tserkva Raion	Kyiv Oblast	Memorial to the victims of the Holodomor		
	Tarhan	Bila Tserkva Raion	Kyiv Oblast	Memorial to the victims of the Holodomor	1988	
	Telizhyntsi	Bila Tserkva Raion	Kyiv Oblast	Memorial cross for the victims of the Holodomor		
	Terezyne	Bila Tserkva Raion	Kyiv Oblast	Memorial cross for the victims of the Holodomor	1988	
	Tetiiv	Bila Tserkva Raion	Kyiv Oblast	Memorial to the victims of the Holodomor		
	Tomylivka	Bila Tserkva Raion	Kyiv Oblast	Memorial to the victims of the Holodomor	1990	
	Torchytsia	Bila Tserkva Raion	Kyiv Oblast	Memorial to the victims of the Holodomor		
	Trushky	Bila Tserkva Raion	Kyiv Oblast	Memorial cross for the victims of the Holodomor	1993	
	Uzyn	Bila Tserkva Raion	Kyiv Oblast	Memorial cross for the victims of the Holodomor	1993	
	Velyka Skeliova	Oleksandriia Raion	Kirovohrad Oblast	Memorial cross for the victims of the Holodomor		
	Velyka Vyska	Novoukrainka Raion	Kirovohrad Oblast	Memorial to the victims of the Holodomor	2024	
	Volodarka	Bila Tserkva Raion	Kyiv Oblast	Memorial to the victims of the Holodomor	1990	
	Vynarivka	Bila Tserkva Raion	Kyiv Oblast	Memorial cross for the victims of the Holodomor		
	Vysoke	Bila Tserkva Raion	Kyiv Oblast	Memorial to the victims of the Holodomor		
	Zavadivka	Bila Tserkva Raion	Kyiv Oblast	Memorial to the victims of the Holodomor	1993	
	Zhytni Hory	Bila Tserkva Raion	Kyiv Oblast	Memorial to the victims of the Holodomor		
	Yablunivka	Bila Tserkva Raion	Kyiv Oblast	Memorial to the victims of the Holodomor		
	Yasenivka	Bila Tserkva Raion	Kyiv Oblast	Memorial cross for the victims of the Holodomor		
	Yosypivka	Bila Tserkva Raion	Kyiv Oblast	Memorial cross for the victims of the Holodomor	2001	
	Yurkivka	Bila Tserkva Raion	Kyiv Oblast	Memorial cross for the victims of the Holodomor		
	Boryspil	Boryspil Raion	Kyiv Oblast	Memorial to the victims of the Holodomor	2011	
	Bezuhlivka	Boryspil Raion	Kyiv Oblast	Memorial to the victims of the Holodomor and political repression		
	Bohdanivka	Boryspil Raion	Kyiv Oblast	Memorial cross for the victims of the Holodomor	1993	
	Hnidyn	Boryspil Raion	Kyiv Oblast	Memorial cross for the victims of the Holodomor		
	Hora	Boryspil Raion	Kyiv Oblast	Memorial to the victims of the Holodomor	2008	
	Ivankiv	Boryspil Raion	Kyiv Oblast	Memorial chapel for the victims of the Holodomor		
	Kapustyntsi	Boryspil Raion	Kyiv Oblast	Memorial to the victims of the Holodomor		
	Berezan	Brovary Raion	Kyiv Oblast	Memorial to the victims of the Holodomor	1993	
	Brovary	Brovary Raion	Kyiv Oblast	Memorial cross for the victims of the Holodomor	2008	
	Brovary	Brovary Raion	Kyiv Oblast	Memorial to the victims of the Holodomor	2008	
	Hostroluchchia	Brovary Raion	Kyiv Oblast	Memorial cross for the victims of the Holodomor		
	Korniivka	Brovary Raion	Kyiv Oblast	Memorial cross for the victims of the Holodomor	2007	
	Kalynivka	Brovary Raion	Kyiv Oblast	Memorial cross for the victims of the Holodomor		
	Litky	Brovary Raion	Kyiv Oblast	Memorial to the victims of the Holodomor		
	Ozershchyna	Borodianka Raion	Kyiv Oblast	Memorial cross for the victims of the Holodomor	1994	
	Pereiaslav	Boryspil Raion	Kyiv Oblast	Memorial cross for the victims of the Holodomor		
	Sosnova	Boryspil Raion	Kyiv Oblast	Memorial cross for the victims of the Holodomor		
	Rudnia	Brovary Raion	Kyiv Oblast	Memorial cross for the victims of the Holodomor		
	Selyshche	Brovary Raion	Kyiv Oblast	Memorial cross for the victims of the Holodomor		
	Svynoiidy	Brovary Raion	Kyiv Oblast	Memorial cross for the victims of the Holodomor	2008	
	Zazymia	Brovary Raion	Kyiv Oblast	Memorial to the victims of the Holodomor		
	Velykyi Krupil	Brovary Raion	Kyiv Oblast	Memorial to the victims of the Holodomor		
	Vyshneve	Brovary Raion	Kyiv Oblast	Memorial cross for the victims of the Holodomor		
	Zasupoivka	Boryspil Raion	Kyiv Oblast	Memorial cross for the victims of the Holodomor	1993	
	Vypovzky	Boryspil Raion	Kyiv Oblast	Memorial to the victims of the Holodomor	2000	
	Andriivka	Bucha Raion	Kyiv Oblast	Memorial to the victims of the Holodomor. Damaged during the Russian occupation in 2022	2006	
	Borivka	Bucha Raion	Kyiv Oblast	Memorial to the victims of the Holodomor		
	Borodianka	Bucha Raion	Kyiv Oblast	Memorial cross for the victims of the Holodomor	1990	
	Borodianka	Bucha Raion	Kyiv Oblast	Memorial to the victims of the Holodomor	2008	
	Druzhnia	Bucha Raion	Kyiv Oblast	Memorial cross for the victims of the Holodomor	2003	
	Havronshchyna	Bucha Raion	Kyiv Oblast	Memorial to the victims of the Holodomor		
	Havrylivka	Bucha Raion	Kyiv Oblast	Memorial cross for the victims of the Holodomor		
	Fasova	Bucha Raion	Kyiv Oblast	Memorial cross for the victims of the Holodomor		
	Liudvynivka	Bucha Raion	Kyiv Oblast	Memorial to the victims of the Holodomor		
	Makariv	Bucha Raion	Kyiv Oblast	Memorial to the victims of the Holodomor		
	Muzychi	Bucha Raion	Kyiv Oblast	Memorial to the victims of the Holodomor		
	Velykyi Karashyn	Bucha Raion	Kyiv Oblast	Memorial to the victims of the Holodomor		
	Boiarka	Fastiv Raion	Kyiv Oblast	Memorial stone for the victims of the Holodomor, repressions and Chernobyl disaster	2004	
	Borova	Fastiv Raion	Kyiv Oblast	Memorial to the victims of the Holodomor	2003	
	Danylivka	Fastiv Raion	Kyiv Oblast	Memorial to the victims of the Holodomor	1995	
	Fastivets	Fastiv Raion	Kyiv Oblast	Memorial to the victims of the Holodomor		
	Hruzke	Fastiv Raion	Kyiv Oblast	Memorial cross for the victims of the Holodomor		
	Klekhivka	Fastiv Raion	Kyiv Oblast	Monument to the victims of the Holodomor	2001	
	Olenivka	Fastiv Raion	Kyiv Oblast	Memorial to the victims of the Holodomor	1998	
	Pereviz	Fastiv Raion	Kyiv Oblast	Memorial to the victims of the Holodomor		
	Plesetske	Fastiv Raion	Kyiv Oblast	Memorial cross for the victims of the Holodomor	1993	
	Tarasivka	Fastiv Raion	Kyiv Oblast	Memorial cross for the victims of the Holodomor	1993	
	Velyka Motyvylivka	Fastiv Raion	Kyiv Oblast	Memorial stone for the victims of the Holodomor		
	Vepryk	Fastiv Raion	Kyiv Oblast	Memorial cross for the victims of the Holodomor	1999	
	Volytsia	Fastiv Raion	Kyiv Oblast	Memorial cross for the victims of the Holodomor	1999	
	Zabiria	Fastiv Raion	Kyiv Oblast	Memorial to the victims of the Holodomor		
	Balyko-Schtschutschynka	Obukhiv Raion	Kyiv Oblast	Memorial cross for the victims of the Holodomor	1993	
	Barakhty	Obukhiv Raion	Kyiv Oblast	Memorial to the victims of the Holodomor		
	Burty	Obukhiv Raion	Kyiv Oblast	Memorial to the victims of the Holodomor	1991	
	Cherniakhiv	Obukhiv Raion	Kyiv Oblast	Memorial to the victims of the Holodomor		
	Cherniakhiv	Obukhiv Raion	Kyiv Oblast	Memorial to the victims of the Holodomor	1992	
	Horokhove	Obukhiv Raion	Kyiv Oblast	Memorial to the victims of the Holodomor		
	Kaharlyk	Obukhiv Raion	Kyiv Oblast	Memorial cross for the victims of the Holodomor	1993	
	Karapyshi	Obukhiv Raion	Kyiv Oblast	Memorial cross for the victims of the Holodomor	2000	
	Kosyn	Obukhiv Raion	Kyiv Oblast	Memorial cross for the victims of the Holodomor	2007	
	Leonivka	Obukhiv Raion	Kyiv Oblast	Memorial cross for the victims of the Holodomor	1993	
	Lypovets	Obukhiv Raion	Kyiv Oblast	Memorial cross for the victims of the Holodomor	1993	
	Myrivka	Obukhiv Raion	Kyiv Oblast	Memorial to the victims of the Holodomor	2018	
	Myronivka	Obukhiv Raion	Kyiv Oblast	Memorial to the victims of the Holodomor		
	Obukhiv	Obukhiv Raion	Kyiv Oblast	Memorial to the victims of the Holodomor	2008	
	Pustovity	Obukhiv Raion	Kyiv Oblast	Memorial to the victims of the Holodomor	1989	
	Putrivka	Obukhiv Raion	Kyiv Oblast	Memorial cross for the victims of the Holodomor	2008	
	Shpendivka	Obukhiv Raion	Kyiv Oblast	Memorial cross for the victims of the Holodomor	2000	
	Sloboda	Obukhiv Raion	Kyiv Oblast	Memorial cross for the victims of the Holodomor		
	Staiky	Obukhiv Raion	Kyiv Oblast	Memorial to the victims of the Holodomor	2008	
	Stritivka	Obukhiv Raion	Kyiv Oblast	Memorial cross for the victims of the Holodomor		
	Vasylkiv	Obukhiv Raion	Kyiv Oblast	Memorial to the victims of the Holodomor	1993	
	Velyki Dmytrovychi	Obukhiv Raion	Kyiv Oblast	Memorial to the victims of the Holodomor	1993	
	Velyki Pritsky	Obukhiv Raion	Kyiv Oblast	Memorial cross for the victims of the Holodomor		
	Vytachiv	Obukhiv Raion	Kyiv Oblast	Memorial cross for the victims of the Holodomor		
	Yakhny	Obukhiv Raion	Kyiv Oblast	Memorial to the victims of the Holodomor	2016	
	Bilytchi	Kyiv	Kyiv Oblast	Memorial cross for the victims of the Holodomor		
	Kyiv	Kyiv	Kyiv Oblast	Memorial to the victims of the Holodomor	1993	
	Kyiv	Kyiv	Kyiv Oblast	Memorial site	2008	
	Kyiv	Kyiv	Kyiv Oblast	Memorial cross for the victims of the Holodomor 1932–1933 from the village Bratska Borshchahivka		
	Kyiv	Kyiv	Kyiv Oblast	Memorial cross for the victims of the Holodomor 1932–1933 im Darnytsia Raion		
	Nebelytsia	Makariv Raion	Kyiv Oblast	Memorial to the victims of the Holodomor		
	Ivankiv	Vyshhorod Raion	Kyiv Oblast	Memorial cross for the victims of the Holodomor		
	Kalynove	Vyshhorod Raion	Kyiv Oblast	Memorial to the victims of the Holodomor	1993	
	Liutizh	Vyshhorod Raion	Kyiv Oblast	Memorial to the victims of the Holodomor		
	Novi Petrivtsi	Vyshhorod Raion	Kyiv Oblast	Memorial to the victims of the Holodomor		
	Shpyli	Vyshhorod Raion	Kyiv Oblast	Memorial to the victims of the Holodomor	1993	
	Voropaiiv	Vyshhorod Raion	Kyiv Oblast	Memorial to the victims of the Holodomor		
	Vyshhorod	Vyshhorod Raion	Kyiv Oblast	Memorial to the victims of the Holodomor	2008	
	Raikivshchyna	Yahotyn Raion	Kyiv Oblast	Memorial to the victims of the Holodomor		
	Aidar	Starobilsk Raion	Luhansk Oblast	Memorial cross for the victims of the Holodomor		
	Altchevsk	Alchevsk Raion	Luhansk Oblast	Memorial stone for the victims of the Holodomor	2008	
	Arapivka	Svatove Raion	Luhansk Oblast	Memorial to the victims of the Holodomor		
	Bahachka	Svatove Raion	Luhansk Oblast	Memorial cross for the victims of the Holodomor	2007	
	Balka Zhuravka	Svatove Raion	Luhansk Oblast	Memorial cross for the victims of the Holodomor		
	Bilokurakyne	Svatove Raion	Luhansk Oblast	Memorial cross for the victims of the Holodomor		
	Bilolutsk	Starobilsk Raion	Luhansk Oblast	Memorial cross for the victims of the Holodomor	2008	
	Demyno-Oleksandrivka	Svatove Raion	Luhansk Oblast	Memorial to the victims of the Holodomor	2007	
	Heorhiivka	Synelnykove Raion	Luhansk Oblast	Memorial stone for the victims of the Holodomor	2008	
	Husiivka	Sievierodonetsk Raion	Luhansk Oblast	Memorial cross for the victims of the Holodomor		
	Yepyfanivka	Sievierodonetsk Raion	Luhansk Oblast	Memorial cross for the victims of the Holodomor		
	Kamianka	Starobilsk Raion	Luhansk Oblast	Memorial cross for the victims of the Holodomor	2008	
	Konoplianivka	Svatove Raion	Luhansk Oblast	Memorial cross for the victims of the Holodomor	2008	
	Klymivka	Svatove Raion	Luhansk Oblast	Memorial cross for the victims of the Holodomor		
	Krasnorichenske	Svatove Raion	Luhansk Oblast	Memorial cross for the victims of the Holodomor		
	Kreminna	Sievierodonetsk Raion	Luhansk Oblast	Memorial cross for the victims of the Holodomor	2005	
	Lantrativka	Okhtyrka Raion	Luhansk Oblast	Memorial to the victims of the Holodomor		
	Luhansk	Luhansk Raion	Luhansk Oblast	Memorial to the victims of the Holodomor. The monument was demolished in 2024 following the Russian invasion of Ukraine	2008	
	Lutuhyne	Luhansk Raion	Luhansk Oblast	Memorial stone for the victims of the Holodomor	2007	
	Lysychansk	Sievierodonetsk Raion	Luhansk Oblast	Memorial to the victims of the Holodomor	1990	
	Metalist	Luhansk Raion	Luhansk Oblast	Memorial cross for the victims of the Holodomor	2008	
	Mychailivka	Sievierodonetsk Raion	Luhansk Oblast	Memorial cross for the victims of the Holodomor	2008	
	Novoaidar	Shchastia Raion	Luhansk Oblast	Memorial to the victims of the Holodomor	1993	
	Novomykilske	Svatove Raion	Luhansk Oblast	Memorial cross for the victims of the Holodomor		
	Novoznamianka	Svatove Raion	Luhansk Oblast	Memorial to the victims of the Holodomor	2007	
	Popasna	Sievierodonetsk Raion	Luhansk Oblast	Memorial to the victims of the Holodomor		
	Raihorodka	Svatove Raion	Luhansk Oblast	Monument to Ivan Kravchenko, murdered during the collectivisation		
	Rohove	Starobilsk Raion	Luhansk Oblast	Memorial cross for the victims of the Holodomor. Destroyed in 2025 by the Russian occupiers		
	Zaaidarivka	Starobilsk Raion	Luhansk Oblast	Memorial cross for the victims of the Holodomor		
	Samsonivka	Luhansk Raion	Luhansk Oblast	Memorial cross for the victims of the Holodomor	2008	
	Sievierodonets	Sievierodonetsk Raion	Luhansk Oblast	Memorial chapel for the victims of the Holodomor	2008	
	Kadiivka	Alchevsk Raion	Luhansk Oblast	Memorial cross for the victims of the Holodomor	2008	
	Starobilsk	Starobilsk Raion	Luhansk Oblast	Memorial cross for the victims of the Holodomor		
	Svatove	Starobilsk Raion	Luhansk Oblast	Memorial to the victims of the Holodomor	2007	
	Ternivka	Starobilsk Raion	Luhansk Oblast	Memorial cross for the victims of the Holodomor	2008	
	Varvariwka	Sievierodonetsk Raion	Luhansk Oblast	Memorial cross for the victims of the Holodomor		
	Velyka Chernihivka	Shchastia Raion	Luhansk Oblast	Memorial to the victims of the Holodomor	2008	
	Velykyi Sukhodil	Dovzhansk Raion	Luhansk Oblast	Memorial cross for the victims of the Holodomor	2008	
	Vrubivskyi	Luhansk Raion	Luhansk Oblast	Memorial stone for the victims of the Holodomor	2008	
	Lviv	Lviv Raion	Lviv Oblast	Memorial to the victims of the Holodomor and deportations	2007	
	Sambir	Sambir Raion	Lviv Oblast	Memorial to the victims of the Holodomor		
	Zhovkva	Lviv Raion	Lviv Oblast	Memorial to the victims of the Holodomor		
	Adamivka	Pervomaisk Raion	Mykolaiv Oblast	Memorial to the victims of the Holodomor	2008	
	Bashtanka	Bashtanka Raion	Mykolaiv Oblast	Memorial to the victims of the Holodomor	2008	
	Berezanka	Mykolaiv Raion	Mykolaiv Oblast	Memorial to the victims of the Holodomor	2007	
	Bereznehuvate	Bashtanka Raion	Mykolaiv Oblast	Memorial to the victims of the Holodomor	2007	
	Bohemka	Pervomaisk Raion	Mykolaiv Oblast	Commemorative plaque for the victims of the Holodomor	2008	
	Khrystoforiwka	Bashtanka Raion	Mykolaiv Oblast	Memorial to the victims of the Holodomor	2007	
	Domanivka	Voznesensk Raion	Mykolaiv Oblast	Memorial to the victims of the Holodomor	2008	
	Yelanets	Voznesensk Raion	Mykolaiv Oblast	Memorial chapel for the victims of the Holodomor	2007	
	Kazanka	Bashtanka Raion	Mykolaiv Oblast	Memorial to the victims of the Holodomor	2006	
	Kyselivka	Mykolaiv Raion	Mykolaiv Oblast	Memorial stone for the victims of the Holodomor	2008	
	Lysa Hora	Pervomaisk Raion	Mykolaiv Oblast	Memorial to the victims of the Holodomor	2008	
	Mykhailo-Laryne	Mykolaiv Raion	Mykolaiv Oblast	Memorial to the victims of the Holodomor	2008	
	Nova Odesa	Mykolaiv Raion	Mykolaiv Oblast	Memorial cross for the victims of the Holodomor		
	Novoivanivka	Bashtanka Raion	Mykolaiv Oblast	Commemorative plaque for the victims of the Holodomor	2007	
	Novokrasne	Pervomaisk Raion	Mykolaiv Oblast	Memorial to the victims of the Holodomor		
	Novooleksandrivka	Pervomaisk Raion	Mykolaiv Oblast	Memorial to the victims of the Holodomor	1991	
	Novoserhiivka	Bashtanka Raion	Mykolaiv Oblast	Memorial to the victims of the Holodomor	2008	
	Novovasylivka	Pervomaisk Raion	Mykolaiv Oblast	Commemorative plaque for the victims of the Holodomor	2008	
	Mykolaiv	Mykolaiv Raion	Mykolaiv Oblast	Memorial to the victims of the Holodomor	1993	
	Pavlivka	Bashtanka Raion	Mykolaiv Oblast	Memorial to the victims of the Holodomor		
	Pidlisne	Mykolaiv Raion	Mykolaiv Oblast	Commemorative plaque for the victims of the Holodomor		
	Pisky	Bashtanka Raion	Mykolaiv Oblast	Memorial to the victims of the Holodomor	2008	
	Prybuzhzhia	Voznesensk Raion	Mykolaiv Oblast	Memorial to the victims of the Holodomor	2008	
	Shchaslyvka	Voznesensk Raion	Mykolaiv Oblast	Commemorative plaque for the victims of the Holodomor	2008	
	Chausove	Pervomaisk Raion	Mykolaiv Oblast	Memorial stone for the victims of the Holodomor		
	Velykovesele	Pervomaisk Raion	Mykolaiv Oblast	Commemorative plaque for the victims of the Holodomor	2008	
	Voievodske	Pervomaisk Raion	Mykolaiv Oblast	Memorial to the victims of the Holodomor	2008	
	Voznesensk	Voznesensk Raion	Mykolaiv Oblast	Memorial to the victims of the Holodomor	2008	
	Vradiivka	Pervomaisk Raion	Mykolaiv Oblast	Memorial cross for the victims of the Holodomor	2008	
	Kajiry	Berezivka Raion	Odesa Oblast	Memorial to the victims of the Holodomor		
	Brytivka	Bilhorod-Dnistrovskyi Raion	Odesa Oblast	Memorial to the victims of the Holodomor	2008	
	Karnaliivka	Bilhorod-Dnistrovskyi Raion	Odesa Oblast	Memorial cross for the victims of the Holodomor	2008	
	Lyman	Bilhorod-Dnistrovskyi Raion	Odesa Oblast	Commemorative plaque for the victims of the Holodomor		
	Moloha	Bilhorod-Dnistrovskyi Raion	Odesa Oblast	Memorial to the victims of the Holodomor		
	Prymorske	Bilhorod-Dnistrovskyi Raion	Odesa Oblast	Memorial to the victims of the Holodomor	2008	
	Shyriaieve	Bilhorod-Dnistrovskyi Raion	Odesa Oblast	Memorial chapel and memorial stone for the victims of the Holodomor	2008	
	Tuzly	Bilhorod-Dnistrovskyi Raion	Odesa Oblast	Memorial to the victims of the Holodomor	2008	
	Kubei	Bolhrad Raion	Odesa Oblast	Memorial to the victims of the Holodomor	2022	
	Liutenka	Hadiach Raion	Poltava Oblast	Memorial to the victims of the Holodomor		
	Oleksiivka	Kodyma Raion	Odesa Oblast	Memorial cross for the victims of the Holodomor		
	Khorol	Khorol Raion	Poltava Oblast	Memorial cross for the victims of the Holodomor		
	Hradyzk	Kremenchuk Raion	Poltava Oblast	Memorial to the victims of the Holodomor		
	Kamiani Potoky	Kremenchuk Raion	Poltava Oblast	Memorial to the victims of the Holodomor	2008	
	Kremenchuk	Kremenchuk Raion	Poltava Oblast	A memorial stone to the victims of the Holodomor at the ‘Victims of the Holocaust’ memorial complex		
	Kremenchuk	Kremenchuk Raion	Poltava Oblast	Memorial to the victims of the Holodomor at the cemetery on Beton St.		
	Kyiashky	Kremenchuk Raion	Poltava Oblast	Memorial cross for the victims of the Holodomor		
	Manzhelia	Kremenchuk Raion	Poltava Oblast	Memorial cross for the victims of the Holodomor	1993	
	Omelnyk	Kremenchuk Raion	Poltava Oblast	Memorial to the victims of the Holodomor		
	Potoky	Kremenchuk Raion	Poltava Oblast	Memorial cross for the victims of the Holodomor		
	Berezivka	Lubny Raion	Poltava Oblast	Memorial cross for the victims of the Holodomor		
	Hrebinka	Lubny Raion	Poltava Oblast	Memorial to the victims of the Holodomor	1992	
	Hryhorivka	Lubny Raion	Poltava Oblast	Memorial cross for the victims of the Holodomor	2006	
	Lubny	Lubny Raion	Poltava Oblast	Kurgan of Sorrow	1993	
	Lutaika	Lubny Raion	Poltava Oblast	Memorial cross for the victims of the Holodomor	2006	
	Oleksandrivka, Hrebinka	Lubny Raion	Poltava Oblast	Memorial cross for the victims of the Holodomor	1998	
	Tarasivka	Lubny Raion	Poltava Oblast	Memorial cross for the victims of the Holodomor	2005	
	Serbka	Lyman Raion	Odesa Oblast	Memorial to the victims of the Holodomor	2008	
	Stari Shompoly	Lyman Raion	Odesa Oblast	Memorial to the victims of the Holodomor	2008	
	Lokhvytsia	Myrhorod Raion	Poltava Oblast	Memorial chapel for the victims of the Holodomor		
	Lokhvytsia	Myrhorod Raion	Poltava Oblast	Memorial cross for the victims of the Holodomor		
	Myrhorod	Myrhorod Raion	Poltava Oblast	Memorial to the victims of the Holodomor		
	Myrhorod	Myrhorod Raion	Poltava Oblast	Memorial to the victims of the Holodomor		
	Pisky	Myrhorod Raion	Poltava Oblast	Memorial stone for the victims of the Holodomor	2008	
	Poharshchyna	Myrhorod Raion	Poltava Oblast	Memorial cross for the victims of the Holodomor		
	Rozbyshivka	Myrhorod Raion	Poltava Oblast	Memorial cross for the victims of the Holodomor	2016	
	Sencha	Myrhorod Raion	Poltava Oblast	Memorial cross for the victims of the Holodomor		
	Zavodske	Myrhorod Raion	Poltava Oblast	Memorial to the victims of the Holodomor		
	Yaresky	Myrhorod Raion	Poltava Oblast	Memorial to the victims of the Holodomor		
	Velyki Sorochyntsi	Myrhorod Raion	Poltava Oblast	Memorial cross for the victims of the Holodomor	2013	
	Bahate	Izmail Raion	Odesa Oblast	Memorial to the victims of the Holodomor	2015	
	Avhustivka	Odesa Raion	Odesa Oblast	Memorial to the victims of the Holodomor	2008	
	Dobroslav	Odesa Raion	Odesa Oblast	Memorial to the victims of the Holodomor	2007	
	Ivanove	Odesa Raion	Odesa Oblast	Memorial to the victims of the Holodomor		
	Kalynivka	Odesa Raion	Odesa Oblast	Memorial to the victims of the Holodomor	2008	
	Kremydivka	Odesa Raion	Odesa Oblast	Commemorative plaque for the victims of the Holodomor	2008	
	Odesa	Odesa Raion	Odesa Oblast	Memorial to the victims of the Holodomor		
	Onyskove	Odesa Raion	Odesa Oblast	Memorial to the victims of the Holodomor	2008	
	Obzhyle	Podilsk Raion	Odesa Oblast	Memorial cross for the victims of the Holodomor	2008	
	Ananiv	Podilsk Raion	Odesa Oblast	Memorial cross for the victims of the Holodomor		
	Balta	Podilsk Raion	Odesa Oblast	Memorial to the victims of the Holodomor		
	Hetmanivka	Podilsk Raion	Odesa Oblast	Memorial cross for the victims of the Holodomor	2008	
	Kodyma	Podilsk Raion	Odesa Oblast	Memorial to the victims of the Holodomor		
	Kontseba	Podilsk Raion	Odesa Oblast	Memorial to the victims of the Holodomor		
	Kozatske	Podilsk Raion	Odesa Oblast	Memorial to the victims of the Holodomor		
	Lisnychivka	Podilsk Raion	Odesa Oblast	Memorial cross for the victims of the Holodomor	2007	
	Liubashivka	Podilsk Raion	Odesa Oblast	Memorial cross for the victims of the Holodomor		
	Okny	Podilsk Raion	Odesa Oblast	Memorial to the victims of the Holodomor		
	Pereima	Podilsk Raion	Odesa Oblast	Memorial cross for the victims of the Holodomor		
	Perelioty	Podilsk Raion	Odesa Oblast	Memorial cross for the victims of the Holodomor	2008	
	Pishchana	Podilsk Raion	Odesa Oblast	Memorial cross for the victims of the Holodomor		
	Podilsk	Podilsk Raion	Odesa Oblast	Memorial to the victims of the Holodomor		
	Polianetske	Podilsk Raion	Odesa Oblast	Memorial cross for the victims of the Holodomor	2008	
	Poznanka Druha	Podilsk Raion	Odesa Oblast	Memorial cross for the victims of the Holodomor	1992	
	Poznanka Persha	Podilsk Raion	Odesa Oblast	Memorial cross for the victims of the Holodomor	1992	
	Sarazhynka	Podilsk Raion	Odesa Oblast	Memorial to the victims of the Holodomor	2008	
	Savran	Podilsk Raion	Odesa Oblast	Memorial to the victims of the Holodomor	1996	
	Tymkove	Podilsk Raion	Odesa Oblast	Memorial cross for the victims of the Holodomor		
	Abazivka	Poltava Raion	Poltava Oblast	Memorial cross for the victims of the Holodomor		
	Hozhuly	Poltava Raion	Poltava Oblast	Memorial to the victims of the Holodomor		
	Kalenyky	Poltava Raion	Poltava Oblast	Memorial to the victims of the Holodomor	1993	
	Khreshchate	Poltava Raion	Poltava Oblast	Memorial to the victims of the Holodomor		
	Lobachi	Poltava Raion	Poltava Oblast	Memorial to the victims of the Holodomor	1990	
	Markivka	Poltava Raion	Poltava Oblast	Memorial cross for the victims of the Holodomor		
	Miakenkivka	Poltava Raion	Poltava Oblast	Memorial cross for the victims of the Holodomor		
	Mykolaivka	Poltava Raion	Poltava Oblast	Memorial to the victims of the Holodomor		
	Naderzhynshchyna	Poltava Raion	Poltava Oblast	Memorial to the victims of the Holodomor		
	Nekhvoroshcha	Poltava Raion	Poltava Oblast	Memorial cross for the victims of the Holodomor	2008	
	Novi Sanzhary	Poltava Raion	Poltava Oblast	Memorial to the victims of the Holodomor		
	Opishnia	Poltava Raion	Poltava Oblast	Memorial to the victims of the Holodomor	2018	
	Ostapye	Poltava Raion	Poltava Oblast	Memorial to the victims of the Holodomor		
	Perehonivka	Poltava Raion	Poltava Oblast	Memorial to the victims of the Holodomor		
	Petrivka	Poltava Raion	Poltava Oblast	Memorial to the victims of the Holodomor		
	Pokrovske	Poltava Raion	Poltava Oblast	Memorial to the victims of the Holodomor		
	Poltava	Poltava Raion	Poltava Oblast	Memorial to the victims of the Holodomor		
	Popove	Poltava Raion	Poltava Oblast	Monument to the victims of the Holodomor		
	Reshetylivka	Poltava Raion	Poltava Oblast	Memorial to the victims of the Holodomor		
	Seleshchyna	Poltava Raion	Poltava Oblast	Memorial to the victims of the Holodomor	2004	
	Stovbyna Dolyna	Poltava Raion	Poltava Oblast	Memorial to the victims of the Holodomor		
	Suprunivka	Poltava Raion	Poltava Oblast	Memorial to the victims of the Holodomor	2009	
	Tryby	Poltava Oblast	Poltava Oblast	Memorial site for the victims of the repressions	1995	
	Markivka	Rozdilna Raion	Odesa Oblast	Memorial to the victims of the Holodomor		
	Novoukrainka	Rozdilna Raion	Odesa Oblast	Memorial to the victims of the Holodomor		
	Rozdilna	Rozdilna Raion	Odesa Oblast	Memorial to the victims of the Holodomor	2007	
	Zakhariwka	Rozdilna Raion	Odesa Oblast	Memorial cross for the victims of the Holodomor		
	Velyka Bahachka	Velyka Bahachka Raion	Poltava Oblast	Memorial to the victims of the Holodomor		
	Demydivka	Demydivka Raion	Rivne Oblast	Memorial to the victims of the Holodomor		
	Korets	Rivne Oblast	Rivne Oblast	Memorial to the victims of the Holodomor		
	Radyvyliv	Radyvyliv Raion	Rivne Oblast	Memorial to the victims of the Holodomor		
	Ustia	Rivne Raion	Rivne Oblast	Memorial cross for the victims of the Holodomor		
	Altynivka	Konotop Raion	Sumy Oblast	Memorial cross for the victims of the Holodomor	2008	
	Chernecha Sloboda	Konotop Raion	Sumy Oblast	Memorial cross for the victims of the Holodomor	2007	
	Deptivka	Konotop Raion	Sumy Oblast	Memorial cross for the victims of the Holodomor	2008	
	Konotop	Konotop Raion	Sumy Oblast	Memorial to the victims of the Holodomor	2008	
	Kosatske	Konotop Raion	Sumy Oblast	Memorial cross for the victims of the Holodomor		
	Pisky	Konotop Raion	Sumy Oblast	Memorial to the victims of the Holodomor	2007	
	Vorontsove	Konotop Raion	Sumy Oblast	Memorial to the victims of the Holodomor	1993	
	Krasnopillia	Krasnopillia Raion	Sumy Oblast	Memorial to the victims of the Holodomor		
	Bakyrivka	Okhtyrka Raion	Sumy Oblast	Memorial cross for the victims of the Holodomor		
	Boromlia	Okhtyrka Raion	Sumy Oblast	Memorial to the victims of the Holodomor		
	Riabyna	Okhtyrka Raion	Sumy Oblast	Memorial cross for the victims of the Holodomor	1993	
	Trostianets	Okhtyrka Raion	Sumy Oblast	Memorial to the victims of the Holodomor	1993	
	Hlynsk	Romny Raion	Sumy Oblast	Memorial to the victims of the Holodomor	2007	
	Khmeliv	Romny Raion	Sumy Oblast	Memorial cross for the victims of the Holodomor		
	Khoruzhivka	Romny Raion	Sumy Oblast	Memorial to the victims of the Holodomor		
	Nedryhailiv	Romny Raion	Sumy Oblast	Commemorative plaque for the victims of the Holodomor		
	Pidstavky	Romny Raion	Sumy Oblast	Memorial cross for the victims of the Holodomor	2008	
	Romny	Romny Raion	Sumy Oblast	Memorial to the victims of the Holodomor	2008	
	Semenivka	Romny Raion	Sumy Oblast	Memorial cross for the victims of the Holodomor	2008	
	Smile	Romny Raion	Sumy Oblast	Memorial to the victims of the Holodomor		
	Sulymy	Romny Raion	Sumy Oblast	Memorial to the victims of the Holodomor	2008	
	Viunne	Romny Raion	Sumy Oblast	Memorial cross for the victims of the Holodomor		
	Voloshnivka	Romny Raion	Sumy Oblast	Memorial cross for the victims of the Holodomor	2008	
	Bereza	Shostka Raion	Sumy Oblast	Memorial cross for the victims of the Holodomor	2006	
	Slout	Shostka Raion	Sumy Oblast	Memorial cross for the victims of the Holodomor	2008	
	Bezdryk	Sumy Raion	Sumy Oblast	Memorial cross for the victims of the Holodomor		
	Bilopillia	Sumy Raion	Sumy Oblast	Memorial to the victims of the Holodomor	2008	
	Kaltchenky	Sumy Raion	Sumy Oblast	Memorial cross for the victims of the Holodomor	2008	
	Kindrativka	Sumy Raion	Sumy Oblast	Memorial to the victims of the Holodomor	2008	
	Kuianivka	Sumy Raion	Sumy Oblast	Memorial to the victims of the Holodomor		
	Lebedyn	Sumy Raion	Sumy Oblast	Memorial to the victims of the Holodomor	1993	
	Markivka	Sumy Raion	Sumy Oblast	Memorial stone for the victims of the Holodomor	2008	
	Mychailivka, Lebedyn	Sumy Raion	Sumy Oblast	Memorial cross for the victims of the Holodomor	2008	
	Severynivka	Sumy Raion	Sumy Oblast	Memorial cross for the victims of the Holodomor	2003	
	Riasne	Sumy Raion	Sumy Oblast	Memorial cross for the victims of the Holodomor	2008	
	Shpylivka	Sumy Raion	Sumy Oblast	Memorial to the victims of the Holodomor		
	Starykove	Shostka Raion	Sumy Oblast	Memorial cross for the victims of the Holodomor	2008	
	Hlukhiv	Shostka Raion	Sumy Oblast	Memorial to the victims of the Holodomor	2008	
	Sumy	Sumy Raion	Sumy Oblast	Memorial to the victims of the Holodomor	2008	
	Vorozhba	Sumy Raion	Sumy Oblast	Memorial to the victims of the Holodomor	1993	
	Velyka Pysarivka	Velyka Pysarivka Raion	Sumy Oblast	Memorial cross for the victims of the Holodomor	1992	
	Yampil	Yampil Raion	Sumy Oblast	Memorial to the victims of the Holodomor	2007	
	Anhelivka	Chortkiv Raion	Ternopil Oblast	Memorial cross for the victims of the Holodomor	1996	
	Bila	Chortkiv Raion	Ternopil Oblast	Memorial cross for the victims of the Holodomor	1993	
	Bila	Chortkiv Raion	Ternopil Oblast	Memorial cross for the victims of the Holodomor		
	Ozeriany	Chortkiv Raion	Ternopil Oblast	Memorial chapel for the victims of the Holodomor	1996	
	Pyshchatynzi	Chortkiv Raion	Ternopil Oblast	Memorial to the victims of the Holodomor	1993	
	Ternopil	Ternopil Raion	Ternopil Oblast	Memorial to the victims of the Holodomor		
	Vaha	Ternopil Raion	Ternopil Oblast	Memorial to the victims of the Holodomor	1995	
	Bar	Bar Raion	Vinnytsia Oblast	Memorial stone for the victims of the Holodomor		
	Bershad	Bershad Raion	Vinnytsia Oblast	Memorial to the victims of the Holodomor	1993	
	Ternivka	Haisyn Raion	Vinnytsia Oblast	Memorial to the victims of the Holodomor		
	Chechelnyk	Haisyn Raion	Vinnytsia Oblast	Memorial to the victims of the Holodomor		
	Obodivka	Haisyn Raion	Vinnytsia Oblast	Memorial to the victims of the Holodomor		
	Hubnyk	Haisyn Raion	Vinnytsia Oblast	Memorial cross for the victims of the Holodomor	2007	
	Slobodyshtche	Haisyn Raion	Vinnytsia Oblast	Memorial cross for the victims of the Holodomor		
	Sobolivka	Haisyn Raion	Vinnytsia Oblast	Memorial cross for the victims of the Holodomor		
	Olhopil	Haisyn Raion	Vinnytsia Oblast	Memorial to the victims of the Holodomor		
	Chetvertynivka	Haisyn Raion	Vinnytsia Oblast	Mass grave containing the 246 victims of the Holodomor		
	Kalynivka	Kalynivka Raion	Vinnytsia Oblast	Memorial to the victims of the Holodomor		
	Khmilnyk	Khmilnyk Raion	Vinnytsia Oblast	Memorial to the victims of the Holodomor	2020	
	Ivankivtsi	Khmilnyk Raion	Vinnytsia Oblast	Memorial cross for the victims of the Holodomor	2022	
	Kotiuzhyntsi	Khmilnyk Raion	Vinnytsia Oblast	Memorial cross for the victims of the Holodomor	1993	
	Makharynzi	Khmilnyk Raion	Vinnytsia Oblast	Memorial to the victims of the Holodomor		
	Myrne	Khmilnyk Raion	Vinnytsia Oblast	Memorial to the victims of the Holodomor		
	Nova Hreblia	Khmilnyk Raion	Vinnytsia Oblast	Memorial cross for the victims of the Holodomor		
	Petrykivtsi	Khmilnyk Raion	Vinnytsia Oblast	Memorial to the victims of the Holodomor	1993	
	Chesnivka	Khmilnyk Raion	Vinnytsia Oblast	Memorial to the victims of the Holodomor	1993	
	Chepeli	Khmilnyk Raion	Vinnytsia Oblast	Memorial to the victims of the Holodomor		
	Lityn	Lityn Raion	Vinnytsia Oblast	Memorial cross for the victims of the Holodomor and political repressions 1932–1933		
	Druzhba	Mohyliv-Podilskyi Raion	Vinnytsia Oblast	Memorial cross for the victims of the Holodomor	1995	
	Biliany	Mohyliv-Podilskyi Raion	Vinnytsia Oblast	Memorial to the victims of the Holodomor	1993	
	Babchyntsi	Mohyliv-Podilskyi Raion	Vinnytsia Oblast	Memorial to the victims of the Holodomor	1993	
	Murovani Kurylivtsi	Murovani Kurylivtsi Raion	Vinnytsia Oblast	Memorial cross for the victims of the Holodomor		
	Obukhiv	Mohyliv-Podilskyi Raion	Vinnytsia Oblast	Memorial to the victims of the Holodomor		
	Suhaky	Mohyliv-Podilskyi Raion	Vinnytsia Oblast	Memorial to the victims of the Holodomor	2008	
	Borshchahivka	Pohrebyshche Raion	Vinnytsia Oblast	Memorial to the victims of the Holodomor		
	Pohrebyshche	Pohrebyshche Raion	Vinnytsia Oblast	Memorial to the victims of the Holodomor		
	Orativ	Orativ Raion	Vinnytsia Oblast	Memorial cross for the victims of the Holodomor		
	Teplyk	Teplyk Raion	Vinnytsia Oblast	Memorial to the victims of the Holodomor		
	Trostianets	Trostianets Raion	Vinnytsia Oblast	Memorial cross for the victims of the Holodomor	1993	
	Kryzhopil	Tulchyn Raion	Vinnytsia Oblast	Memorial to the victims of the Holodomor		
	Velyka Rusava	Tulchyn Raion	Vinnytsia Oblast	Memorial cross for the victims of the Holodomor		
	Stina	Tulchyn Raion	Vinnytsia Oblast	Memorial to the victims of the Holodomor	2019	
	Sokolivka	Tulchyn Raion	Vinnytsia Oblast	Memorial cross for the victims of the Holodomor		
	Andrushivka	Vinnytsia Raion	Vinnytsia Oblast	Memorial to the victims of the Holodomor		
	Bahrynivtsi	Vinnytsia Raion	Vinnytsia Oblast	Memorial cross for the victims of the Holodomor		
	Berezivka	Vinnytsia Raion	Vinnytsia Oblast	Memorial cross for the victims of the Holodomor		
	Brytske	Vinnytsia Raion	Vinnytsia Oblast	Memorial cross for the victims of the Holodomor		
	Dovhalivka	Vinnytsia Raion	Vinnytsia Oblast	Memorial cross for the victims of the Holodomor		
	Hopchytsia	Vinnytsia Raion	Vinnytsia Oblast	Memorial to the victims of the Holodomor		
	Frontivka	Vinnytsia Raion	Vinnytsia Oblast	Memorial to the victims of the Holodomor	1993	
	Yakymivka, Orativ	Vinnytsia Raion	Vinnytsia Oblast	Mass grave of 111 victims of the Holodomor		
	Yushkivtsi	Vinnytsia Raion	Vinnytsia Oblast	Mass grave of 495 victims of the Holodomor		
	Kostiantynivka	Vinnytsia Raion	Vinnytsia Oblast	Memorial to the victims of the Holodomor		
	Novozhyvotiv	Vinnytsia Raion	Vinnytsia Oblast	Memorial to the victims of the Holodomor		
	Olenivka	Vinnytsia Raion	Vinnytsia Oblast	Memorial to the victims of the Holodomor	1990	
	Orativka	Vinnytsia Raion	Vinnytsia Oblast	Memorial to the victims of the Holodomor		
	Pidvysoke	Vinnytsia Raion	Vinnytsia Oblast	Memorial to the victims of the Holodomor		
	Pryberezhne	Vinnytsia Raion	Vinnytsia Oblast	Memorial to the victims of the Holodomor		
	Rososha	Vinnytsia Raion	Vinnytsia Oblast	Memorial to the victims of the Holodomor	1996	
	Rozhychna	Vinnytsia Raion	Vinnytsia Oblast	Memorial cross for the victims of the Holodomor		
	Zbarzhivka	Vinnytsia Raion	Vinnytsia Oblast	Memorial to the victims of the Holodomor		
	Shershni	Vinnytsia Raion	Vinnytsia Oblast	Memorial to the victims of the Holodomor		
	Zhornyshche	Vinnytsia Raion	Vinnytsia Oblast	Memorial to the victims of the Holodomor		
	Zhyvotivka	Vinnytsia Raion	Vinnytsia Oblast	Memorial to the victims of the Holodomor		
	Selyshtche, Lityn	Vinnytsia Raion	Vinnytsia Oblast	Memorial to the victims of the Holodomor		
	Skytka	Vinnytsia Raion	Vinnytsia Oblast	Memorial to the victims of the Holodomor	2022	
	Turbiv	Vinnytsia Raion	Vinnytsia Oblast	Memorial to the victims of the Holodomor		
	Tyvriv	Vinnytsia Raion	Vinnytsia Oblast	Commemorative plaque for the victims of the Holodomor	1993	
	Tyvriv	Vinnytsia Raion	Vinnytsia Oblast	Memorial to the victims of the Holodomor		
	Vasylivka, Tyvriv	Vinnytsia Raion	Vinnytsia Oblast	Memorial cross for the victims of the Holodomor		
	Velyki Krushlyntsi	Vinnytsia Raion	Vinnytsia Oblast	Memorial to the victims of the Holodomor	1991	
	Vinnytsia	Vinnytsia Raion	Vinnytsia Oblast	Memorial to the victims of the Holodomor	2008	
	Vinnytsia	Vinnytsia Raion	Vinnytsia Oblast	Memorial to the victims of the Holodomor at Pidlisne Cemetery	2008	
	Brailiv	Zhmerynka Raion	Vinnytsia Oblast	Memorial to the victims of the Holodomor		
	Marianivka	Zhmerynka Raion	Vinnytsia Oblast	Memorial cross for the victims of the Holodomor		
	Sharhorod	Zhmerynka Raion	Vinnytsia Oblast	Memorial to the victims of the Holodomor		
	Zhmerynka	Zhmerynka Raion	Vinnytsia Oblast	Memorial to the victims of the Holodomor	2018	
	Zhukivtsi	Zhmerynka Raion	Vinnytsia Oblast	Memorial to the victims of the Holodomor		
	Berdychiv	Berdychiv Raion	Zhytomyr Oblast	Memorial to the victims of the Holodomor	2016	
	Ivankivtsi	Berdychiv Raion	Zhytomyr Oblast	Memorial cross for the victims of the Holodomor		
	Lisova Slobidka	Berdychiv Raion	Zhytomyr Oblast	Memorial cross for the victims of the Holodomor		
	Velyki Hadomtsi	Berdychiv Raion	Zhytomyr Oblast	Memorial cross for the victims of the Holodomor	1994	
	Yaroslavka	Berdychiv Raion	Zhytomyr Oblast	Memorial to the victims of the Holodomor	1991	
	Korosten	Korosten Raion	Zhytomyr Oblast	Memorial cross for the victims of the Holodomor		
	Luhyny	Korosten Raion	Zhytomyr Oblast	Memorial to the victims of the Holodomor		
	Malyn	Korosten Raion	Zhytomyr Oblast	Memorial to the victims of the Holodomor	2003	
	Meleni	Korosten Raion	Zhytomyr Oblast	Memorial to the victims of the Holodomor		
	Ovruch	Korosten Raion	Zhytomyr Oblast	Memorial to the victims of the Holodomor	2004	
	Chervona Voloka	Korosten Raion	Zhytomyr Oblast	Memorial to the victims of the Holodomor	2007	
	Chopovychi	Korosten Raion	Zhytomyr Oblast	Memorial cross for the victims of the Holodomor	2007	
	Cherniakhiv	Zhytomyr Raion	Zhytomyr Oblast	Memorial to the victims of the Holodomor	2008	
	Chudniv	Zhytomyr Raion	Zhytomyr Oblast	Memorial to the victims of the Holodomor	2017	
	Horodske	Zhytomyr Raion	Zhytomyr Oblast	Memorial to the victims of the Holodomor at the Monastery of the Holy Spirit	2009	
	Khodorkiv	Zhytomyr Raion	Zhytomyr Oblast	Memorial to the victims of the Holodomor		
	Khoroshiv	Zhytomyr Raion	Zhytomyr Oblast	Memorial to the victims of the Holodomor		
	Kodnia	Zhytomyr Raion	Zhytomyr Oblast	Memorial site for the victims of the Holodomor	2013	
	Korostyshiv	Zhytomyr Raion	Zhytomyr Oblast	Memorial to the victims of the Holodomor	2005	
	Kotliarka	Zhytomyr Raion	Zhytomyr Oblast	Memorial cross for the victims of the Holodomor	1993	
	Kryve	Zhytomyr Raion	Zhytomyr Oblast	Memorial cross for the victims of the Holodomor	2003	
	Kvitneve	Zhytomyr Raion	Zhytomyr Oblast	Memorial to the victims of the Holodomor	1991	
	Lisna Rudnia	Zhytomyr Raion	Zhytomyr Oblast	Memorial to the victims of the Holodomor	2006	
	Liubar	Zhytomyr Raion	Zhytomyr Oblast	Memorial to the victims of the Holodomor		
	Mokrenshchyna	Zhytomyr Raion	Zhytomyr Oblast	Memorial to the victims of the Holodomor	2008	
	Novohorodetske	Zhytomyr Raion	Zhytomyr Oblast	Memorial cross for the victims of the Holodomor	2008	
	Novyi Zavod	Zhytomyr Raion	Zhytomyr Oblast	Memorial cross for the victims of the Holodomor and political repressions	2007	
	Nova Chortoryia	Zhytomyr Raion	Zhytomyr Oblast	Memorial to the victims of the Holodomor	2007	
	Ocheretianka, Pulyny	Zhytomyr Raion	Zhytomyr Oblast	Memorial to the victims of the Holodomor		
	Popilnia	Zhytomyr Raion	Zhytomyr Oblast	Memorial cross for the victims of the Holodomor	2007	
	Radomyshl	Zhytomyr Raion	Zhytomyr Oblast	Memorial cross for the victims of the Holodomor		
	Zhytomyr	Zhytomyr Raion	Zhytomyr Oblast	Commemorative plaque for the victims of the Holodomor	2008	
	Zhytomyr	Zhytomyr Raion	Zhytomyr Oblast	Memorial to the victims of the Holodomor	2006	
	Kyianka	Zviahel Raion	Zhytomyr Oblast	Memorial cross for the victims of the Holodomor	2005	
	Susly	Zviahel Raion	Zhytomyr Oblast	Memorial to the victims of the Holodomor	2007	
	Zviahel	Zviahel Raion	Zhytomyr Oblast	Memorial to the victims of the Holodomor		
	Kvasovo	Berehove Raion	Zakarpattia Oblast	Memorial cross for the victims of the Holodomor		
	Irshava	Khust Raion	Zakarpattia Oblast	Memorial to the victims of the Holodomor		
	Mukachevo	Mukachevo Raion	Zakarpattia Oblast	Memorial to the victims of the Holodomor		
	Mukachevo	Mukachevo Raion	Zakarpattia Oblast	Memorial to the victims of the Holodomor		
	Uzhhorod	Uzhhorod Raion	Zakarpattia Oblast	Memorial to the victims of the Holodomor		
	Berdiansk	Berdiansk Raion	Zaporizhzhia Oblast	Memorial to the victims of the Holodomor	2007	
	Prymorsk	Berdiansk Raion	Zaporizhzhia Oblast	Memorial cross for the victims of the Holodomor		
	Divnynske	Melitopol Raion	Zaporizhzhia Oblast	Memorial to the victims of the Holodomor	2007	
	Kostiantynivka	Melitopol Raion	Zaporizhzhia Oblast	Memorial to the victims of the Holodomor	2006	
	Melitopol	Melitopol Raion	Zaporizhzhia Oblast	Memorial cross for the victims of the Holodomor		
	Bilmanka	Polohy Raion	Zaporizhzhia Oblast	Memorial to the victims of the Holodomor	2007	
	Hryhorivka	Polohy Raion	Zaporizhzhia Oblast	Memorial to the victims of the Holodomor	1987	
	Huliaipole	Polohy Raion	Zaporizhzhia Oblast	Memorial cross for the victims of the Holodomor	1992	
	Kamianka	Polohy Raion	Zaporizhzhia Oblast	Memorial cross for the victims of the Holodomor		
	Malynivka	Polohy Raion	Zaporizhzhia Oblast	Memorial to the victims of the Holodomor	2008	
	Pokrovske	Polohy Raion	Zaporizhzhia Oblast	Memorial to the victims of the Holodomor	2008	
	Chekhohrad	Melitopol Raion	Zaporizhzhia Oblast	Memorial to the victims of the Holodomor	2018	
	Strohanivka	Melitopol Raion	Zaporizhzhia Oblast	Memorial site for the victims of the Holodomor		
	Viazivka	Melitopol Raion	Zaporizhzhia Oblast	Memorial cross for the victims of the Holodomor	2008	
	Voznesenka	Melitopol Raion	Zaporizhzhia Oblast	Memorial to the victims of the Holodomor	2008	
	Udarnyk	Polohy Raion	Zaporizhzhia Oblast	Memorial stone for the victims of the Holodomor		
	Varvarivka	Polohy Raion	Zaporizhzhia Oblast	Memorial cross for the victims of the Holodomor		
	Pryshyb	Vasylivka Raion	Zaporizhzhia Oblast	Memorial to the victims of the Holodomor	2008	
	Velyka Bilozerka	Vasylivka Raion,	Zaporizhzhia Oblast	Memorial cross for the victims of the Holodomor		
	Rozivka	Polohy Raion	Zaporizhzhia Oblast	Memorial stone for the victims of the Holodomor	2007	
	Balabyne	Zaporizhzhia Raion	Zaporizhzhia Oblast	Memorial cross for the victims of the Holodomor		
	Novomykolaivka	Zaporizhzhia Raion	Zaporizhzhia Oblast	Memorial to the victims of the Holodomor	2008	
	Zaporizhzhia	Zaporizhzhia Raion	Zaporizhzhia Oblast	Commemorative plaque for the infants, victims of the Holodomor		
	Zaporizhzhia	Zaporizhzhia Raion	Zaporizhzhia Oblast	Memorial to the victims of the Holodomor	2007	
	Vilniansk	Zaporizhzhia Raion	Zaporizhzhia Oblast	Memorial to the victims of the Holodomor	2007	

== Hungary ==
Image	Location	Description	Unveiled	Ref.
	Budapest	Memorial to the victims of the Holodomor	2009	
	Csömör	Memorial stone for the victims of the Holodomor an der Gloria Victis Memorial	2010	
	Nyiregyhaza	Memorial to the victims of the Holodomor	2019	
	Szeged	Memorial to the victims of the Holodomor	2018	

== United Kingdom ==
Image	Location	Description	Unveiled	Ref.
	Edinburgh	Memorial to the victims of the Holodomor	2017	
	London	Memorial to the victims of the Holodomor in Acton	1983	
	Rochdale, Memorial Gardens Rochdale	Memorial to the victims of the Holodomor	2009	

== United States ==
Image	Location	Description	Unveiled	Ref.
	Chicago	Monument at the Ukrainian Orthodox Church of St Andrew	1993	
	New Jersey, South Bound Brook	St Andrew's Orthodox Memorial Cathedral	1965	
	New York, East Meadow	Memorial stone in Eisenhower Park	1983	
	Los Angeles	Memorial to the victims of the Holodomor	1986	
	Parma (Ohio)	Monument to the victims of the Holodomor	1993	
	Washington, D.C.	Holodomor Genocide Memorial	2015	

== See also ==
- List of Ukrainian cultural figures persecuted by the Soviet Union
- List of Holocaust memorials and museums
- Bibliography of Ukrainian history
- Outline of the Holodomor
- Bibliography of the Holodomor
