= Mykhailo-Laryne =

Village in Mykolaiv Oblast, Ukraine

Coordinates: 47°6′36″N 32°1′12″E

Mykhailo-Laryne (Ukrainian: Михайло-Ларине; also known as Mikhailo-Larino) is a village in Mykolaiv Raion, Mykolaiv Oblast, Ukraine. It belongs to Voskresenske settlement hromada, one of the hromadas of Ukraine.

It is located on the Inhul River, 25 km northeast of Mykolaiv. The village was founded at the end of the 18th century, and had a population of 1,918 in 2007. It was first known as Mikhailovka; its name was changed to Mikhailo-Larievka in 1896 and to Mikhailo-Laryne at the end of World War II in 1945.

== Population ==
- 1795: 104
- 1859: 183
- 1887: 330
- 1916: 386
- 2006: 1,869
- 2007: 1,918

In accordance with resolutions passed by the Verkhovna Rada (Ukrainian parliament), on May 15, 2011, elections will be held for many village mayors, including the mayor of Mykhailo-Laryne.

== History ==
=== 1774 to 1917 ===
The village was founded in 1774, at the end of the Russo-Turkish War (1768-1774), on the left bank of the river Inhul (Tatar for "new lake") between the Dnieper and Southern Bug Rivers in the Russian Empire.

Originally there were two settlements - Mikhaylovka (named for its owner), founded in the late eighteenth century and Larievka, founded in 1781 by Major General Petr S. Lariy. In 1794, Lariy acquired Mikhaylovka village; some contemporary maps show two Larievkas. Mikhaylovka/Larievka predated Mykolaiv (also known as Nikolaev), which later became a large city. A 1798 source notes that the village of Larievka is governed by Stepan Ivanovich Todorovitch. It was known for its good drinking water, from wells and the Inhul. Todorovitch owned two factories, and wheat was grown in the area.

At this time, the village of Mikhaylovka still belonged to Lariy. "The village is located beside the Inhul river and Selihovaya gorge. There was plenty of water; even in summer, the river was 30 fathoms deep. Wheat, millet and hay grew well in the sandy soil, and there is a stone mill. Birds and fish are also sources of food. In addition to farm work, women weave wool fabric for clothing and crafts; what they do not use themselves, they sell."

Near Mikhaylovka was present-day Marievka, although in the late 18th century they were a single settlement. In the 1795 census, Mikhaylovka had 104 people (58 men and 46 women) in 28 households; Larievka had 119 people (72 men and 47 women). On an 1815 map, Mikhaylovka and Marievka were separate hamlets.

In the late eighteenth century and the first half of the nineteenth century, Mikhaylovka and Larievka were farther apart than they are today. In the 1859 list of settlements in the province of Kherson, Larievka was called "Baba". According to maps of the period, its position corresponds to the lowland before the rise of the hill (which people still called "Baba.") According to the 1859 census, only nine people (three men and six women) lived in Larievka (Baba) – a precipitous drop from the 1795 census. In a second, larger settlement (also called Larievka) the new landlord (whose name was Koshenbara) built an eight-meter-long bridge near a farm belonging to German settlers named Shardt. This bridge, which connects Mykhailo-Laryne and Peresadovka with its neighbors, helped the village grow to 99 inhabitants (48 men and 51 women). Mikhaylovka (also known as Greig) grew to 183 residents (90 men and 93 women) in 23 households. Local peasants still remember a settlement named Komarovka, which was Mikhaylovka on the 1815 map. An 1849 map shows present-day Lenin Street; an entrance-block of houses and a stone wall came down to the river. In 1887, there were 330 inhabitants (in 55 households) in Mikhaylovka and Larievka – one census-taking household, one business, one Jewish and 52 peasant households.

According to the 1896 census, in the villages of Mikhailovka and Larievka (also known at the time as Greeve and Blajkova) there were 47 homes and 246 residents (122 men and 124 women). In the village there was a tavern; the Larievka railway station was three miles away. The Tsherbino (now known as Greïgovo) railway station was seven miles away. In the nearby German-speaking hamlet of Douengauer, 106 residents (61 men and 45 women) lived in 18 households; it later became part of Mykhailo-Laryne. Another German-speaking hamlet, Schardt, there were 58 residents (38 men and 20 women) living in 18 households. On the Blajkov estate there were 20 residents (11 men and 9 women) in three households.

Just after the turn of the 20th century, Mikhailo-Larievka had 71 households and 418 residents (214 men and 204 women). On Mikhaylovka peasant farms were 134 horses, 2 oxen, 51 cows and 55 other animals. In Larievka there were 20 horses, 9 cows and 12 wagons. Most farmers had small plots; their holdings were:

Mikhaylovka

- 1/2 – 1 dessiatins (1 dessiatin = 2.7 acres, slightly larger than one hectare): 7 farms
- 2 dessiatins: 8 farms
- 2 – 3 dessiatins: 3 farms

Plots in Larievka were somewhat larger:

- 2 – 3 dessiatins: 1 farm
- 3 – 5 dessiatins: 1 farm
- 5 – 7 dessiatins: 4 farms

Shortly before the Revolution of 1917 a census of rural households was conducted in the district of Kherson (in which Mikhailo-Larievka was located), which found 386 people in 72 households. There were several larger estates: O.I. Bulatsel had a population of 27 and N. Schardt had 9; F. I. Douengauer had 82 people in 9 households.

According to the village register, the residents of Mikhailo-Larievka had the following surnames: Fedorenko, Kovbosha, Krasivoron, Kravshenko, Krikun, Kulikov, Lukashevitsh, Melnychenko, Natchinaylo, Nesterov, Nosenko, Novikov, Osipov, Ostapenko, Shkolyar, Taran, Tchernovol and Vassylenko. In 1863, a church dedicated to the Archangel Michael was built in the nearby village of Peresadovka; its parish register (recording baptisms, marriages and burials) from 1876 to 1917 is preserved in the state archives of the Mykolaiv region. In the early 20th century, a small Orthodox primary school existed in Mykhailo-Laryne.

=== After the Revolution ===
The Revolution of 1917 and the events which followed changed lives in the village of Mykhailo-Laryne, as it did throughout Ukraine. The former owner escaped with his life to France (where his descendants still live). The orchard and the wall separating his estate from the village was destroyed. After the Civil War the estate was converted into an orphanage, where 16 student Komsomolets organized the Joint Guardians of Illich (one of the first two in the Mykolaiv region) in 1924. The second head is the Common Council was Shalaenko Gregoire, who was killed by the Germans during World War II; a village street is named for him. Collectivization mandated by the new government resulted in the crippling of agriculture; farmers became more like employees. Large landowners were deported; many never returned.

World War II brought new suffering to the farmers. German occupation forces established a procedure for incorporating labor and conscription which preserved collective-farm occupants, and a secret police was active. Beginning in 1944, the withdrawal of German forces led to reprisals (the murder of 60 innocent civilians), and many young people were deported to Germany. When they eventually returned to the Soviet Union, they were sentenced to hard labor for "treason."

In 1951 a wave of immigrants arrived in Mikhailo-Laryne from western Ukraine, swelling the number of villagers.

In 1968 the village Farm Guardians of Illich, and a clubhouse was built. The former kolkhoz become a state farm, and vineyards were planted. In 1977, a new school (which included a kindergarten) opened; by then, most of the 200-year-old estate had disappeared.

The dissolution of the Soviet Union at the end of the 20th century led to a decrease in the population of Mykhailo-Laryne. The collapse of the economy left its mark on all aspects of village life. The kindergarten was closed, and there was a corresponding decline in village infrastructure; only in recent years has there been a small recovery in village life. Since 1991 Mikhailo-Laryne has had its own post office, and a number of stores have opened since then. There is a pharmacy and various social groups; the kindergarten is planned to reopen.

On June 1, 2006, the Mykhailo-Laryne had a population of 1869 inhabitants in 649 households; there were 210 students in the high school. On April 1, 2007, the village had 1918 inhabitants.

Until 18 July 2020, Mykhailo-Laryne belonged to Vitovka Raion. The raion was abolished in July 2020 as part of the administrative reform of Ukraine, which reduced the number of raions of Mykolaiv Oblast to four. The area of Vitovka Raion was merged into Mykolaiv Raion.

== Literature ==
- Loboda V.V. Toponymy of Dnipro-Buzko interfluve. - Kiyiv, 1976. - p. 130.
- Nikolaev region. Local lore collector. - Nikolaev, 1926. - p. 205.
- RGADA (Russian State Archive of Ancient Acts), f. 1355, inv. 1, fail 2066, leaves 59-59 reverse.
- Kherson Gubernia. List of localities according to the 1859 - S.-P., 1868. - No. 88-90.
- Materials for land evaluation of Kherson gubernia, v. 6: Kherson district. - Kherson, 1890. Application. - p. 194.
- List of settlements in Kherson gubernia. - Kherson, 1896. - p. 395-397.
- Data on the economic situation of the villages ... the Kherson district in 1906–1907. - Kherson, 1908. - pp. 6–7.
- Lenіn's tribe. April 7, 1984.
- Atrocities of the Nazis: the documents. - M., 1945. - p. 65.
- Experience of Mykhailo-Laryne village council. - Mykhailo-Laryne, 2006. - p. 2.
