= Lityn =

Rural locality in Vinnytsia Oblast, Ukraine

Lityn Літин
- Rural settlement
- Location within Vinnytsia Oblast Location within Ukraine
- Coordinates: 49°19′30″N 28°04′50″E
- Country: Ukraine
- Oblast: Vinnytsia Oblast
- Raion: Vinnytsia Raion
- Time zone: UTC+2 (EET)
  - Summer (DST): UTC+3 (EEST)

Lityn (Ukrainian: Літин) is a rural settlement in Vinnytsia Oblast (province), located in the historic region of the Podilia. It was formerly the administrative center of the Lityn Raion, but is now administered within Vinnytsia Raion. Population: 6,547 (2022 estimate)

== Name ==
In addition to the Ukrainian name Літин, it is also known in Polish as Lityń.

== Location ==
The town is located near the Zghar River which is a left tributary of the Southern Bug. Lityn is situated 28 kilometers to the North-West of Vinnytsia on one of the most frequently used roads for connecting Ukraine and the EU roads - European route E50.

== History ==
The date of the foundation of the town is not known. The oldest mention of it is in the edict of Duke of Podilia Fyodor Koriatovych of 1391. Since 1566 Lityn was a royal city located in the Bracław Voivodeship of Poland. After the Second Partition of Poland in 1793 it was annexed by the Russian Empire. Since 1797 Lityn was a county seat of the Russian Podolia Governorate. Folk hero Ustym Karmaliuk was imprisoned here; the prison where he was detained is now a part of the museum named after Karmaliuk, which is situated in Lityn.

In 1897 almost half of population of Lityn was practicing Judaism. Since March 1923, Lityn was a center of the Lityn Raion.

On the eve of World War II, there were 1,410 Jews living in the city. Between July 17, 1941, and March 20, 1944, the town was occupied by the Nazi Germany. On August 20, 1941, 56 young Jews were murdered. On December 19, 1941, about 1,800 Jews (including residents from surrounding areas) were shot at the nearby military base.

The remaining Jews were transferred into the ghetto . The ghetto consisted of a few houses on two narrow streets. Around 300 Jews were concentrated inside the ghetto, which was surrounded by a fence. The prisoners were prohibited from leaving and threatened with shooting if they tried. Although food was scarce and hunger severe, nobody was allowed to go to the peasant market to obtain food.

In the middle of April 1942, a limited shooting of skilled workmen took place.

A labor prison camp was organized on the grounds of the military base in Litin, into which the Nazis resettled Romanian Jews, mostly from Bukovina. The purpose of the camp was to provide labor for the construction in 1942 of Transit Highway Durchgangsstrasse IV from Poland to the North Caucasus.In September 1942, the Germans liquidated the labor prison camp. On September 12, 580 people were shot, and on September 20 and 26 (by varying accounts), the remaining 520 people were killed.

According to different sources, about 3,353-4,000 Jews were murdered in Lityn. The anti-Jewish actions were carried out by German gendarmeria, accompanied by Ukrainian auxiliary police and a special SD commando. Some Jews from Lityn survived the war because they were deported to the Zhmerynka ghetto which remained under Romanian occupation.

Until 26 January 2024, Lityn was designated urban-type settlement. On this day, a new law entered into force which abolished this status, and Lityn became a rural settlement.

== Population ==
=== Language ===
Distribution of the population by native language according to the 2001 census:

| Language | Percentage |
|---|---|
| Ukrainian | 95.4% |
| Russian | 4.3% |
| other/undecided | 0.3% |

== Infrastructure ==
The Lityn's biggest taxpayer and employer is Litynskiy Milk Factory, which proceed up to 300 tons of milk and where a few hundreds of citizens are employed.
There is a number of other important institutions that include two schools, four libraries, two bazaars, regional hospital, cinema, stadium, one of the biggest in the oblast sport hall, a medium-security prison, and agricultural factories. The factories proceed and produce meat, bread, vegetables, wood etc.

== Notable people ==
- Ustym Karmaliuk was a Ukrainian peasant outlaw who became a folk hero. He is one of the most known Ukrainians who fought against serfage and often referred to as the "Ukrainian Robin Hood" and "the last Haydamak". He was born in 1787 in Lityn Region. There is the Ustym Karmeliuk's museum in Lityn.
- David Bert'ie was a professor of Art and famous Soviet musical conductor who was born in Lityn in 1882.
- Yakiv Shepel' was a regional leader of the insurrection against bolsheviks in 1919–1921 as a member of the Ukrainian People's Army.
- Mykola Bytynskiy was a famous Ukrainian artist, heraldist, vexillologist, and poet.
- Sergiy Sobko is a soldier who fought in the War in Donbas and became a Hero of Ukraine was born in Lityn in 1984.
