= Lityn Raion =

Former subdivision of Vinnytsia Oblast, Ukraine

Coordinates: 49°19′38″N 28°05′00″E

Lityn Raion Літинський район
- Raion
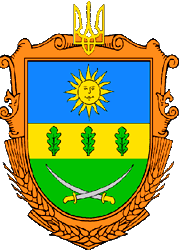
- Flag Coat of arms

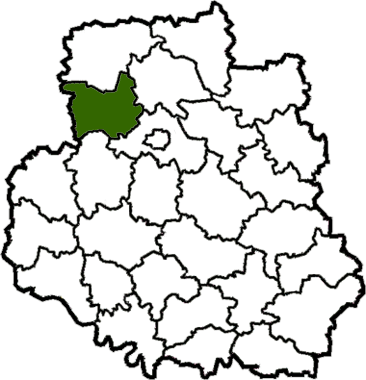
- Country: Ukraine
- Oblast: Vinnytsia Oblast
- Established: 1923
- Disestablished: 18 July 2020
- Admin. center: Lityn
- Subdivisions: List: 0 — city councils; 1 — settlement councils; 21 — rural councils; Number of localities: 0 — cities; 1 — urban-type settlements; 59 — villages; — rural settlements

Government
  - Governor: Volodymyr Hymychuk

Area
  - Total: 960 km^{2} (370 sq mi)

Population (2020)
  - Total: 33,691 ▼
  - Density: 35/km^{2} (91/sq mi)
- Time zone: UTC+02:00 (EET)
  - Summer (DST): UTC+03:00 (EEST)
- Postal index: 22300—22364
- Area code: +380 4347
- Website: https://web.archive.org/web/20140222054336/http://litin-rda.gov.ua/

Lityn Raion (Ukrainian: Літинський район) was one of raions of Vinnytsia Oblast, located in southwestern Ukraine. The administrative center of the raion was the urban-type settlement of Lityn. The raion was abolished and its territory was merged into Vinnytsia Raion on 18 July 2020 as part of the administrative reform of Ukraine, which reduced the number of raions of Vinnytsia Oblast to six. The last estimate of the raion population was 33,691 (2020 est.).
