= Dobrianka, Beryslav Raion, Kherson Oblast =

Village in Kherson Oblast, Ukraine

Dobrianka Добрянка
- Village
- Interactive map of Dobrianka
- Location of Dobryanka within Ukraine Dobrianka (Ukraine)
- Coordinates: 47.462778°N 33.622222°E
- Country: Ukraine
- Oblast: Kherson Oblast
- Raion: Beryslav Raion
- Hromada: Vysokopillia settlement hromada
- Founded: before 1932

Area
  - Total: 0.887 km^{2} (0.342 sq mi)
- Elevation: 87 m (285 ft)

Population (2001 census)
  - Total: 138
  - Density: 156/km^{2} (403/sq mi)
- Time zone: UTC+2 (EET)
  - Summer (DST): UTC+3 (EEST)
- Postal code: 74042
- Area code: +380 5535

Dobrianka (Ukrainian: Добрянка; Russian: Добрянка) is a village in Beryslav Raion, Kherson Oblast, southern Ukraine, about 125.3 kilometres (77.9 mi) northeast from the centre of Kherson city. It is part of the Vysokopillia hromada, one of the hromadas of Ukraine. The village has an area of 0.887 km2, with a total population according to the 2001 Ukrainian census, the last official post-independence census, of 138 people.

== History ==
The village was formally known as Chubarovka during early Soviet times and, until 1958, was known as Ukrainka. During the Great Patriotic War, the village was occupied by German troops from 20 August 1941 to 20 February 1944, before being recaptured by Soviet troops.

On 19 July 2020, as a result of administrative-territorial reform and the liquidation of the Vysokopillia Raion, the village was incorporated into the Beryslav Raion. Previously, on 12 June 2020, the village became part of the Vysokopillia hromada in accordance with Order no. 726 of the Cabinet of Ministers of Ukraine.

The village came under attack by Russian forces in 2022, during the Russian invasion of Ukraine. In July 2022, the Operation Command South reported that ten Russian soldiers tried to break through the barrier line near Dobrianka and recapture the village, but five of the soldiers were killed.

== Demographics ==
The settlement had 138 inhabitants in 2001. The native language distribution as of the Ukrainian Census of 2001 was:

- Ukrainian: 97.32%
- Russian: 2.68%

== Monuments ==
In 2008 a memorial sign to the victims of the Holodomor from 1932 to 1933 was erected.
