= Ocheretuvate, Samar Raion, Dnipropetrovsk Oblast =

Village in Mahdalynivka Raion, Dnipropetrovsk Oblast, Ukraine

Coordinates: 48.7208°N 35.0081°E

Ocheretuvate (Ukrainian: Очеретувате) is a village in Mahdalynivka Raion, Dnipropetrovsk Oblast, Ukraine.
