= Slobozhanske, Berestyn Raion, Kharkiv Oblast =

Rural locality in Kharkiv Oblast, Ukraine

Slobozhanske Слобожанське
- Rural settlement
- Slobozhanske Local History Museum

- Location in Kharkiv Oblast Location in Ukraine
- Coordinates: 49°22′05″N 35°52′09″E
- Country: Ukraine
- Oblast: Kharkiv Oblast
- Raion: Berestyn Raion
- Hromada: Kehychivka settlement hromada

Population (2022)
  - Total: 2,605
- Time zone: UTC+2 (EET)
  - Summer (DST): UTC+3 (EEST)

Slobozhanske (Ukrainian: Слобожанське, Russian: Слобожанское) is a rural settlement in Berestyn Raion of Kharkiv Oblast in Ukraine. It is located in the middle of the steppe, approximately 25 kilometres (16 mi) from Berestyn. Slobozhanske belongs to Kehychivka settlement hromada, one of the hromadas of Ukraine. Population: 2,605 (2022 estimate).

The settlement was called Chapaieve until 2016, in honour of Vasily Chapayev. On 5 February 2016, Verkhovna Rada adopted decision to rename Chapaieve to Slobozhanske according to the law prohibiting names of Communist origin.

== History ==
Until 18 July 2020, Slobozhanske belonged to Kehychivka Raion. The raion was abolished in July 2020 as part of the administrative reform of Ukraine, which reduced the number of raions of Kharkiv Oblast to seven. The area of Kechyhivka Raion was merged into Krasnohrad Raion.

Until 26 January 2024, Slobozhanske was designated urban-type settlement. On this day, a new law entered into force which abolished this status, and Slobozhanske became a rural settlement.

== Economy ==
=== Transportation ===
Slobozhanske is connected with Kehychivka by a railroad, but this is a cargo line without any passenger traffic. The closest station with passenger navigation is in Kehychivka.

The settlement is connected by road with Kehychivka in the south and Nova Vodolaha in the north.
