= Sakhnovshchyna =

Rural locality in Kharkiv Oblast, Ukraine

Sakhnovshchyna Сахновщина
- Rural settlement
- Location within Ukraine Location within Kharkiv Oblast
- Coordinates: 49°9′0″N 35°52′24″E
- Country: Ukraine
- Oblast: Kharkiv Oblast
- Raion: Berestyn Raion
- Hromada: Sakhnovshchyna settlement hromada

Population (2022)
  - Total: 6,900
- Time zone: UTC+2 (EET)
  - Summer (DST): UTC+3 (EEST)

Sakhnovshchyna (Ukrainian and Russian: Сахновщина) is a rural settlement in Berestyn Raion, Kharkiv Oblast, Ukraine. It hosts the administration of Sakhnovshchyna settlement hromada, one of the hromadas of Ukraine. Population: 6,900 (2022 estimate).

== History ==
It was a village in Kharkov Governorate of the Russian Empire.

A local newspaper is published here since December 1930. Urban-type settlement since October 1938.

During World War II it was under German occupation from October 1941 to September 1943. A Nazi concentration camp was established here.

In January 1989 the population was 9945 people. In January 2013 the population was 7571 people.

Until 18 July 2020, Sakhnovshchyna was the administrative center of Sakhnovshchyna Raion. The raion was abolished in July 2020 as part of the administrative reform of Ukraine, which reduced the number of raions of Kharkiv Oblast to seven. The area of Sakhnovshchyna Raion was merged into Krasnohrad Raion, which was later renamed Berestyn Raion.

Until 26 January 2024, Sakhnovshchyna was designated urban-type settlement. On this day, a new law entered into force which abolished this status, and Sakhnovshchyna became a rural settlement.

== Economy ==
=== Transportation ===
Sakhnovshchyna is on a road connecting Berestyn and Izium. Another road to Kehychivka branches off north.

Sakhnovshchyna railway station is on a railway connecting Krasnohrad and Lozova. Via both ends of the line it has access to Kharkiv.
