= Nova Vodolaha =

Rural locality in Kharkiv Oblast, Ukraine

Nova Vodolaha Нова Водолага
- Rural settlement
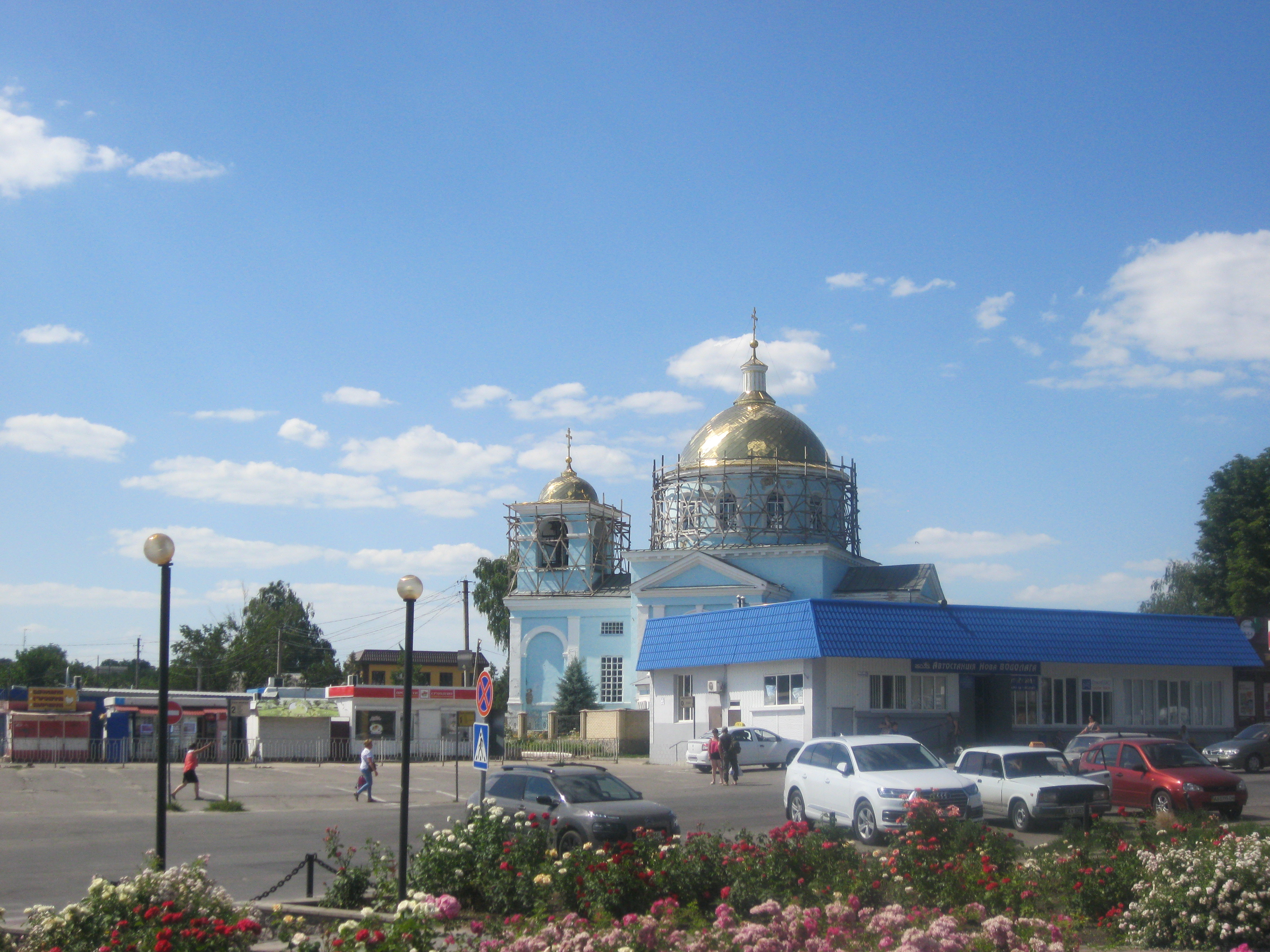

- Flag Seal

- Location within Ukraine Location within Kharkiv Oblast
- Coordinates: 49°43′09″N 35°52′34″E
- Country: Ukraine
- Oblast: Kharkiv Oblast
- Raion: Kharkiv Raion

Population (2022)
  - Total: 10,455
- Time zone: UTC+2 (EET)
  - Summer (DST): UTC+3 (EEST)

Nova Vodolaha (Ukrainian: Нова Водолага, Russian: Новая Водолага) is a rural settlement in Kharkiv Raion, Kharkiv Oblast, Ukraine. It hosts the administration of Nova Vodolaha settlement hromada, one of the hromadas of Ukraine. Population: 10,455 (2022 estimate).

Nova Vodolaha is located in the banks of the Olkhovatka River, a short right tributary of the Mzha River in the drainage basin of the Donets.

== History ==
It started as a village in Valky uyezd of Kharkov Governorate of the Russian Empire.

A local newspaper is published here since December 1931. Urban-type settlement since October 1938.

During World War II it was under German occupation from October 1941 to September 1943.

In January 1989 the population was 14 979 people. In January 2013 the population was 13 583 people.

Until 18 July 2020, Nova Vodolaha was the administrative center of Nova Vodolaha Raion. The raion was abolished in July 2020 as part of the administrative reform of Ukraine, which reduced the number of raions of Kharkiv Oblast to seven. The area of Nova Vodolaha Raion was split between Kharkiv and Krasnohrad Raions, with Nova Vodolaha municipality being transferred to Kharkiv Raion.

Until 26 January 2024, Nova Vodolaha was designated urban-type settlement. On this day, a new law entered into force which abolished this status, and Nova Vodolaha became a rural settlement.

On 19 October 2026, a Russian drone struck the town's central park, killing six people, including three children.

== Economy ==
=== Transportation ===
Nova Vodolaha is on the Highway M29 which connects Kharkiv and Dnipro. North of the settlement the Highway M18 branches off east to Kharkiv.

Vodolaha railway station, located here, is on the railway connecting Kharkiv (via Merefa) and Dnipro (via Krasnohrad).

== Demographics ==
As of the 2001 Ukrainian census, the settlement had a population of 13,538 inhabitants. The linguistic composition of the population was as follows:

Native languages in Nova Vodolaha
	percent
Ukrainian	90.6%
Russian	9.0%
Belarusian	0.1%
others	0.3%
