= Bohorodytska Fortress =

Fort in Samar, Dnipro (Ukraine)

- Богородицька фортеця
- Samar, Dnipro in Ukraine
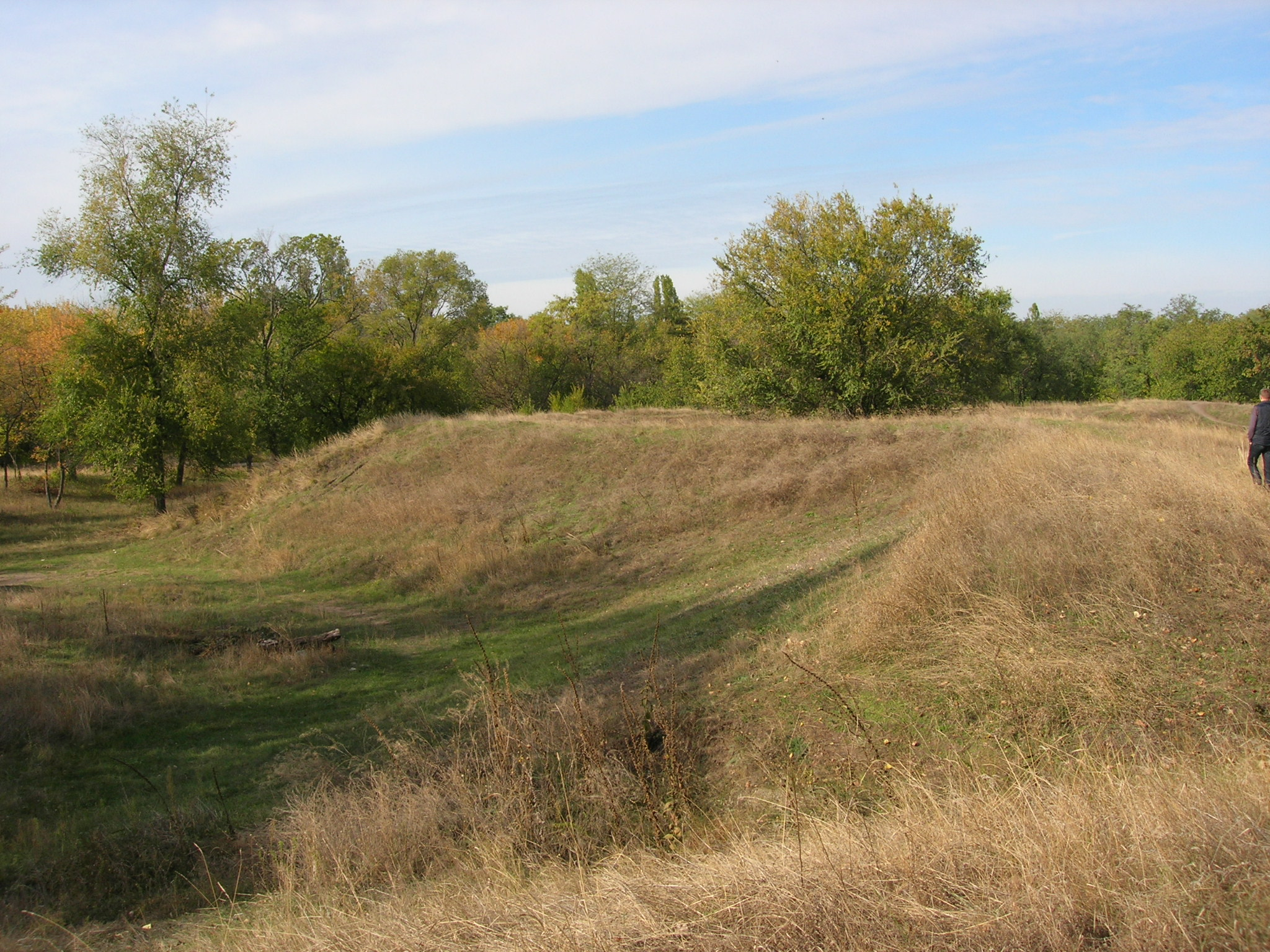
- Remnant of a rampart in 2010

Site information
- Open to the public: Yes

Location
- Coordinates: 48°30′03″N 35°09′48″E
- Area: 10 ha (25 acres)

Site history
- Built: 22 July [O.S. 12] 1687
- Built by: William von Zalen
- In use: 1687–1711; 1731–1783
- Materials: Wood
- Fate: Dismantled, archeological site
- Battles/wars: 1689 Crimean campaign; Bulavin Rebellion; Pylyp Orlyk's March on the Right-bank Ukraine; Russo-Turkish War (1735–1739)

Garrison information
- Garrison: Cossack Hetmanate

Immovable Monument of National Significance of Ukraine
- Official name: Новобогородицька фортеця (Novobohorodytska Fortress)
- Type: History
- Reference no.: 040004-Н

The Bohorodytska Fortress (Ukrainian: Богородицька фортеця, romanized: Theotokos Fortress) or Novobohorodytska Fortress ('New Theotokos fortress') is a 17th-century retrenchment of the Cossack Hetmanate on the right bank of the Samara River. During the Russian Empire's battle for access to the Black and Azov Seas, as well as the new Zaporizhzhia subordinate, the fort became a crucial outpost. According to contemporary experts, the fortress has a far longer history because it was built where the old Cossack town of Samar formerly stood rather than starting from scratch.

== Design ==
The primary elements used for reinforcement were wood and earth: a 4 metres (13 ft) shaft, a wide and deep ditch measuring 6 × 3 meters, and a palisade including 17 cannons. A wooden chapel was named after the Intercession of the Most Holy Theotokos, was erected inside its rectangular layout on 23 April 1688. Its state garrison was supposed to include 4,491 troops, spearmen, and reiters, not including various officers, there were only 4,014 individuals. The fort covered an area of about 10 hectares (25 acres) and had a perimeter of over 1,300 metres (4,300 ft). They were positioned and fortified around the citadel with a 3500 m-long moat and rampart. Additionally, bridges made from nadolbs and wooden piles were constructed. The stronghold is referred to as a marvel of Ukrainian fortification art because of its unique design, which makes it resemble a turtle when viewed from above.

== History ==
Two fortresses were constructed in the same area, according to the surviving documents and evidence of the period. The first was named Bohorodytska (Novobohorodytska) Fortress, and the second was named Novosergievskaya. They were both designed and constructed by William von Zalen, a foreign engineer-colonel who worked for the Moscow government. On the right bank of the Samara River, Bohorodytska Fortress began construction on 22 July [O.S. 12] 1687 by the orders of Dmitry Golitsyn. A garrison of 500 soldiers was stationed and where the remnants of the ramparts are still partially preserved. Early August 1688 saw the completion of the work, which had started in the spring in March.

The Bohorodytska Fortress was designated as a base for Russian soldiers fighting the Crimean Khanate, a tool of Moscow's power over the seized land, and a warning to the erratic Cossacks. Hetman Ivan Mazepa assembled his troops, accompanied them to the town of Goltva, and dispatched a separate corps to defend the citadel in response to the prospect of an invasion by the Crimean Khan Selim I Giray on the territories of Ukraine in the winter of 1690.

A disease struck Zaporozhye in early April of that year and persisted throughout the summer. The officers and the bulk of the soldiers at the fort perished or escaped to the nearby countryside, and half of the nearby city burned down. After learning of this, the Hetman gave the order to replace them with the same number of Cossacks from the Myrhorod regiment and to dispatch 1,000 Cossacks from the Poltava regiment to guard the citadel and the tsarist treasure.

The citadel was essentially reconstructed in 1691 when Petro Ivanenko, his Cossacks, and 500 Tatars attempted to take it on 31 July 1692. The Cossacks and Tatars advanced on the lower city, taking numerous courtyards and two towers on fire while capturing a number of hives and a hundred sheep. However, at this point, the garrison of the citadel opened fire on them with guns, forcing them to withdraw.

During the Bulavin Rebellion in 1708, the Cossacks and Kondraty Bulavin followers failed to storm the fortification. Khan Selim II Giray assaulted the fort in 1711, and later the Treaty of the Pruth with Turkey destroyed it. Under the direct supervision of Hetman, the governor general of Kyiv, and with the presence of Pasha, the Turkish representative, the fort was demolished in September. The stronghold was rebuilt by General Count von Weisbach after 1731 and was known as the Samara Retrenchment in 1736. Following restoration, the fortress's perimeter was expanded to 17,000 metres (56,000 ft). During Russia's battle with the Crimean Horde in 1735–1739, the defenses were included into the Ukrainian line.

By royal proclamation of Catherine II, Novorossiya's fortresses were completely decommissioned in 1783. The Intercession Church, which was housed in the citadel, was disassembled and moved to the settlement of Odinkovka, which was situated on the other side of the Samara River, in 1798. The city's and the fortress's existence is over. Since then, German colonists have tilled the ground on the site of the ancient fortification, using it for the gardens of the Shevchenko village's citizens.

By a decision passed by the Cabinet of Ministers in 2001, the Bohorodytska Fortress was designated as a historically significant monument of national significance. On the grounds of Samara, archeological excavations started in the same year. In the 1,686 square metres (18,150 sq ft) of the examined area, almost 10,000 items were found. Funding is scarce, thus archeological study is done sporadically. The monument has not yet been a part of any local or regional initiatives.

A list of antiquities, which comprised 2,200 findings on the fortress grounds, was released by scientists as early as 2007. The inventory and subsequent discoveries of seals, trade seals, pear crosses, buttons from garments, plates, and other domestic goods, jewelry, money from the 14th–18th centuries, weapons and other artifacts attested to the settlement's antiquity on the margins of the Bohorodytska Fortress. On the site of the stronghold, there are presently archeological digs and Cossack festivities.

From 24 to 25 August 2018 is when the Samar Dnipro Fest, an event that blends historical recreation, a medieval competition, and a music performance, takes place at the Bohorodytska Fortress.

== See also ==
- Borysohlibska Fortress
