= Zachepylivka =

Rural locality in Kharkiv Oblast, Ukraine

Zachepylivka Зачепилівка
- Rural settlement
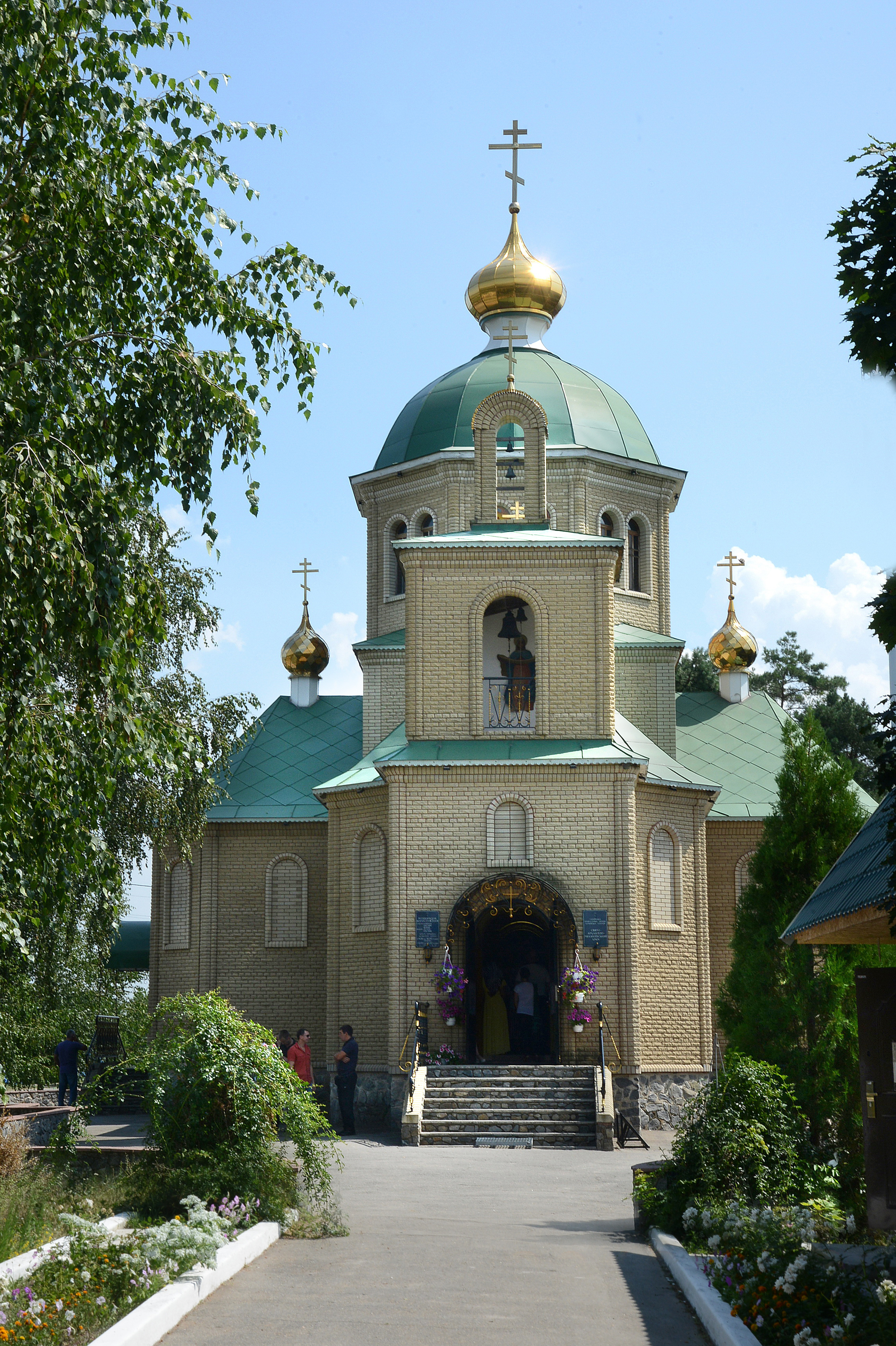
- Church of Michael the Archangel in Zachepylivka

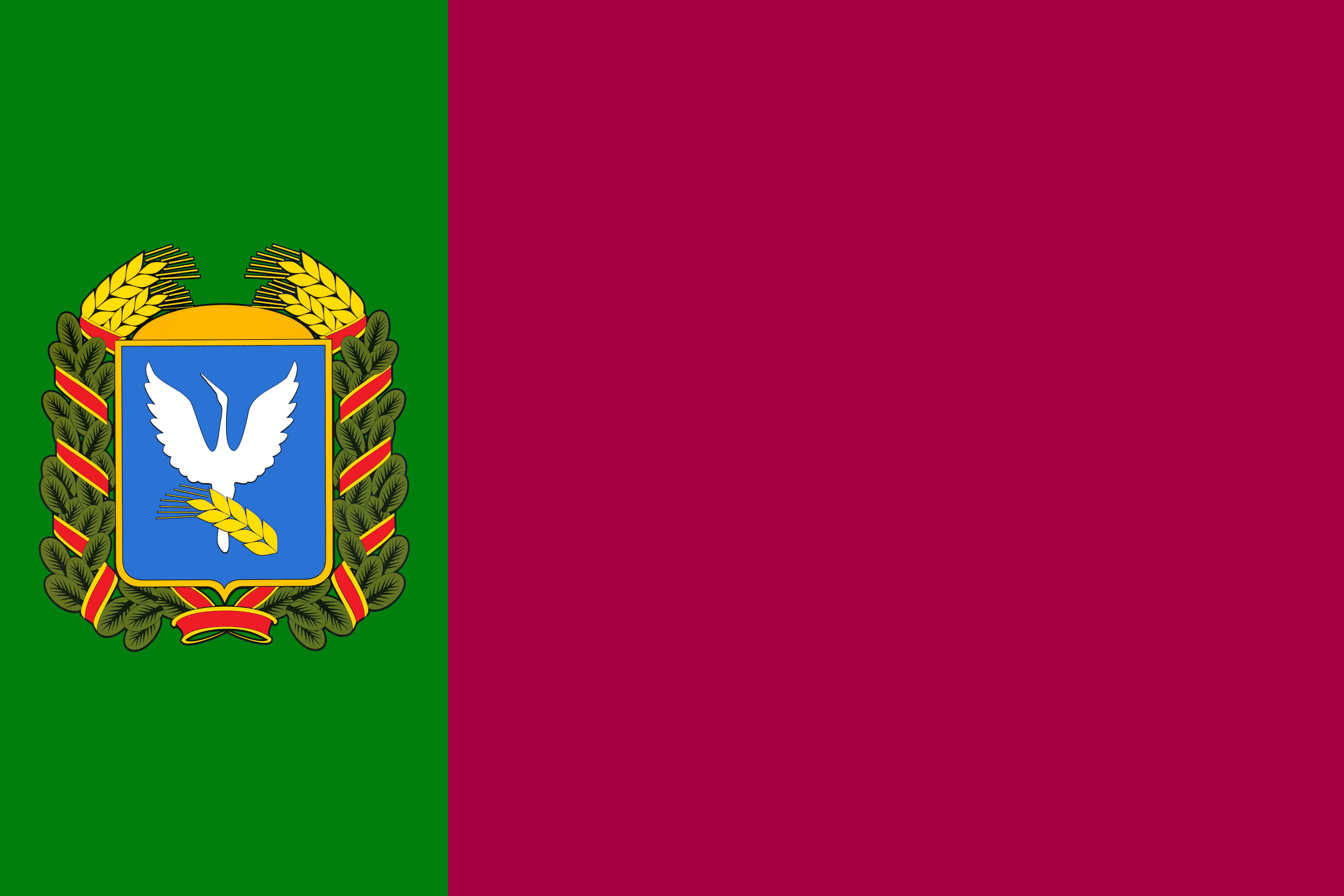
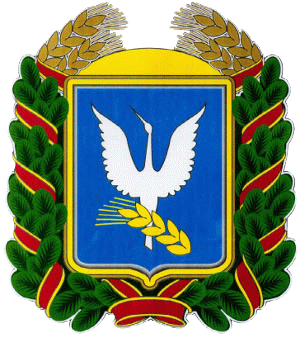
- Flag Coat of arms

- Location within Ukraine Location within Kharkiv Oblast
- Coordinates: 49°11′47″N 35°14′42″E
- Country: Ukraine
- Oblast: Kharkiv Oblast
- Raion: Berestyn Raion

Population (2022)
  - Total: 3,317
- Time zone: UTC+2 (EET)
  - Summer (DST): UTC+3 (EEST)

Zachepylivka (Ukrainian: Зачепилівка, [zɐtʃeˈpɪl⁽ʲ⁾iu̯kɐ]; Russian: Зачепиловка) is a rural settlement in Berestyn Raion, Kharkiv Oblast, Ukraine. It hosts the administration of Zachepylivka settlement hromada, one of the hromadas of Ukraine. Population: 3,317 (2022 estimate), 3,101 (2024 estimate).

Zachepylivka lies in the southeastern part of Dnieper Lowland. It is located on the left bank of the Berestova river, close to its mouth. The Berestova is a right tributary of the Oril, a major left tributary of the Dnieper.

== History ==
It was a village in Konstantinigrad uyezd of Poltava Governorate of the Russian Empire.

A local newspaper was published there since 1933. In 1968 Zachepylivka became an urban-type settlement.

In January 1989 the population was 5,130 people. By January 2013 it had decreased to 3,753 people.

Until 18 July 2020, Zachepylivka was the administrative center of Zachepylivka Raion. The raion was abolished in July 2020 as part of the administrative reform of Ukraine, which reduced the number of raions of Kharkiv Oblast to seven. The area of Zachepylivka Raion was merged into Krasnohrad Raion.

Until 26 January 2024, Zachepylivka was designated urban-type settlement. On this day, a new law entered into force which abolished this status, and Zachepylivka became a rural settlement.

== Economy ==
=== Transportation ===
Zachepylivka has access to the Highway M29 which connects Kharkiv and Dnipro. There are local roads as well.

Zachepivka railway station is located not in Zachepylivka but in the settlement of Nahirne, across the river west of Zachepylivka. It has train connections to Berestyn and Dnipro.
