= Borysohlibska Fortress =

Fortress in Ukraine built 1731–1739

Coordinates: 48°30′52″N 34°56′22″E

The Borysohlibska Fortress was built between about 1731–1739 as one of the forts of the Ukrainian line. It is located on the right bank of the river Oril at a distance of 117 fathoms (about 250 meters) from the Dnipro River.

The fortress ramparts and ditches have not been brought into a complete project profile. Small 5 bastions and 2 ravelins are directed toward the river, which formed the stellate outline building. The main gate of the ditch led the bridge. Inside the barracks were placed garrisons, a house commandant powder keg, storeroom, refreshment shop, well, and a little chamber. The next settlement of the Borysohlibskyi regiment formed with respective residential, public and commercial buildings. The Borysohlibska Fortress was abolished in 1784. The area was flooded by the Dniprodzerzhynsk Hydroelectric Power Plant in 1962.

== See also ==
- Bohorodytska Fortress
