= Borys Oliynyk (poet) =

Ukrainian writer and politician (1935–2017)

Hero of Ukraine Borys Oliynyk
- Борис Олійник
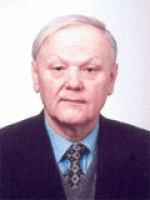
- Official Verkhovna Rada portrait, 2002

People's Deputy of Ukraine
- In office 14 December 1992 – 25 May 2006
- Preceded by: Position established
- Succeeded by: Constituency abolished (1998)
- Constituency: Zaporizhzhia Oblast, Zaporizhzhia (1992–1998); Communist Party of Ukraine, No. 4 (1998–2006)

People's Deputy of the UkrSSR
- In office 1980–1992
- Preceded by: Position established
- Succeeded by: Position abolished

Personal details
- Born: 22 October 1935 Zachepylivka, Ukrainian SSR, Soviet Union
- Died: 30 April 2017 (aged 81) Kyiv, Ukraine
- Party: Communist Party of Ukraine (1993–2005)
- Other political affiliations: Communist Party of the Soviet Union; People's Movement of Ukraine; Socialist Party of Ukraine
- Education: Taras Shevchenko University of Kyiv

Borys Illich Oliynyk (Ukrainian: Борис Ілліч Олійник; Russian: Борис Ильич Олейник, romanized: Boris Ilyich Oleynik; 22 October 1935 – 30 April 2017) was a Soviet and Ukrainian writer and politician who was a People's Deputy of Ukraine from 1990 to 2006. Oliynyk was one of the leaders of the People's Movement of Ukraine and later a founder of the Communist Party of Ukraine.

== Early life and career ==
Borys Illich Oliynyk was born on 22 October 1935 in the village of Zachepylivka, in Ukraine's eastern Kharkiv Oblast. His father, Illia Oliynyk, was a journalist, and was working in Ternopil Oblast when Operation Barbarossa began in 1941. He was killed in action in 1943. Oliinyk later recalled that he had been taken as a prisoner alongside his mother, but that his blonde hair prevented them from being executed after his mother was mistaken for being Polish.

Oliinyk graduated from secondary education in 1953 and began studying at Taras Shevchenko University of Kyiv's faculty of journalism that year. He graduated in 1958, becoming a journalist at Molod Ukrayiny after his graduation.

== Literary career ==
Oliynyk's literary career began in 1948, while he was still studying at Novi Sanzhary Secondary School. In his fifth year of school his poetry began being published in the local newspaper; he would later contribute articles and essays to the paper as a senior student. While studying at the University of Kyiv, he was part of the Sixtiers. He became a close acquaintance of several other young Ukrainian writers at this time, among them Vasyl Symonenko.

Oliynyk became a member of the Writers' Union of Ukraine in 1963, and was its deputy chairman between 1971 and 1974. He was also a secretary of the board at the Writers' Union of Ukraine from 1971 to 1974 and at the Union of Soviet Writers from 1976 to 1991. Between 1962 and 1968 he published eight poetry collections, followed by a ninth, The Truth, in 1976. During his lifetime, he published a total of fifty works, including poetry collections and books on history, literature, journalism and literary criticism. He was also an editor at three journals (Ranok, Vitchyzna and Dnipro). Oliynyk was also head of the branch of the Communist Party of the Soviet Union within the Writers' Union of Ukraine for eleven years. He noted as an achievement that no member of the Writers' Union was imprisoned or expelled during his tenure.

Oliynyk became a member of the National Academy of Sciences of Ukraine in 2017. He was at one time the head of the nominating committee for the Shevchenko National Prize.

== Political career ==
From 1976, Oliynyk was a member of the Central Committee of the Communist Party of the Ukrainian SSR and the Central Committee of the Communist Party of the Soviet Union and a deputy of the Supreme Soviet of the Ukrainian Soviet Socialist Republic. He was head of the Supreme Soviet Commission on Education and Culture. Oliynyk was subject to pressure from the KGB during the 1970s, though First Secretary Volodymyr Shcherbytsky intervened to prevent his arrest. Oliynyk was among the first politicians to visit the site of the Chernobyl disaster.

Oliynyk was present at the 19th All-Union Conference of the Communist Party of the Soviet Union in 1988, where he became among the first to publicly call for an investigation into the causes of the Holodomor. Bohdan Hawrylyshyn later said that a speech by Oliynyk in June or July 1988 that "our sisters, our mothers did not give their lives for Stalin. They gave their lives for our country, Batkivchshyna, and our country is Ukraine" as furthering his interests in Ukrainian nationalism. Oliynyk was a founding member of the People's Movement of Ukraine, representing the Writers' Union at the organisation's First Congress.

Oliynyk became a People's Deputy of Ukraine on 14 December 1992 following a by-election, representing the city of Zaporizhzhia. He was a member of the parliamentary group "For Social Justice" and the Socialist Party of Ukraine, serving as secretary of the SPU's Kyiv municipal party organisation. He had previously been a member of the Congress of People's Deputies of the Soviet Union. He was re-elected in the 1994 Ukrainian parliamentary election, joining the faction of the Communist Party of Ukraine (Ukrainian: Комуністична партія України, romanized: Komunistychna partiia Ukrainy, abbreviated KPU), and was head of the Foreign Affairs and CIS Relation Committee until February 2000. He was later elected as the fourth candidate on the proportional list of the KPU in the 1998 and 2002 Ukrainian parliamentary elections.

Oliynyk was a member of Ukraine's inaugural delegation to the Parliamentary Assembly of the Council of Europe, and was a vice president of PACE from February 1998. Following the dissolution of the Soviet Union, he observed several military conflicts in the former Soviet Union, as well as the Yugoslav Wars; he repeatedly expressed support for Serbian forces in the Bosnian War and protested against international sanctions against Serbia and Montenegro. He was in Serbia during the 1999 NATO bombing of Yugoslavia.

Oliynyk was awarded the title of Hero of Ukraine by President Viktor Yushchenko in 2005. This, along with Oliynyk's prior support for the Orange Revolution, led to him being expelled from the KPU. Oliynyk later described Yushchenko as his favourite president in an interview shortly before his death, and criticised Viktor Yanukovych as the worst among Ukraine's presidents, though he expressed sympathy for his lower-class background.

In the final years of his life, Oliynyk was the most prominent representative of national communism within the KPU. Oliynyk's beliefs in national communism were generally fringe, with his advocacy of the KPU as "a party of Ukrainian statehood" being poorly received in comparison to the policies of Soviet patriotism pushed by party leader Petro Symonenko. Oliynyk, like many other members of the KPU, supported Pan-Slavism, believing that Russians and Ukrainians together constitute an Orthodox civilisation existing separately from liberal Western European and Islamic civilisations. He was skeptical of Ukrainian integration with Europe, arguing that it was impossible for Ukraine to "return" to Europe because it had never ceased to be a part of it. Oliynyk opposed the Decommunization in Ukraine and refused to condemn Russian authorities for the annexation of Crimea and involvement of Russian separatist forces during the War in Donbas, claiming the return of Crimea to Ukraine to be unrealistic and calling for a mutual ceasefire.

== Death ==
Oliynyk died in Kyiv at 11:45 on 30 April 2017, after what journalist Mykhailo Maslii described as a "serious and prolonged illness". President Petro Poroshenko celebrated Oliynyk following his death, saying that Ukrainian culture had suffered an "irreperable loss".
