= Zachepylivka Raion =

Former subdivision of Kharkiv Oblast, Ukraine

Zachepylivka Raion Зачепилівський район
- Raion
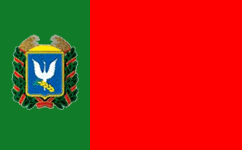
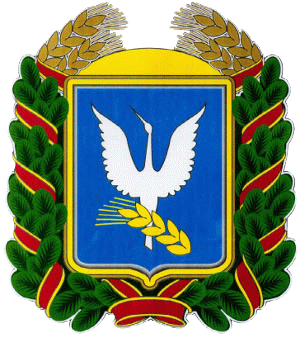
- Flag Coat of arms

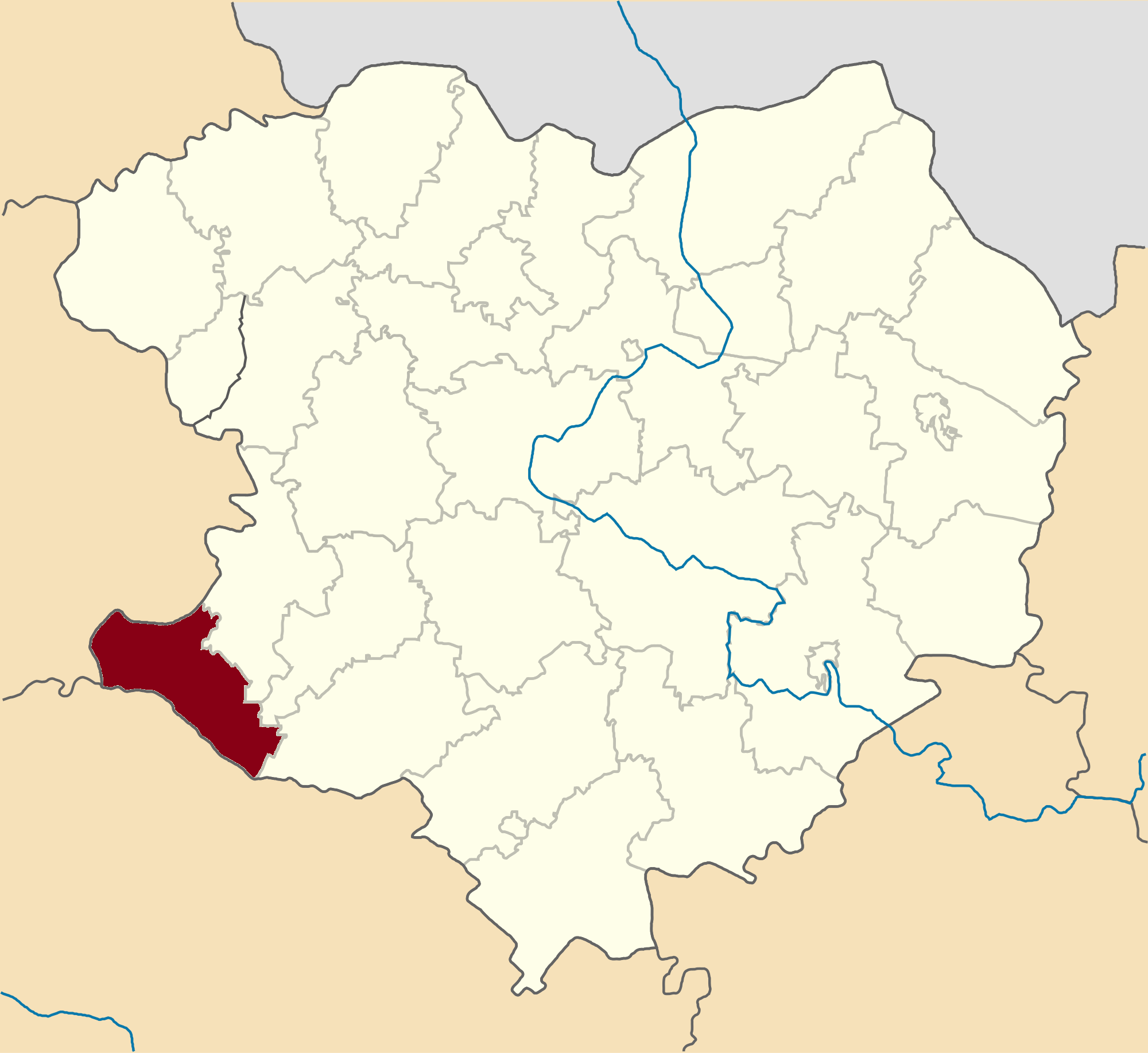
- Raion location in Kharkiv Oblast
- Coordinates: 49°10′37.7286″N 35°16′44.94″E
- Country: Ukraine
- Oblast: Kharkiv Oblast
- Disestablished: 18 July 2020
- Admin. center: Zachepylivka

Area
  - Total: 793.6 km^{2} (306.4 sq mi)

Population (2020)
  - Total: 14,491
  - Density: 18.26/km^{2} (47.29/sq mi)
- Time zone: UTC+2 (EET)
  - Summer (DST): UTC+3 (EEST)
- Website: http://zacheprda.gov.ua/

Zachepylivka Raion (Ukrainian: Зачепилівський район) was a raion (district) in Kharkiv Oblast of Ukraine. Its administrative center was the urban-type settlement of Zachepylivka. The raion was abolished on 18 July 2020 as part of the administrative reform of Ukraine, which reduced the number of raions of Kharkiv Oblast to seven. The area of Zachepylivka Raion was merged into Krasnohrad Raion. The last estimate of the raion population was 14,491 (2020 est.)

At the time of disestablishment, the raion consisted of one hromada, Zachepylivka settlement hromada with the administration in Zachepylivka.
