= Nova Vodolaha Raion =

Former subdivision of Kharkiv Oblast, Ukraine

Nova Vodolaha Raion Нововодолазький район
- Raion
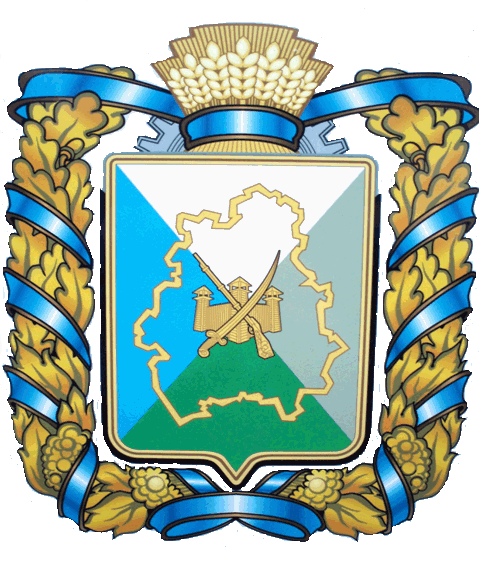
- Flag Coat of arms

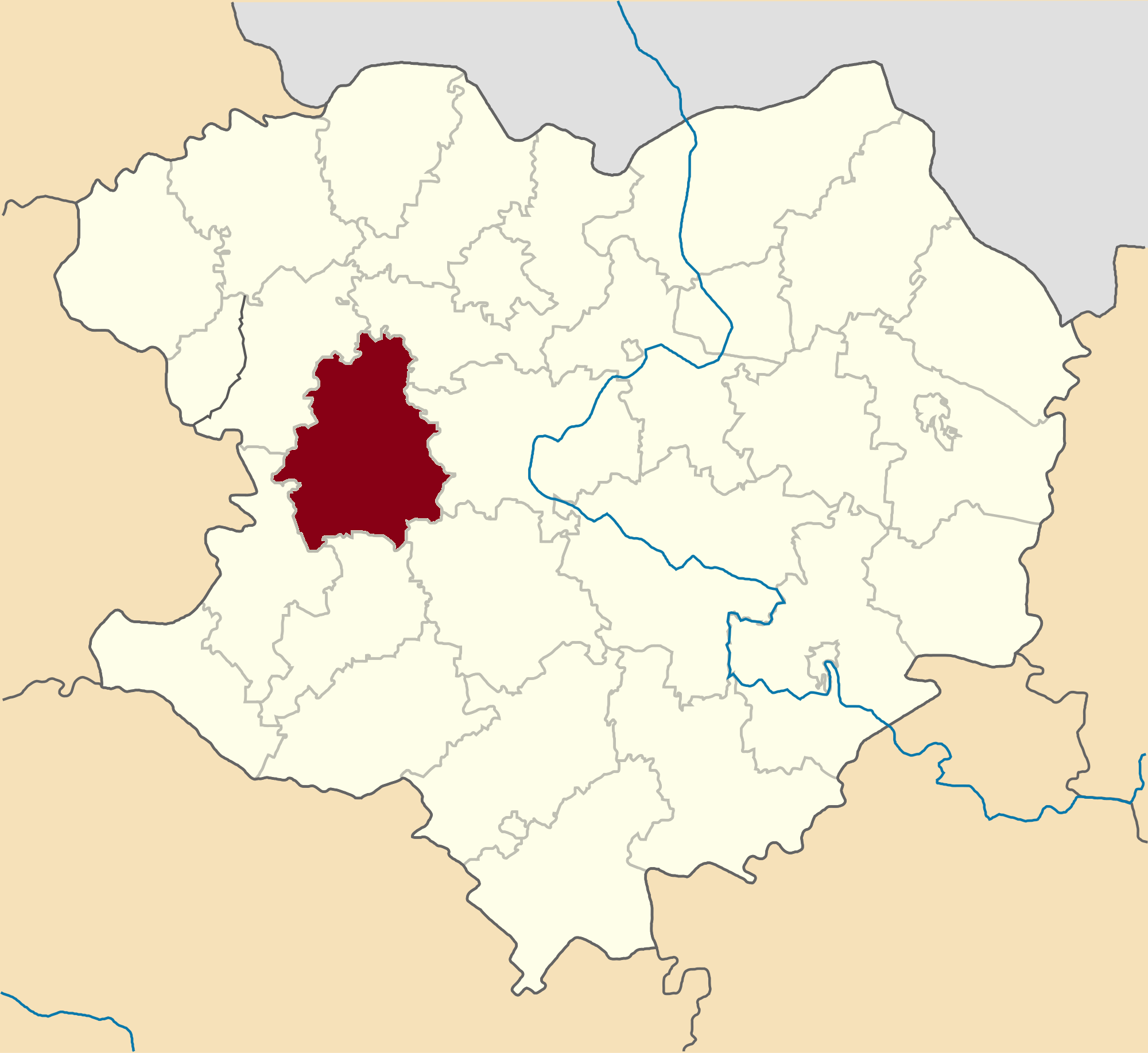
- Raion location in Kharkiv Oblast
- Coordinates: 49°38′43.9188″N 35°50′25.2096″E
- Country: Ukraine
- Oblast: Kharkiv Oblast
- Disestablished: 18 July 2020
- Admin. center: Nova Vodolaha

Area
  - Total: 1,182.74 km^{2} (456.66 sq mi)

Population (2020)
  - Total: 31,472
  - Density: 26.609/km^{2} (68.918/sq mi)
- Time zone: UTC+2 (EET)
  - Summer (DST): UTC+3 (EEST)
- Website: http://vodolagarda.at.ua/

Nova Vodolaha Raion (Ukrainian: Нововодолазький район) was a raion (district) in the Kharkiv Oblast of Ukraine. Its administrative center was the urban-type settlement of Nova Vodolaha. The raion was abolished on 18 July 2020 as part of the administrative reform of Ukraine, which reduced the number of raions of Kharkiv Oblast to seven. The area of Nova Vodolaha Raion was split between Kharkiv and Krasnohrad Raions. The last estimate of the raion population was 31,472 (2020 est.)

At the time of disestablishment, the raion consisted of two hromadas:

- Nova Vodolaha settlement hromada with the administration in Nova Vodolaha, transferred to Kharkiv Raion;
- Starovirivka rural hromada with the administration in the selo of Starovirivka, transferred to Krasnohrad Raion.
