= Ukrainian line =

Ukrainian Line
- Ukraine
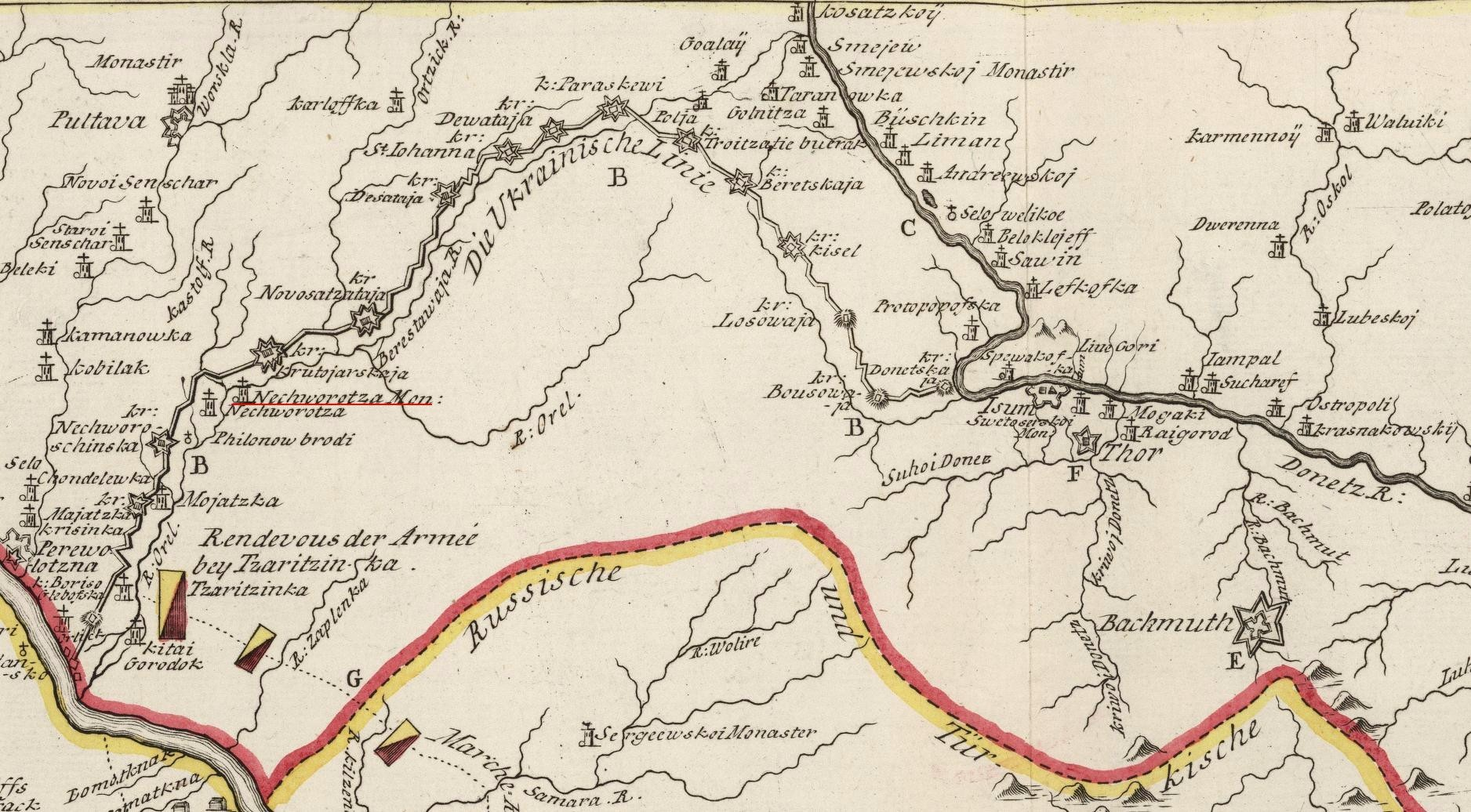
- Ukrainian Line in 1737

Site information
- Type: Defensive line
- Controlled by: Novorossiysk Governorate of the Russian Empire

Site history
- Built: 1731–1764
- In use: 1731–1770th
- Materials: Natural features, moats, earthworks

The Ukrainian defensive line was a Russian heavily fortified defensive line on the territory of modern Ukraine built between 1731–1764 on the lands of the Zaporozhian Sich and the Cossack Hetmanate. Built by imperial Russia, it strengthened the defense of the southern borders from Tatar incursions and established military bases in approximation to the Crimea. It was designed by a Russian general Johann Bernhard Graf Weißbach from Bohemia. 285 kilometers in length, it comprised 16 newly-constructed forts and 4 old forts repaired. The first stage was built from 1731–40 and subsequent construction began in the 1740s.

== History of construction ==
Following the defeat at the Pruth Campaign, Russia was forced to surrender some of its territorial acquisitions in Ukraine and around the Sea of Azov. In January 1711, the Crimean Tatar khan Devlet Giray, in support of the Zaporizhian Sich, went to Sloboda Ukraine with his main forces (approximately 50,000 members of the Crimean horde) and several hundred Cossacks.

The Russian Empire began to prepare actively for the next war with the Ottoman Empire to secure the return of Azov and the Northern Azov Sea Region (Pryazovia). According to official Russian legend, the Ukrainian line was built to prevent the Tatar incursion into the Poltava territory of the Hetmanate and the Kharkiv territory of Sloboda Ukraine. The line proved to be of limited success given the distance between the fortresses and that the Crimean Tatars excelled in asymmetrical warfare by raiding through gaps in the Russian defense lines. The bulk of the work on the construction was done by Ukrainian Cossacks and peasants in 1731–1732. Every year, 20 thousand Cossacks and 10 thousand peasants of the Hetmanate worked on the line, who were obliged to work with their own inventory and supplies, every 10th with an ox, and the Cossacks with their weapons. Thousands of Ukrainians lost their lives in the construction of the line. After signing the Treaty of Belgrade in 1739 and the transfer of the Russian-Turkish border from the territory between the Samara and Oril rivers on the Azov Sea, work on the line was terminated, and with the construction of the Dnieper line in 1770–1783, the Ukrainian line lost its military defensive value.

== Structure of the Line ==
The line ran from the Oril river to the Siverskyi Donets River. The Ukrainian line consisted of 16 forts and 49 redoubts.

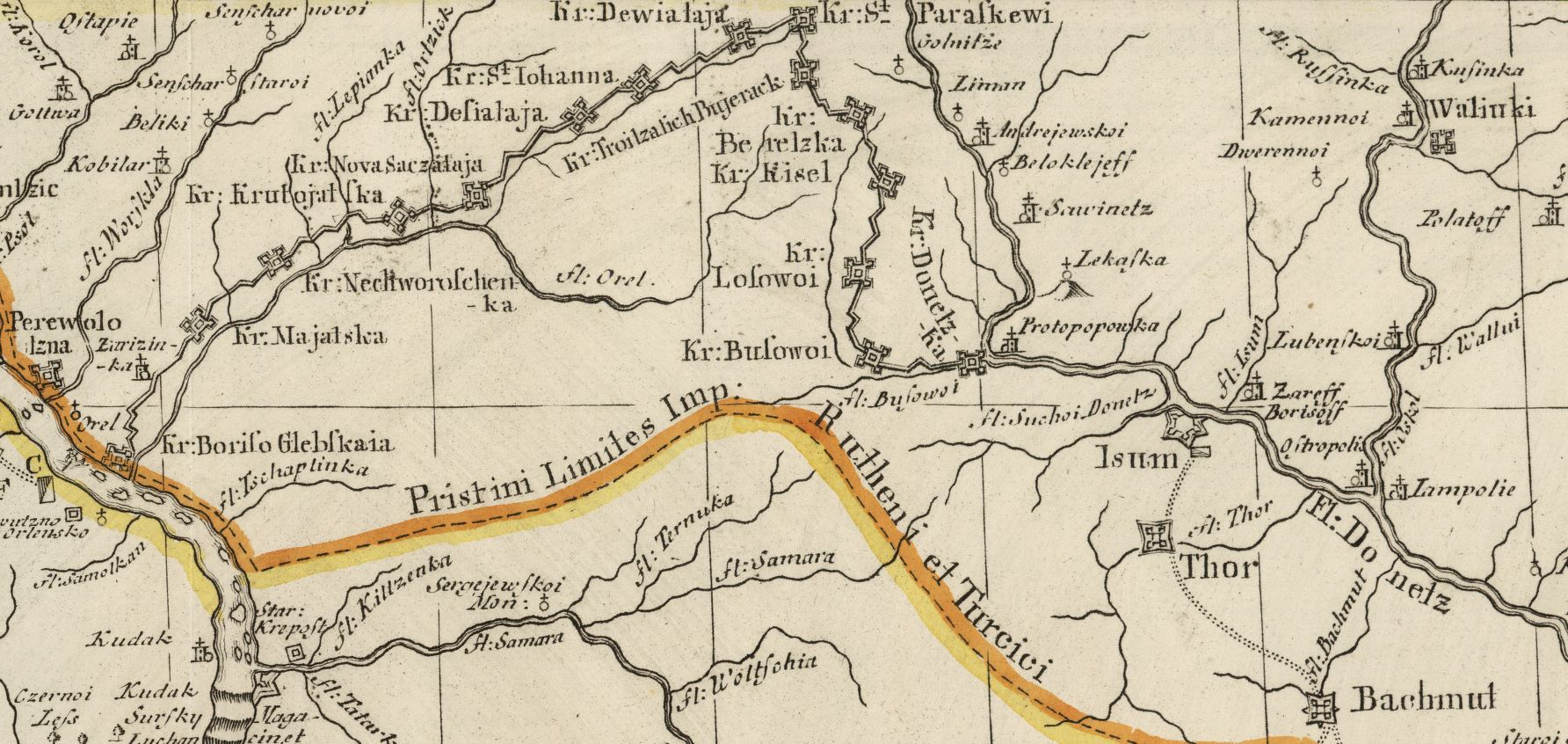
1737 map with 15 fortresses

=== Locations ===
Fortress Name	Other Name	Nearest settlement	Years	Coordinates
from Dnieper
Borisoglebskaya fortress	Kr. Boriso Glebskaia	Rudka	1731–1742	48.803148, 34.330804
Livenskaya fortress	Kr. Majatska	Livenske		49.109136, 34.519317
Gorodetskaya fortress	Kr. Nechworoschenka		1731–1736	49.137300, 34.666800
Kozlivska fortress	Kr. Krutojatska	Skalonivka	1731	49.189962, 35.169081
St. Theodore fortress	Kr. Nova Saczataja	Zaliniine	1731	49.168657, 35.093911
Bilevska fortress	Kr. Desiataja	Berestyn		49.369017, 35.452845
St. John (Ioanivska) Fortress	Kr. St. Iohanna	Ivanivske	1731–1742	49.440044, 35.585453
Orel fortress	Kr. Dewiataja	Diachkivka	1731–1742	49.472411, 35.722404
St. Paraskeva fortress	Kr. St. Paraskewi	Paraskoviia	1731–1742	49.517610, 35.868816
Efrem fortress	Kr. Troitzatich Bujerack	Yefremivka	1731–1742	49.441978, 36.064019
St. Alexis fortress	Kr. Beretzka	Oleksiivka	1731–1742	49.392243, 36.264049
St. Michael fortress	Kr. Kisel	Mykhailivka	1731–1742	49.321668, 36.446030
Slobodskaya fortress	Kr. Losowoi	Pavlivka	1731	49.215590, 36.578546
Tambov fortress	Kr. Busowoi	Marivka	1731	49.136049, 36.741880
St. Peter fortress	Kr. Donetzka	Petrivske	1731	49.163730, 36.890191
Ryazhskaya fortress		Riaske		49.173816, 34.916266
Vasylivska fortress		Nekhvoroshcha	1731–1736	49.164035, 34.752155
to Siversky Donets

For defense there were 20 regiments of land militia, (14 cavalry regiments, and six infantry regiments) with about 22 000; it had 180 artillery guns and 39 mortars. In 1740 there were 18 forts and 140 redoubts. Bilevska castle was the center of the line. Until 1764, a land militia office was located there.
