= Sakhnovshchyna Raion =

Former subdivision of Kharkiv Oblast, Ukraine

Sakhnovshchyna Raion Сахновщинський район
- Raion
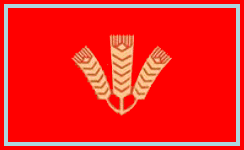
- Flag Coat of arms

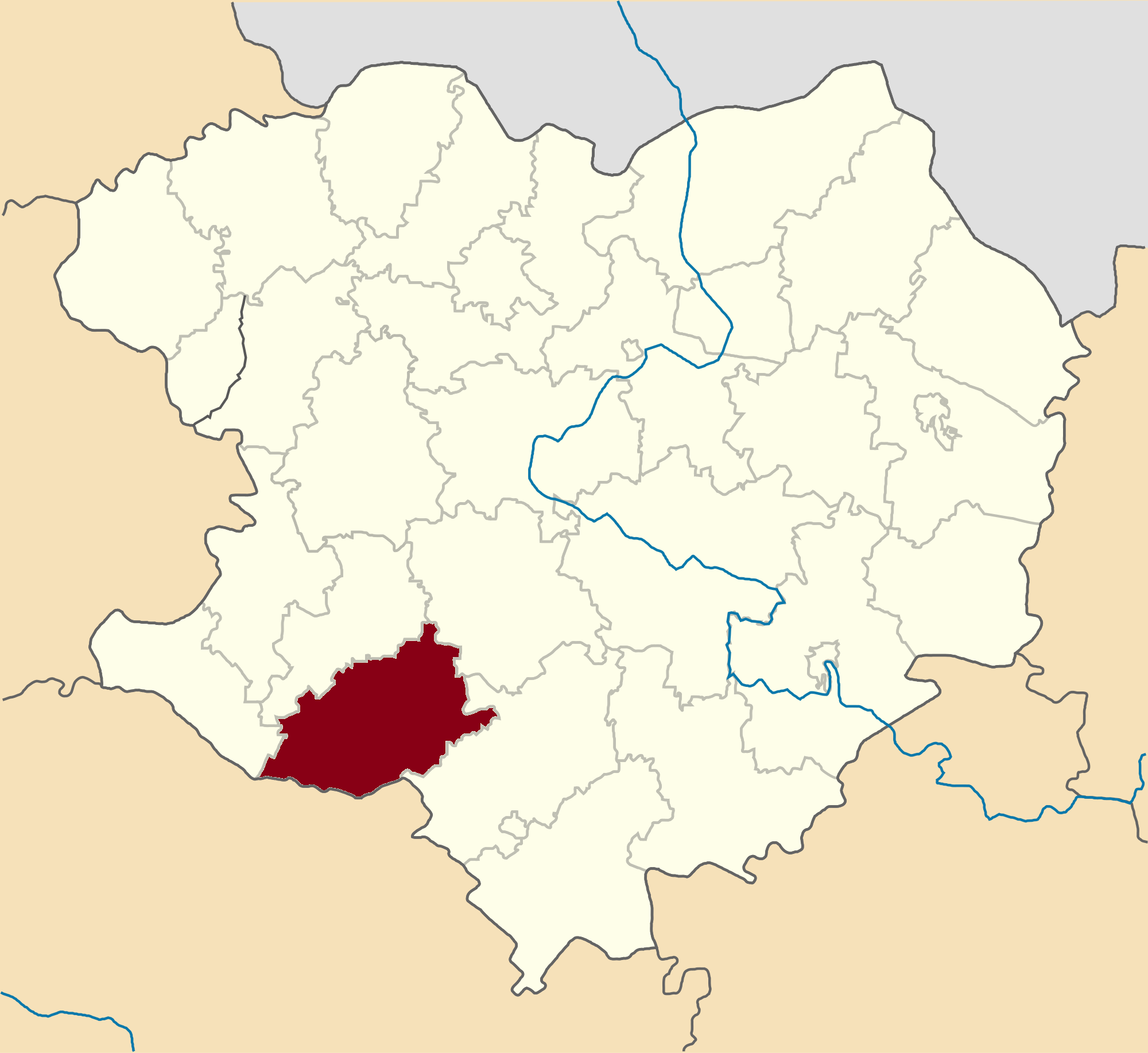
- Raion location in Kharkiv Oblast
- Coordinates: 49°5′58.3218″N 35°53′1.1508″E
- Country: Ukraine
- Oblast: Kharkiv Oblast
- Disestablished: 18 July 2020
- Admin. center: Sakhnovshchyna

Area
  - Total: 1,169.9 km^{2} (451.7 sq mi)

Population (2020)
  - Total: 20,181
  - Density: 17.250/km^{2} (44.678/sq mi)
- Time zone: UTC+2 (EET)
  - Summer (DST): UTC+3 (EEST)
- Website: http://www.sahnovrda.ho.ua/

Sakhnovschyna Raion (Ukrainian: Сахновщинський район) was a raion (district) in Kharkiv Oblast of Ukraine. Its administrative center was the urban-type settlement of Sakhnovshchyna. The raion was abolished on 18 July 2020 as part of the administrative reform of Ukraine, which reduced the number of raions of Kharkiv Oblast to seven. The area of Sakhnovschyna Raion was merged into Krasnohrad Raion. The last estimate of the raion population was 20,181 (2020 est.)

At the time of disestablishment, the raion consisted of one hromada, Sakhnovshchyna settlement hromada with the administration in Sakhnovshchyna.
