= Samar, Dnipro =

Samar Самар
- neighborhood and former Cossack city
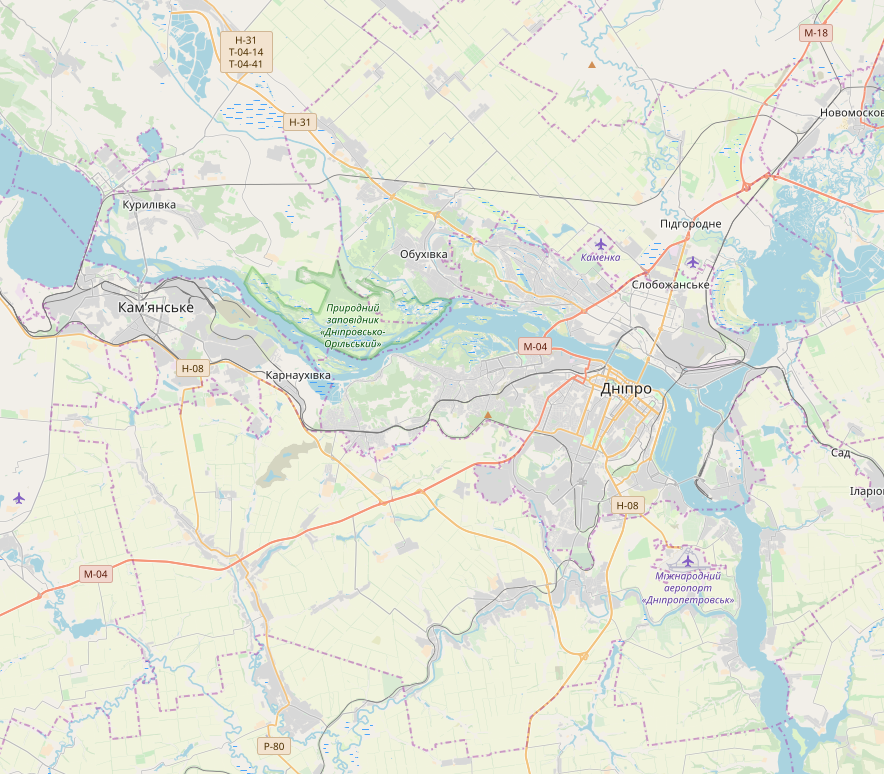
- Location of Samar within the city of Dnipro Samar (Ukraine)
- Coordinates: 48°30′02″N 35°09′48″E
- Country: Ukraine
- City: Dnipro
- First mentioned: 1576
- Fortress liquidated: 1783
- Time zone: UTC+2 (EET)
  - Summer (DST): UTC+3 (EEST)

Samar (Ukrainian: Самар) is a neighborhood of the Samarskyi District (urban district) of the city of Dnipro in southern Ukraine. It is located at the mouth of Samara River on its right bank where the river enters Dnieper. Samar, originally a Cossack settlement, was destroyed in 17th century and consequently rebuilt in a different location, and is thus sometimes called Old Samar (Ukrainian: Стара Самар) to distinguish it from the New Samar.

== History ==
The earliest mentioning of Samar as a settlement in Lower Dnieper region is a royal edict of the King of Poland Stephen Báthory in 1576. It was a river port administrated by local Cossacks.

In 1668 at its location was built Novobohorodytska (Bohorodytska) Fortress with an area of 70 hectares (170 acres). It is the only large settlement of the Zaporozhian Cossacks on Ukraine's steppes which survived without significant destruction. The remains the fortress occupy an area of almost 70 hectares. According to scientists, the fortress did not appear out of nowhere: more than 1,700 years ago there was a settlement of an ancient tribe. In 2001, by a resolution of the Government of Ukraine, the remains of the Novobohorodytska fortress was declared a historical monument of national importance.

In the 2010s the exact year of foundation of (the city) Dnipro was still researched. Archeologic founds suggest that the town existed in 1524. In 2011 The Ukrainian Week stated that archaeologists of the Dnipro National University discovered artifacts dated around 1520s in Samar. The Dnipro city council officially set 1526 as the date of the city's foundation in August 2026. (Previously 1776 was the official date of the foundation of Dnipro.) This year of foundation is based on the existence of Samar on the territory of the modern Dnipro. (Note: Not all historians supported the new dating, as they considered the evidence insufficient to determine 1526 as the year of the city's foundation.) Starting in December 2025 the city council had been consulting with experts to set a new official year of the city's foundation; since they believe 1776 "is a myth of imperial Russia", and that the city existed many years before 1776.

== Gallery ==
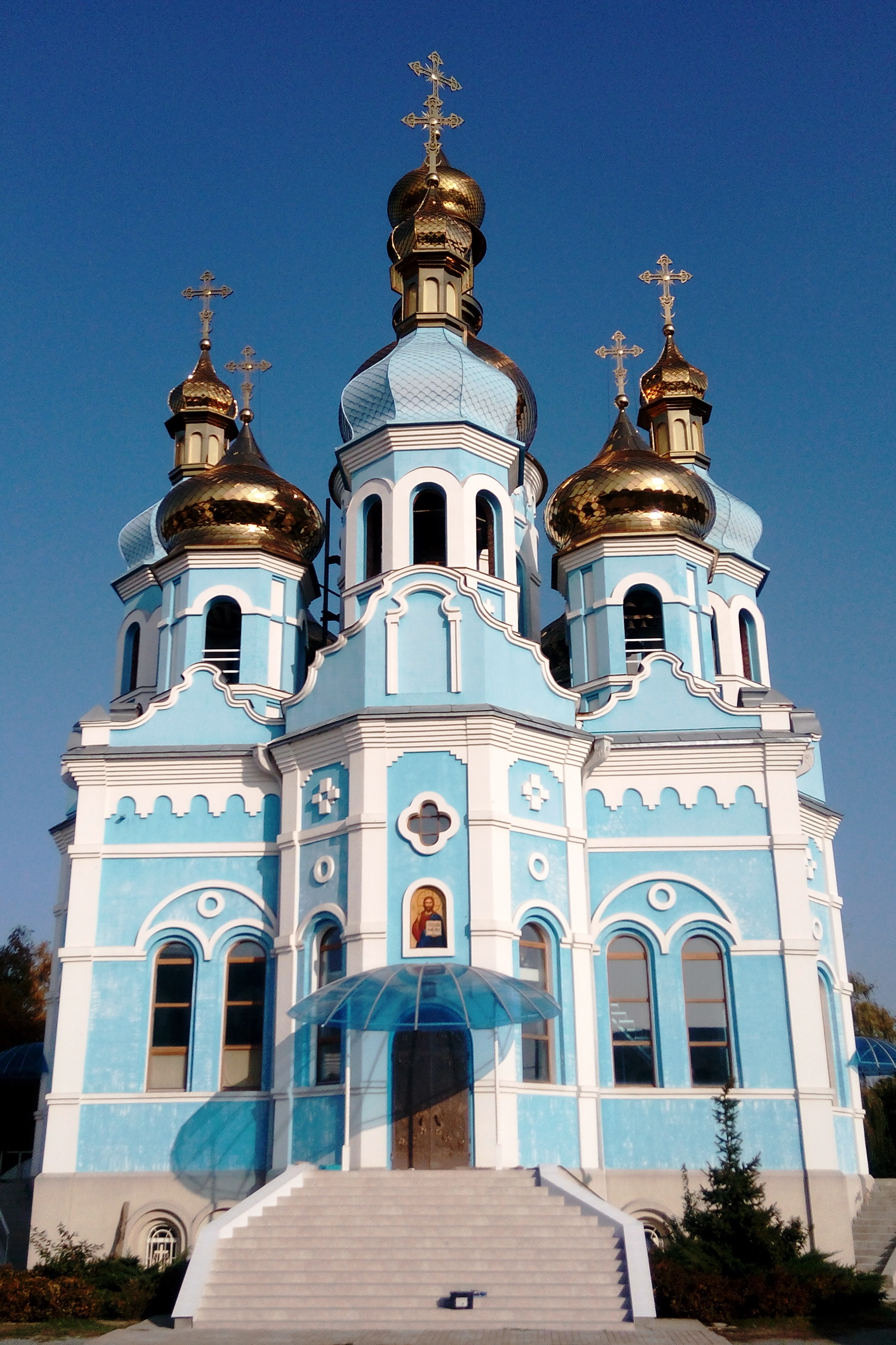
Church of the Intercession, Dnipro (Odynkivka)

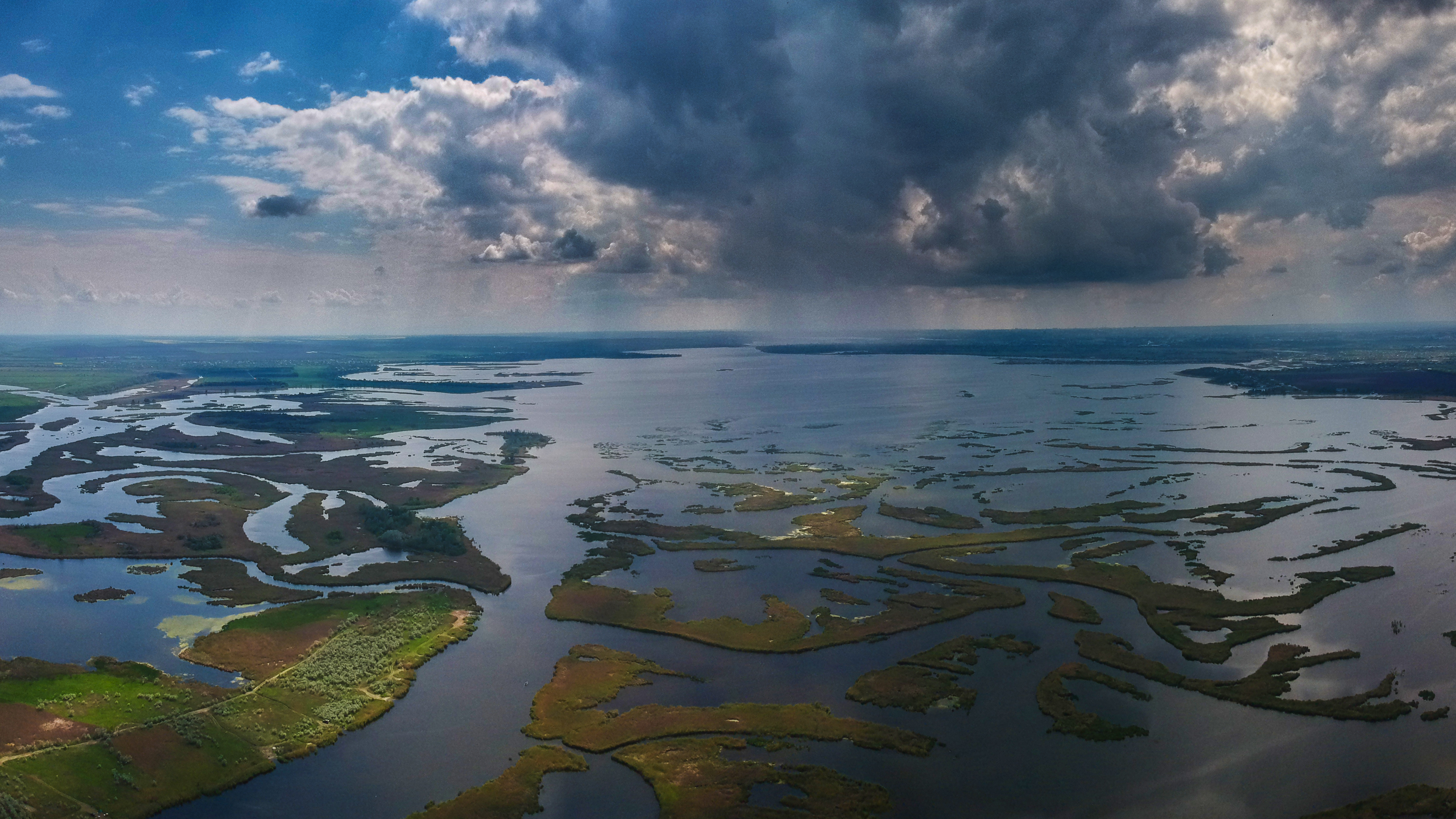
Samara Bay

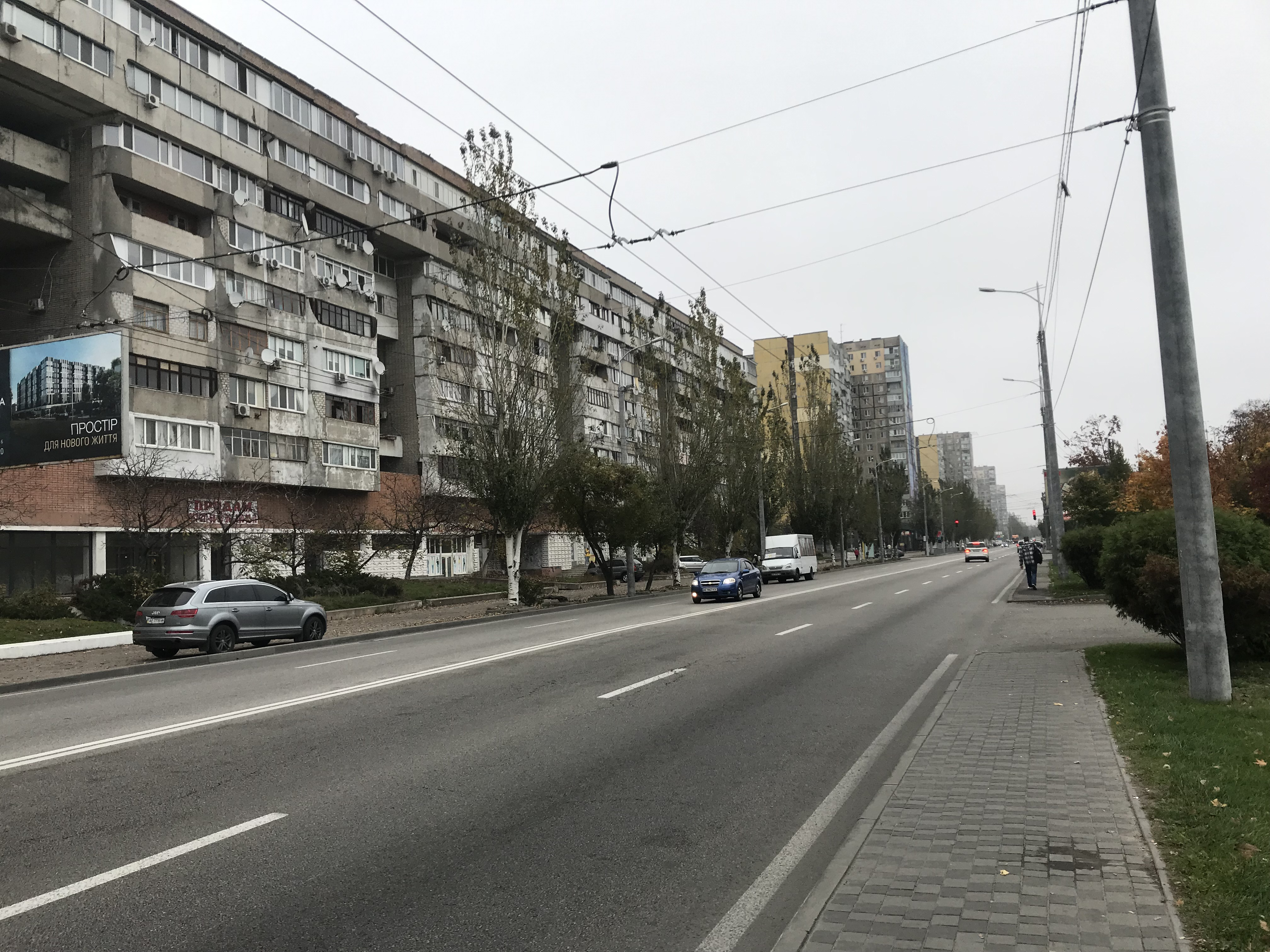
Soniachna Naberezhna Street; until April 2023 this street was named after Marshal of the Soviet Union Rodion Malinovsky

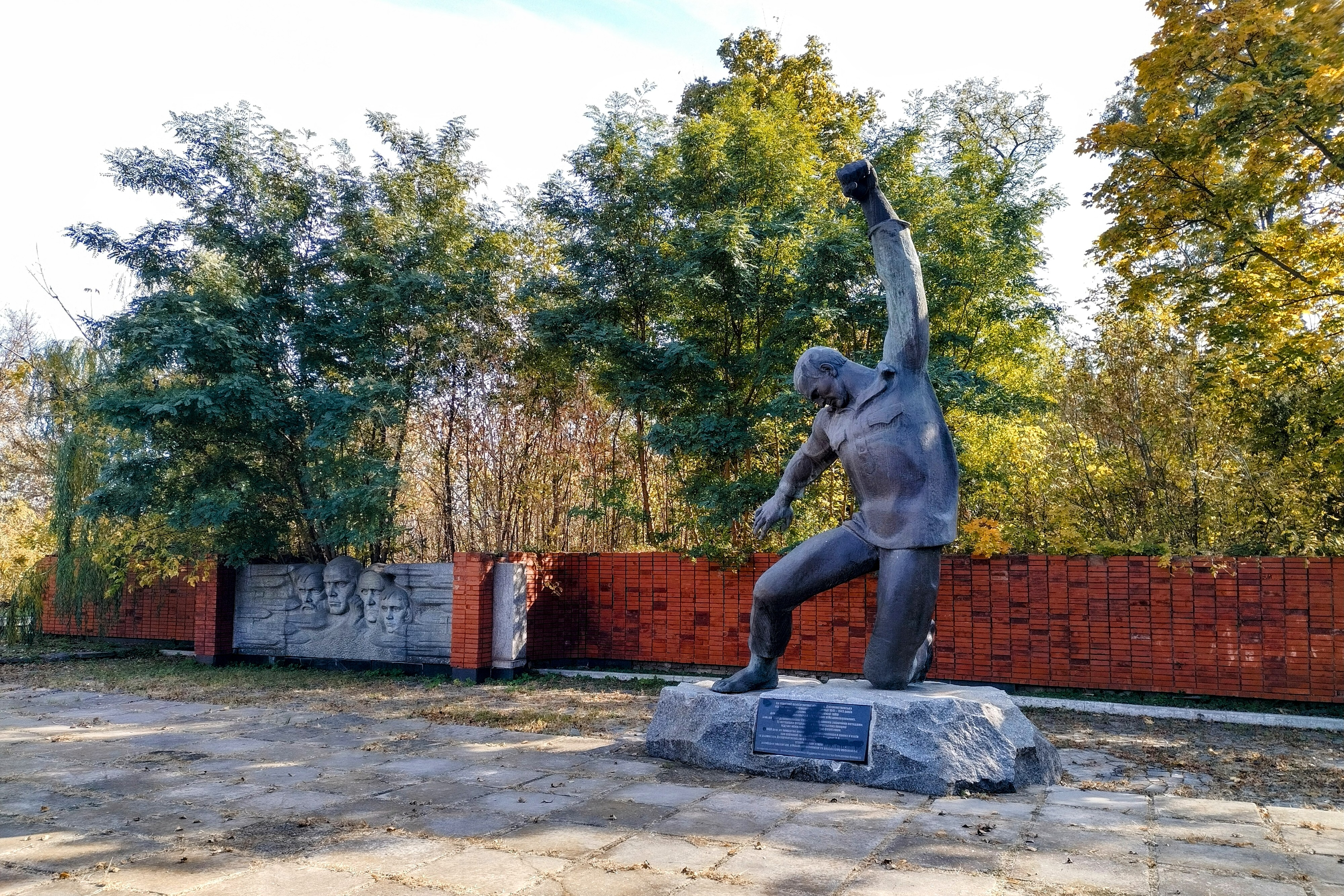
Monument to the victims of the Ihren concentration camp located on the premises of the Dnipropetrovsk Regional Clinical Hospital of Psychiatric Care

== See also ==
- Samar, Ukraine
