= Berestyn Raion =

Subdivision of Kharkiv Oblast, Ukraine

Berestyn Raion Берестинський район
- Raion
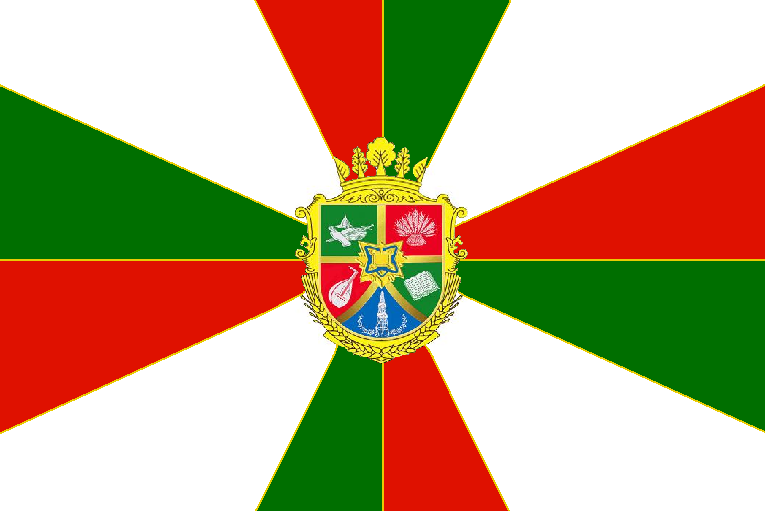
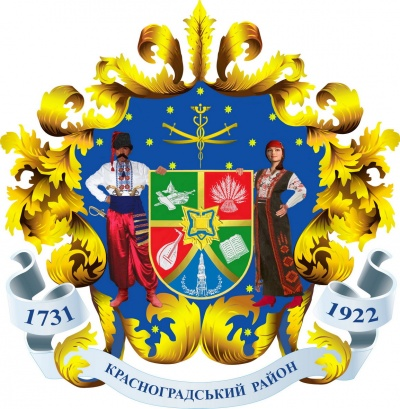
- Flag Coat of arms

- Raion location in Kharkiv Oblast
- Coordinates: 49°23′45.0636″N 35°31′7.464″E
- Country: Ukraine
- Oblast: Kharkiv Oblast
- Admin. center: Berestyn
- Subdivisions: 6 hromadas

Area
  - Total: 4,334.2 km^{2} (1,673.4 sq mi)

Population (2022)
  - Total: 103,856
  - Density: 23.962/km^{2} (62.061/sq mi)
- Time zone: UTC+2 (EET)
  - Summer (DST): UTC+3 (EEST)

Berestyn Raion (Ukrainian: Берестинський район), formerly known as Krasnohrad Raion (Ukrainian: Красноградський район) is a raion (district) in Kharkiv Oblast of Ukraine. Its administrative center is the town of Berestyn. Population: 103,856 (2022 estimate).

On 18 July 2020, as part of the administrative reform of Ukraine, the number of raions of Kharkiv Oblast was reduced to seven, and the area of Krasnohrad Raion was significantly expanded. Three abolished raions, Kehychivka, Sakhnovshchyna, and Zachepylivka Raions, as well as part of Nova Vodolaha Raion, were merged into Krasnohrad Raion. The January 2020 estimate of the raion population was 43,034 (2020 est.).

On 19 September 2024, the Verkhovna Rada voted to rename Krasnohrad Raion to Berestyn Raion.

== Subdivisions ==
=== Current ===
After the reform in July 2020, the raion consisted of 6 hromadas:

- Berestyn urban hromada with the administration in the city of Berestyn, retained from Krasnohrad Raion;
- Kehychivka settlement hromada with the administration in the rural settlement of Kehychivka, transferred from Kehychivka Raion;
- Natalyne rural hromada with the administration in the village of Natalyne, retained from Krasnohrad Raion;
- Sakhnovshchyna settlement hromada with the administration in the rural settlement of Sakhnovshchyna, transferred from Sakhnovshchyna Raion;
- Starovirivka rural hromada with the administration in the village of Starovirivka, transferred from Nova Vodolaha Raion.
- Zachepylivka settlement hromada with the administration in the rural settlement of Zachepylivka, transferred from Zachepylivka Raion.

=== Before 2020 ===
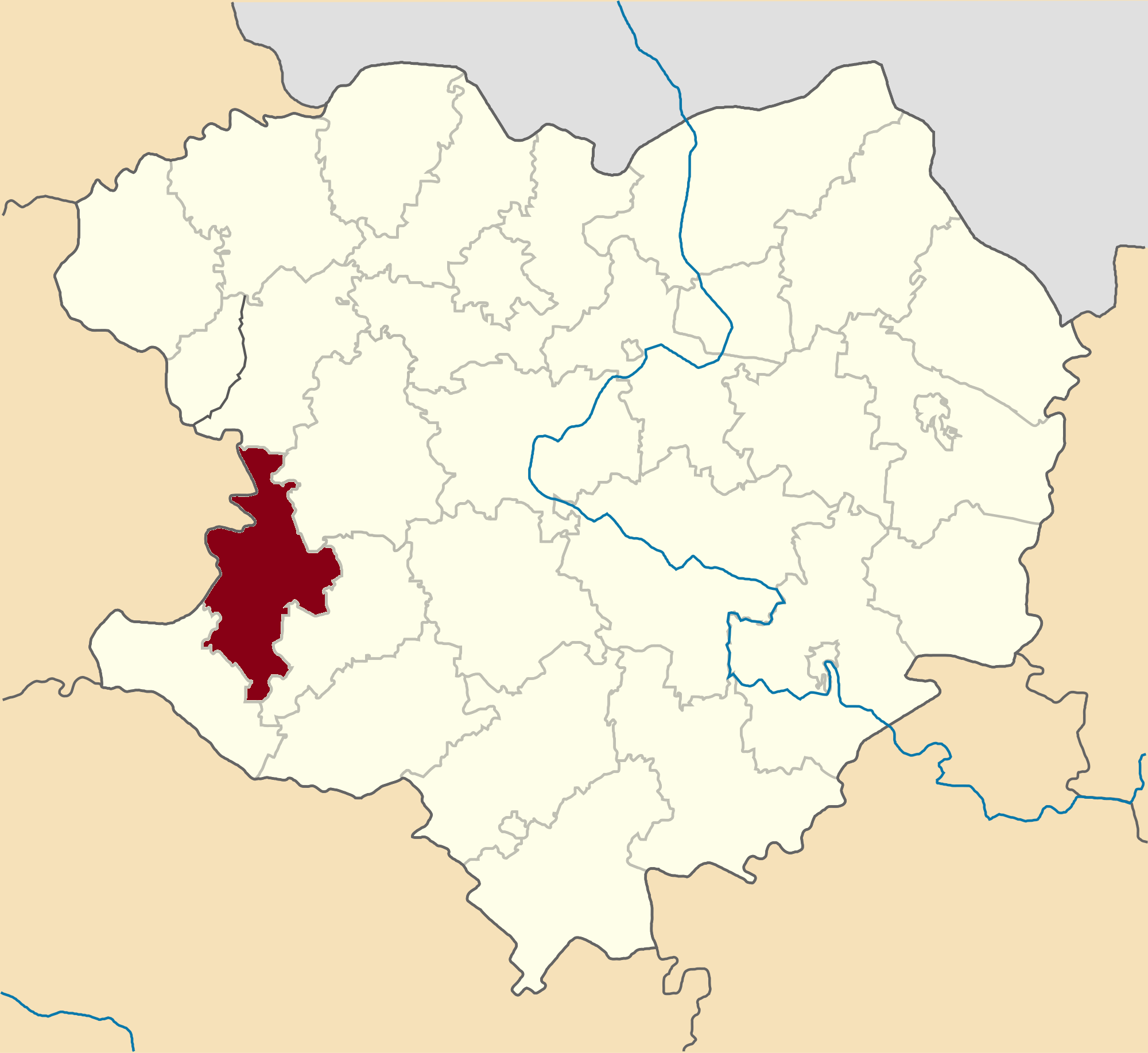
Krasnohrad Raion in Kharkiv Oblast before 2020

Before the 2020 reform, the raion consisted of two hromadas:

- Krasnohrad urban hromada with the administration in Krasnohrad;
- Natalyne rural hromada with the administration in Natalyne.

== Geography ==
The territory of the Berestyn raion is located on the Poltava Plain and Dnieper Lowland, within the forest steppe natural zone. The relief of the district is an undulating plain with ravines and gullies.

The climate of the raion is temperate continental with cold winters and hot summers. The average annual temperature is +7.3 °C (in January -5.1, in July +19,7). The average annual rainfall is 520 mm. The highest rainfall occurs in the summer. There are large forest areas (pine and deciduous trees) on the territory of the raion. The soils of the community are chernozems and meadow soils.

The Berestyn raion is located on the right bank of the Oril River, the left tributary is the Dnieper.

Mineral resources of the Berestyn Raion: loams, clays, sandstones, peat, natural gas.The district has developed mining, processing, and agriculture industries.
