= Kehychivka =

Rural locality in Kharkiv Oblast, Ukraine

Kehychivka Кегичівка
- Rural settlement
- Flag Seal

- Location within Kharkiv Oblast
- Coordinates: 49°17′05″N 35°45′35″E
- Country: Ukraine
- Oblast: Kharkiv Oblast
- Raion: Berestyn Raion

Population (2022)
  - Total: 5,628
- Time zone: UTC+2 (EET)
  - Summer (DST): UTC+3 (EEST)

Kehychivka (Ukrainian: Кегичівка, Russian: Кегичёвка) is a rural settlement in Berestyn Raion, Kharkiv Oblast, Ukraine. It hosts the administration of Kehychivka settlement hromada, one of the hromadas of Ukraine. Population: 5,628 (2022 estimate).

== History ==
It was a village in Kharkov Governorate of the Russian Empire.

Urban-type settlement since 1957.

In January 1989 the population was 7151 people. In January 2013 the population was 6246 people.

Until 18 July 2020, Kehychivka was the administrative center of Kehychivka Raion. The raion was abolished in July 2020 as part of the administrative reform of Ukraine, which reduced the number of raions of Kharkiv Oblast to seven. The area of Kechyhivka Raion was merged into Krasnohrad Raion.

Until 26 January 2024, Kehychivka was designated urban-type settlement. On this day, a new law entered into force which abolished this status, and Kehychivka became a rural settlement.

== Economy ==
=== Transportation ===
Kehychivka has access to the Highway M29 which connects Kharkiv and Dnipro, as well to a road leading to Izium with further access to Sloviansk.

Kehychivka railway station is on the Southern railway connecting Berestyn and Lozova, with further connections to Kharkiv and Dnipro.
