= Kehychivka Raion =

Former subdivision of Kharkiv Oblast, Ukraine

Kehychivka Raion Кегичівський район
- Raion
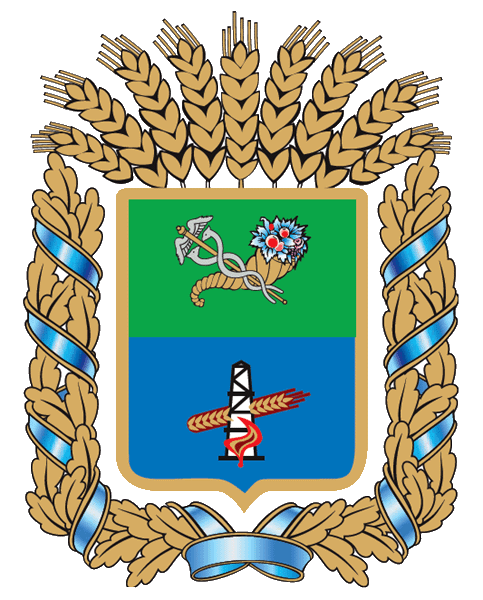
- Flag Coat of arms

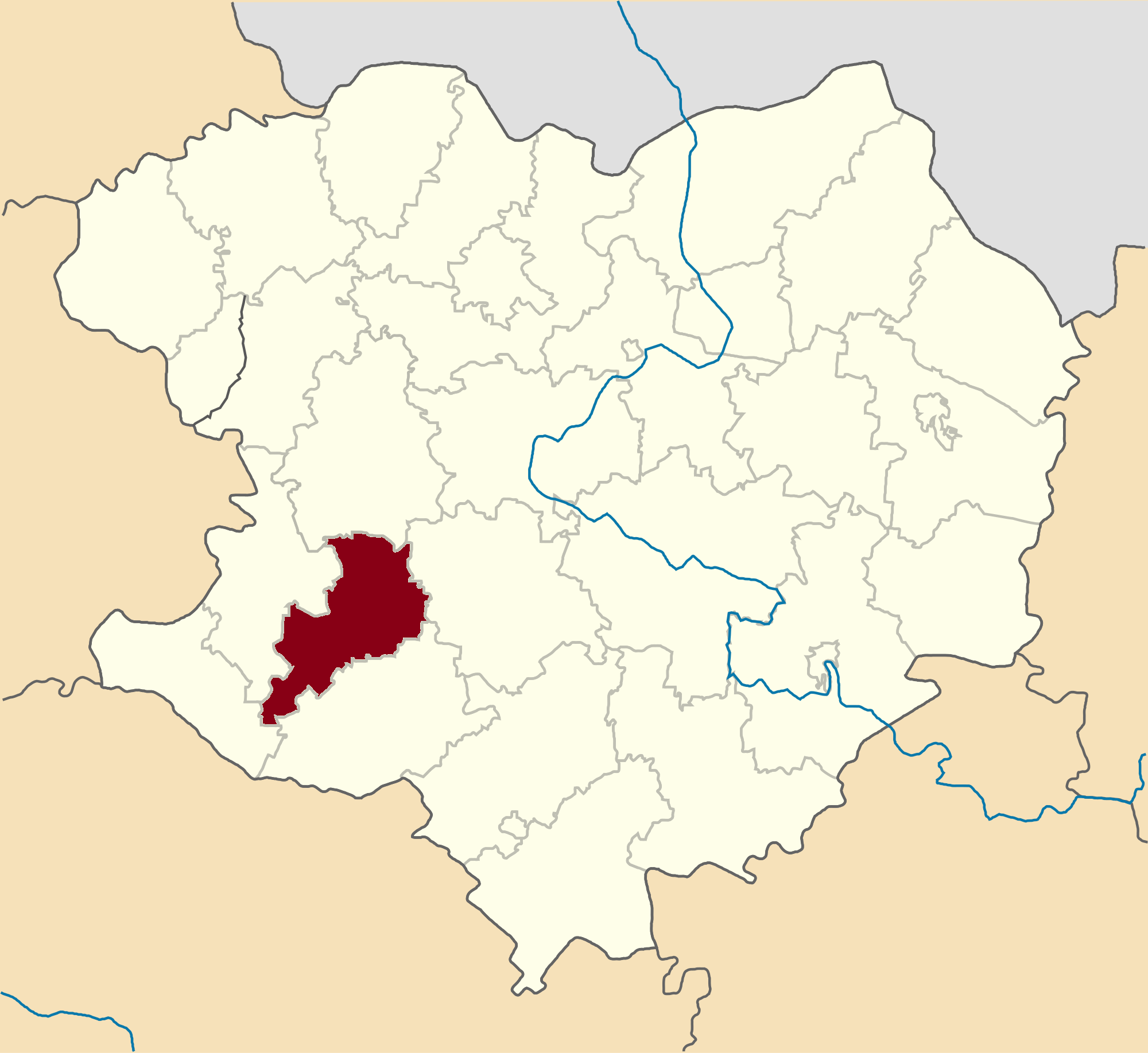
- Raion location in Kharkiv Oblast
- Coordinates: 49°18′30.7254″N 35°47′42.576″E
- Country: Ukraine
- Oblast: Kharkiv Oblast
- Disestablished: 18 July 2020
- Capital: Kehychivka

Area
  - Total: 782 km^{2} (302 sq mi)

Population (2020)
  - Total: 20,353
  - Density: 26.0/km^{2} (67.4/sq mi)
- Time zone: UTC+2 (EET)
  - Summer (DST): UTC+3 (EEST)

Kehychivka Raion (Ukrainian: Кегичівський район) was a raion (district) in Kharkiv Oblast of Ukraine. Its administrative center was the urban-type settlement of Kehychivka. The raion was abolished on 18 July 2020 as part of the administrative reform of Ukraine, which reduced the number of raions of Kharkiv Oblast to seven. The area of Kehychivka Raion was merged into Krasnohrad Raion. The last estimate of the raion population was 20,353 (2020 est.)

At the time of disestablishment, the raion consisted of one hromada, Kehychivka settlement hromada with the administration in Kehychivka.
