= Oril =

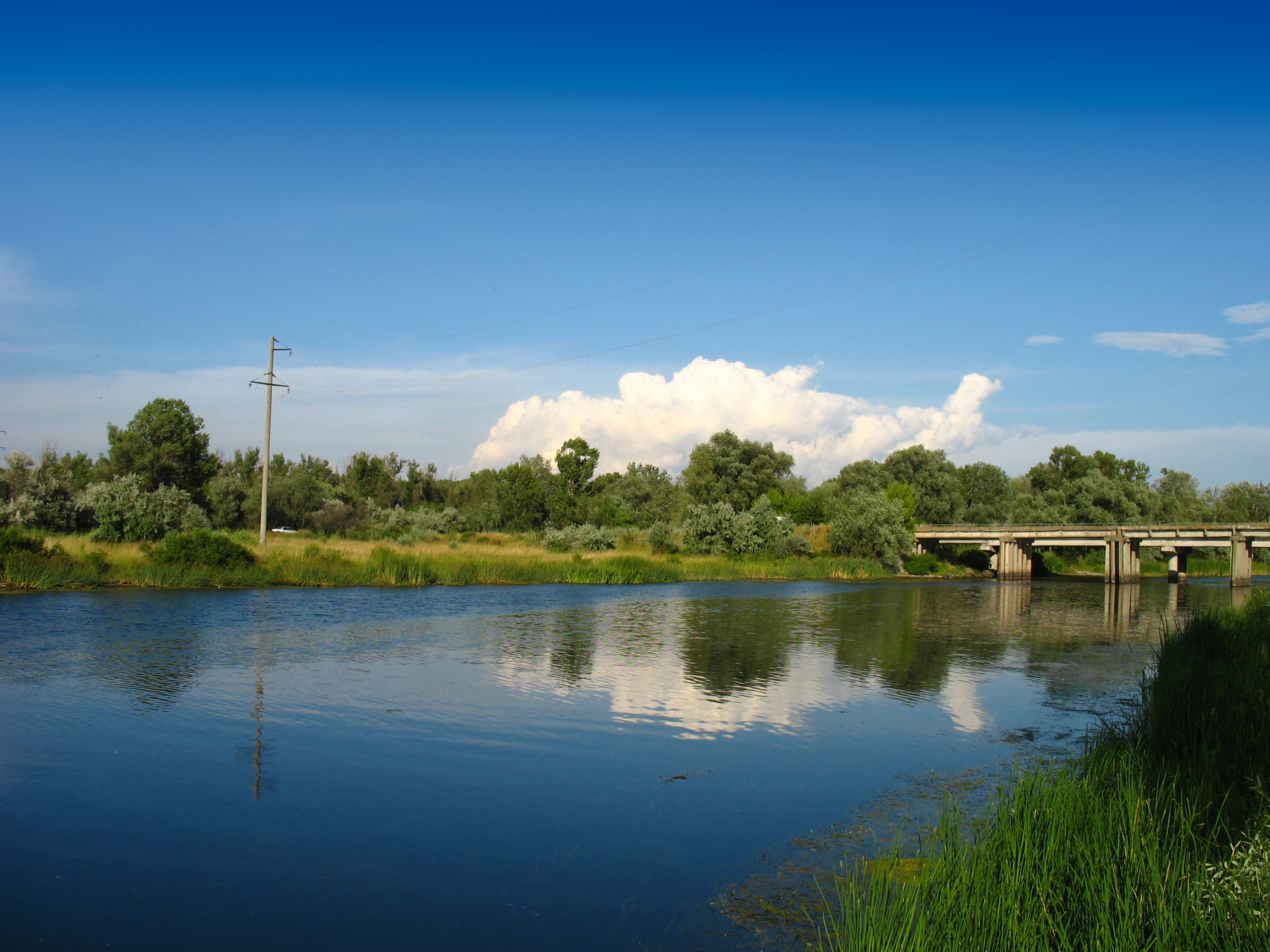
- Oril river in Dnipropetrovsk Oblast

Location
- Country: Ukraine

Physical characteristics
- Source
  - location: Kharkiv Oblast
- Mouth: Dnieper
  - coordinates: 48°31′15″N 34°52′47″E
- Length: 346 km (215 mi)
- Basin size: 9,800 km^{2} (3,800 sq mi)

Basin features
- Progression: Dnieper→ Dnieper–Bug estuary→ Black Sea

The Oril (Ukrainian: Оріль) is a river in Ukraine, a left tributary of the river Dnieper. It is 346 kilometres (215 mi) long and its basin area is 9,800 square kilometres (3,784 sq mi). The Oril finds its source near the village of Yefremivka in Lozova Raion, Kharkiv Oblast. It flows into the Dnieper near the city Dnipro.
