= Berestyn =

Town in Kharkiv Oblast, Ukraine

Berestyn Берестин
- City
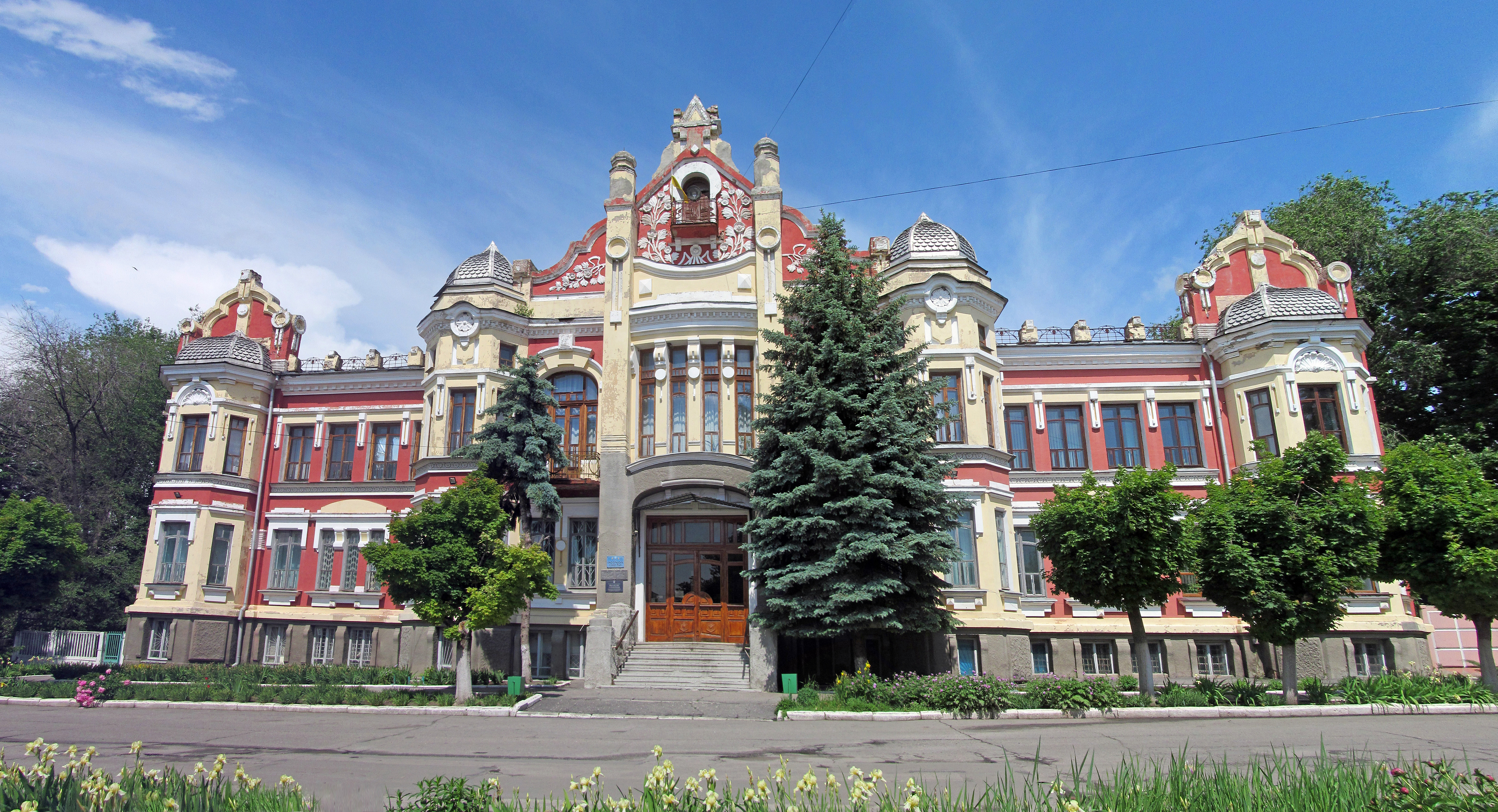
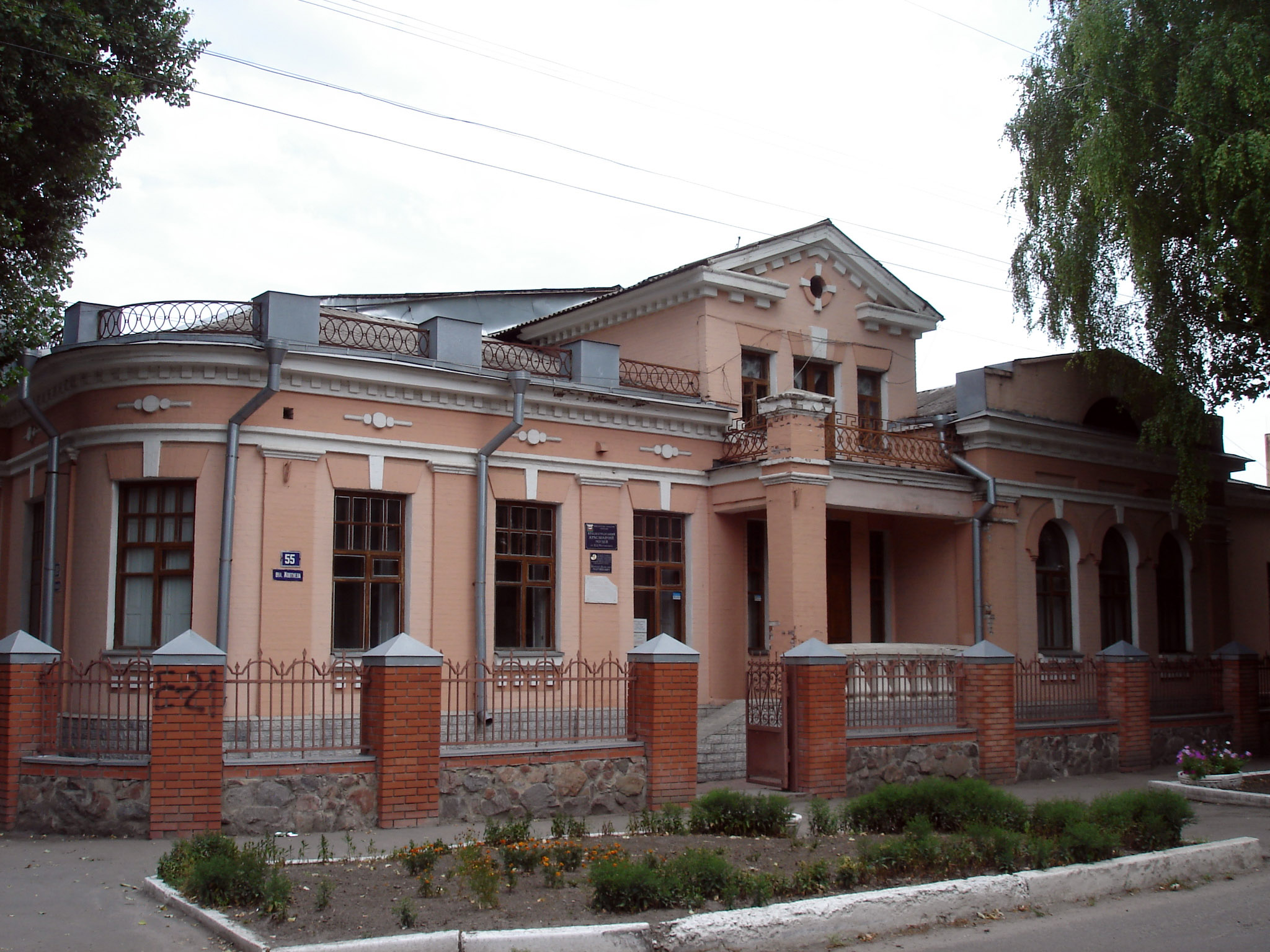
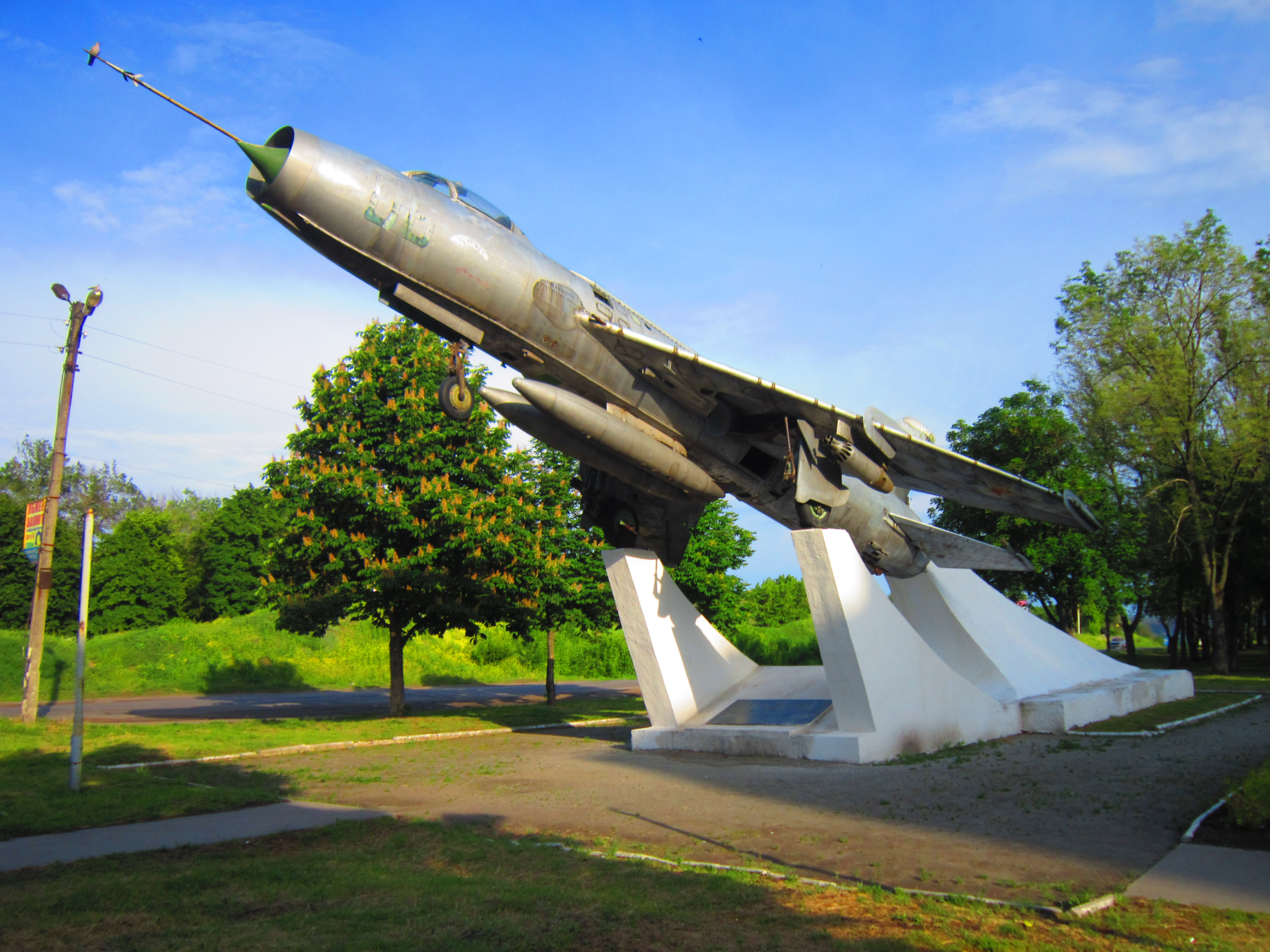
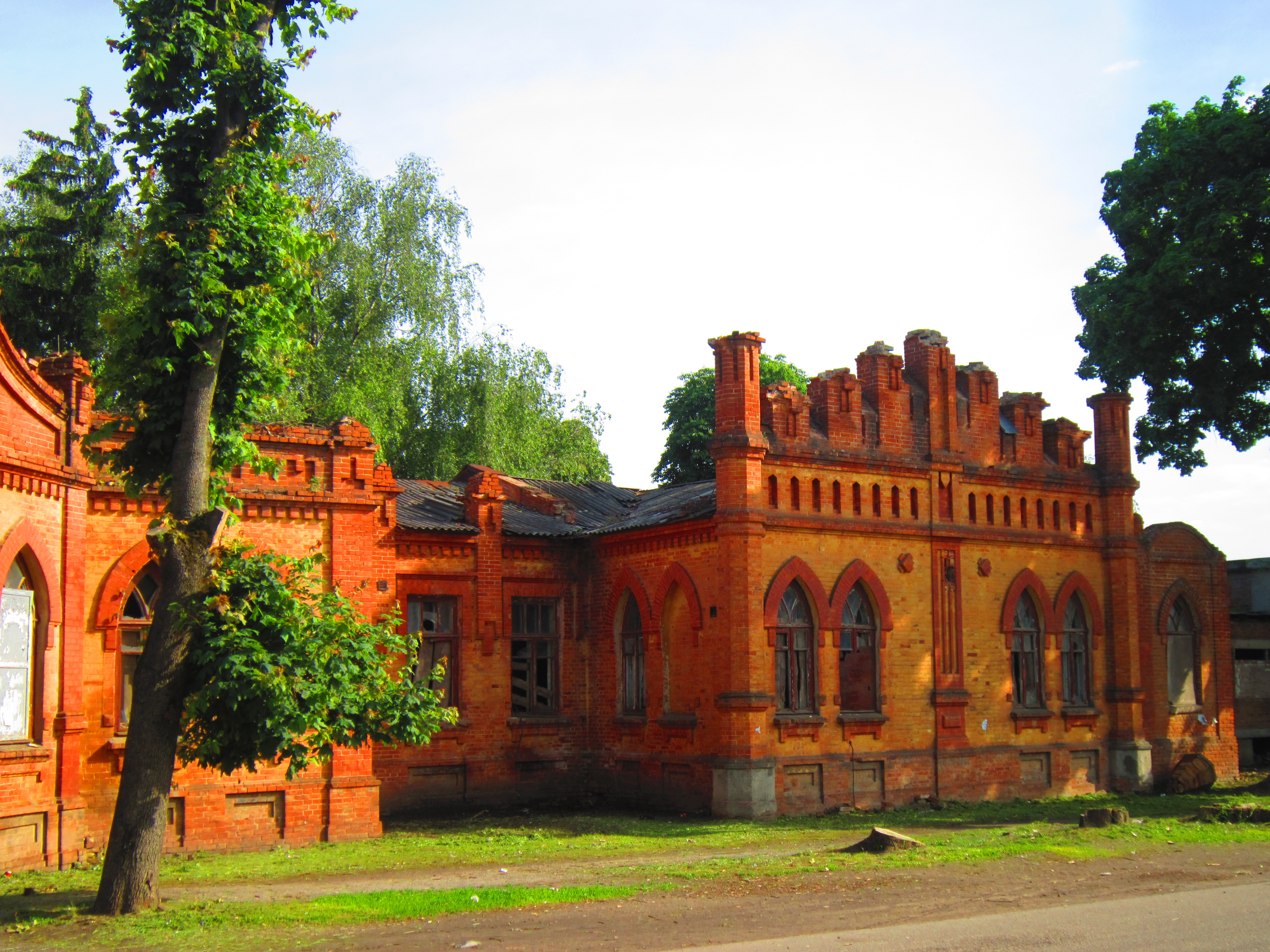
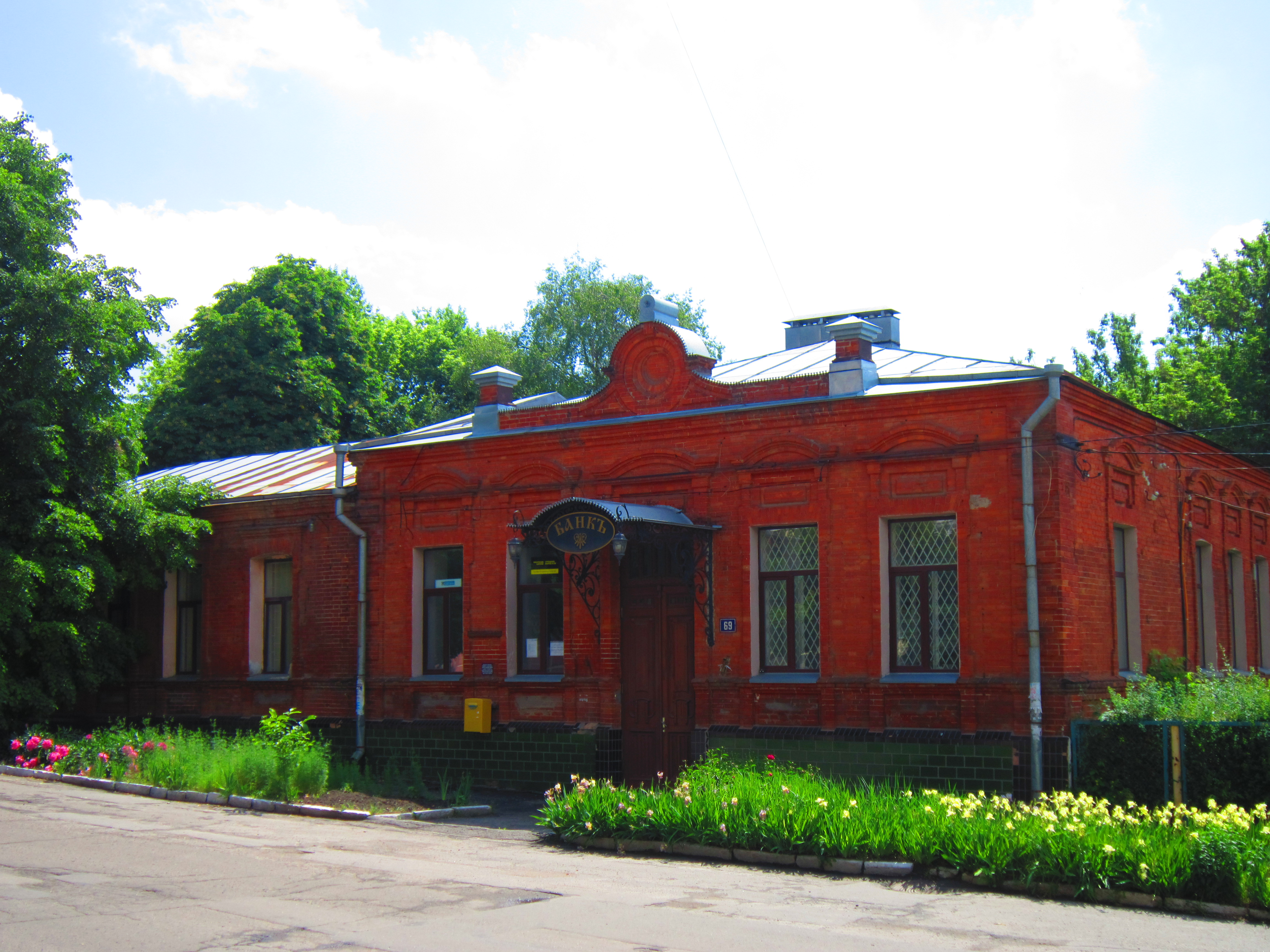
- Former Zemstvo Administration Raion Local History Museum Monument to Soviet Pilots Zemstvo Hospital Bank

- Flag Coat of arms
- Interactive map of Berestyn
- Location of Berestyn Berestyn (Ukraine)
- Coordinates: 49°22′00″N 35°27′00″E
- Country: Ukraine
- Oblast: Kharkiv Oblast
- Raion: Berestyn Raion
- Hromada: Krasnohrad urban hromada

Area
  - Total: 13.55 km^{2} (5.23 sq mi)

Population (2022)
  - Total: 19,674
- Time zone: UTC+2 (EET)
  - Summer (DST): UTC+3 (EET)
- Website: www.krasnograd.com.ua

Berestyn (Ukrainian: Берестин, IPA: [bereˈstɪn]), formerly known as Krasnohrad (Ukrainian: Красноград, IPA: [krɐsnoˈɦrɑd]) or Krasnograd, is a city in Kharkiv Oblast, Ukraine. From 1784 to 1922, it was known as Kostiantynohrad. (Note: Ukrainian: Костянтиноград; Russian: Константиноград, romanized: Konstantinograd.) It serves as the administrative center of Berestyn Raion. Berestyn hosts the administration of Krasnohrad urban hromada, one of the hromadas of Ukraine. In 2022, the population was estimated to be 19,674 (2022 estimate).

== History ==
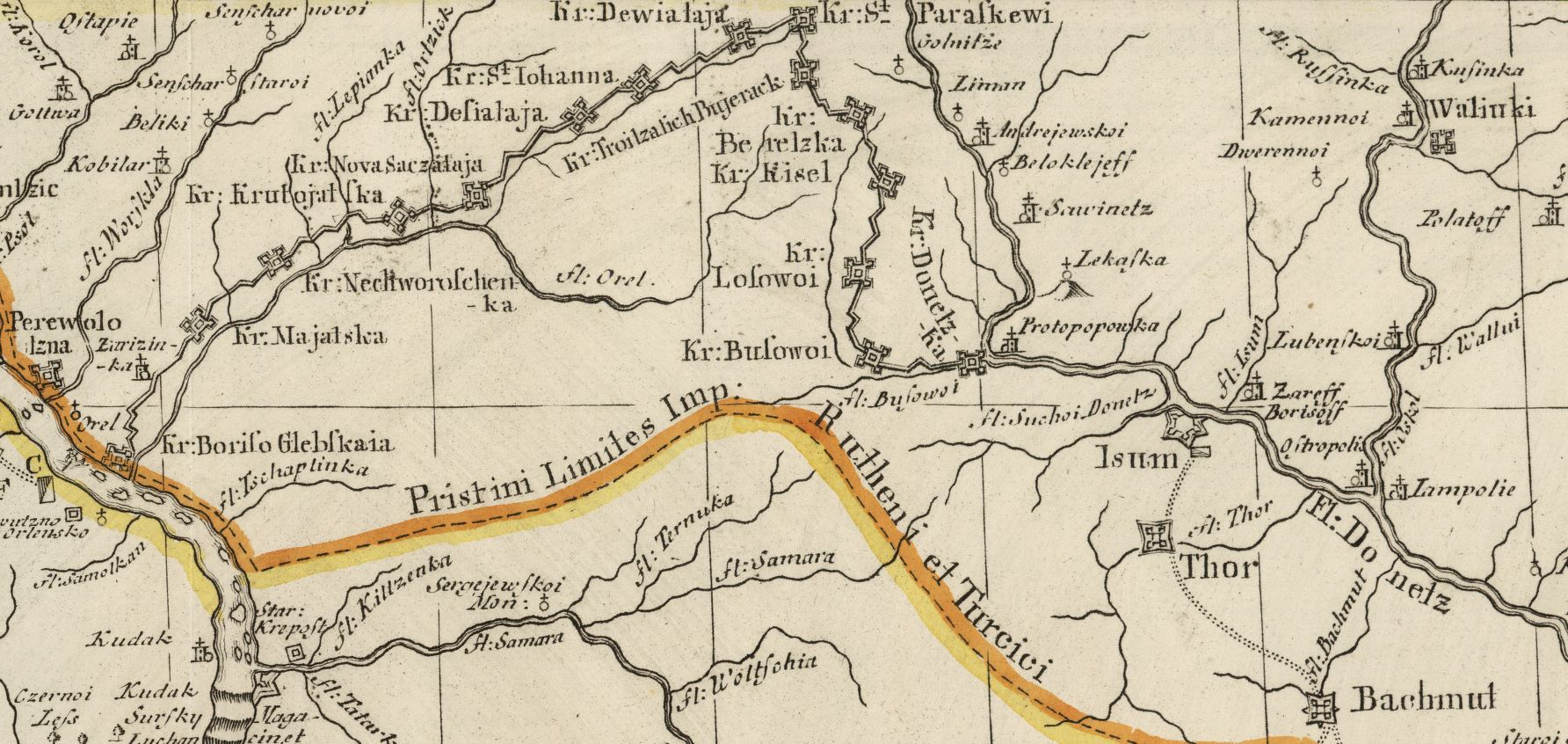
Kr. Desiataja (Tenth Fortress) of the Ukrainian line

The city of Krasnohrad was founded as a Bilevska fortress in 1731–1733, as part of the Ukrainian line defence fortifications, which ran from the Dnieper to the Donets. The name Bilevska (Belyovskaya) is derived from an occupation force from Belyov, which was used in the construction of the Ukrainian line.

In 1784, the fortress received the name Konstantinograd (Kostiantynohrad) in honour of Grand Duke Konstantin Pavlovich of Russia. In 1797, it received city status. In 1922, Kostyantynohrad was renamed Krasnohrad during a "de-imperialization" drive carried out by the Soviet Union.

It is located on the Berestova River 101 kilometres (63 mi) to the south of the city of Kharkiv. In 2021, about 20,000 people lived in the city.

On 3 April 2024, the Committee on the Organization of State Power, Local Self-government, Regional Development, and Urban Planning in the Verkhovna Rada stated their support for renaming the city to Berestyn. On 19 September 2024, the Verkhovna Rada voted to rename Krasnohrad to Berestyn.

== Population ==
=== Ethnicity ===
Distribution of the population by ethnicity according to the 2001 census:

Ethnic groups in Krasnohrad
	percent
Ukrainians	79.69%
Russians	18.49%
Belarusians	0.54%
Armenians	0.21%
Azerbaijanis	0.17%
Tatars	0.14%
Georgians	0.11%

=== Language ===
Distribution of the population by native language according to the 2001 census:

Language	Percentage
Ukrainian	77.78%
Russian	21.52%
other/undecided	0.7%

== Geography ==
=== Climate ===
Climate data for Krasnohrad (1981–2010)
Month	Jan	Feb	Mar	Apr	May	Jun	Jul	Aug	Sep	Oct	Nov	Dec	Year
Mean daily maximum °C (°F)	−2.0 (28.4)	−1.3 (29.7)	4.8 (40.6)	14.5 (58.1)	21.4 (70.5)	24.8 (76.6)	26.9 (80.4)	26.4 (79.5)	20.2 (68.4)	12.6 (54.7)	4.1 (39.4)	−0.8 (30.6)	12.6 (54.7)
Daily mean °C (°F)	−4.5 (23.9)	−4.3 (24.3)	1.0 (33.8)	9.3 (48.7)	15.8 (60.4)	19.3 (66.7)	21.3 (70.3)	20.5 (68.9)	14.8 (58.6)	8.2 (46.8)	1.2 (34.2)	−3.3 (26.1)	8.3 (46.9)
Mean daily minimum °C (°F)	−6.9 (19.6)	−7.2 (19.0)	−2.2 (28.0)	4.7 (40.5)	10.3 (50.5)	14.1 (57.4)	16.1 (61.0)	15.1 (59.2)	10.1 (50.2)	4.5 (40.1)	−1.3 (29.7)	−5.7 (21.7)	4.3 (39.7)
Average precipitation mm (inches)	43.1 (1.70)	35.6 (1.40)	39.9 (1.57)	42.3 (1.67)	53.1 (2.09)	69.7 (2.74)	63.7 (2.51)	46.7 (1.84)	52.9 (2.08)	43.4 (1.71)	45.4 (1.79)	40.9 (1.61)	576.7 (22.70)
Average precipitation days (≥ 1.0 mm)	8.9	7.6	8.2	7.0	7.6	8.3	7.6	5.2	6.4	6.2	7.5	8.2	88.7
Average relative humidity (%)	86.3	83.3	78.1	66.0	60.9	66.0	66.1	62.5	69.8	77.3	86.1	87.2	74.1
Source: World Meteorological Organization

== Notable people ==
- Andriy Lunin (born 1999) – Ukrainian footballer, currently plays for La Liga club Real Madrid, made 16 caps for the Ukrainian national team.
- Mykhailo Mudryk (born 2001) – Ukrainian footballer, former Shakhtar Donetsk player, currently plays for Premier League club Tottenham Hotspur F.C., made 28 caps for the Ukrainian national team.
- Roman Kryklia: (born 1991) - Ukrainian heavyweight kickboxer and Muay Thai practitioner currently competing in the Light Heavyweight and Heavyweight divisions of ONE Championship
