= Administrative divisions of Vinnytsia Oblast =

Vinnytsia Oblast is subdivided into districts (raions) which are subdivided into municipalities (hromadas).

== Current ==
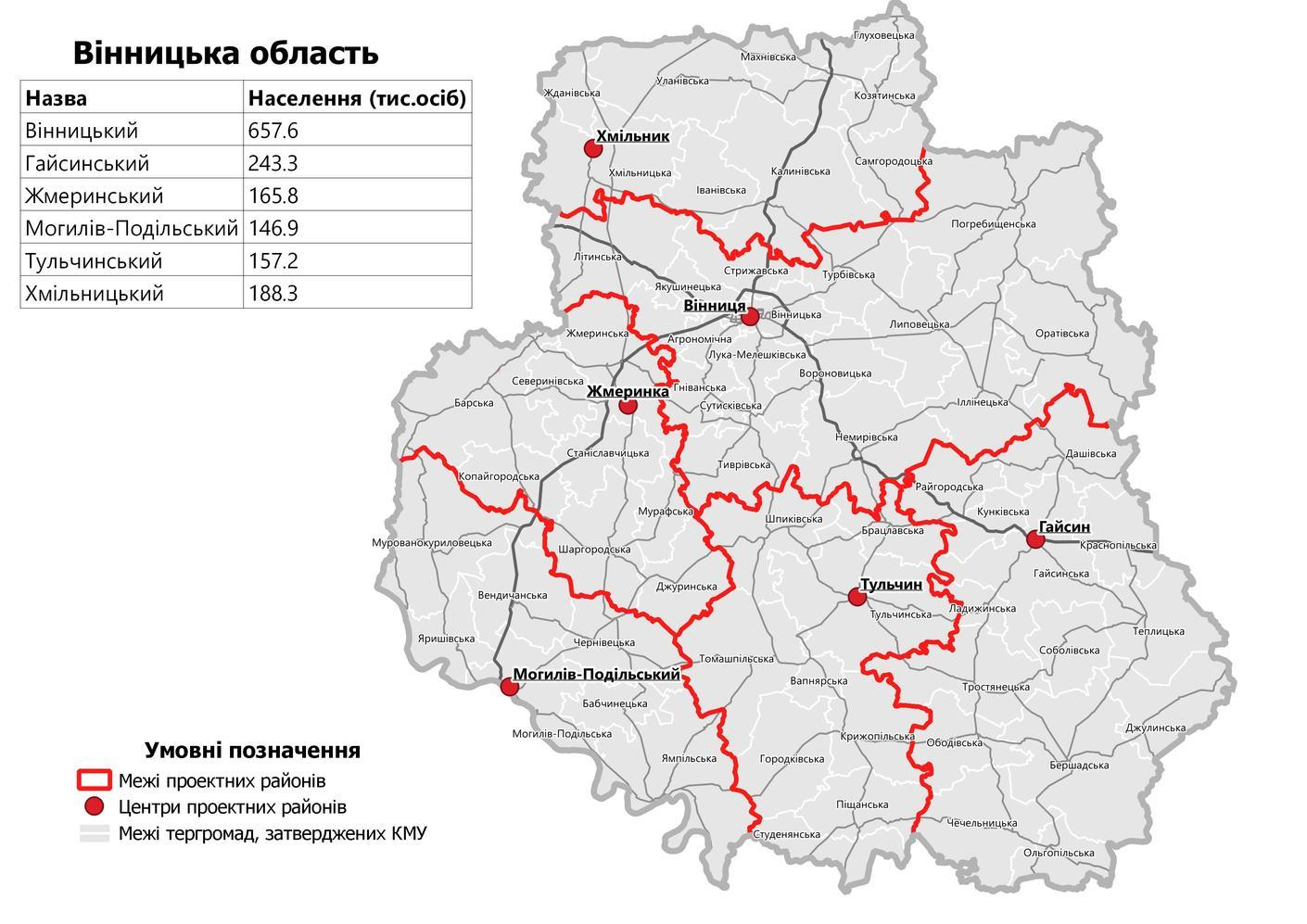
Raions of Vinnytsia Oblast as of August 2020.

On 18 July 2020, the number of districts was reduced to six. These are:

1. Haisyn (Гайсинський район), the center is in the city of Haisyn;
2. Khmilnyk (Хмільницький район), the center is in the city of Khmilnyk;
3. Mohyliv-Podilskyi (Могилів-Подільський район), the center is in the city of Mohyliv-Podilskyi;
4. Tulchyn (Тульчинський район), the center is in the city of Tulchyn;
5. Vinnytsia (Вінницький район), the center is in the city of Vinnytsia;
6. Zhmerynka (Жмеринський район), the center is in the city of Zhmerynka.

**Vinnytsia Oblast**
As of January 1, 2022
Number of districts (raions)	6
Number of municipalities (hromadas)	63

=== Communities (hromadas) per District (raion) ===
In bold are communities (hromadas) with cities

Haisyn Raion

- **Bershad**
- Chechelnyk
- Dashiv
- Dzhulynka
- **Haisyn**
- Krasnopilka
- Kunka
- **Ladyzhyn**
- Obodivka
- Olhopil
- Raihorod
- Sobolivka
- Teplyk
- Trostianets

Khmilnyk Raion

- Hlukhivtsi
- Ivaniv
- **Kalynivka**
- **Khmilnyk**
- **Koziatyn**
- Makhnivka
- Samhorodok
- Ulaniv
- Viytivtsi

Mohyliv-Podilskyi Raion

- Babchyntsi
- Chernivtsi
- **Mohyliv-Podilskyi**
- Murovani Kurylivtsi
- Vendychany
- **Yampil**
- Yaryshiv

Tulchyn Raion

- Bratslav
- Horodkivka
- Kryzhopil
- Pishchanka
- Shpykiv
- Studena
- Tomashpil
- **Tulchyn**
- Vapniarka

Vinnytsia Raion

- Ahronomichne
- **Hnivan**
- **Illintsi**
- Lityn
- Luka-Meleshkivska
- **Lypovets**
- **Nemyriv**
- Orativ
- **Pohrebyshche**
- Stryzhavka
- Sutysky
- Turbiv
- Tyvriv
- **Vinnytsia**
- Voronovytsia
- Yakushyntsi

Zhmerynka Raion

- **Bar**
- Dzhuryn
- Kopaihorod
- Murafa
- Severynivka
- **Sharhorod**
- Stanislavchyk
- **Zhmerynka**

== Administrative divisions until 2020 ==
Raions of Vinnytsia Oblast as of June 2020. The city of Vinnytsia is shown in dark blue.

Before 2020, Vinnytsia Oblast was subdivided into 33 regions: 27 districts (raions) and 6 city municipalities (mis'krada or misto), officially known as territories governed by city councils.

- City municipalities:
  - Vinnytsia (Вінниця), the administrative center of the oblast
  - Khmilnyk (Хмільник)
  - Koziatyn Municipality
    - Cities under the city's jurisdiction:
      - Koziatyn (Козятин)
    - Urban-type settlements under the city's jurisdiction:
      - Zaliznychne (Залізничне)
  - Ladyzhyn Municipality
    - Cities under the city's jurisdiction:
      - Ladyzhyn (Ладижин)
  - Mohyliv-Podilskyi Municipality
    - Cities under the city's jurisdiction:
      - Mohyliv-Podilskyi (Могилів-Подільський)
  - Zhmerynka (Жмеринка)
- Districts (raions):
  - Bar (Барський район)
    - Cities under the district's jurisdiction:
      - Bar (Бар)
    - Urban-type settlements under the district's jurisdiction:
      - Kopaihorod (Копайгород)
  - Bershad (Бершадський район)
    - Cities under the district's jurisdiction:
      - Bershad (Бершадь)
  - Chechelnyk (Чечельницький район)
    - Urban-type settlements under the district's jurisdiction:
      - Chechelnyk (Чечельник)
  - Chernivtsi (Чернівецький район)
    - Urban-type settlements under the district's jurisdiction:
      - Chernivtsi (Чернівці)
  - Haisyn (Гайсинський район)
    - Cities under the district's jurisdiction:
      - Haisyn (Гайсин)
  - Illintsi (Іллінецький район)
    - Cities under the district's jurisdiction:
      - Illintsi (Іллінці)
    - Urban-type settlements under the district's jurisdiction:
      - Dashiv (Дашів)
  - Kalynivka (Калинівський район)
    - Cities under the district's jurisdiction:
      - Kalynivka (Калинівка)
  - Khmilnyk (Хмільницький район)
  - Koziatyn (Козятинський район)
    - Urban-type settlements under the district's jurisdiction:
      - Brodetske (Бродецьке)
      - Hlukhivtsi (Глухівці)
  - Kryzhopil (Крижопільський район)
    - Urban-type settlements under the district's jurisdiction:
      - Kryzhopil (Крижопіль)
  - Lypovets (Липовецький район)
    - Cities under the district's jurisdiction:
      - Lypovets (Липовець)
    - Urban-type settlements under the district's jurisdiction:
      - Turbiv (Турбів)
  - Lityn (Літинський район)
    - Urban-type settlements under the district's jurisdiction:
      - Lityn (Літин)
  - Mohyliv-Podilskyi (Могилів-Подільський район)
    - Urban-type settlements under the district's jurisdiction:
      - Vendychany (Вендичани)
  - Murovani Kurylivtsi (Мурованокуриловецький район)
    - Urban-type settlements under the district's jurisdiction:
      - Murovani Kurylivtsi (Муровані Курилівці)
  - Nemyriv (Немирівський район)
    - Cities under the district's jurisdiction:
      - Nemyriv (Немирів)
    - Urban-type settlements under the district's jurisdiction:
      - Bratslav (Брацлав)
      - Sytkivtsi (Ситківці)
  - Orativ (Оратівський район)
    - Urban-type settlements under the district's jurisdiction:
      - Orativ (Оратів)
  - Pishchanka (Піщанський район)
    - Urban-type settlements under the district's jurisdiction:
      - Pishchanka (Піщанка)
      - Rudnytsia (Рудниця)
  - Pohrebyshche (Погребищенський район)
    - Cities under the district's jurisdiction:
      - Pohrebyshche (Погребище)
  - Sharhorod (Шаргородський район)
    - Cities under the district's jurisdiction:
      - Sharhorod (Шаргород)
  - Teplyk (Теплицький район)
    - Urban-type settlements under the district's jurisdiction:
      - Teplyk (Теплик)
  - Tomashpil (Томашпільський район)
    - Urban-type settlements under the district's jurisdiction:
      - Tomashpil (Томашпіль)
      - Vapniarka (Вапнярка)
  - Trostianets (Тростянецький район)
    - Urban-type settlements under the district's jurisdiction:
      - Trostianets (Тростянець)
  - Tulchyn (Тульчинський район)
    - Cities under the district's jurisdiction:
      - Tulchyn (Тульчин)
    - Urban-type settlements under the district's jurisdiction:
      - Kyrnasivka (Кирнасівка)
      - Shpykiv (Шпиків)
  - Tyvriv (Тиврівський район)
    - Cities under the district's jurisdiction:
      - Hnivan (Гнівань)
    - Urban-type settlements under the district's jurisdiction:
      - Sutysky (Сутиски)
      - Tyvriv (Тиврів)
  - Vinnytsia (Вінницький район)
    - Urban-type settlements under the district's jurisdiction:
      - Desna (Десна)
      - Stryzhavka (Стрижавка)
      - Voronovytsia (Вороновиця)
  - Yampil (Ямпільський район)
    - Cities under the district's jurisdiction:
      - Yampil (Ямпіль)
  - Zhmerynka (Жмеринський район)
    - Urban-type settlements under the district's jurisdiction:
      - Brailiv (Браїлів)
