= Brodetske, Vinnytsia Oblast =

Rural locality in Vinnytsia Oblast, Ukraine

Brodetske Бродецьке
- Rural settlement
- Location in Vinnytsia Oblast Location in Ukraine
- Country: Ukraine
- Oblast: Vinnytsia Oblast
- Raion: Khmilnyk Raion

Population (2022)
  - Total: ▼2,032
- Time zone: UTC+2 (EET)
  - Summer (DST): UTC+3 (EEST)

Brodetske (Ukrainian: Бродецьке) is a rural settlement in Khmilnyk Raion, Vinnytsia Oblast, Ukraine. It is located on the banks of the Hnylopiat, a left tributary of the Teteriv in the drainage basin of the Dnieper. Brodetske belongs to Hlukhivtsi settlement hromada, one of the hromadas of Ukraine. Population: 2,032 (2022 estimate).

== History ==
Until 18 July 2020, Brodetske belonged to Koziatyn Raion. The raion was abolished in July 2020 as part of the administrative reform of Ukraine, which reduced the number of raions of Vinnytsia Oblast to six. The area of Koziatyn Raion was merged into Khmilnyk Raion.

Until 26 January 2024, Brodetske was designated urban-type settlement. On this day, a new law entered into force which abolished this status, and Brodetske became a rural settlement.

== Economy ==
=== Transportation ===
The closest railway stations are in Hlukhivtsi, approximately 5 kilometres (3.1 mi) to the east, on the railway connecting Berdychiv and Koziatyn.

The settlement is on Highway M21 which connects Vinnytsia and Zhytomyr.
