= Sutysky, Vinnytsia Oblast =

Rural locality in Vinnytsia Oblast, Ukraine

Sutysky Сутиски
- Rural settlement
- Location in Vinnytsia Oblast Location in Ukraine
- Country: Ukraine
- Oblast: Vinnytsia Oblast
- Raion: Vinnytsia Raion

Population (2022)
  - Total: 5,877
- Time zone: UTC+2 (EET)
  - Summer (DST): UTC+3 (EEST)

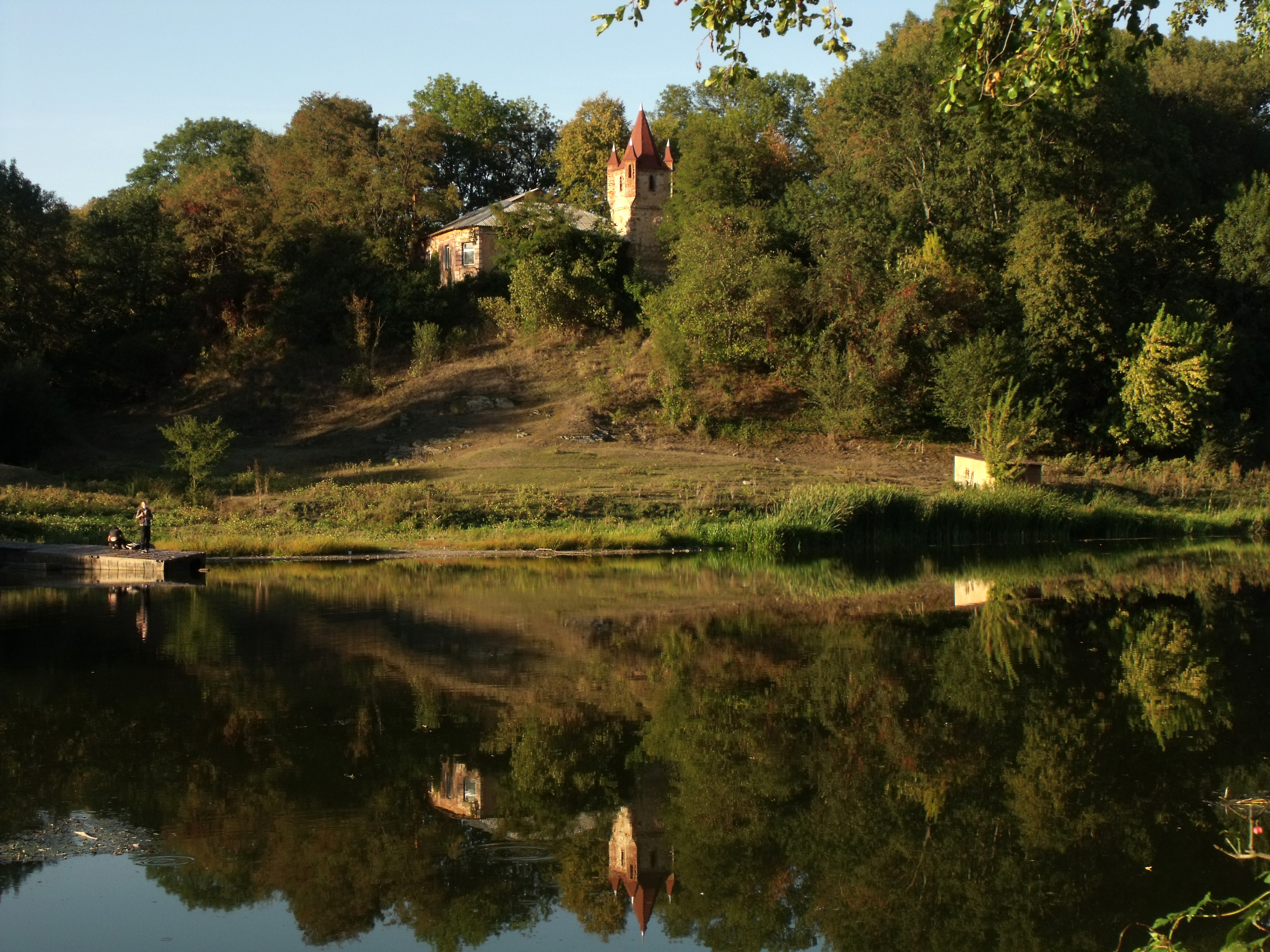
Heyden Manor Park, Sutysky village, Vinnytsia district

Sutysky (Ukrainian: Сутиски) is a rural settlement in Vinnytsia Raion of Vinnytsia Oblast in Ukraine. It is located on the left bank of the Southern Bug. Sutysky hosts the administration of Sutysky settlement hromada, one of the hromadas of Ukraine. Population: 5,877 (2022 estimate)

== History ==
Until 18 July 2020, Sutysky belonged to Tyvriv Raion. The raion was abolished in July 2020 as part of the administrative reform of Ukraine, which reduced the number of raions of Vinnytsia Oblast to six. The area of Tyvriv Raion was merged into Vinnytsia Raion.

Until 26 January 2024, Sutysky was designated urban-type settlement. On this day, a new law entered into force which abolished this status, and Sutysky became a rural settlement.

== Economy ==
=== Transportation ===
The closest railway station is in Hnivan, about 10 kilometres (6.2 mi) northwest. It is on the railway connecting Vinnytsia and Zhmerynka. There is intensive passenger traffic.

The settlement is connected by road with Hinvan and Tyvriv where it has further connections to Vinnytsia and Nemyriv.
