= Zaliznychne, Vinnytsia Oblast =

Rural locality in Vinnytsia Oblast, Ukraine

Zaliznychne Залізничне
- Rural settlement
- Location in Vinnytsia Oblast Location in Ukraine
- Country: Ukraine
- Oblast: Vinnytsia Oblast
- Raion: Khmilnyk Raion

Population (2022)
  - Total: 966
- Time zone: UTC+2 (EET)
  - Summer (DST): UTC+3 (EEST)

Zaliznychne (Ukrainian: Залізничне) is a rural settlement in Khmilnyk Raion, Vinnytsia Oblast, Ukraine. It is located in the north of the oblast, some 70 kilometres (43 mi) north-east of Vinnytsia. Zaliznychne belongs to Koziatyn urban hromada, one of the hromadas of Ukraine. Population: 966 (2022 estimate).

== History ==
Until 18 July 2020, Zaliznychne belonged to Koziatyn Municipality. The municipality as an administrative unit was abolished in July 2020 as part of the administrative reform of Ukraine, which reduced the number of raions of Vinnytsia Oblast to six. The area of Koziatyn Municipality was merged into Khmilnyk Raion.

Until 26 January 2024, Zaliznychne was designated urban-type settlement. On this day, a new law entered into force which abolished this status, and Zaliznychne became a rural settlement.

== Economy ==
=== Transportation ===
Zaliznychne railway station is located in the settlement, on the railway connecting Berdychiv and Koziatyn. There is infrequent passenger traffic.

The settlement has access to Highway M21 which connects Vinnytsia and Zhytomyr, as well as to Highway H02 connecting Kremenets and Bila Tserkva.
