= Hlukhivtsi, Vinnytsia Oblast =

Rural locality in Vinnytsia Oblast, Ukraine

Hlukhivtsi Глухівці
- Rural settlement
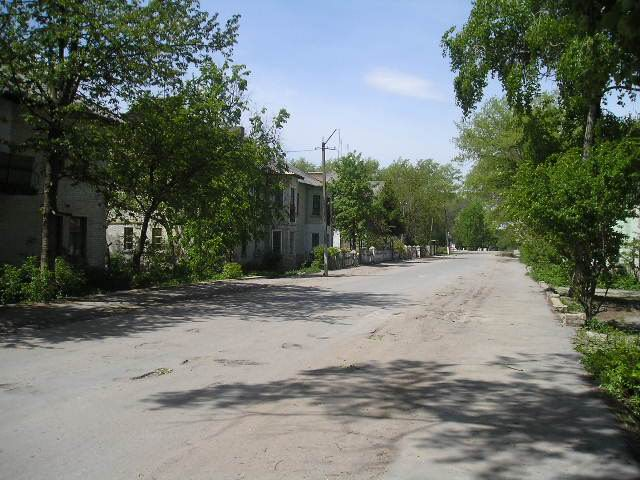

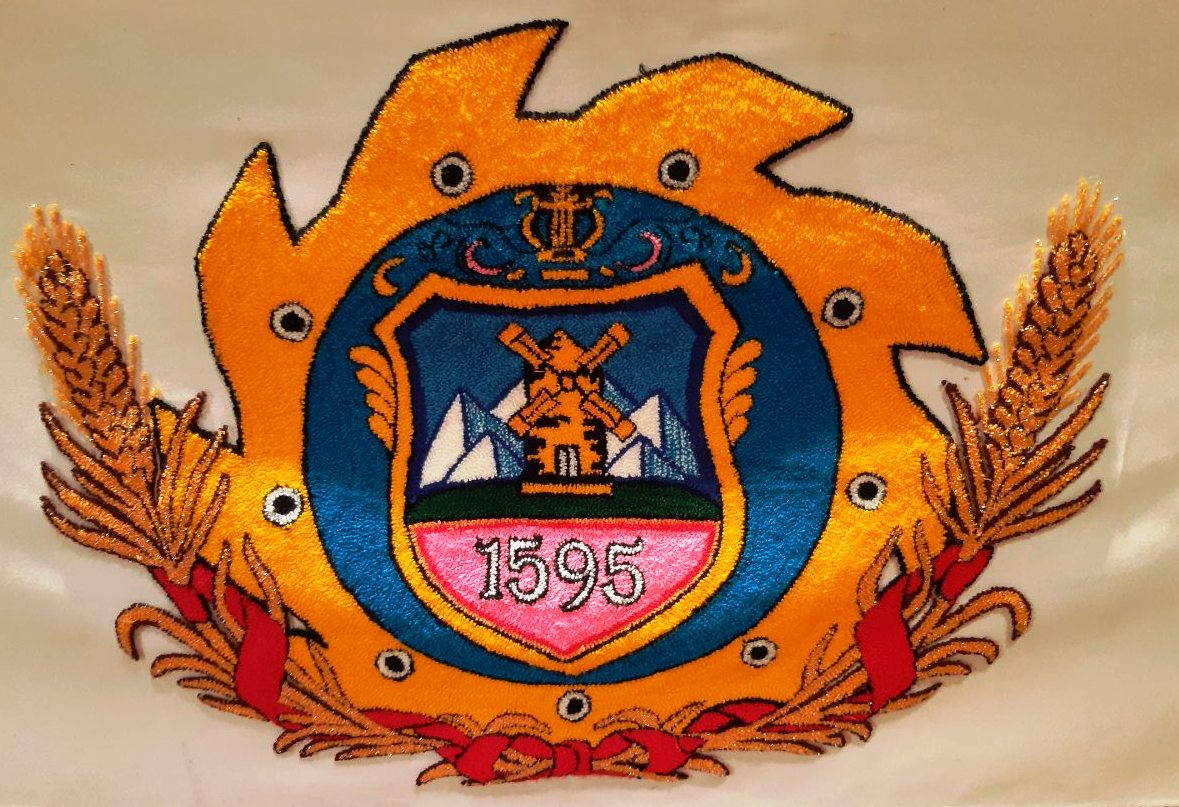
- Seal

- Location in Vinnytsia Oblast Location in Ukraine
- Coordinates: 49°46′17″N 28°44′24″E
- Country: Ukraine
- Oblast: Vinnytsia Oblast
- Raion: Khmilnyk Raion
- Hromada: Hlukhivtsi settlement hromada

Population (2022)
  - Total: 3,097
- Time zone: UTC+2 (EET)
  - Summer (DST): UTC+3 (EEST)

Hlukhivtsi (Ukrainian: Глухівці) is a rural settlement in Khmilnyk Raion, Vinnytsia Oblast, Ukraine. It is located in the north of the oblast, some 70 kilometres (43 mi) north-east of Vinnytsia. Hlukhivtsi hosts the administration of Hlukhivtsi settlement hromada, one of the hromadas of Ukraine. Population: 3,097 (2022 estimate).

== History ==
Until 18 July 2020, Hlukhivtsi belonged to Koziatyn Raion. The raion was abolished in July 2020 as part of the administrative reform of Ukraine, which reduced the number of raions of Vinnytsia Oblast to six. The area of Koziatyn Raion was merged into Khmilnyk Raion.

Until 26 January 2024, Hlukhivtsi was designated urban-type settlement. On this day, a new law entered into force which abolished this status, and Hlukhivtsi became a rural settlement.

== Economy ==
=== Transportation ===
Kaolinova railway station is located in the settlement, on the railway connecting Berdychiv and Koziatyn. There is infrequent passenger traffic.

The settlement has access to Highway M21 which connects Vinnytsia and Zhytomyr.
