= Sytkivtsi =

Rural locality in Vinnytsia Oblast, Ukraine

Sytkivtsi Ситківці
- Rural settlement
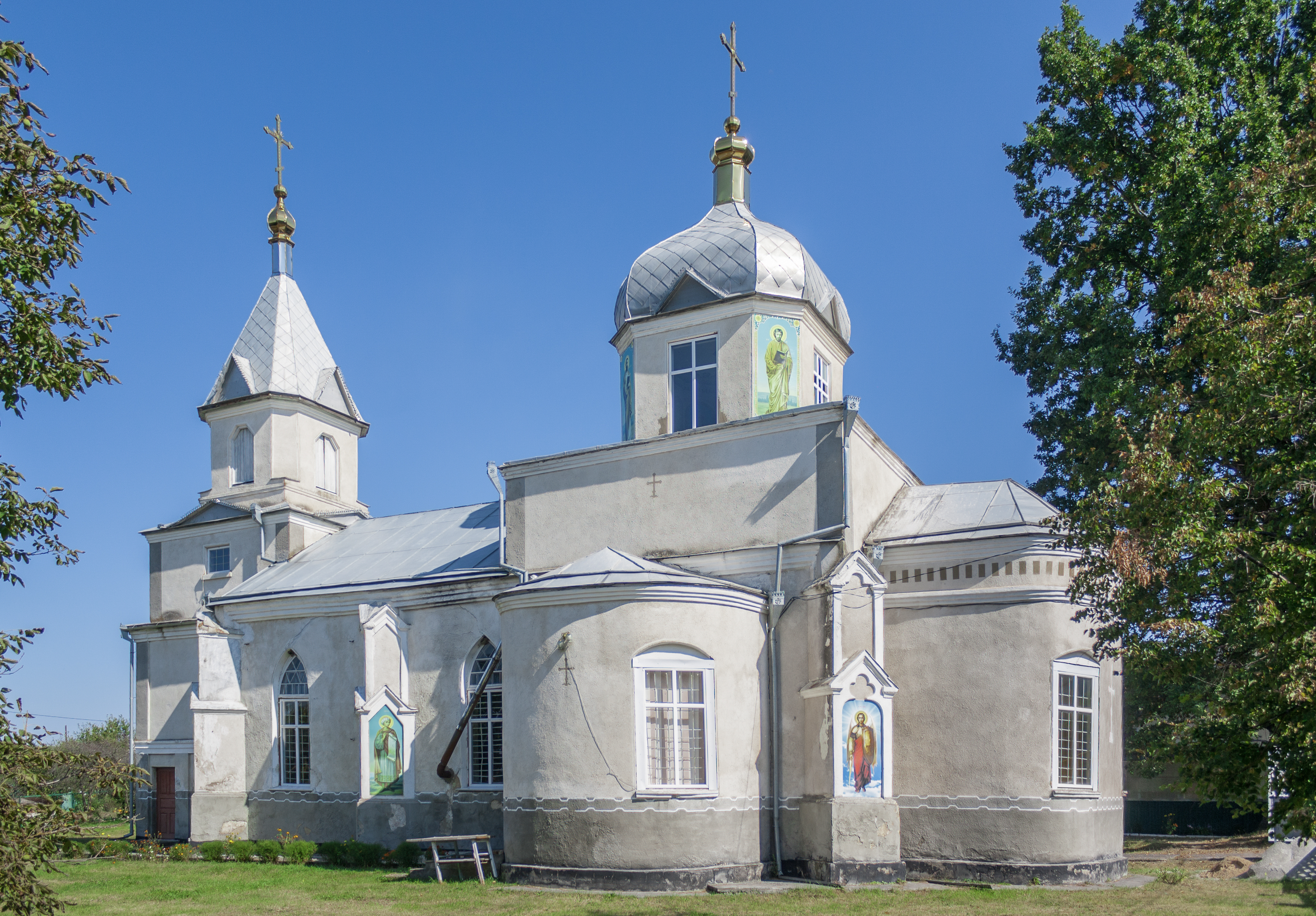
- Church of the Ascension

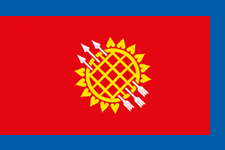
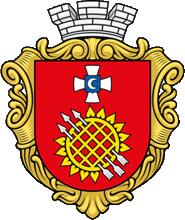
- Flag Coat of arms

- Location in Vinnytsia Oblast Location in Ukraine
- Country: Ukraine
- Oblast: Vinnytsia Oblast
- Raion: Haisyn Raion
- Hromada: Raihorod rural hromada

Population (2022)
  - Total: 2,155
- Time zone: UTC+2 (EET)
  - Summer (DST): UTC+3 (EEST)

Sytkivtsi (Ukrainian: Ситківці) is a rural settlement in Haisyn Raion of Vinnytsia Oblast in Ukraine. It is located approximately 80 miles (130 km) southeast of the city of Vinnytsia. Sytkivtsi belongs to Raihorod rural hromada, one of the hromadas of Ukraine. Population: 2,155 (2022 estimate)

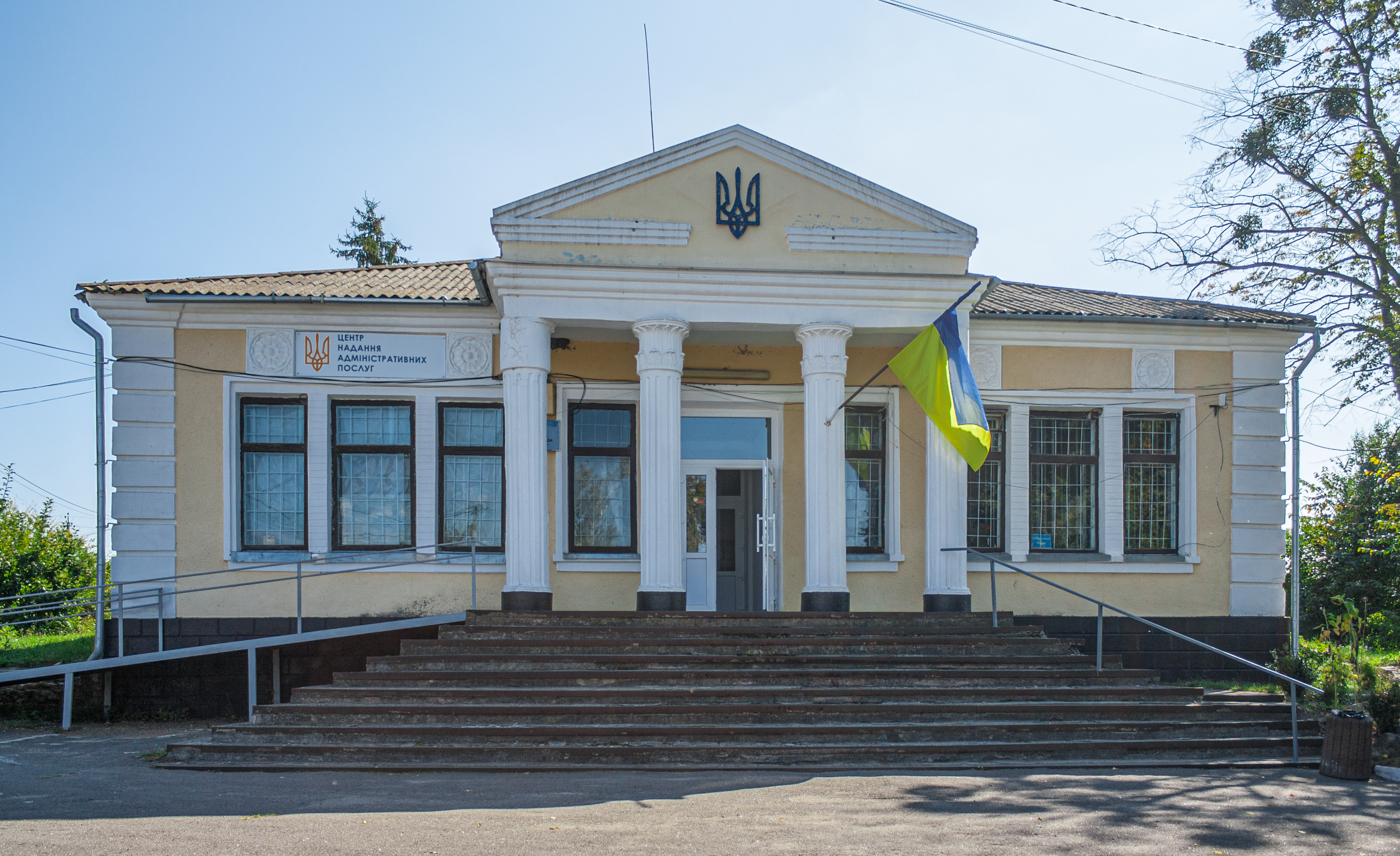
Village council

Until 18 July 2020, Sytkivtsi belonged to Nemyriv Raion. The raion was abolished in July 2020 as part of the administrative reform of Ukraine, which reduced the number of raions of Vinnytsia Oblast to six. The area of Nemyriv Raion was split between Haisyn, Tulchyn, and Vinnytsia Raions, with Sytkivtsi being transferred to Haisyn Raion.

Until 26 January 2024, Sytkivtsi was designated urban-type settlement. On this day, a new law entered into force which abolished this status, and Sytkivtsi became a rural settlement.

== Economy ==
=== Transportation ===
Sytkivtsi railway station is on the railway line connecting Vinnytsia and Haisyn. There is infrequent passenger traffic.

The settlement has access to M30 highway which connects Vinnytsia and Kropyvnytskyi.
