= Stroińce =

Stroińce is the historic Polish name for the following villages:

- Stroiești, Transnistria in Moldova
- Strointsi, Vinnytsia Oblast in Ukraine
