= Rudnytsia =

Rural locality in Vinnytsia Oblast, Ukraine

Rudnytsia Рудниця
- Rural settlement
- Location in Vinnytsia Oblast Location in Ukraine
- Country: Ukraine
- Oblast: Vinnytsia Oblast
- Raion: Tulchyn Raion

Population (2022)
  - Total: 1,090
- Time zone: UTC+2 (EET)
  - Summer (DST): UTC+3 (EEST)

Rudnytsia (Ukrainian: Рудниця) is a rural settlement in Tulchyn Raion of Vinnytsia Oblast in Ukraine. It is located at the south of the oblast, about 120 kilometres (75 mi) south of the city of Vinnytsia. Rudnytsia belongs to Pishchanka settlement hromada, one of the hromadas of Ukraine. Population: 1,090 (2022 estimate)

== History ==
Until 18 July 2020, Rudnytsia belonged to Pishchanka Raion. The raion was abolished in July 2020 as part of the administrative reform of Ukraine, which reduced the number of raions of Vinnytsia Oblast to six. The area of Pishchanka Raion was merged into Tulchyn Raion.

Until 26 January 2024, Rudnytsia was designated urban-type settlement. On this day, a new law entered into force which abolished this status, and Rudnytsia became a rural settlement.

== Economy ==
=== Transportation ===
Rudnytsia railway station is located on the railway connecting Zhmerynka with Odesa and Pervomaisk. Rudnytsia is also a terminal station of a narrow-gauge railway line connecting it with Haivoron via Bershad. There is passenger traffic through the station.

The settlement is connected by road with Haisyn and Bershad, where it has further connections with Ukrainian road network.
