= Ostapkivtsi, Vinnytsia Oblast =

Village in Vinnytsia Oblast, Ukraine

Ostapkivtsi
- Village
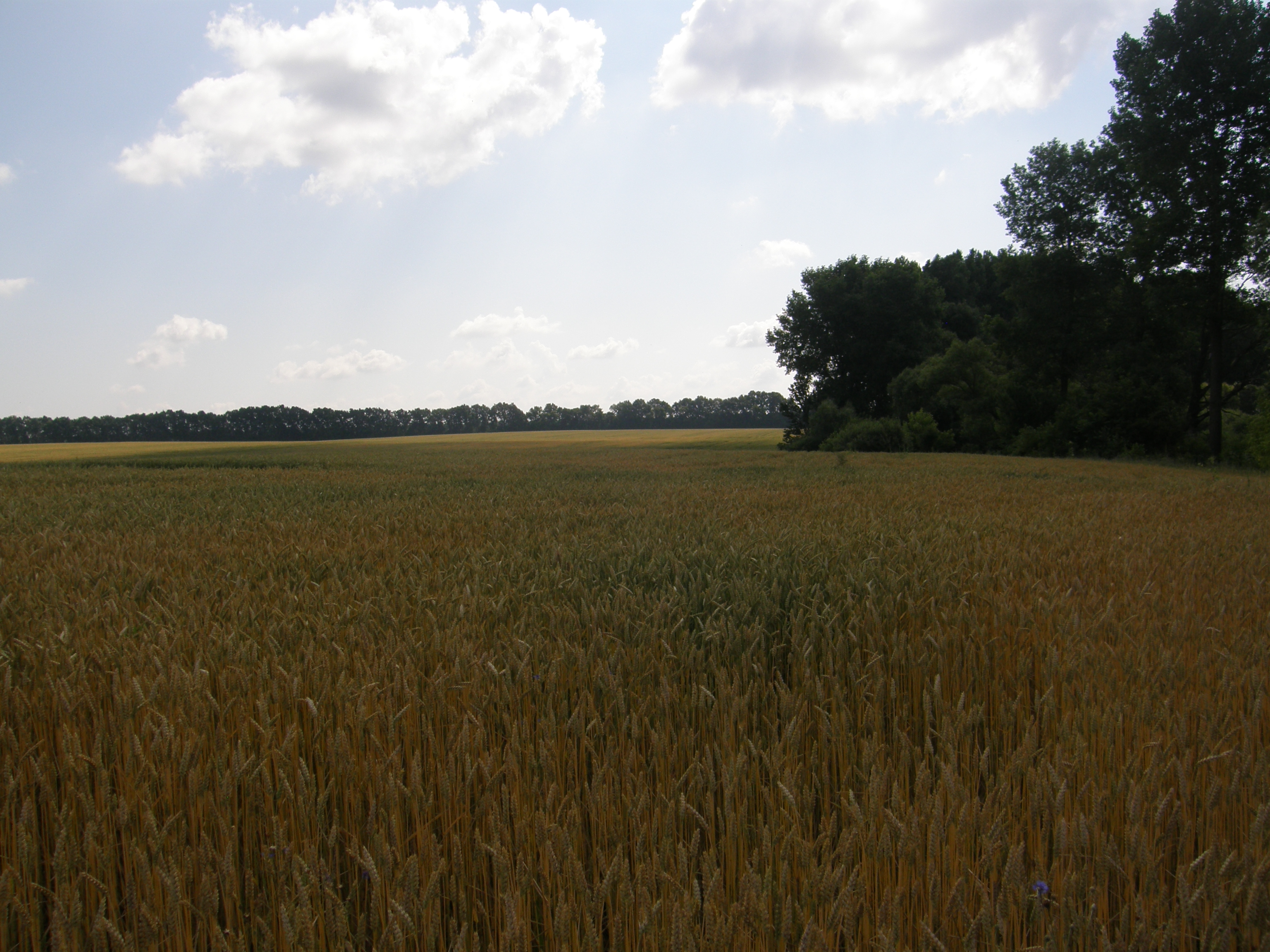

- Location within Ukraine
- Coordinates: 48°52′53″N 28°49′29″E
- Country: Ukraine
- Oblast: Vinnytsia
- Raion: Nemyriv
- Time zone: UTC+2 (EET)
  - Summer (DST): UTC+3 (EEST)

Ostapkivtsi (Ukrainian: Остапківці, Polish: Ostapkowce) is a village in Nemyriv Raion, Vinnytsia Oblast, Ukraine. It is situated on the Southern Bug River, in the historic region of Podolia.

== History ==
Ostapkowce was a private village of the Czetwertyński family, administratively located in the Bracław County in the Bracław Voivodeship in the Lesser Poland Province of the Kingdom of Poland. The Orthodox Church of the Exaltation of the Holy Cross was built in 1761. Local Roman Catholics belonged to the parish in Nemyriv. After the Partitions of Poland, it was located in the Bratslav uezd in the Podolia Governorate.
