= Tomashpil Raion =

Former subdivision of Vinnytsia Oblast, Ukraine

Tomashpil Raion Томашпільський район
- Raion
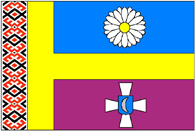
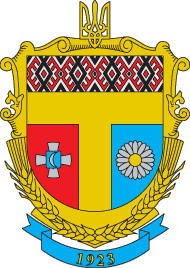
- Flag Coat of arms

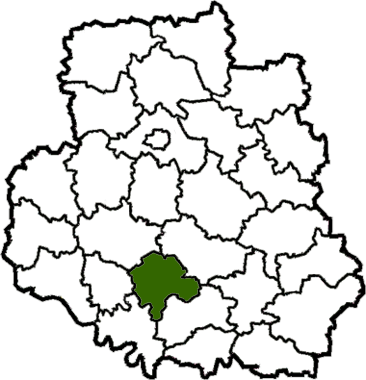
- Coordinates: 48°30′00″N 28°36′00″E
- Country: Ukraine
- Oblast: Vinnytsia Oblast
- Established: 1923
- Disestablished: 18 July 2020
- Admin. center: Tomashpil
- Subdivisions: List: 0 — city councils; 2 — settlement councils; 22 — rural councils; Number of localities: 0 — cities; 2 — urban-type settlements; 30 — villages; — rural settlements

Government
  - Governor: Oleksandr Korchovyi

Area
  - Total: 780 km^{2} (300 sq mi)

Population (2020)
  - Total: 31,944 ▼
  - Density: 41/km^{2} (110/sq mi)
- Time zone: UTC+02:00 (EET)
  - Summer (DST): UTC+03:00 (EEST)
- Postal index: 24200—24262
- Area code: +380 4348
- Website: http://tomrayrada.org.ua

Tomashpil Raion (Ukrainian: Томашпільський район) was one of raions of Vinnytsia Oblast, located in southwestern Ukraine. The administrative center of the raion was the urban-type settlement of Tomashpil. The raion was abolished and its territory was merged into Tulchyn Raion on 18 July 2020 as part of the administrative reform of Ukraine, which reduced the number of raions of Vinnytsia Oblast to six. The last estimate of the raion population was 31,944 (2020 est.).
