= Pishchanka =

Rural locality in Vinnytsia Oblast, Ukraine

Pishchanka Піщанка Piszczanka
- Rural settlement
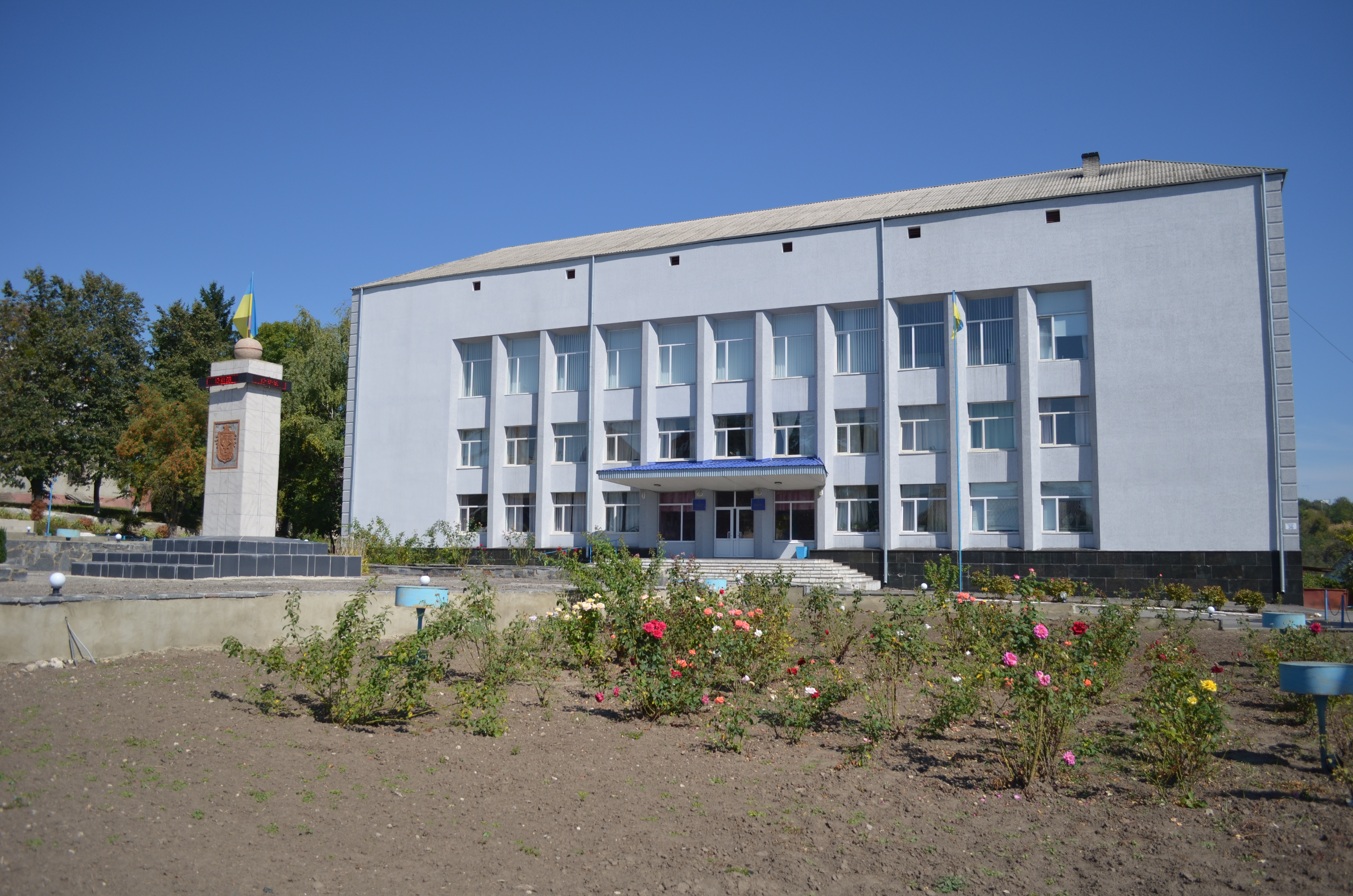

- Location within Vinnytsia Oblast Location within Ukraine
- Coordinates: 48°12′N 28°53′E
- Country: Ukraine
- Oblast: Vinnytsia Oblast
- Raion: Tulchyn Raion
- First mentioned: 1734

Area
  - Total: 7.47 km^{2} (2.88 sq mi)
- Elevation: 232 m (761 ft)

Population (2022)
  - Total: 5,137
  - Density: 688/km^{2} (1,780/sq mi)
- Time zone: UTC+2 (EET)
  - Summer (DST): UTC+3 (EEST)
- Postal code: 24700
- Area code: +380 4349

Pishchanka (Ukrainian: Піщанка, Polish: Piszczanka) is a rural settlement in Vinnytsia Oblast, located in the historic region of Podolia. It was formerly the administrative center of Pishchanka Raion, but is now administered within Tulchyn Raion. Since 1956 Pishchanka is an urban settlement. Population: 5,137 (2022 estimate)

== History ==
Until the Partitions of Poland Pishchanka was part of the Bracław Voivodeship of the Lesser Poland Province of the Polish Crown.

Until 26 January 2024, Pishchanka was designated urban-type settlement. On this day, a new law entered into force which abolished this status, and Pishchanka became a rural settlement.
