= Zhabokrych =

Village in Vinnytsia Oblast, Ukraine

Zhabokrych Жабокрич
- Village
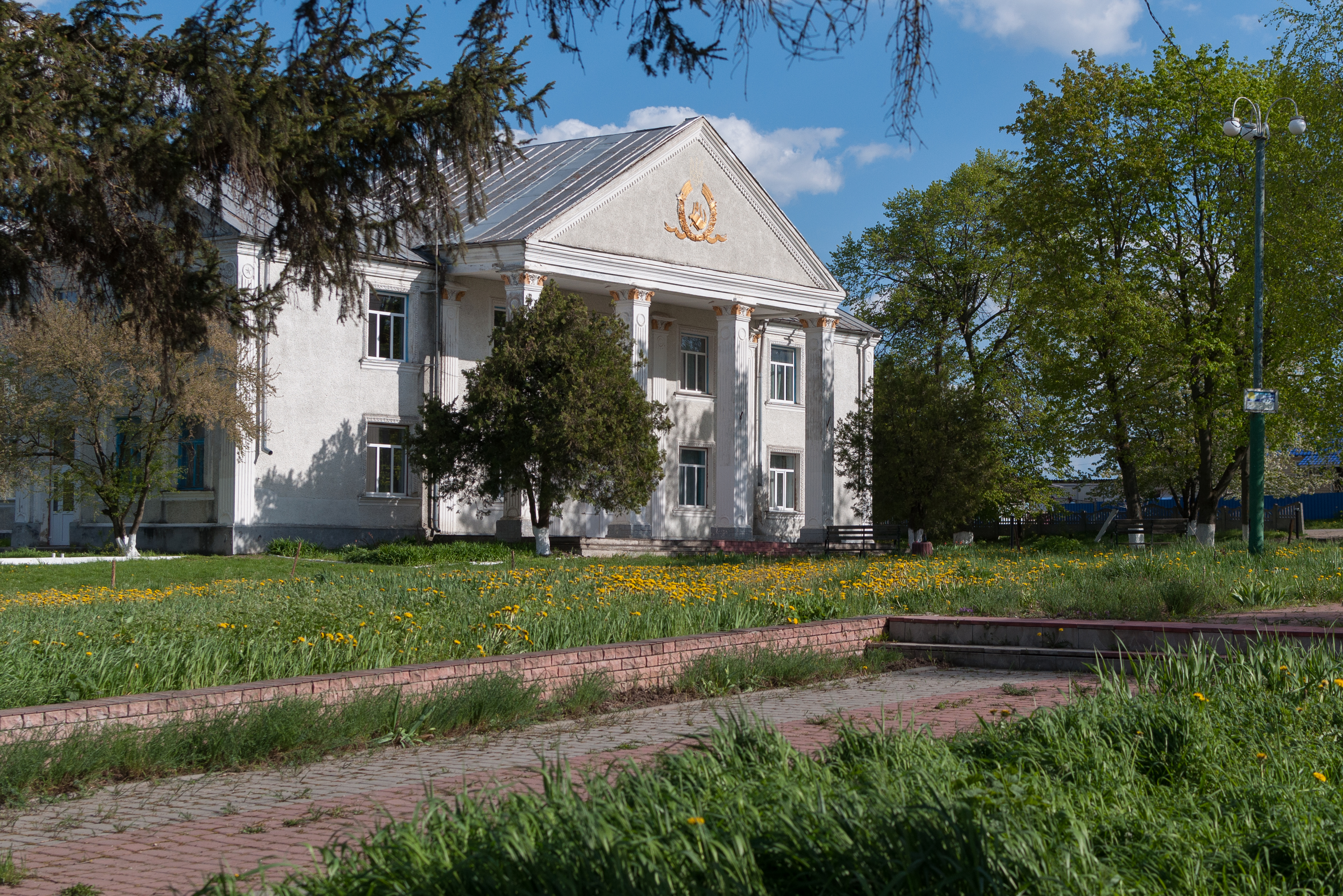
- Culture Center

- Location within Vinnytsia Oblast Location within Ukraine
- Coordinates: 48°23′0″N 28°59′00″E
- Country: Ukraine
- Oblast: Vinnytsia Oblast
- Raion: Tulchyn Raion
- Hromada: Kryzhopil settlement hromada
- Time zone: UTC+2 (EET)
  - Summer (DST): UTC+3 (EEST)
- Postal code: 24600
- Area code: +380 4374

Zhabokrych (Ukrainian: Жабокрич, Polish: Żabokrzycz) is a village in Ukraine's Podolia region in present-day Tulchyn Raion, Vinnytsia Oblast, about 290 kilometres (180 miles) northwest of Odesa. It is located in the historic region of Podolia, 11 kilometres (7 mi) from Kryzhopil.

The town name means frog croak and the climate is continental.

== History ==
Żabokrzycz, as it was called in Polish, was a private town of the Skarbek noble family, administratively located in the Bracław County in the Bracław Voivodeship in the Lesser Poland Province of the Kingdom of Poland. Following the Second Partition of Poland in 1793, it was annexed by Russia.

In the town square are many buildings remaining from early in the 20th century. Prior to World War II, it had a large Jewish community. A synagogue and Jewish cemetery still remain. There were massacres in July 1941 and in 1944.
