= Marusyne, Vinnytsia Oblast =

Village in Vinnytsia Oblast, Ukraine

Marusyne Марусине
- Village
- Location within Vinnytsia Oblast Location within Ukraine
- Country: Ukraine
- Oblast: Vinnytsia Oblast
- Raion: Tulchyn Raion
- Hromada: Tulchyn urban hromada

Population (2010)
  - Total: 5
- Postal code: 23608

Marusyne (Ukrainian: Марусине) is a village in Tulchyn Raion, Vinnytsia Oblast of Ukraine. As of 2010, there were 5 inhabitants. The village's postal code is 23608.
