= Tomashpil =

Rural locality in Vinnytsia Oblast, Ukraine

Tomashpil Томашпіль
- Rural settlement
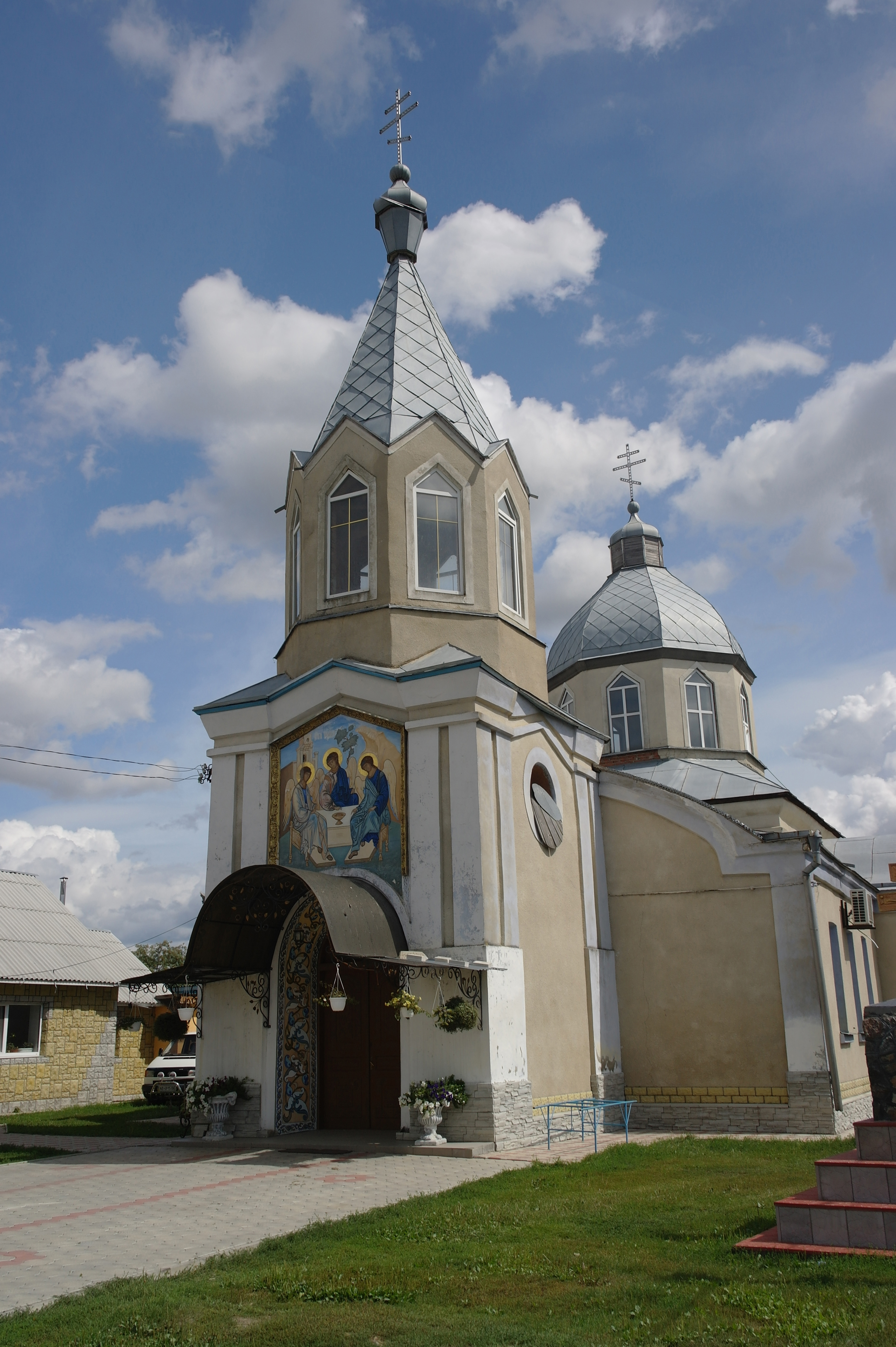
- Holy Trinity church

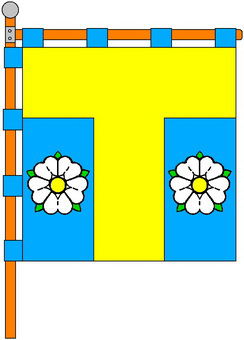
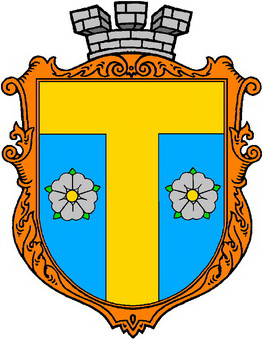
- Flag Coat of arms

- Location within Vinnytsia Oblast Location within Ukraine
- Coordinates: 48°32′42″N 28°30′50″E
- Country: Ukraine
- Oblast: Vinnytsia Oblast
- Raion: Tulchyn Raion
- Hromada: Tomashpil settlement hromada
- Founded: 1616

Area
  - Total: 3.46 km^{2} (1.34 sq mi)

Population (2022)
  - Total: 5,276
  - Density: 1,520/km^{2} (3,950/sq mi)
- Postal code: 24200
- Area code: +380 4348

Tomashpil (Ukrainian: Томашпіль, lit. 'city of St. Thomas', Polish: Tomaszpol) is a rural settlement in the eastern Podolia, specifically in Tulchyn Raion of Vinnytsia Oblast in central Ukraine. Tomashpil is situated on the banks of the Rusava River. Tomashpil is the administrative district of Tomashpil Raion (780 km^{2}), home to 40.608 people scattered over the town and 30 villages around. Population: 5,276 (2022 estimate)

The closest railway station is Vapniarka, 19 km away. It is accessible by taxi or a small bus called a 'Marshrutka'.

== History ==
The area of Tomashpil and all of Bratslav Voivodeship was part of the Grand Duchy of Lithuania until 1569. And in 1569 (with the Union of Lublin) it passed to the Polish kingdom. The first historical mention in the documents dates to 1616, when Tomashpil and the entire Podolia belonged to the Kingdom of Poland (Polish Crown). During Polish rule Tomshpil belonged to Braclaw Voivoidship. In 1793, during the Second Partition of Poland, Tomashpil and Eastern Podolia passed from Poland to the Russian Empire. It was part of short-lived Ukrainian National Republic (UNR) in 1917–1919. From 1922 until 1991 it was in the USSR (Ukrainian Soviet Socialist Republic). Since 1991 it has been a part of independent Ukraine.

The name Tomashpil stems from Polish name for Thomas—Tomasz, pronounced as "Tomash". The ending "pil" (-pol) is presumably from Greek "polis" (city) or Slavic "pole" (field).

Until 26 January 2024, Tomashpil was designated urban-type settlement. On this day, a new law entered into force which abolished this status, and Tomashpil became a rural settlement.

=== Jewish community ===
A Jewish community existed in Tomashpil from at least the 17th century. The community suffered during the Khmelnytsky Uprising of 1648–1649, but subsequently recovered; in 1765, 531 Jews were recorded in the town. By the 1897 census, Tomashpil had 4,515 Jewish residents out of a total population of 4,972. The community was again affected by pogroms during the Russian Civil War, in which hundreds of Jews were killed. During the Soviet period Tomashpil retained Jewish cultural institutions, including a Jewish elementary school, theatre, library and club. In 1939, 1,863 Jews lived in the town.

=== World War II and the Holocaust ===
The German invasion of the Soviet Union in June 1941 brought the Jewish community of Tomashpil under Axis occupation. Some Jewish men were mobilized into the Red Army, while others attempted to flee eastward; a number of those who fled were intercepted by German and Romanian forces and forced to return. German and Romanian troops occupied Tomashpil on 20 July 1941.

During the brief period of German military rule, Jews were subjected to identification measures, roundups and shootings. Six Jews were murdered within days of the occupation. In August 1941, German forces carried out a larger mass shooting at the Jewish cemetery outside the town. Sources give differing totals, ranging from approximately 150 to 300 victims; by 11 August, at least 157 Jews had been killed.

In September 1941, Tomashpil was transferred to Romanian civil administration and incorporated into the Transnistria Governorate, where its name was rendered as Tomașpol. Romanian authorities established a ghetto in the town for the surviving local Jews. Jews from nearby communities and deportees from northern Bessarabia were subsequently confined there as well. The ghetto existed from 1941 until March 1944.

Conditions in the ghetto were difficult, although Jewish communal institutions continued to function. Zalman Brofman served as head of the ghetto. Residents survived through barter, begging, assistance from local non-Jews and limited aid from Jewish relief organizations. Religious instruction continued privately, while Jewish women organized collections of food and other assistance for the sick and destitute.

Romanian authorities subjected able-bodied Jews to forced labour. Some worked in a quarry, sugar factory, agriculture, road and railway construction, snow clearing and other labour details. Workshops were also established for skilled workers, including tailors, furriers, dyers, blacksmiths, barbers and shoemakers; 54 Jews were employed in these workshops in October 1943.

Approximately 925 Jews were recorded in the ghetto in early 1942. By September 1943, Romanian records listed 33 deportees from Bessarabia and Bukovina there, in addition to the much larger population of local Ukrainian Jews; another wartime estimate placed the total ghetto population during 1943 at approximately 1,128.

Romanian occupation ended during the Soviet westward advance in March 1944. The Tomashpil ghetto ceased to exist when the Red Army recaptured the town, ending nearly three years of German and Romanian occupation.

== Economy ==
There is a sugar plant and textile industries in Tomashpil. A first sugar factory was built in 1857 but was set on fire in 1866. A new sugar factory was built in 1873, with status approved on 11 July 1875, whose director was the French engineer Louis Willaime (1846-1904). It is still operational 3 months out of the year when the sugar crop comes in. The biggest deposit of sawn stone in Ukraine is situated in Vinnytsia oblast 10 km from Tomashpil.

== Population ==
- 1970 – 2,100
- 1994 – 5,944

== Notable people ==
- Vladyslav Dubinchak (born 1998), Ukrainian footballer
