= Kyrnasivka =

Rural locality in Vinnytsia Oblast, Ukraine

Kyrnasivka Кирнасівка
- Rural settlement
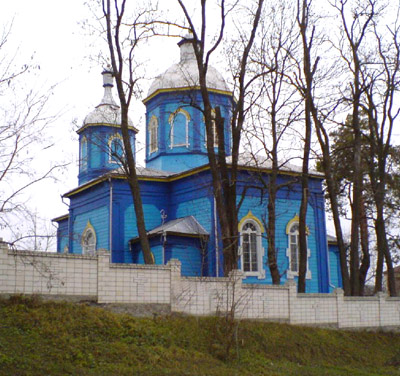
- The church in Kyrnasivka

- Location in Vinnytsia Oblast Location in Ukraine
- Country: Ukraine
- Oblast: Vinnytsia Oblast
- Raion: Tulchyn Raion

Population (2022)
  - Total: 4,828
- Time zone: UTC+2 (EET)
  - Summer (DST): UTC+3 (EEST)

Kyrnasivka (Ukrainian: Кирнасівка) is a rural settlement in Tulchyn Raion of Vinnytsia Oblast in Ukraine. It is located on the banks of the Kozarykha, in the drainage basin of the Southern Bug. Kyrnasivka belongs to Tulchyn urban hromada, one of the hromadas of Ukraine. Population: 4,828 (2022 estimate)

== History ==
Until 26 January 2024, Kyrnasivka was designated urban-type settlement. On this day, a new law entered into force which abolished this status, and Kyrnasivka became a rural settlement.

== Economy ==
=== Transportation ===
Kyrnasivka railway station is on the railway connecting Vapniarka with Haisyn and Khrystynivka. There is infrequent passenger traffic, both local and long-distance.

The settlement has road access to Tulchyn and Trostianets, where it has further connections to Vinnytsia, Odesa, and Uman.
