= Chechelnyk =

Rural locality in Vinnytsia Oblast, Ukraine

Chechelnyk Чечельник
- Rural settlement
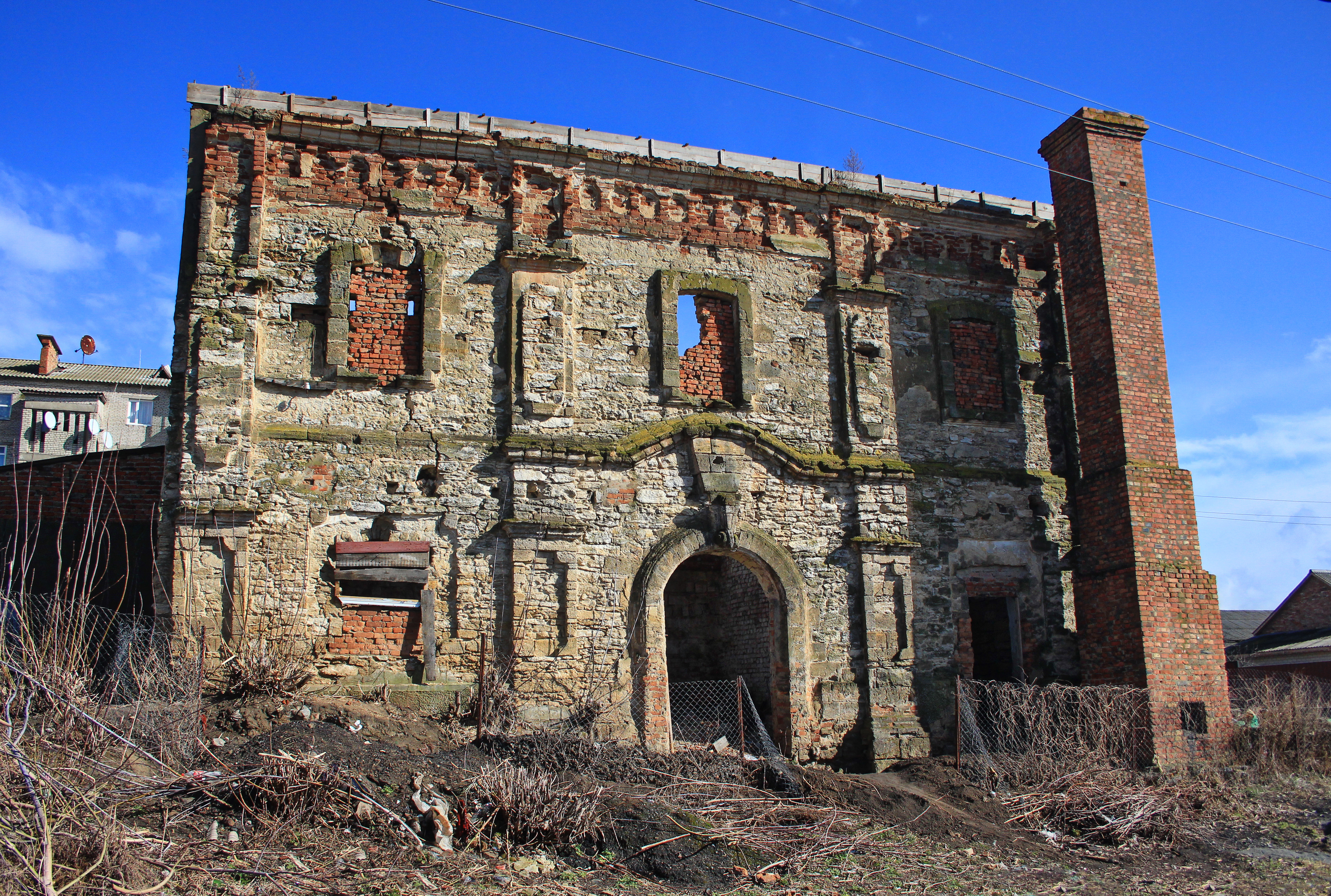
- The Synagogue of Chechelnyk, late 18th century

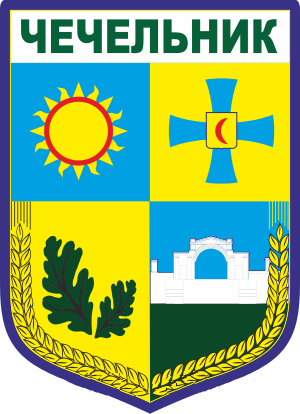
- Coat of arms
- Interactive map of Chechelnyk
- Location within Vinnytsia Oblast Location within Ukraine
- Coordinates: 48.217°N 29.350°E
- Country: Ukraine
- Oblast: Vinnytsia Oblast
- District: Haisyn Raion

Area
  - Total: 794 km^{2} (307 sq mi)

Population (2022)
  - Total: 4,785
  - Density: 6.03/km^{2} (15.6/sq mi)
- Time zone: UTC+2 (EET)
  - Summer (DST): UTC+3 (EEST)

Chechelnyk (earlier also Chichelnik; (Note: Alternate spellings: Chetschelnik, Chitchilnik, Cicelnic, Czeczelnik, Tschetschelnik, depending on the destination language.) Ukrainian: Чечельни́к [tʃetʃelʲˈnɪk]) is a rural settlement on the Savranka River (a tributary of the Southern Bug) in Vinnytsia Oblast, Ukraine, near Odesa Oblast, located in the historic region of Podolia. Chechelnyk was formerly the administrative center of Chechelnyk Raion, although it is now administrated under the Haisyn Raion. The economy is based on the food industry, especially alcohol production. Population: 4,785 (2022 estimate)

== History ==
Chechelnyk was founded "as a refuge from Tatars and landlords" in the early 16th century and achieved the status of a town in 1635. Until the Partitions of Poland Czeczelnik was part of the Bracław Voivodeship of the Lesser Poland Province. It was a private town of Poland, owned by the House of Lubomirski. The 5th Polish Vanguard Regiment was stationed in Czeczelnik in 1789, and the 2nd Polish Vanguard Regiment was stationed there in 1792.

Later it became part of the Podolian Governorate of the Russian Empire. Between 1795 and 1812 it was renamed Olgopil. In 1898 the population was 7,000, of whom 1,967 were Jews. Like most of Podolia, the town suffered terribly during the First World War and 1917-1921 Ukrainian War of Independence; during the summer of 1920, "the south of Podillya seethed with counterrevolution... and Olgopil County, where Chechelnyk is located, was the most unstable area in all of Podillya."

Until 26 January 2024, Chechelnyk was designated urban-type settlement. On this day, a new law entered into force which abolished this status, and Chechelnyk became a rural settlement.

== Jewish history ==
Chechelnyk had a substantial Jewish community by the nineteenth century. In 1898, 1,967 of the town's approximately 7,000 inhabitants were Jewish. Commerce was the principal occupation of the Jewish population, although hundreds worked as artisans, agricultural labourers and factory workers. The community maintained a private Jewish boys' school with about 100 pupils and 23 ḥadarim attended by 367 pupils.

The Jewish community was severely affected by violence during the Russian Civil War. On 15 May 1919, 17 Jews were killed in a pogrom, and continued insecurity contributed to a decline in the Jewish population. Under Soviet rule, many Jews worked in government institutions and cooperatives, while some joined a Jewish collective farm. From the 1920s until the late 1930s, Chechelnyk had a state-recognized Jewish council and a Yiddish-language school. By the late 1930s, approximately 1,300 Jews lived in Chechelnyk, comprising about 65 percent of its population.

== The Holocaust ==
Chechelnyk was occupied by German forces on 24 July 1941. During the following weeks, Jews were subjected to robbery, abuse and killings before the area was transferred to the Romanian-administered Transnistria Governorate. Romanian authorities established a ghetto enclosed by barbed wire and required Jews to wear a yellow Star of David. About 1,000 Jews from Chechelnyk, together with survivors from the Jewish communities of Kodyma and Pishchanka, were initially confined there. More than 1,000 Jewish deportees from Bukovina and Bessarabia were subsequently brought to the ghetto.

The authorities ordered the establishment of an eleven-member Jewish council, headed by Yosef Zaslavsky, as well as a Jewish police service. Jewish men up to the age of 60 and women up to 55 were subjected to forced labour. A typhus epidemic during the winter of 1941–1942 killed approximately one-third of the ghetto's inhabitants. By March 1943, about 1,400 Jews remained in Chechelnyk.

Aid from Jewish organizations in Bucharest began reaching the ghetto in January 1943, after which soup kitchens were established for children and other needy residents. A Jewish underground group also operated in the ghetto and cooperated with Soviet partisans, while a number of young Jews escaped to join partisan units. Despite deaths from disease, hunger and forced labour, a comparatively large proportion of the Jews confined in the Chechelnyk ghetto survived the Romanian occupation.

== Notable residents ==
- Brazilian writer Clarice Lispector was born in Chechelnyk during a pause in the family's journey to escape Russia.
