= Chechelnyk Raion =

Former subdivision of Vinnytsia Oblast, Ukraine

Chechelnyk Raion Чечельницький район
- Raion
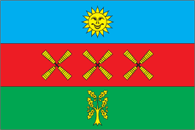
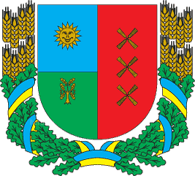
- Flag Coat of arms

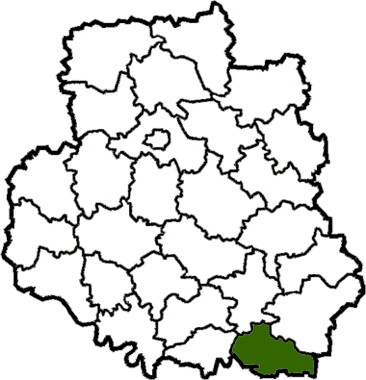
- Coordinates: 48°12′00″N 29°21′00″E
- Country: Ukraine
- Oblast: Vinnytsia Oblast
- Established: 20 December 1966
- Disestablished: 18 July 2020
- Admin. center: Chechelnyk
- Subdivisions: List: — city councils; 1 — settlement councils; 15 — rural councils; Number of localities: — cities; 1 — urban-type settlements; 21 — villages; — rural settlements

Government
  - Governor: Mykola Kachinskiy

Area
  - Total: 760 km^{2} (290 sq mi)

Population (2020)
  - Total: 20,120 ▼
  - Density: 26/km^{2} (69/sq mi)
- Time zone: UTC+02:00 (EET)
  - Summer (DST): UTC+03:00 (EEST)
- Postal index: 24800—24834
- Area code: +380 4351
- Website: http://rda.chechelnik.org.ua

Chechelnyk Raion (Ukrainian: Чечельницький район) was one of raions of Vinnytsia Oblast, located in southwestern Ukraine. The administrative center of the raion was the urban-type settlement of Chechelnyk. The raion was abolished and its territory was merged into Haisyn Raion on 18 July 2020 as part of the administrative reform of Ukraine, which reduced the number of raions of Vinnytsia Oblast to six. The last estimate of the raion population was 20,120 (2020 est.).
