= Pishchanka Raion =

Former subdivision of Vinnytsia Oblast, Ukraine

Pishchanka Raion Піщанський район
- Raion
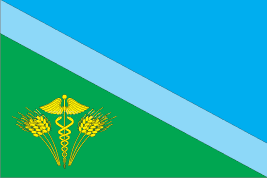
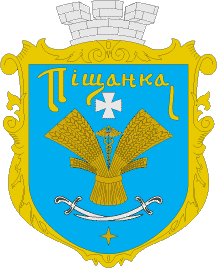
- Flag Coat of arms

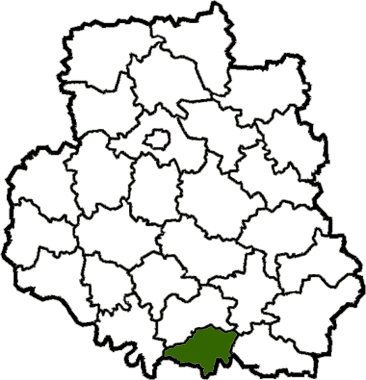
- Coordinates: 48°12′N 28°54′E
- Country: Ukraine
- Oblast: Vinnytsia Oblast
- Established: 1923
- Disestablished: 18 July 2020
- Admin. center: Pishchanka
- Subdivisions: List: 0 — city councils; 2 — settlement councils; 13 — rural councils; Number of localities: 0 — cities; 2 — urban-type settlements; 19 — villages; — rural settlements

Government
  - Governor: Svitlana Zherdetska

Area
  - Total: 600 km^{2} (230 sq mi)

Population (2020)
  - Total: 20,021 ▼
  - Density: 33/km^{2} (86/sq mi)
- Time zone: UTC+02:00 (EET)
  - Summer (DST): UTC+03:00 (EEST)
- Postal index: 24700—24736
- Area code: +380 4349
- Website: Pishchanskyi region

Pishchanka Raion (Ukrainian: Піщанський район) was one of raions of Vinnytsia Oblast, located in southwestern Ukraine. The administrative center of the raion was the urban-type settlement of Pishchanka. The raion was abolished and its territory was merged into Tulchyn Raion on 18 July 2020 as part of the administrative reform of Ukraine, which reduced the number of raions of Vinnytsia Oblast to six. The last estimate of the raion population was 20,021 (2020 est.).
