= Orativ =

Rural locality in Vinnytsia Oblast, Ukraine

Orativ Оратів Oratów
- Rural settlement
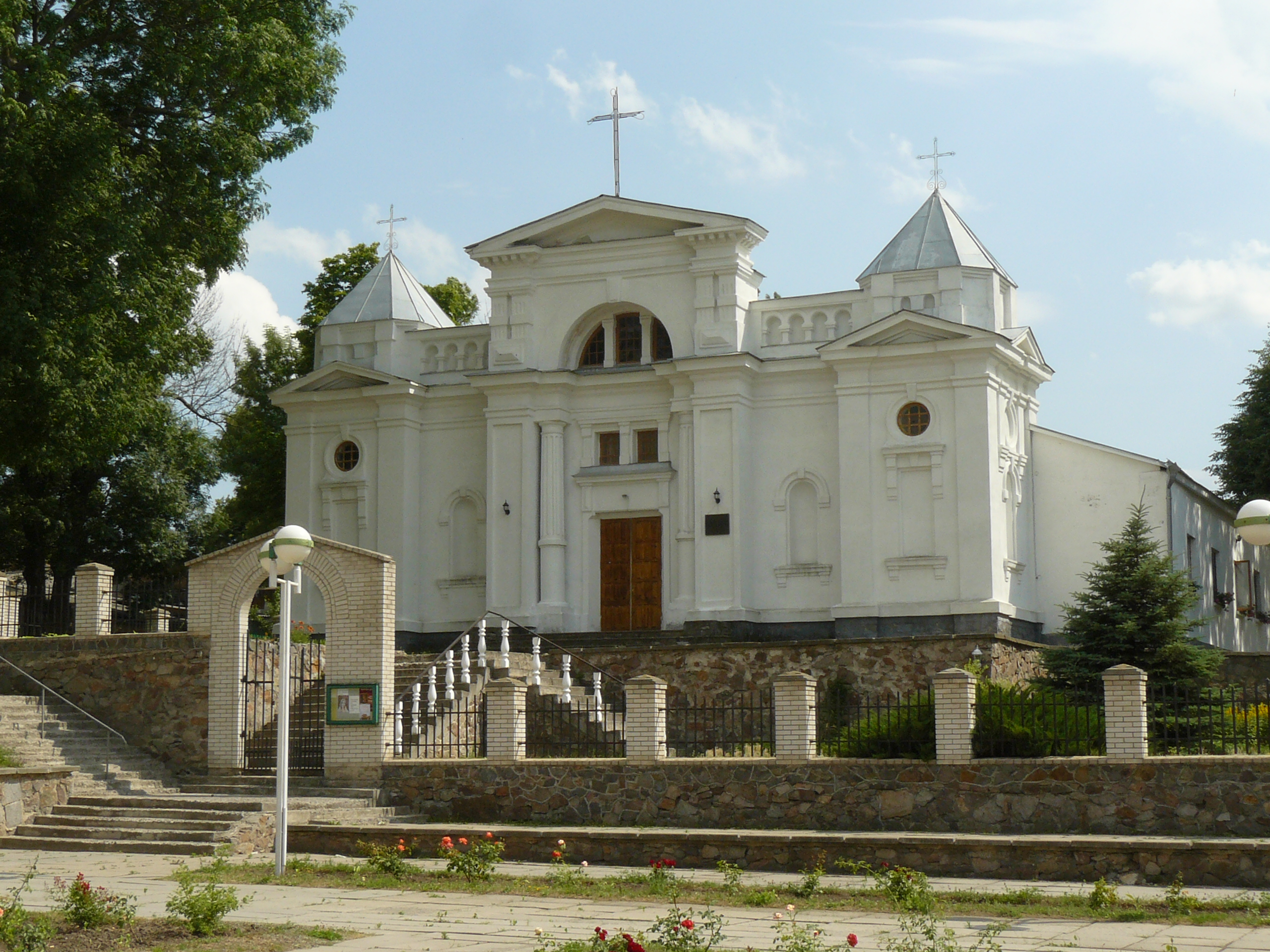
- St. Stanislaus' church

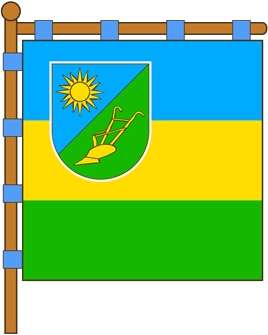
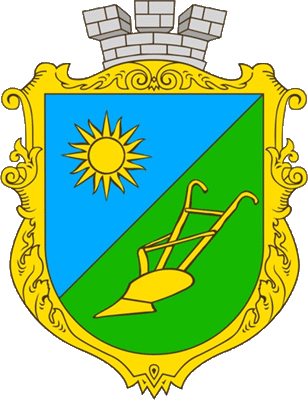
- Flag Coat of arms

- Location within Vinnytsia Oblast Location within Ukraine
- Coordinates: 49°12′N 29°31′E
- Country: Ukraine
- Oblast: Vinnytsia Oblast
- Raion: Vinnytsia Raion
- First mentioned: 1448
- Urban-type settlement status: 1984

Population (2022)
  - Total: 2,694
- Time zone: UTC+2 (EET)
  - Summer (DST): UTC+3 (EEST)
- Postal code: 22600 - 22604 and 22633
- Area code: +380 4330

Orativ (Ukrainian: Оратів, Polish: Oratów) is a rural settlement in Vinnytsia Oblast, located in the historic region of Podillia, Ukraine. It was the administrative seat of the former Orativ Raion. Until 1984 Orativ was a village. Population: 2,694 (2022 estimate). It had a large Jewish population before the Holocaust.

Orativ was the birthplace of the 3rd Prime Minister of Israel Levi Eshkol.

== History ==
Historical affiliations

Grand Duchy of Lithuania 1448–1569
Polish–Lithuanian Commonwealth 1569–1672
Ottoman Empire 1672–1699
Polish–Lithuanian Commonwealth 1699–1793
Russian Empire 1793–1917
Ukrainian People's Republic 1917–1920
Soviet Ukraine 1920–1922
Soviet Union 1922–1991
Ukraine 1991–present

Until the Partitions of Poland Oratów was part of the Bracław Voivodeship of the Lesser Poland Province of the Polish Crown.

Until 26 January 2024, Orativ was designated urban-type settlement. On this day, a new law entered into force which abolished this status, and Orativ became a rural settlement.
