= Strointsi, Vinnytsia Oblast =

Village in Vinnytsia Oblast, Ukraine

Strointsi Строїнці
- Village
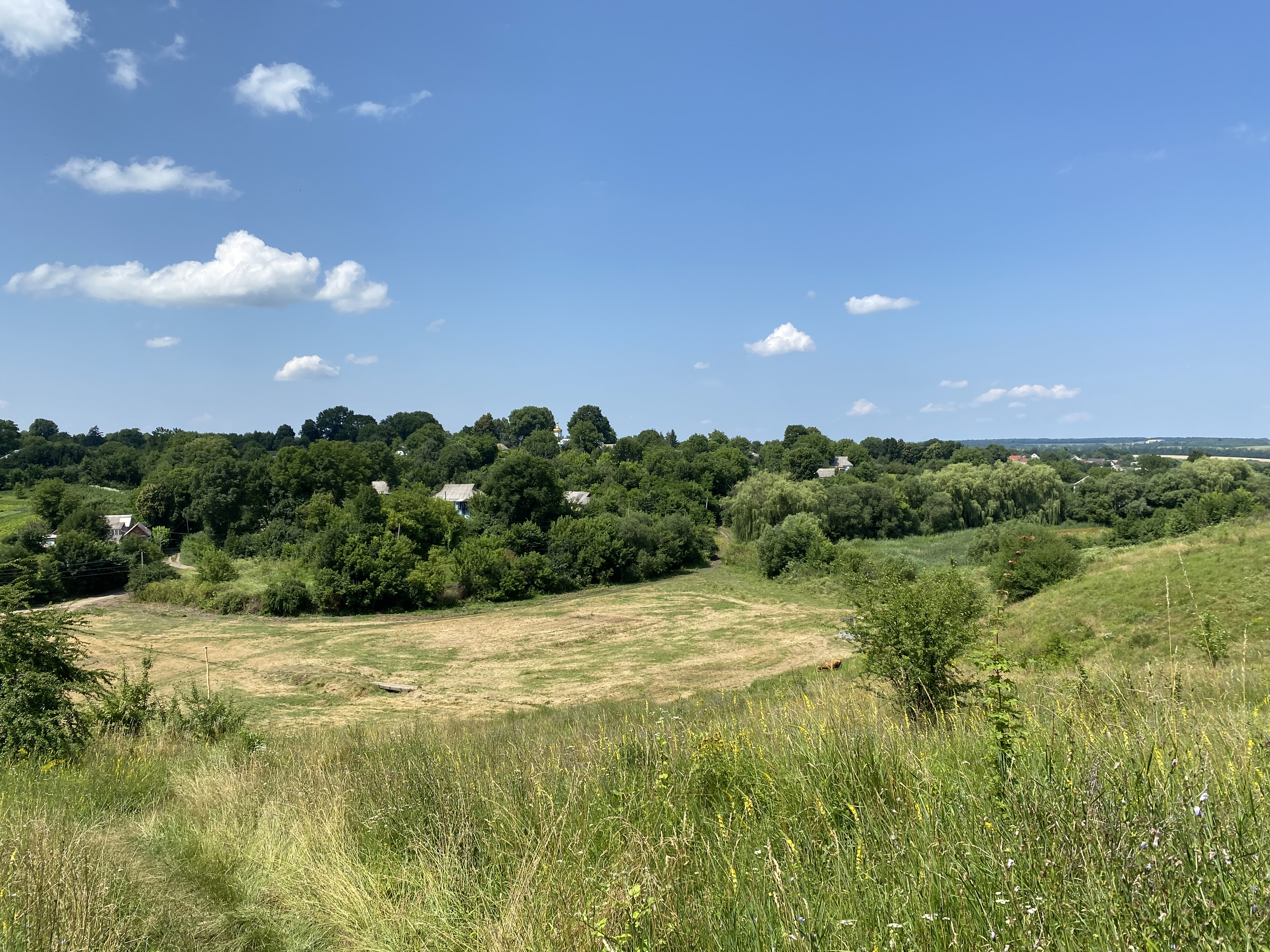

- Location in Vinnytsia Oblast Location in Ukraine
- Coordinates: 48°54′21″N 28°18′15″E
- Country: Ukraine
- Oblast: Vinnytsia Oblast
- Raion: Vinnytsia Raion
- Hromada: Tyvriv settlement hromada
- Elevation: 902 ft (275 m)

Population (2001)
  - Total: 1,631
- Time zone: UTC+2 (EET)
  - Summer (DST): UTC+3 (EEST)
- Postal code: 23340
- Area code: +380 4355

Strointsi (Ukrainian: Строїнці; Polish: Stroińce) is a village in Vinnytsia Raion, Vinnytsia Oblast, Ukraine, in the historic region of Podolia.

== History ==
According to official data, Strointsi was founded in 1300, but the inhabitants claim that the village is older and was founded in 1263, exactly 100 years before the foundation of Vinnytsia.

In 1744, the village, along with other Tyvriv suburbs, belonged to Zachariasz Jaroszyński. In 1763, a wooden Orthodox church was built in Strointsi, which In Soviet times the church was transformed into a warehouse and then a local cinema. In the 1980s, as part of perestroika, the church was reopened for the needs of the Orthodox community.

Following the Second Partition of Poland, it was annexed by Russia, within which it was part of the Penkovka volost, in the Yampol uezd of the Podolia Governorate. In the late 19th century, it had a population of 582. From 1941 to 1944, it was administered by Romania as part of the Transnistria Governorate.

Until 18 July 2020, Strointsi belonged to Tyvriv Raion. The raion was abolished in July 2020 as part of the administrative reform of Ukraine, which reduced the number of raions of Vinnytsia Oblast to six. The area of Tyvriv Raion was merged into Vinnytsia Raion.

== Demographics ==
Native language as of the Ukrainian Census of 2001:

Language	Percentage
Ukrainian	97.36 %
Russian	2.39 %
Others	0.06 %
