= Koziatyn Raion =

Former subdivision of Vinnytsia Oblast, Ukraine

Coordinates: 49°43′N 28°50′E

Koziatyn Raion Козятинський район
- Raion
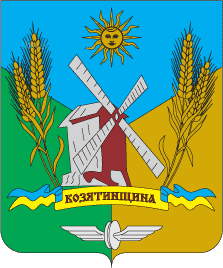
- Flag Coat of arms

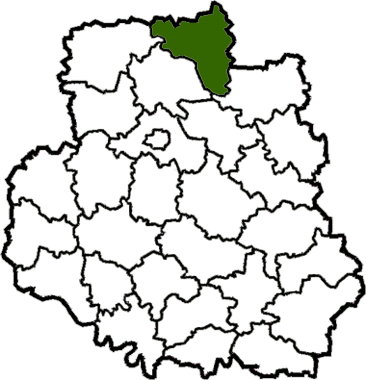
- Country: Ukraine
- Oblast: Vinnytsia Oblast
- Established: 1923
- Disestablished: 18 July 2020
- Admin. center: Koziatyn
- Subdivisions: List: 1 — city councils; 2 — settlement councils; 32 — rural councils; Number of localities: 1 — cities; 2 — urban-type settlements; 67 — villages; — rural settlements

Government
  - Governor: Oleksiy Lavrenyuk

Area
  - Total: 1,120 km^{2} (430 sq mi)

Population (2020)
  - Total: 37,618 ▼
  - Density: 33.6/km^{2} (87.0/sq mi)
- Time zone: UTC+02:00 (EET)
  - Summer (DST): UTC+03:00 (EEST)
- Postal index: 22100—22172
- Area code: +380 4342
- Website: http://kazatin-rda.gov.ua

Koziatyn Raion (Ukrainian: Козятинський район) was one of raions of Vinnytsia Oblast, located in southwestern Ukraine. The administrative center of the raion (district) was the city of Koziatyn which was not part of the district and was incorporated separately as a town of oblast significance. The raion was abolished and its territory was merged into Khmilnyk Raion on 18 July 2020 as part of the administrative reform of Ukraine, which reduced the number of raions of Vinnytsia Oblast to six. The last estimate of the raion population was 37,618 (2020 est.).
