= Tyvriv =

Rural locality in Vinnytsia Oblast, Ukraine

- Rural settlement
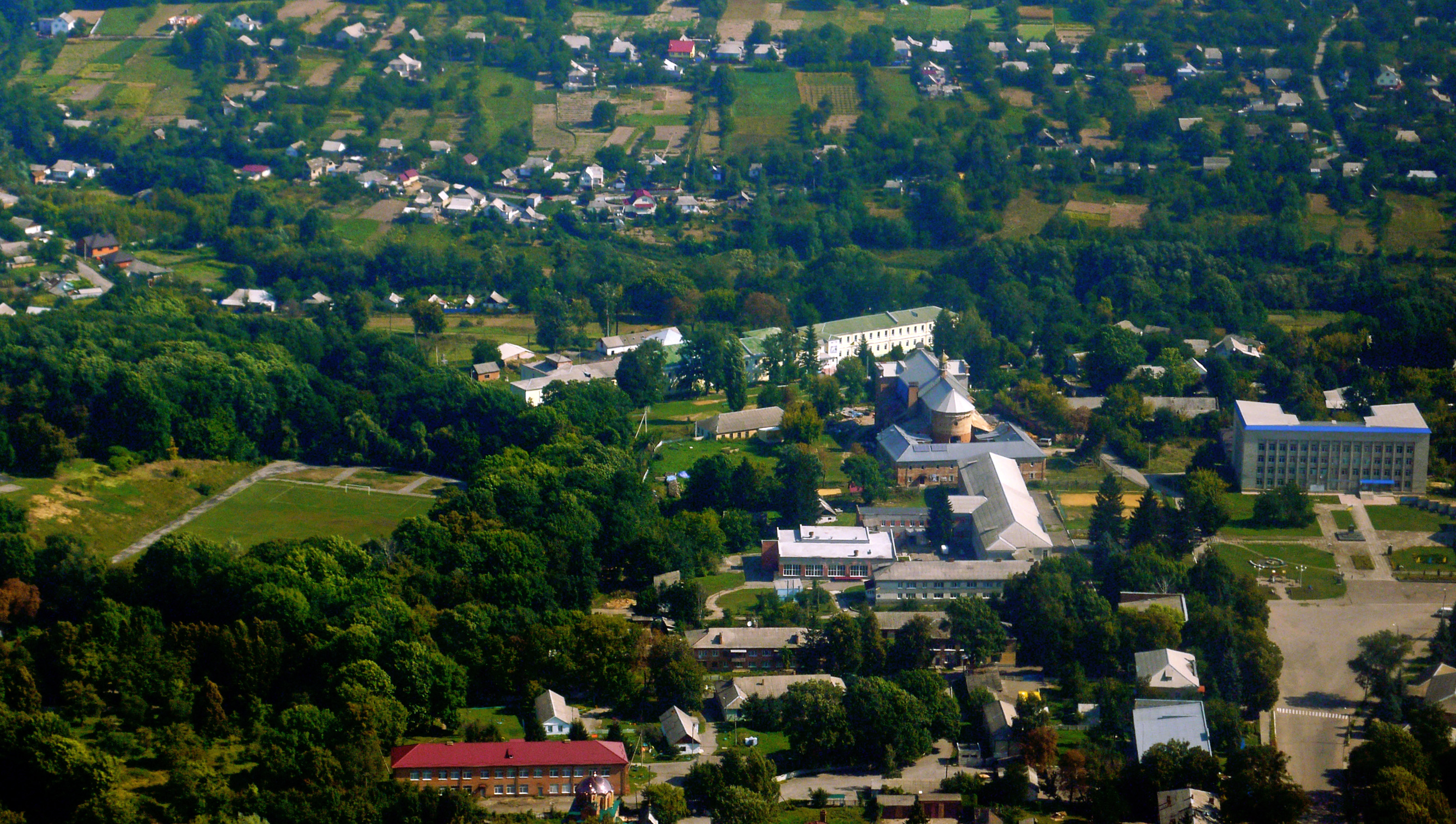

- Location within Vinnytsia Oblast Location within Ukraine
- Coordinates: 49°00′43″N 28°30′14″E
- Country: Ukraine
- Oblast: Vinnytsia Oblast
- Raion: Vinnytsia Raion
- Hromada: Tyvriv settlement hromada
- First mentioned: 1505

Population (2022)
  - Total: 3,879
- Time zone: UTC+2 (EET)
  - Summer (DST): UTC+3 (EEST)

Tyvriv (Ukrainian: Тиврів; Polish: Tywrów) is a rural settlement in Vinnytsia Oblast, Ukraine. Geographically it is in eastern Podolia on the shore of Southern Bug, southeast of Vinnytsia. It was formerly the administrative center of the Tyvriv Raion, and is now administered within Vinnytsia Raion. Population: 3,879 (2022 estimate)

== History ==
Historical affiliations

Grand Duchy of Lithuania 1505–1569
Polish–Lithuanian Commonwealth 1569–1672
Ottoman Empire 1672–1699
Polish–Lithuanian Commonwealth 1699–1793
Russian Empire 1793–1917
Ukrainian People's Republic 1917–1920
Soviet Ukraine 1920–1922
Soviet Union 1922–1941
Kingdom of Romania 1941–1944
Soviet Union 1944–1991
Ukraine 1991–present

Tyvriv (then Tywrów) was granted Magdeburg rights in 1744. Until the Partitions of Poland it was part of the Bracław Voivodeship of the Lesser Poland Province of the Polish Crown. It was a small town, owned by Polish nobility. In the 18th century the two landmarks of the town were built: Michał Jan Klityński founded the Baroque St. Michael's church, and Zachariasz Jaroszyński built a palace complex.

In 1900, there were around 1,000 Jews living there. The city was under German, then Romanian occupation from 1941 to 1944. In 1941 in Tyvriv was created one of the greatest ghetto's in region.

The majority of the Jews were killed during two different actions in a forest close to the city, in 1941, when it was still under German occupation. There were several hundred victims.

Until 26 January 2024, Tyvriv was designated urban-type settlement. On this day, a new law entered into force which abolished this status, and Tyvriv became a rural settlement.

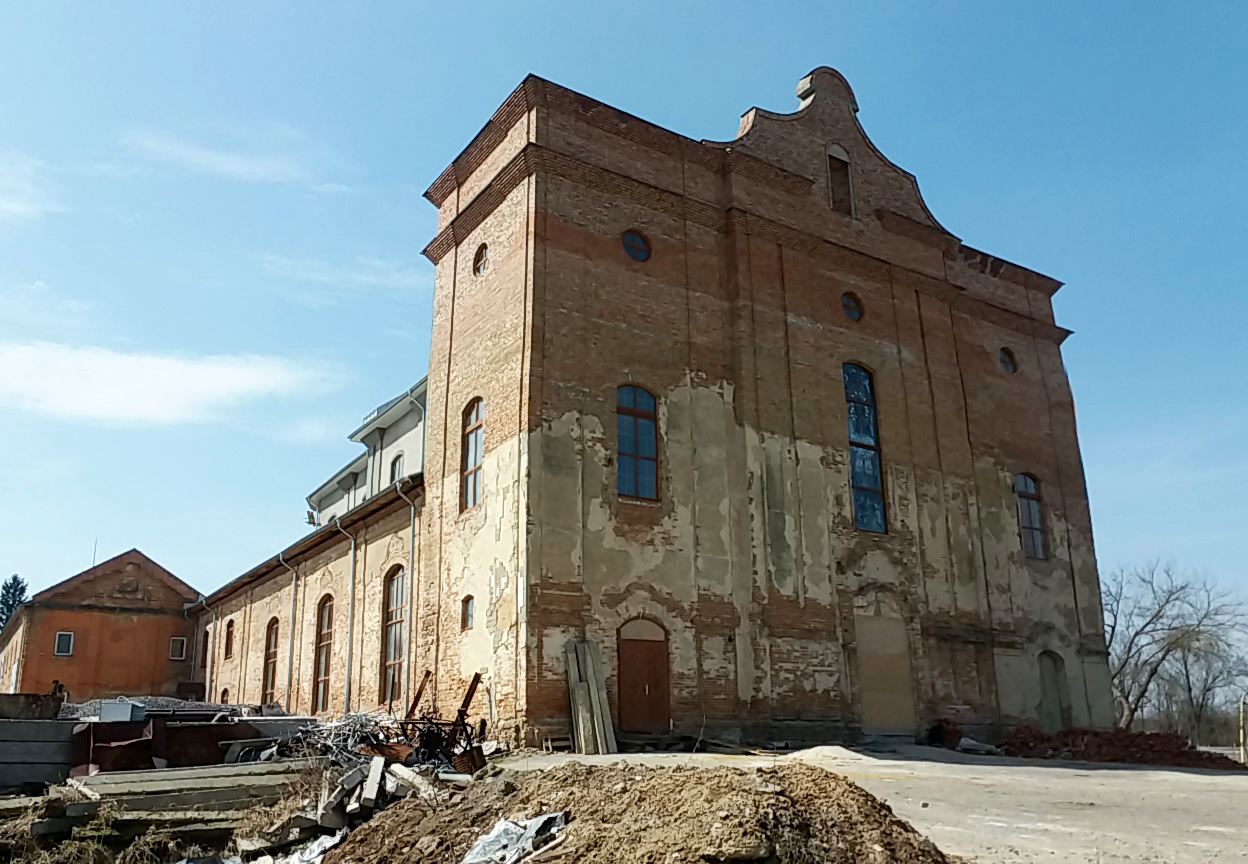
Polish-era St. Michael's church

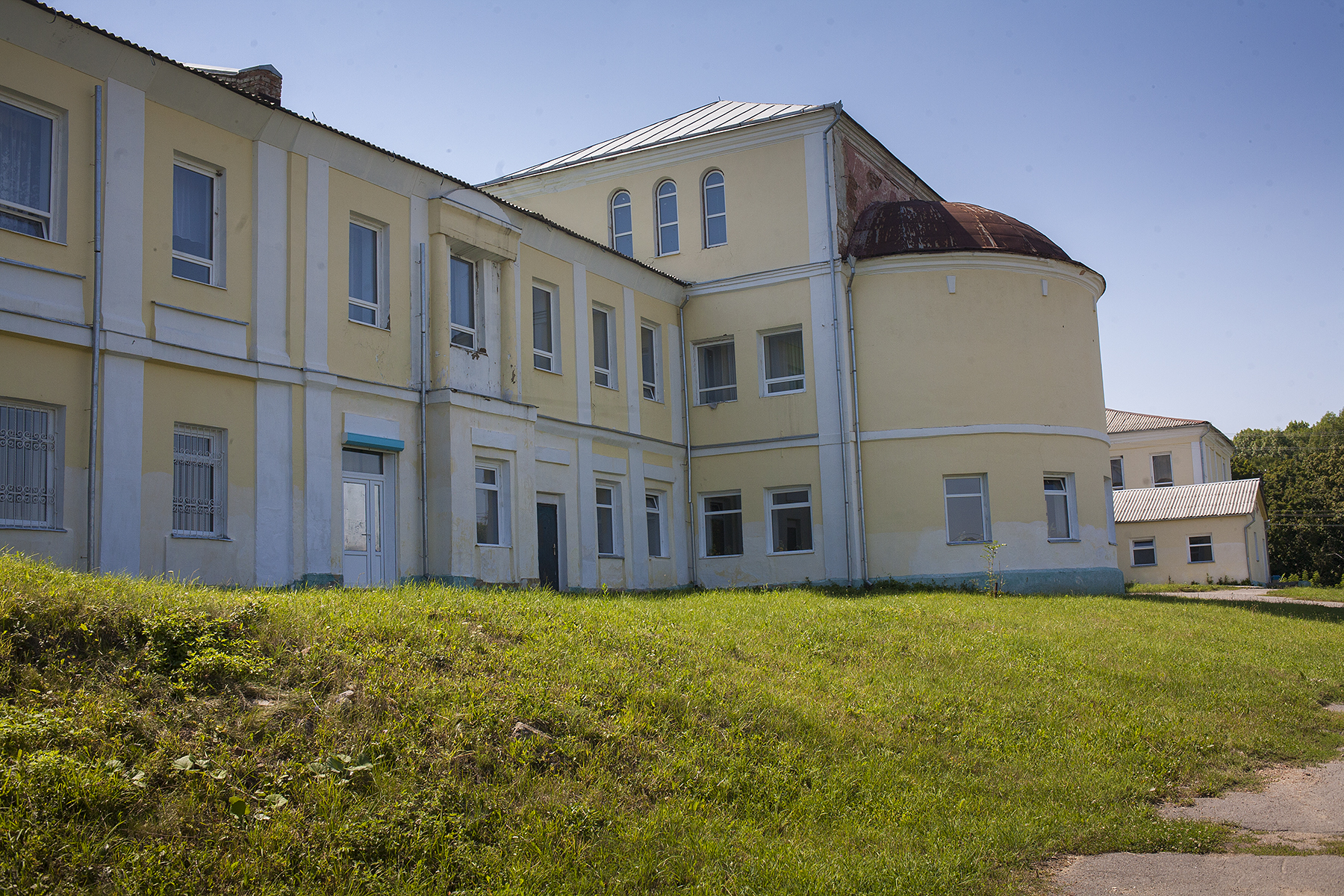
Jaroszyński Palace
