= Koziatyn =

City in Vinnytsia Oblast, Ukraine

Koziatyn Козятин
- City
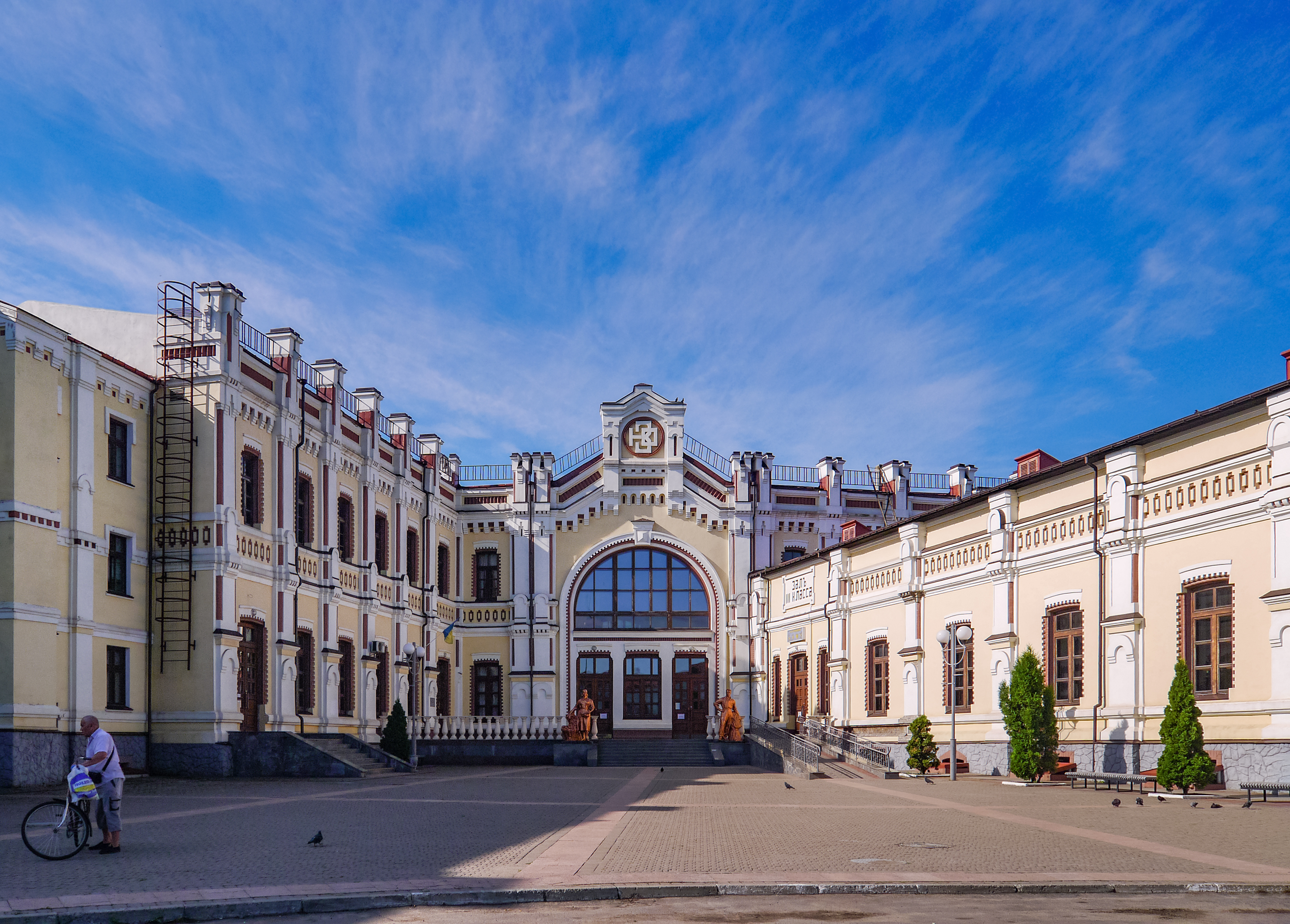
- Rail terminal in Koziatyn

- Flag Coat of arms

- Location within Vinnytsia Oblast Location within Ukraine
- Coordinates: 49°43′0″N 28°50′0″E
- Country: Ukraine
- Oblast: Vinnytsia Oblast
- Raion: Khmilnyk Raion
- Hromada: Koziatyn urban hromada
- Founded: 1870

Area
  - Total: 20.1 km^{2} (7.8 sq mi)
- Highest elevation: 307 m (1,007 ft)

Population (2022)
  - Total: 22,241
  - Density: 1,110/km^{2} (2,870/sq mi)
- Postal code: 22100-22108
- Area code: +380-4342
- Website: http://komr.gov.ua/

Koziatyn (also referred to as Kozyatyn; Ukrainian: Козятин, IPA: [koˈzʲɑtɪn]; Polish: Koziatyn; Russian: Казатин) is a city in the Vinnytsia Oblast (province) in central Ukraine. The population is 22,241 (2022 estimate).

== Geography ==
Koziatyn is located 75 kilometres (47 mi) from the oblast capital, Vinnytsia (approximately 150 km (93 mi) from Kyiv, the capital of Ukraine). It lies on the banks of the Huiva River in the western part of Dnieper Upland.

== History ==
Historical affiliations

Polish–Lithuanian Commonwealth 1734–1793
Russian Empire 1793–1917
Ukrainian People's Republic and Ukrainian State 1917-1920
Soviet Ukraine 1920–1922
Soviet Union 1922–1991
Ukraine 1991–present

The village of Koziatyn was first mentioned in 1734. The city was founded during the construction of Kyiv-Balta railway. Koziatyn became a town of the Berdychiv district of Kyiv Governorate on July 7, 1874.

In late 1918 Koziatyn was a site of battles between insurgents and German troops during the Anti-Hetman Uprising. In February 1919 the city witnessed fights between Sich Riflemen and Bolshevik forces, and in August of the same year it was captured by the Ukrainian Galician Army during its offensive on Kyiv.

In April 1920, during the Polish-Bolshevik War, the town was captured by Polish forces in what became known as the Raid on Koziatyn. In 1923, Koziatyn became the district center of Berdychiv okruha. A few years later, the district was included in the Vinnytsia Oblast.

During World War II, Koziatyn was under German occupation from 15 July 1941 until 28 December 1943. It was administered as part of Reichskommissariat Ukraine from 1 September 1941 until 28 December 1943. The Jewish population was systematically destroyed through a series of mass killing operations. On June 4, 1942, Germans killed 508 Jews and another 250 in early July. In August they murdered 183, and the last 30 in December 1942.

Under the Soviet rule Koziatyn served as the centre of an eponymous district.

In 1992, the UOC-KP community was formed in the city. In July 2000, the Verkhovna Rada of Ukraine decided to include Koziatyn in the category of cities of regional subordination. In 2020 the city was incorporated into Khmilnyk Raion.

== Demographics ==
Historical population
Year	Pop.	±%
1897	9,000	—
1956	19,700	+118.9%
2001	27,155	+37.8%
2022	22,241	−18.1%

As of the Ukrainian national census in 2001, the city had a population of 27,155. The ethnic composition was as follows:

Ethnic groups in Koziatyn
	percent
Ukrainians	93.39%
Russians	4.34%
Poles	0.97%
Belarusians	0.28%
Jews	0.22%
Armenians	0.11%
Azerbaijanis	0.07%
Moldovans	0.07%
Tatars	0.06%

== Economy ==
Koziatyn is an important railway junction. There is also a big poultry farm in the city. The railroad industry accounts for 90% of Koziatyn's budget income.

== Twin towns – sister cities ==
Koziatyn is twinned with:

- Leżajsk, Poland
- Bolzano, Italy

== Gallery ==
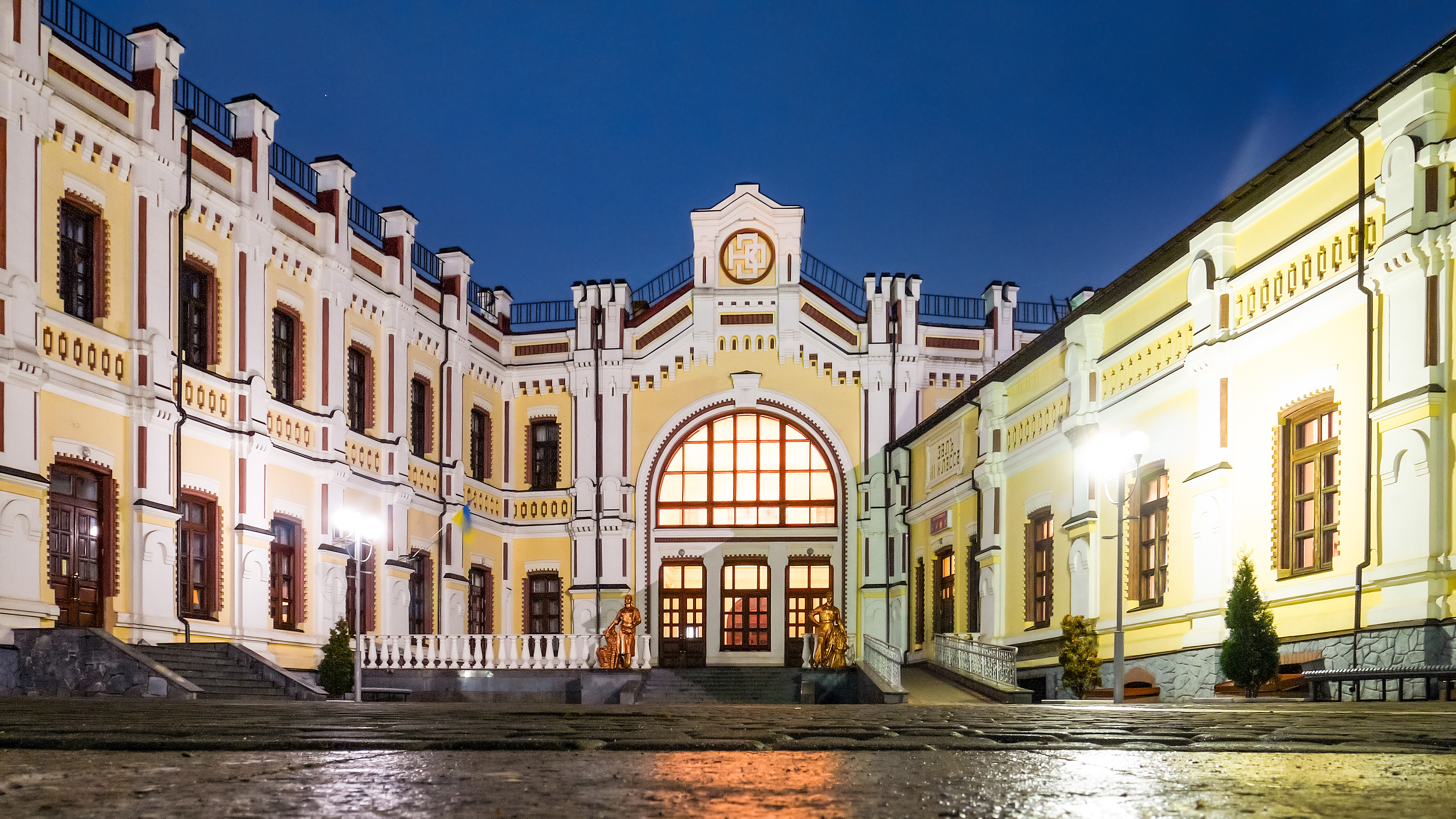
Koziatyn railway station, main entrance

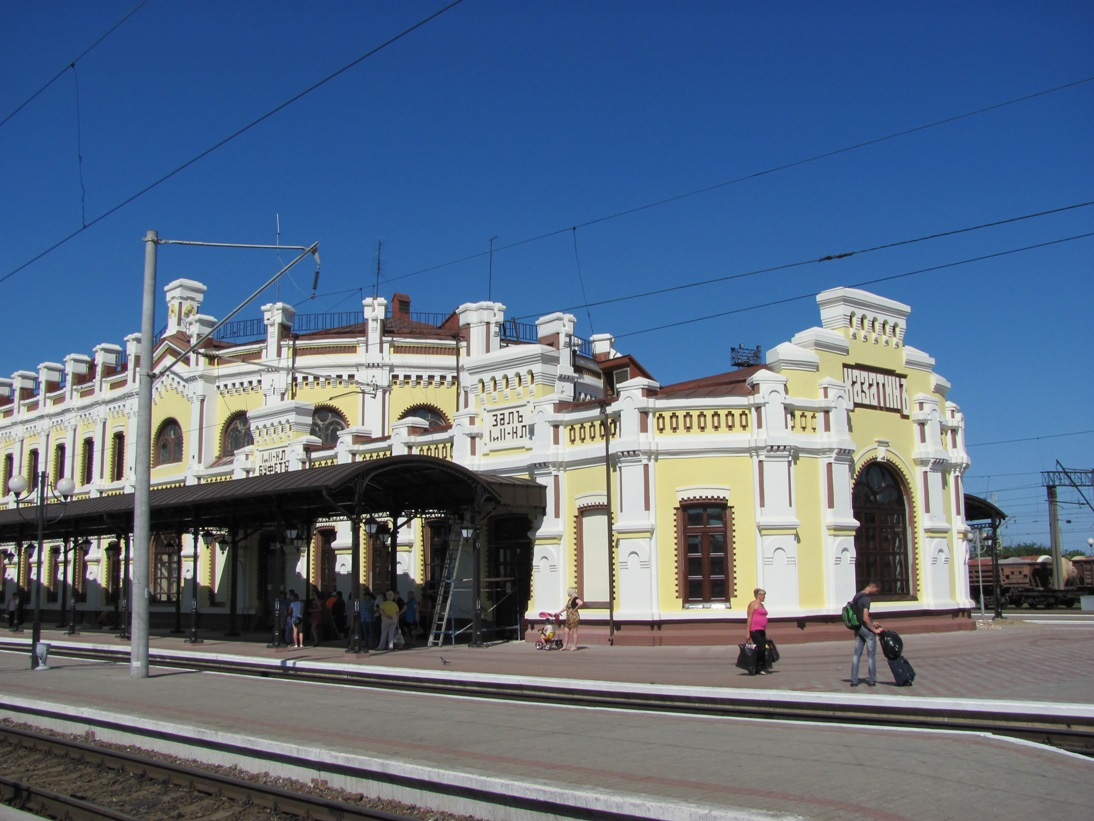
View from platform

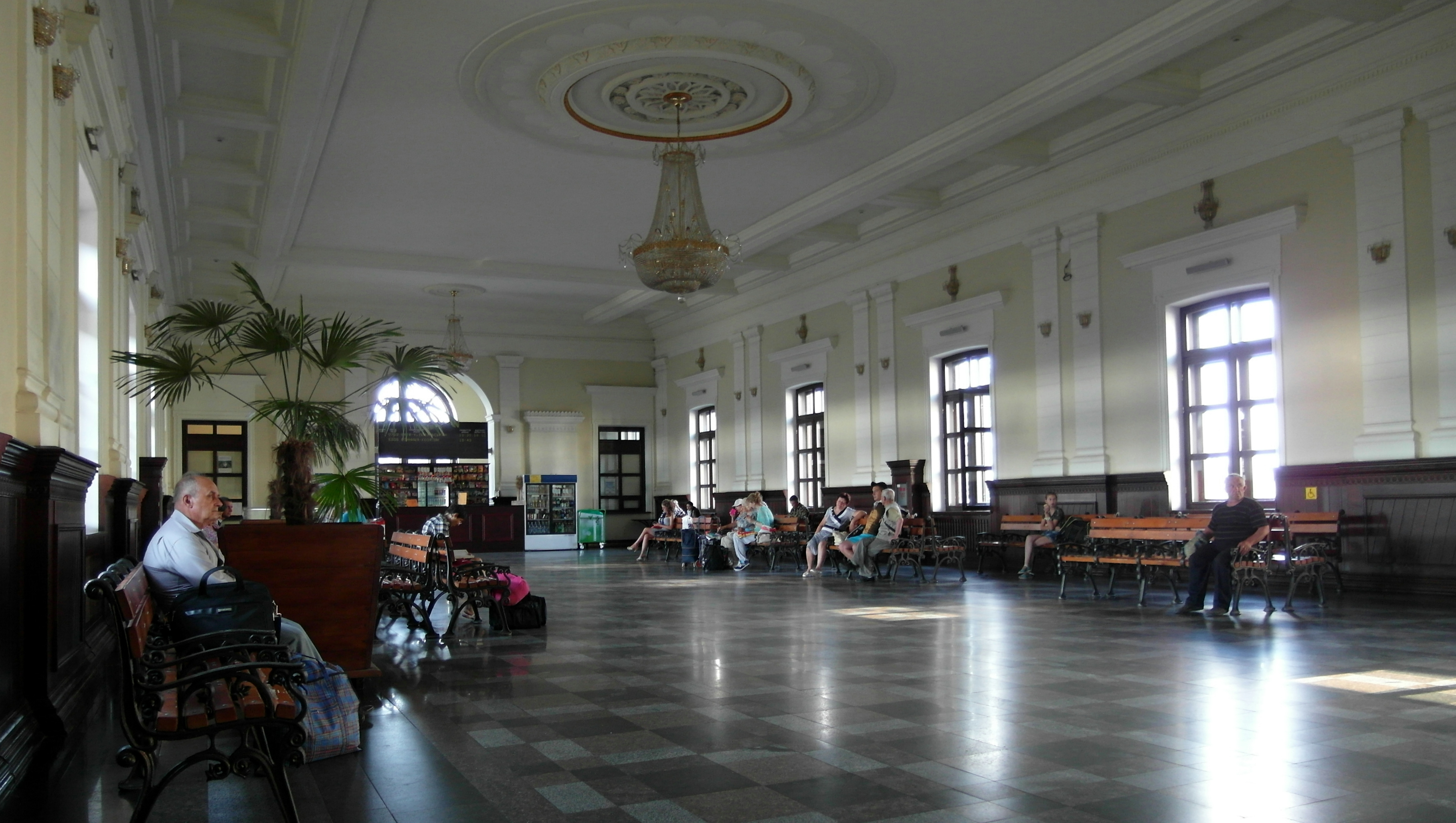
Koziatyn Railway station (after rebuilding in 2011-2012)

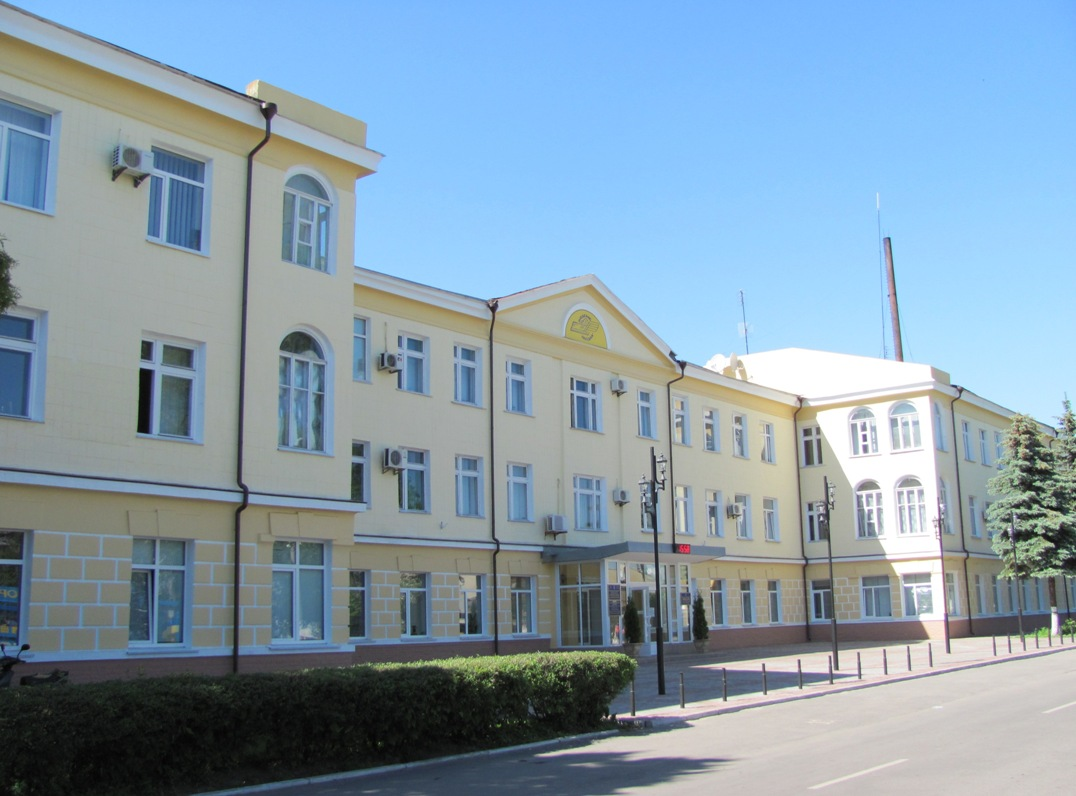
Railway office in Koziatyn

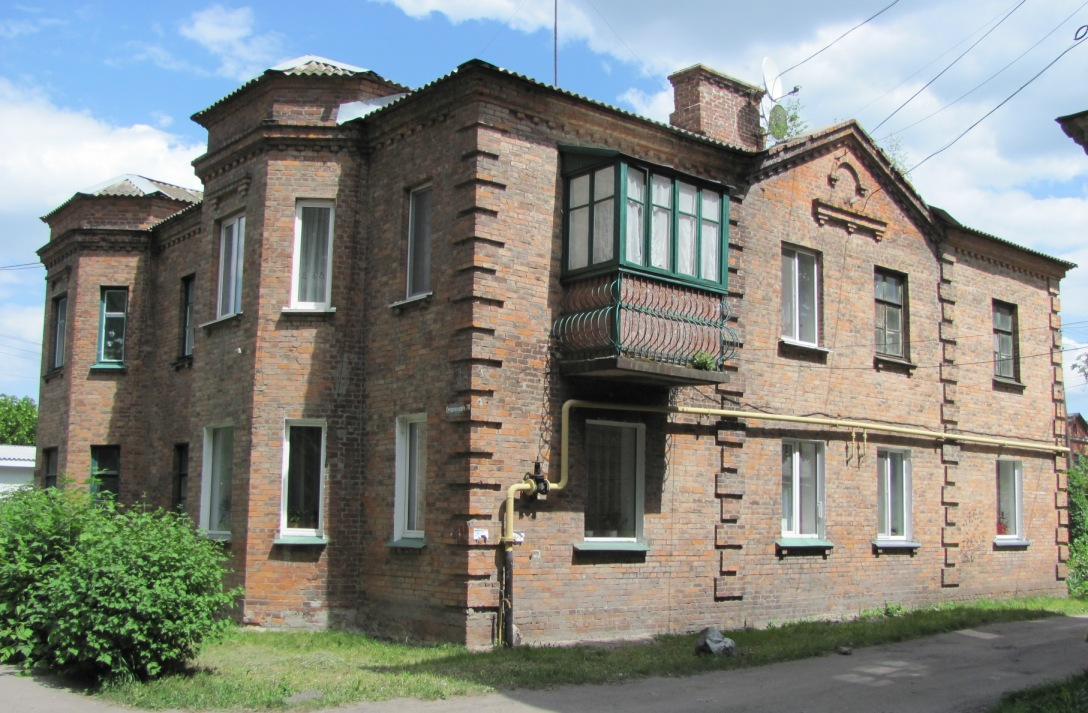
House in downtown

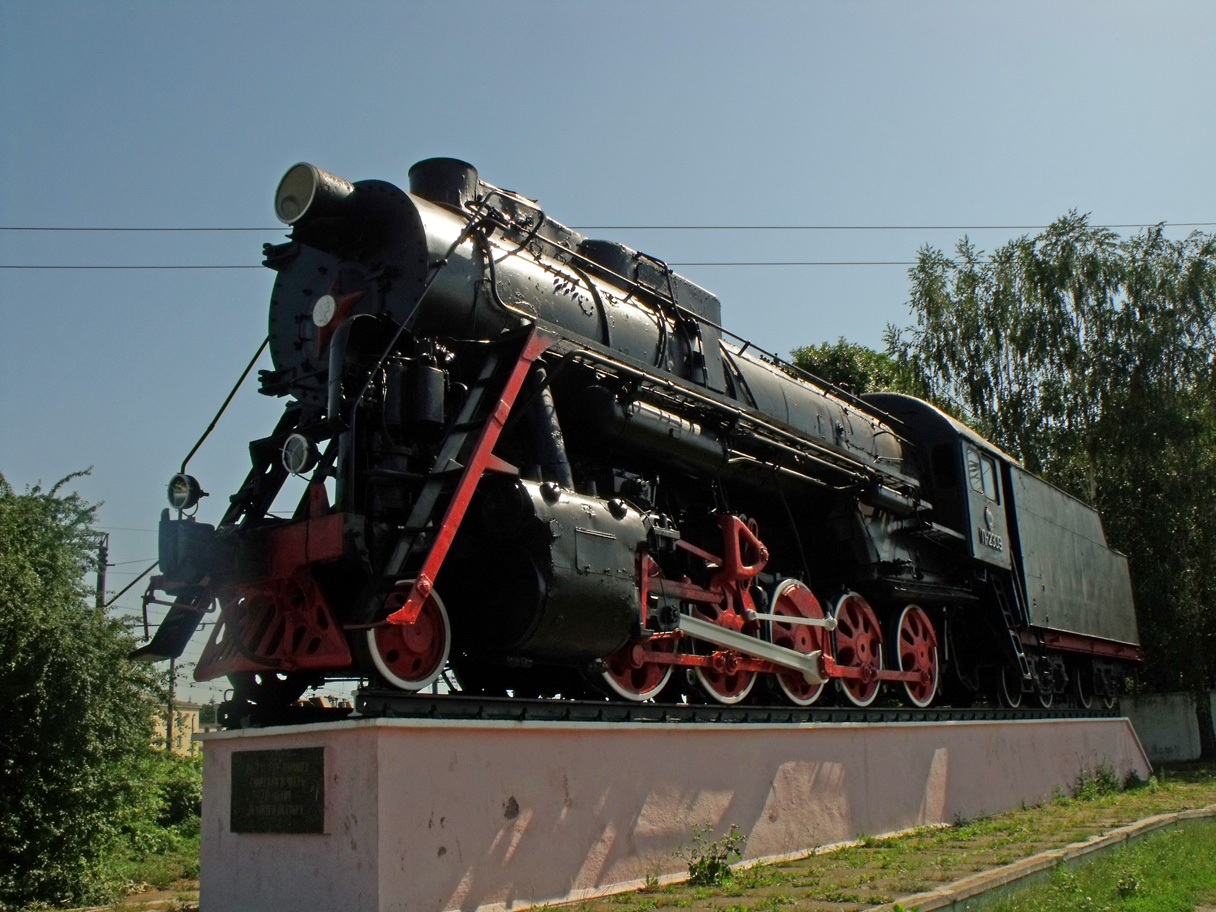
Locomotive L-2309
