= Nemyriv Raion =

Former subdivision of Vinnytsia Oblast, Ukraine

Nemyriv Raion Немирівський район
- Raion
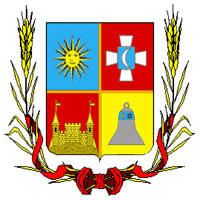
- Flag Coat of arms

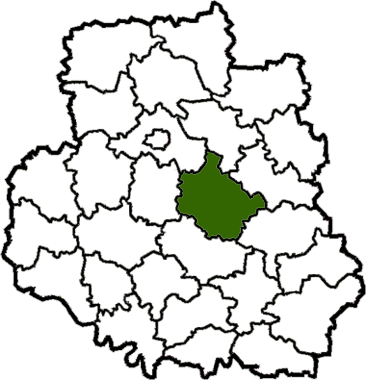
- Coordinates: 49°00′N 28°52′E
- Country: Ukraine
- Oblast: Vinnytsia Oblast
- Established: 1923
- Disestablished: 18 July 2020
- Admin. center: Nemyriv
- Subdivisions: List: 1 — city councils; 2 — settlement councils; 40 — rural councils; Number of localities: 1 — cities; 2 — urban-type settlements; 89 — villages; — rural settlements

Government
  - Governor: Anatoliy Dolvanyuk

Area
  - Total: 1,290 km^{2} (500 sq mi)

Population (2020)
  - Total: 46,906 ▼
  - Density: 36.4/km^{2} (94.2/sq mi)
- Time zone: UTC+02:00 (EET)
  - Summer (DST): UTC+03:00 (EEST)
- Postal index: 22800—22892
- Area code: +380 4331
- Website: http://nemyriv-rda.gov.ua

Nemyriv Raion (Ukrainian: Немирівський район, romanized: Nemyrivs'kyj rajon) was a raion (district) in Vinnytsia Oblast, Ukraine. The administrative center of Nemyriv Raion was the town of Nemyriv. The area of the raion was 1293 square km. There were 94 settlements in the raion. The raion was abolished and its territory was merged into Vinnytsia Raion on 18 July 2020 as part of the administrative reform of Ukraine, which reduced the number of raions of Vinnytsia Oblast to six. The last estimate of the raion population was 46,906 (2020 est.).
