= Khmilnyk Raion =

Subdivision of Vinnytsia Oblast, Ukraine

Khmilnyk Raion Хмільницький район
- Raion
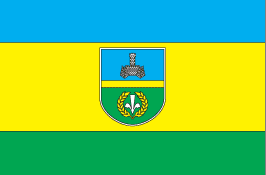
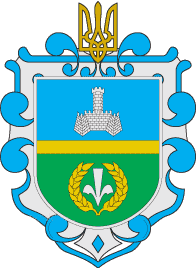
- Flag Coat of arms

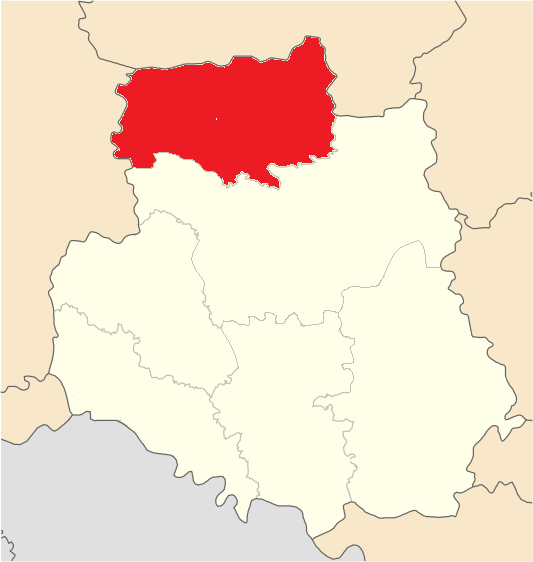
- Interactive map of Khmilnyk Raion
- Coordinates: 49°33′00″N 27°54′00″E
- Country: Ukraine
- Oblast: Vinnytsia Oblast
- Established: 1918
- Admin. center: Khmilnyk
- Subdivisions: 9 hromadas

Government
  - Governor: Oleg Tomashuk

Area
  - Total: 3,701.1 km^{2} (1,429.0 sq mi)

Population (2022)
  - Total: 180,732
  - Density: 48.832/km^{2} (126.47/sq mi)
- Time zone: UTC+02:00 (EET)
  - Summer (DST): UTC+03:00 (EEST)
- Postal index: 23000—23063
- Area code: +380 4341
- Website: http://rda.hm.ua/page/main

Khmilnyk Raion (Ukrainian: Хмільницький район) is one of the six raions (districts) of Vinnytsia Oblast, located in southwestern Ukraine. The administrative center of the raion is the city of Khmilnyk. Population: 180,732 (2022 estimate).

On 18 July 2020, as part of the administrative reform of Ukraine, the number of raions of Vinnytsia Oblast was reduced to six, and the area of Khmilnyk Raion was significantly expanded. The January 2020 estimate of the raion's population prior to merging was 34,576 (2020 est.).

== Geographic characteristics ==
Khmilnyk Raion is located in the north of Vinnytsia region. It borders Zhytomyr and Khmelnytskyi regions of Ukraine. The area of the district is 3701.9 km^{2}. Khmilnyk Raion is located on the Podilska and Dnieper uplands. The highest point of the Dnieper Upland (384 м) is located in Khmelnytskyi district. The relief of the district is an undulating plain, cut by river valleys, ravines, and gullies.

The climate is moderately continental. Winter is cool, summer is not hot. The average temperature in July is +20 °C, in January −5 °C. The maximum precipitation falls in the summer in the form of rain. The average annual amount is from 520 to 590 mm, changing from west to east.

Khmilnyk district is located in the basins of the Southern Bug and Dnieper rivers. The watershed between them runs through its territory. The river in the floodplain has many oxbow lakes and artificial lakes.The largest artificial lake is located on the Snyvod Snyvoda, a left tributary of the Southern Bug.

Khmilnyk Raion is located in the forest-steppe natural zone. Among the trees in the forests, oaks and hornbeam dominate. Typical large mammals are elk, roe deer, wild boar, squirrels, beavers, hares and wolves. The forests of Khmilnyk Raion are rich in mushrooms and berries. The soils are mostly lalfisol and typical chernozem. 60% of the district's territory is devoted to tillage.

Khmilnyk district has reserves of garnet, kaolinite, brown coal, mineral waters (radon).

== Communities of the district ==
Number of settlements 229. Number of cities – 3. Khmilnyk Raion includes 9 territorial communities. It includes: Kalynivka, Kozyatyn, Khmilnyk urban territorial communities, Hlukhivtsi, Zhdaniv, Ivaniv, Makhnivka, Samhorodok, Ulaniv rural territorial communities.

== Transport ==
Khmilnyk district is crossed by railway tracks and highways by the Vinnytsia-Zhytomyr connection. Passes through Haisyn European route E583.

== Bibliography ==
- Національний атлас України/НАН України, Інститут географії, Державна служба геодезії, картографії та кадастру; голов. ред. Л. Г. Руденко; голова ред. кол.Б.Є. Патон. — К.: ДНВП «Картографія», 2007. — 435 с. — 5 тис.прим. — ISBN 978-966-475-067-4.
- Географічна енциклопедія України : [у 3 т.] / редкол.: О. М. Маринич (відповід. ред.) та ін. — К., 1989—1993. — 33 000 екз. — ISBN 5-88500-015-8.
