= Tulchyn Raion =

Subdivision of Vinnytsia Oblast, Ukraine

Tulchyn Raion Тульчинський район
- Raion
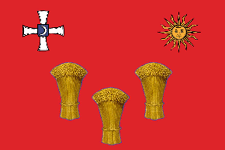
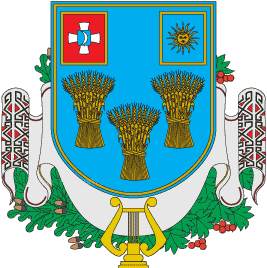
- Flag Coat of arms

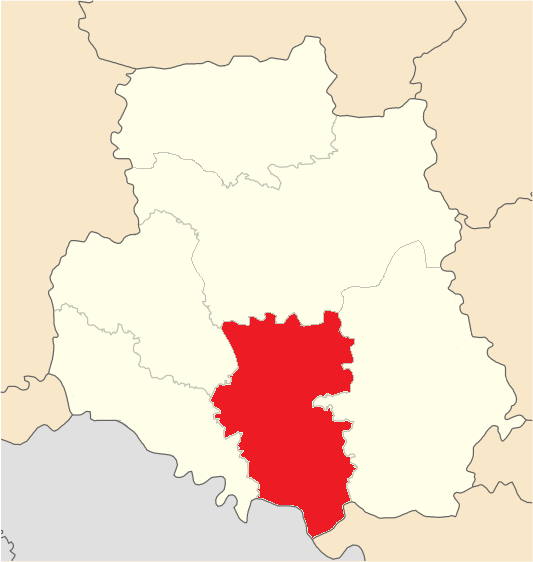
- Coordinates: 48°40′00″N 28°48′00″E
- Country: Ukraine
- Oblast: Vinnytsia Oblast
- Established: 1923
- Admin. center: Tulchyn
- Subdivisions: 9 hromadas

Government
  - Governor: Anatoliy Buzyk

Area
  - Total: 3,858.4 km^{2} (1,489.7 sq mi)

Population (2022)
  - Total: 149,429
  - Density: 38.728/km^{2} (100.31/sq mi)
- Time zone: UTC+02:00 (EET)
  - Summer (DST): UTC+03:00 (EEST)
- Postal index: 23600—23665
- Area code: +380 4335
- Website: http://tulchin-rada.org.ua/

Tulchyn Raion (Ukrainian: Тульчинський район) is one of the six raions (districts) of Vinnytsia Oblast, located in southwestern Ukraine. The administrative center of the raion is the town of Tulchyn. Population: 149,429 (2022 estimate).

On 18 July 2020, as part of the administrative reform of Ukraine, the number of raions of Vinnytsia Oblast was reduced to six, and the area of Tulchyn Raion was significantly expanded. The January 2020 estimate of the raion population was 53,426 (2020 est.).

== Geography ==
Tulchyn Raion is located in the south of Vinnytsia region. It borders with Moldova. The area of the district is 3859.2 km^{2}.

Tulchyn Raion district is located on the Podilska upland. The highest point in the district is 323 m.The relief of the district is an undulating plain, cut by river valleys, ravines, and gullies.

The climate is moderately continental. Winter is cool, summer is not hot. The average temperature in July is +20 °C, in January −5 °C. The maximum precipitation falls in the summer in the form of rain. The average annual amount is from 520 to 590 mm, changing from west to east.

The watershed between the Dniester and Southern Bug river basins runs through the Tulchyn Raion..

Tulchyn Raion is located in the forest-steppe natural zone. Among the trees in the forests, oaks and hornbeam dominate. Typical large mammals are elk, roe deer, wild boar, squirrels, beavers, hares and wolves.

Tulchyn Raion has reserves of limestone and granite.

== Communities of the district ==
Number of settlements 189. Number of cities – 1. Tulchyn Raion includes 9 territorial communities. It includes: urban - Tulchynska, rural - Gorodkivska, Studenyanska, settlement - Kryzhopilska, Bratslavska, Pishchanska, Vapnyarska, Tomashpilska, Shpykivska territorial communities..

== Transport ==
Tulchyn Raion is crossed by railway tracks and highways by the Vinnytsia connection.

== Bibliography ==
- Національний атлас України/НАН України, Інститут географії, Державна служба геодезії, картографії та кадастру; голов. ред. Л. Г. Руденко; голова ред. кол.Б.Є. Патон. — К.: ДНВП «Картографія», 2007. — 435 с. — 5 тис.прим. — ISBN 978-966-475-067-4.
- Географічна енциклопедія України : [у 3 т.] / редкол.: О. М. Маринич (відповід. ред.) та ін. — К., 1989—1993. — 33 000 екз. — ISBN 5-88500-015-8.

== Localities ==
- Marusyne
- Zhabokrych
