= List of cities in Vinnytsia Oblast =

Location of cities in Vinnytsia Oblast

There are 18 populated places in Vinnytsia Oblast, Ukraine, that have been officially granted city status (Ukrainian: місто, romanized: misto) by the Verkhovna Rada, the country's parliament. Settlements with more than 10,000 people are eligible for city status, although the status is typically also granted to settlements of historical or regional importance. As of 5 December 2001, the date of the first and only official census in the country since independence, (Note: As of 11 July 2023) the most populous city in the oblast was the regional capital, Vinnytsia, with a population of 356,665 people, while the least populous city was Sharhorod, with 7,161 people.

From independence in 1991 to 2020, six cities in the oblast were designated as cities of regional significance (municipalities), which had self-government under city councils, while the oblast's remaining 12 cities were located amongst 27 raions (districts) as cities of district significance, which are subordinated to the governments of the raions. On 18 July 2020, an administrative reform abolished and merged the oblast's raions and cities of regional significance into six new, expanded raions. The six raions that make up the oblast are Haisyn, Khmilnyk, Mohyliv-Podilskyi, Tulchyn, Vinnytsia, and Zhmerynka.

== List of cities ==
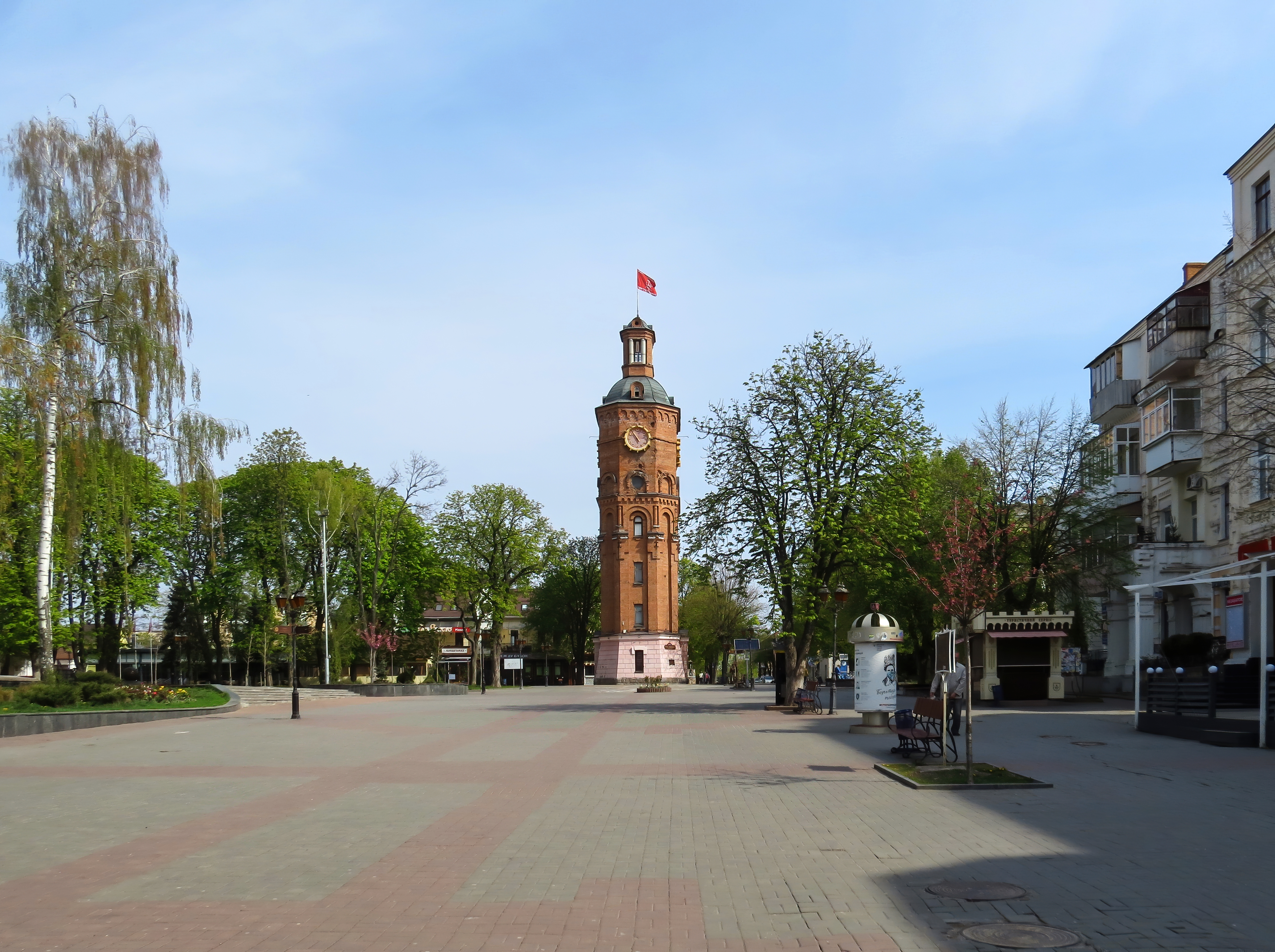
Vinnytsia, capital and most populous city in Vinnytsia Oblast

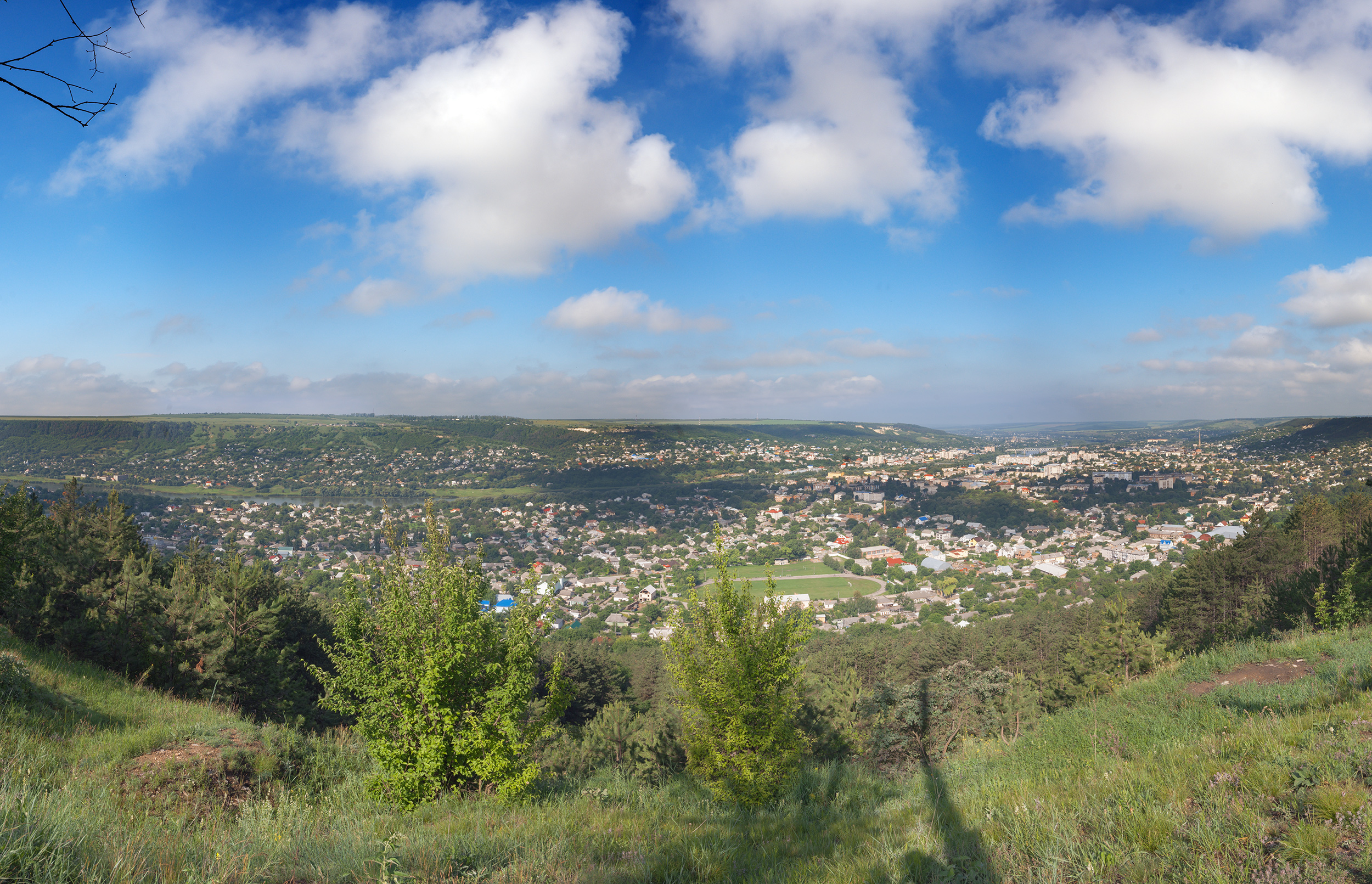
Mohyliv-Podilskyi, third most populous city in the oblast

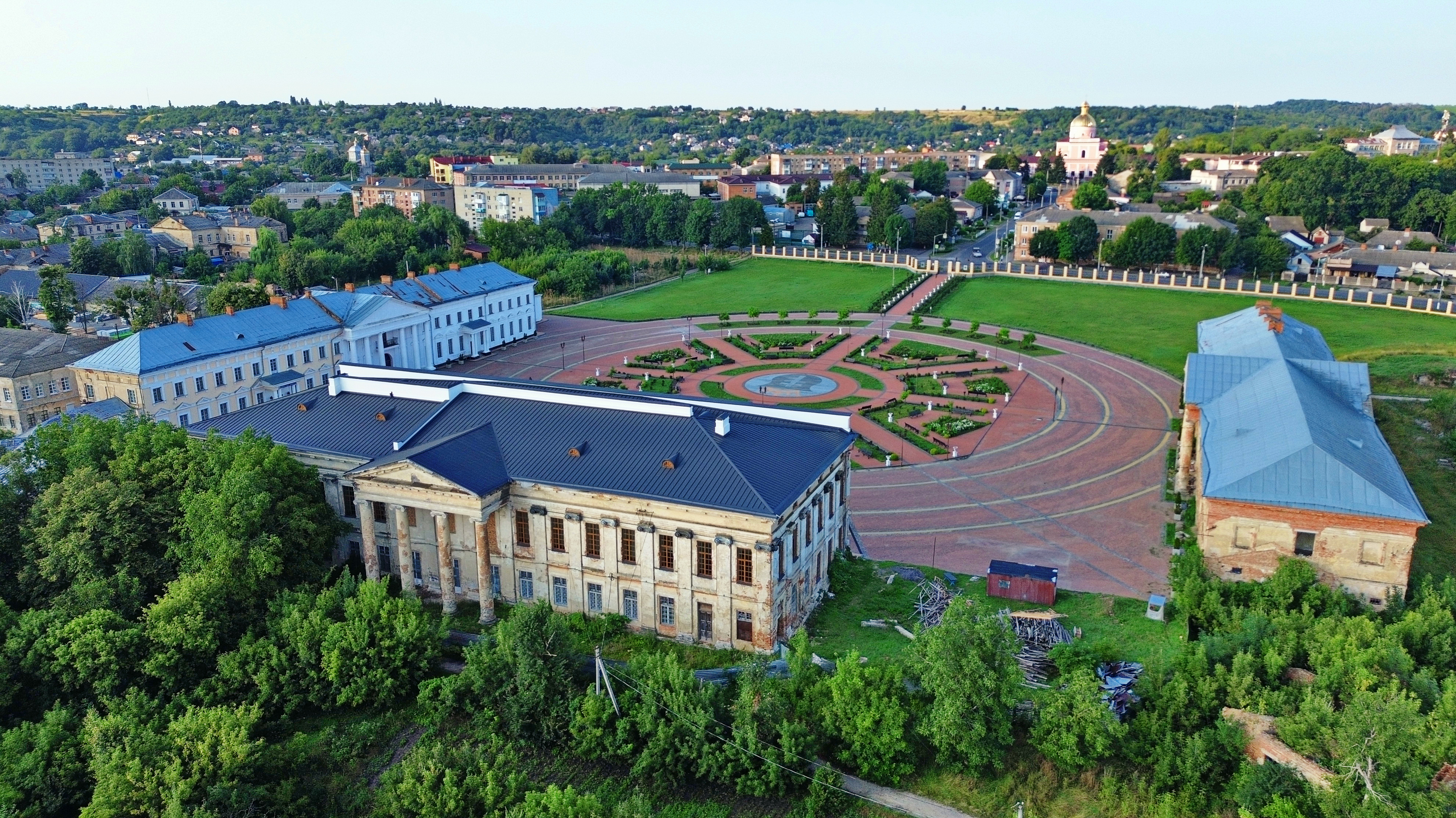
Tulchyn, a small historic city and a minor industrial center

Cities in Vinnytsia Oblast
| Name | Name (in Ukrainian) (Note: Links to the Ukrainian Wikipedia articles for each city) | Raion (district) | Population (2022 estimates) | Population (2001 census) | Population change |
|---|---|---|---|---|---|
| Bar | Бар | Zhmerynka | 15,337 | 17,284 | −11.26% |
| Bershad | Бершадь | Haisyn | 12,205 | 13,336 | −8.48% |
| Haisyn | Гайсин | Haisyn | 25,698 | 25,640 | +0.23% |
| Hnivan | Гнівань | Vinnytsia | 12,191 | 12,832 | −5.00% |
| Illintsi | Іллінці | Vinnytsia | 11,095 | 11,340 | −2.16% |
| Kalynivka | Калинівка | Khmilnyk | 18,492 | 20,061 | −7.82% |
| Khmilnyk | Хмільник | Khmilnyk | 26,916 | 27,898 | −3.52% |
| Koziatyn | Козятин | Khmilnyk | 22,241 | 26,635 | −16.50% |
| Ladyzhyn | Ладижин | Haisyn | 22,459 | 22,219 | +1.08% |
| Lypovets | Липовець | Vinnytsia | 7,958 | 9,406 | −15.39% |
| Mohyliv-Podilskyi | Могилів-Подільський | Mohyliv-Podilskyi | 29,925 | 32,853 | −8.91% |
| Nemyriv | Немирів | Vinnytsia | 11,421 | 12,082 | −5.47% |
| Pohrebyshche | Погребище | Vinnytsia | 9,209 | 10,754 | −14.37% |
| Sharhorod | Шаргород | Zhmerynka | 6,982 | 7,161 | −2.50% |
| Tulchyn | Тульчин | Tulchyn | 14,446 | 16,136 | −10.47% |
| Vinnytsia | Вінниця | Vinnytsia | 369,739 | 356,665 | +3.67% |
| Yampil | Ямпіль | Mohyliv-Podilskyi | 10,679 | 11,787 | −9.40% |
| Zhmerynka | Жмеринка | Zhmerynka | 33,754 | 37,349 | −9.63% |

== See also ==
- List of cities in Ukraine
