= Turbiv =

Rural locality in Vinnytsia Oblast, Ukraine

- Rural settlement
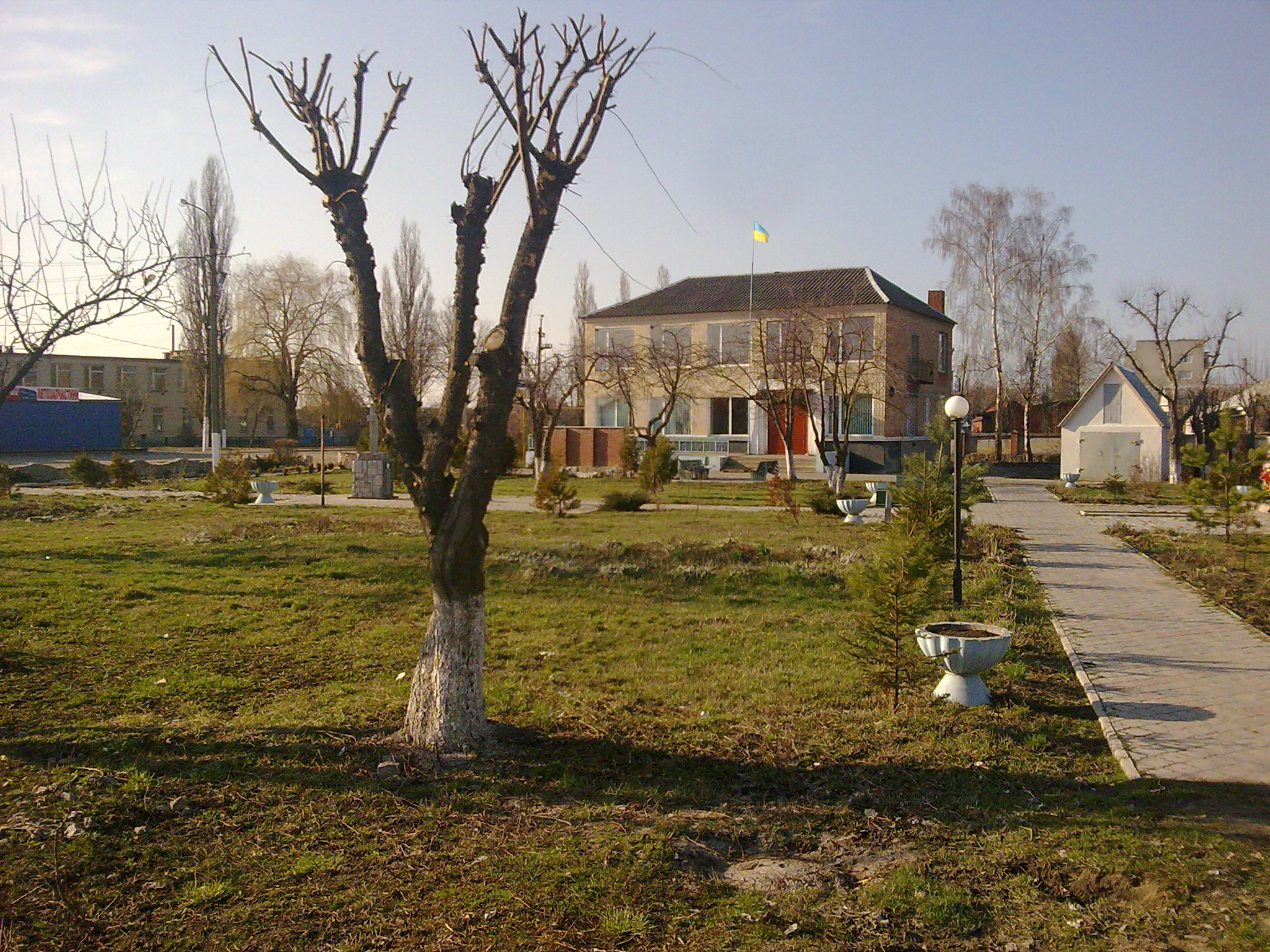

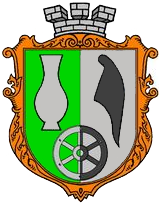
- Coat of arms

- Location within Vinnytsia Oblast Location within Ukraine
- Coordinates: 49°21′N 28°43′E
- Country: Ukraine
- Oblast: Vinnytsia Oblast
- Raion: Vinnytsia Raion
- Founded: 1545

Population (2022)
  - Total: 6,084
- Time zone: UTC+2 (EET)
  - Summer (DST): UTC+3 (EEST)

Turbiv (Ukrainian: Турбів) is a rural settlement in Vinnytsia Raion, Vinnytsia Oblast, Ukraine. It is located in the historic region of Podolia. Population: 6,084 (2022 estimate).

Turbiv is situated 31 km from Lypovets (raion center) and 25 kilometres (16 mi) from Vinnytsia.

== History ==
Historical affiliations

Grand Duchy of Lithuania 1545–1569
Polish–Lithuanian Commonwealth 1569–1672
Ottoman Empire 1672–1699
Polish–Lithuanian Commonwealth 1699–1793
Russian Empire 1793–1917
Ukrainian People's Republic/Ukrainian State 1917-1920
Soviet Ukraine 1920–1922
Soviet Union 1922–1991
Ukraine 1991–present

It was founded in 1545. Until the Partitions of Poland Turbów was part of the Bracław Voivodeship of the Lesser Poland Province of the Polish Crown.

Until 26 January 2024, Turbiv was designated urban-type settlement. On this day, a new law entered into force which abolished this status, and Turbiv became a rural settlement.
