= Desna, Vinnytsia Oblast =

Rural locality in Vinnytsia Oblast, Ukraine

Desna Десна
- Rural settlement
- Location in Vinnytsia Oblast Location in Ukraine
- Country: Ukraine
- Oblast: Vinnytsia Oblast
- Raion: Vinnytsia Raion

Population (2022)
  - Total: 1,265
- Time zone: UTC+2 (EET)
  - Summer (DST): UTC+3 (EEST)

Desna (Ukrainian: Десна) is a rural settlement in Vinnytsia Raion of Vinnytsia Oblast in Ukraine. It is essentially a northern suburb of the city of Vinnytsia. Desna belongs to Vinnytsia urban hromada, one of the hromadas of Ukraine. Population: 1,265 (2022 estimate)

== History ==
Until 26 January 2024, Desna was designated urban-type settlement. On this day, a new law entered into force which abolished this status, and Desna became a rural settlement.

== Economy ==
=== Transportation ===
Stadnytsia railway station is located just outside the settlement, on the railway connecting Vinnytsia and Kyiv via Koziatyn. There is infrequent passenger traffic.

The settlement is adjacent to Highway M12 and Highway M30 which jointly form the northern bypass of Vinnytsia. It is also incorporated to the road network of Vinnytsia.
