= Lypovets Raion =

Former subdivision of Vinnytsia Oblast, Ukraine

Lypovets Raion Липовецький район
- Raion
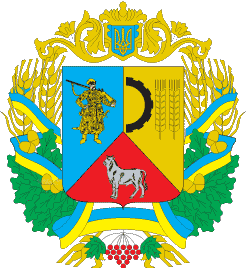
- Flag Coat of arms

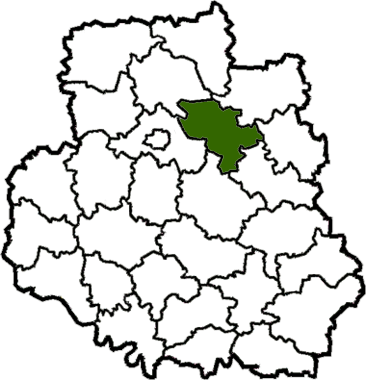
- Coordinates: 49°21′23.7″N 28°43′55.44″E
- Country: Ukraine
- Oblast: Vinnytsia Oblast
- Established: 1923
- Disestablished: 18 July 2020
- Admin. center: Lypovets
- Subdivisions: List: 1 — city councils; 1 — settlement councils; 25 — rural councils; Number of localities: 1 — cities; 1 — urban-type settlements; 50 — villages; — rural settlements

Government
  - Governor: Taras Oleksiuk

Area
  - Total: 970 km^{2} (370 sq mi)

Population (2020)
  - Total: 36,123 ▼
  - Density: 37/km^{2} (96/sq mi)
- Time zone: UTC+02:00 (EET)
  - Summer (DST): UTC+03:00 (EEST)
- Postal index: 22500—22555
- Area code: +380 4358
- Website: http://lipovec-rada.org.ua/

Lypovets Raion (Ukrainian: Липовецький район) was one of raions of Vinnytsia Oblast, located in southwestern Ukraine. The administrative center of the raion was the town of Lypovets. The raion was abolished and its territory was merged into Vinnytsia Raion on 18 July 2020 as part of the administrative reform of Ukraine, which reduced the number of raions of Vinnytsia Oblast to six. The last estimate of the raion population was 36,123 (2020 est.).

== History ==
During the Holodomor more than 30 thousand people in Lypovets Raion died (population in 1932 was 105,394 inhabitants and in 1934 there lived the rest 74965 people).
