= Voronovytsia, Vinnytsia Oblast =

Rural locality in Vinnytsia Oblast, Ukraine

Voronovytsia Вороновиця
- Rural settlement
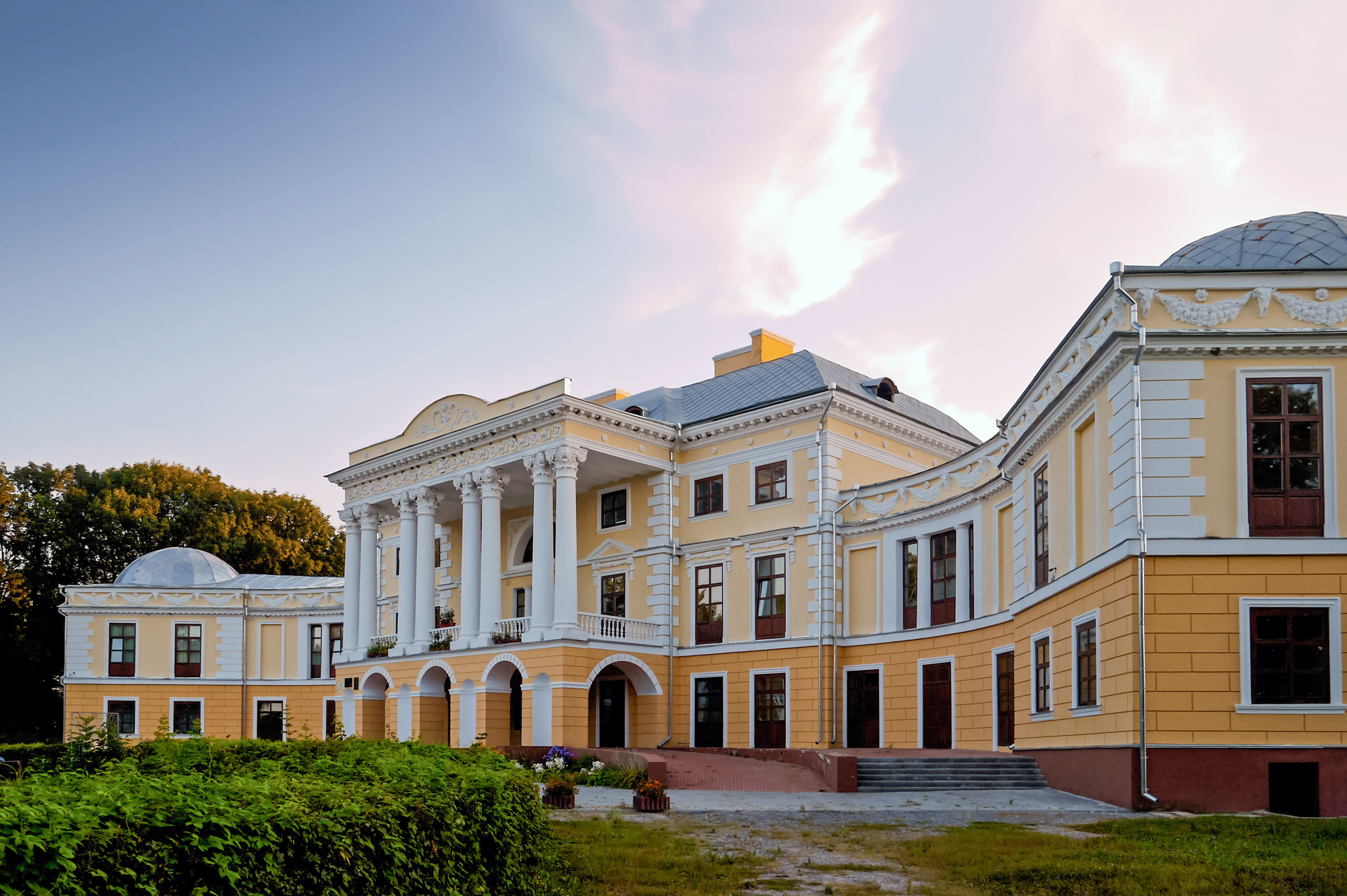
- Grocholski Palace

- Location in Vinnytsia Oblast Location in Ukraine
- Country: Ukraine
- Oblast: Vinnytsia Oblast
- Raion: Vinnytsia Raion

Population (2022)
  - Total: 6,246
- Time zone: UTC+2 (EET)
  - Summer (DST): UTC+3 (EEST)

Voronovytsia (Ukrainian: Вороновиця) is a rural settlement in Vinnytsia Raion of Vinnytsia Oblast in Ukraine. It is located on the banks of the Voronka, a left tributary of the Southern Bug. Voronovytsia hosts the administration of Voronovytsia settlement hromada, one of the hromadas of Ukraine. Population: 6,246 (2022 estimate) It is located in the historic region of Podolia.

== History ==
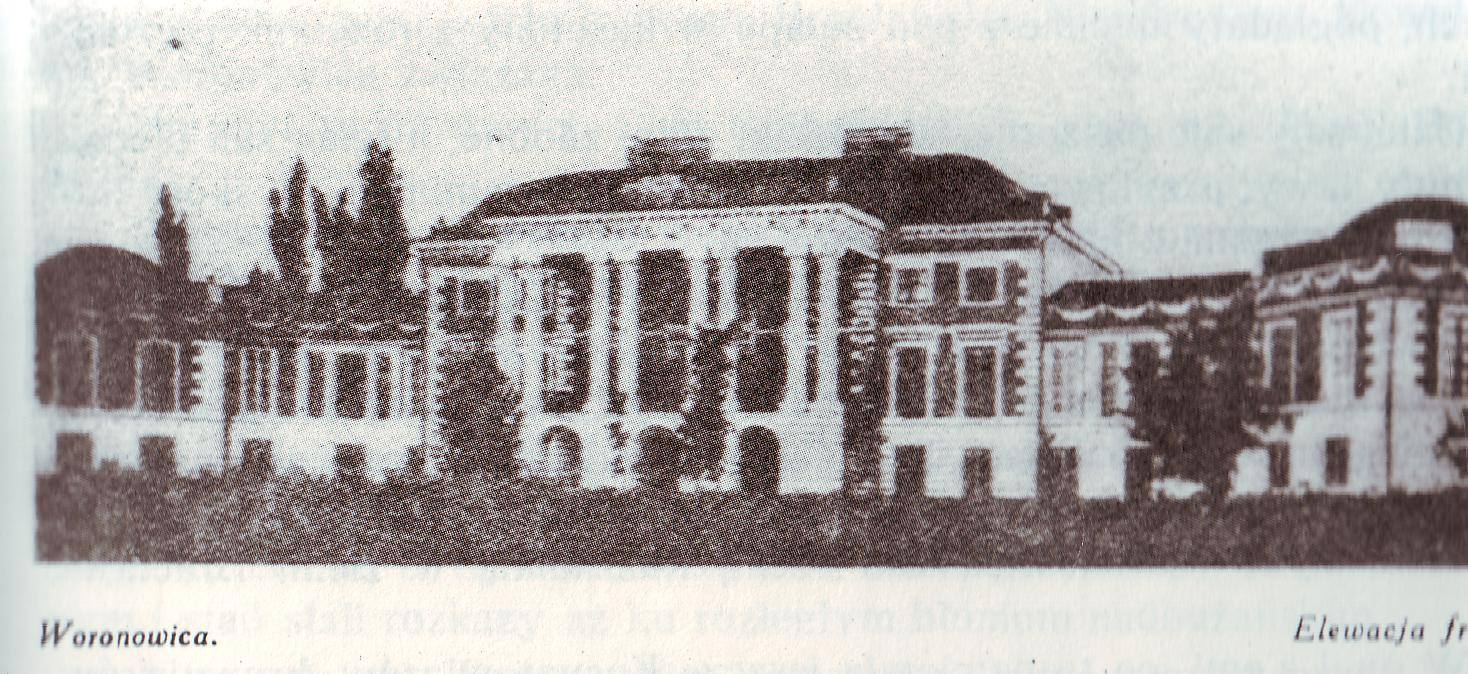
Grocholski Palace in the 1920s

The village was named after the Voronka River, and the settlement appeared in 1545. It was owned by the Woronowicki, Zaleski, Radzimiński and Grochowski noble families. In 1748, by order of King Augustus III of Poland, it was granted town rights. Woronowica, as it was known in Polish, was a private town, administratively located in the Winnica County in the Bracław Voivodeship in the Lesser Poland Province of the Kingdom of Poland. Orthodox and Catholic churches were built in 1777 and 1793. It was annexed by Russia in the Second Partition of Poland in 1793.

Voronovytsia is one of the places that claims to be the birthplace of aviation. In 1876, Alexander Mozhaysky flew a small shuttle on casters, with a spring inside, a wing and a propeller, which he called a "flyer." Mozhaysky later built the first heavier-than-air aircraft in Voronovytsia.

Until 26 January 2024, Voronovytsia was designated urban-type settlement. On this day, a new law entered into force which abolished this status, and Voronovytsia became a rural settlement.

== Palace ==
The settlement's main attraction is the palace of Grocholskis and Mozhayskys, where Mozhaysky lived and worked for seven years. The palace is an example of early classicism, and it has 43 rooms spread over 2500 square meters of total space.

== Economy ==
=== Transportation ===
Voronovytsia railway station is on the railway connecting Vinnytsia and Haisyn. There is infrequent passenger traffic.

M30 highway which connects Vinnytsia and Kropyvnytskyi runs through the settlement.
