= Hnivan =

City in Vinnytsia Oblast, Ukraine

Hnivan Гнівань Hniwań
- City
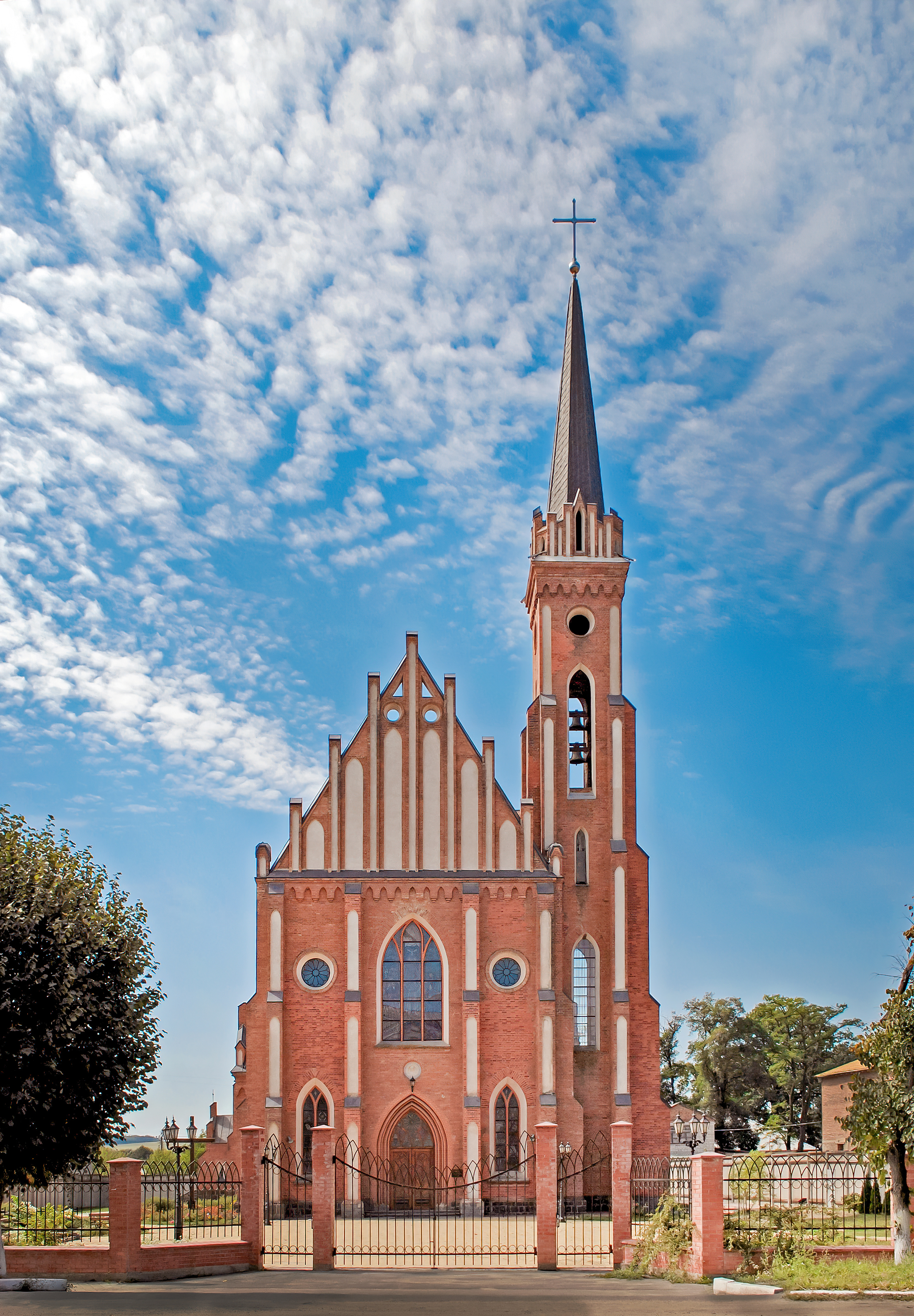
- St. Joseph Cathedral

- Flag Coat of arms

- Location within Vinnytsia Oblast Location within Ukraine
- Coordinates: 49°5′28″N 28°20′55″E
- Country: Ukraine
- Oblast: Vinnytsia Oblast
- Raion: Vinnytsia Raion
- Hromada: Hnivan urban hromada

Population (2022)
  - Total: 12,191
- Time zone: UTC+2 (EET)
  - Summer (DST): UTC+3 (EEST)

Hnivan (Ukrainian: Гнівань [ˈɦn⁽ʲ⁾iwɐnʲ]; Russian: Гнивань, romanized: Gnivan'; Polish: Hniwań) is a city in Vinnytsia Raion, Vinnytsia Oblast, Ukraine. Located on the Southern Buh river, it has a population of 12,191 (2022 estimate).

== History ==
The year 1629 is mistakenly considered the date of the first written mention of the city to this day. This was facilitated by the mention of 1629 as the date of foundation in the multi-volume edition "History of Cities and Villages of the Ukrainian SSR", which was published during 1968–1973 by the Institute of History of the Academy of Sciences of Ukraine.

The settlement within the modern city of Hnivan (except for the territory of the village of Vytava) arose thanks to the laying of the Kyiv-Odesa railway in 1870 (it was then that the built station got the name of the nearest settlement – the village of Hnivan) and one of the largest landowners in Podolia, Yuzef (Josyp) Yaroshynskyi. In 1872, Józef Yaroshyński bought the village from the owner. The village of Tyt Shchenivskyi took the equipment of the sugar factory and transported it to the purchased plot of land near Hnivan station, where the sugar factory is being built.

There were 360 Jews living in the city before World War II, 11% of the total population. The city was under German occupation from 1941 to 1944.

Shortly after the start of the occupation, a group of Jewish men of Hnivan was shot in a field. The rest of the Jews living in Hnivan were registered and forced to perform various kinds of hard labor. In the summer of 1942, about 90 Jews were murdered together with the Jews from neighbor villages in the same place. Today, the place of the shooting is on the grounds of a military base.

In 1913–1938, Hnivan was a village center. After 1938, it was an urban-type settlement.

In 1981, Hnivan received the status of a city.

A serious railway accident (see Hnivan railway accident) took place at Hnivan railway station in June 1991, leading to one fatality.

In 2017, the Hnivan united territorial community was formed, which includes 4 administrative units – the city of Hnivan and the villages of Hryzhyntsi, Demydivka, Mohylivka, with the administrative center in the city of Hnivan. Before unification, the city had been under the district administration from the time it was granted the status of a city (December 11, 1981). The city was formed on the basis of the territories of the urban-type settlement of Hnivan, the neighboring villages of Vytava and Vytavska Slobidka. Since 2017, Hnivan is the administrative center of Hnivan urban hromada.

== Economy ==
Hnivan has been known as a centre of sugar industry and granite production.

== Gallery ==
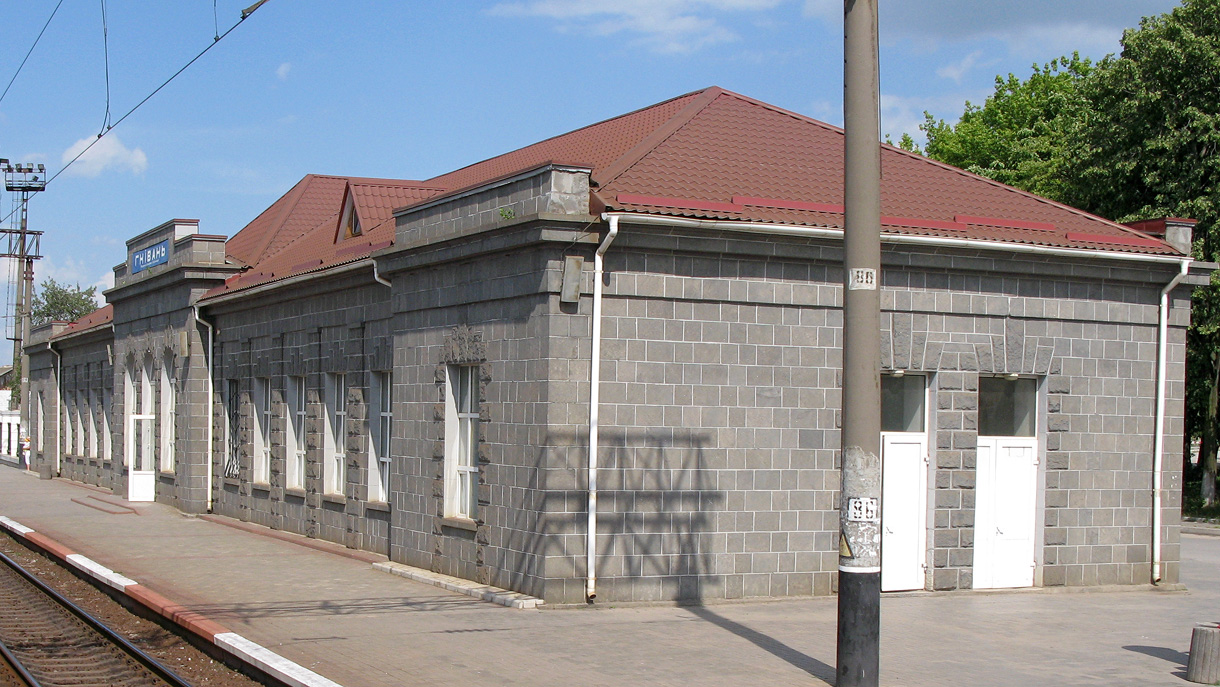
Railway station

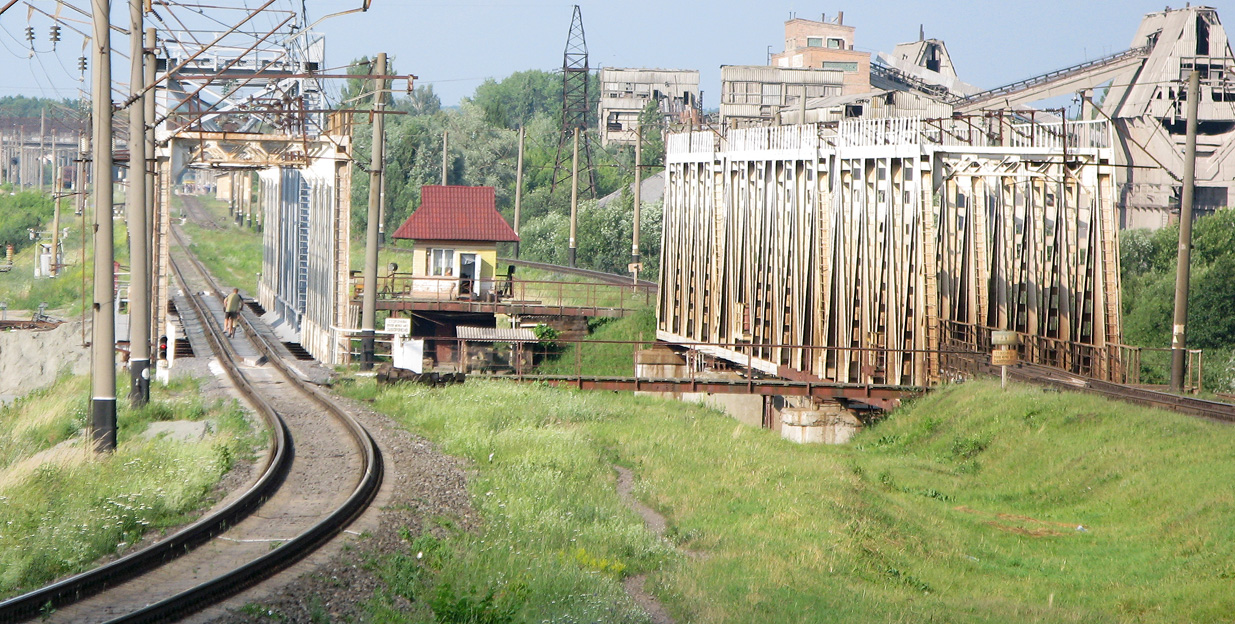
Rail bridge in Hnivan
