= Mervyntsi =

Town in Vinnytsia Oblast, Ukraine

Mervyntsi Мервинцы
- Town
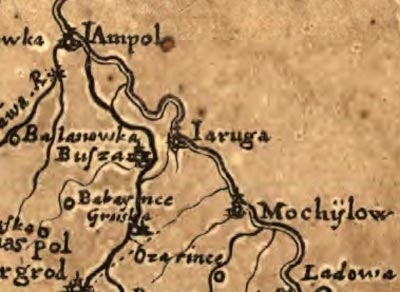
- Beauplan's 1648 map showing the Meryntsi area.

- Location within Vinnytsia Oblast Location within Ukraine
- Coordinates: 48°22′41″N 28°03′05″E
- Country: Ukraine
- Oblast: Vinnytsia Oblast
- Raion: Mohyliv-Podilskyi Raion
- Time zone: UTC+2
  - Summer (DST): UTC+3

Meryntsi (Ukrainian: Мервинцы) is a town the Mohyliv-Podilskyi Raion, Vinnytsia Oblast located near the Dniester river border with Moldova.
