= Hnivan urban hromada =

Hnivan urban hromada Гніванська міська громада
- Hromada
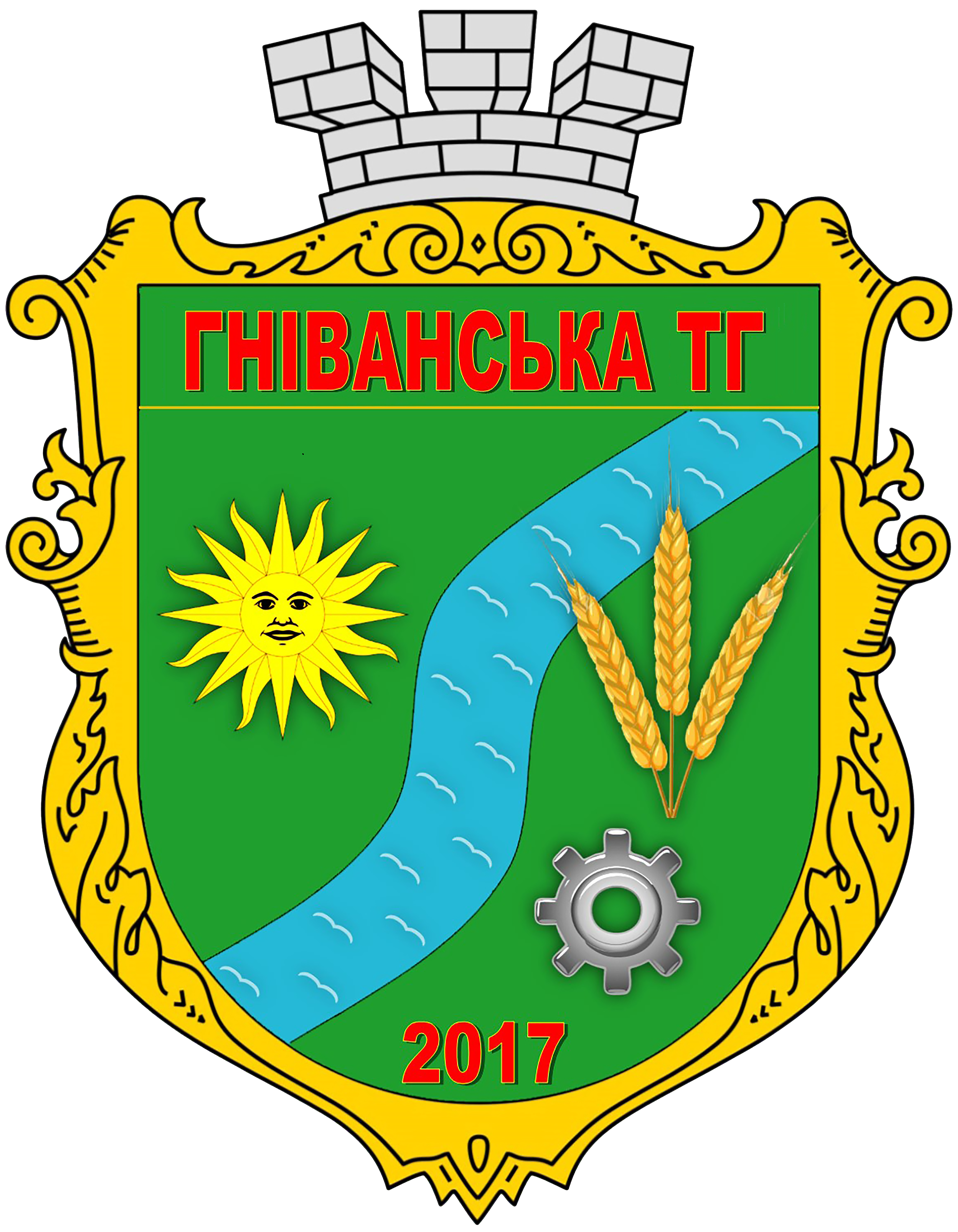
- Seal
- Interactive map of Hnivan urban hromada
- Country: Ukraine
- Oblast: Vinnytsia
- Raion: Vinnytsia

Government
  - Head: Volodymyr Kuleshov

Area
  - Total: 60,960 km^{2} (23,540 sq mi)

Population (2022)
  - Total: 18,446
  - Density: 0.3026/km^{2} (0.7837/sq mi)
- Website: gnivan-miskrada.gov.ua

Hnivan urban hromada is a territorial hromada (municipality) in the Vinnytsia region of Ukraine. The administration of the hromada is located in the city of Hnivan. It was created on 22 November 2016 through the merger of the Hnivan city council with the Demydivka village council. On 25 October 2020 the municipality incorporated the villages of Hryzhyntsi, Mohylivka, Demydivka, Selyshche, Urozhaine, Voroshylivka, Maianiv, Borskiv, Potoky and Ryzhavka. The hromada is divided into 4 starosta districts. Population: 18,446 (2022 estimate)
