= Vinnytsia urban hromada =

Vinnytsia urban hromada Вінницька міська громада
- Hromada
- Seal
- Interactive map of Vinnytsia urban hromada
- Country: Ukraine
- Oblast: Vinnytsia
- Raion: Vinnytsia

Government
  - Head: Serhiy Morhunov

Area
  - Total: 255.06 km^{2} (98.48 sq mi)

Population (2022)
  - Total: 387,439
  - Density: 1,519.0/km^{2} (3,934.2/sq mi)
- Website: vmr.gov.ua

Vinnytsia urban hromada is a territorial hromada (municipality) in the Vinnytsia region of Ukraine. It encompasses the city of Vinnytsia as well as the urban-type settlement of Desna and a number of nearby villages. The hromada covers an area of 255,06 square kilometres. Its population is 387,439 (2022 estimate) The hromada was created on 26 October 2018 after the merger of Vinnytsia city council and Desna settlement council. On 12 June 2020, the villages of Velyki Krushlyntsi, Vinnytski Khutory, Havryshivka, Mali Krushlyntsi, Pysarivka, Stadnytsia and Shchytky were attached to the municipality.
