= Vinnytsia Oblast =

Oblast (region) of Ukraine

Vinnytsia Oblast Вінницька область
- Oblast
- Vinnytska oblast
- Flag Coat of arms
- Nickname: Вінниччина (Vinnychchyna)
- Coordinates: 48.93°N 28.69°E
- Country: Ukraine
- Administrative center: Vinnytsia

Government
  - Governor: Nataliya Zabolotna
  - Oblast council: 84 seats
  - Chairperson: Vyacheslav Sokolovyy

Area
  - Total: 26,513 km^{2} (10,237 sq mi)
  - Rank: Ranked 12th

Population (2021)
  - Total: 1,509,515 ▼
  - Density: 56.935/km^{2} (147.46/sq mi)

GDP
  - Total: ₴ 174 billion (€4.5 billion)
  - Per capita: ₴ 114,218 (€3,000)
- Time zone: UTC+2 (EET)
  - Summer (DST): UTC+3 (EEST)
- Postal code: 21000-23999
- Area code: +380-43
- ISO 3166 code: UA-05
- Raions: 27
- Cities: 18
- Settlements: 29
- Villages: 1466
- HDI (2022): 0.727 high
- FIPS 10-4: UP23
- NUTS statistical regions of Ukraine: UA51
- Website: www.vin.gov.ua

Vinnytsia Oblast (Ukrainian: Вінницька область, romanized: Vinnytska oblast, IPA: [ˈwinːɪtsʲkɐ ˈɔblɐsʲtʲ]), also referred to as Vinnychchyna (Ukrainian: Вінниччина), is an oblast in central Ukraine. Its administrative center is Vinnytsia. The oblast has a population of 1,509,515 (2022 estimate).

== History ==
Vinnytsia Oblast was established on 27 February 1932 as part of an administrative reorganization of the Ukrainian Soviet Socialist Republic. It originally comprised raions that had previously formed parts of several abolished okruhas:

- Uman Okruha
- Berdychiv Okruha
- Vinnytsia Okruha
- Mohyliv Okruha
- Tulchyn Okruha
- Shepetivka Okruha
- Proskuriv Okruha
- Kamianets Okruha

In 1935, territories along the western border of the oblast were reorganized into the Shepetivka, Proskuriv and Kamianets border okrugs. In 1937, these territories were separated from Vinnytsia Oblast to form Kamianets-Podilskyi Oblast, which was later renamed Khmelnytskyi Oblast.

=== World War II and the Holocaust ===
Following the German invasion of the Soviet Union in June 1941, the territory of present-day Vinnytsia Oblast was occupied by German and Romanian forces. The oblast was subsequently divided between two occupation regimes. Its northern and eastern areas were incorporated into the General District of Zhytomyr within the German-administered Reichskommissariat Ukraine, while a substantial part of its southern and southwestern territory was incorporated into the Romanian-administered Transnistria Governorate.

The division placed Jewish communities in the oblast under different German and Romanian systems of persecution. In German-occupied areas, Einsatzgruppen, German police units and their auxiliaries carried out mass shootings of Jews as part of the systematic murder of Jewish communities in the occupied Soviet territories. Mass killings and ghettos were established in a number of communities in the German-controlled portion of the oblast.

In the Romanian-controlled portion of the oblast, Romanian authorities established ghettos, camps and forced-labour sites for local Jews and for Jews deported from Bessarabia and Bukovina. Romanian authorities deported tens of thousands of Jews from those regions to Transnistria, where they were confined alongside local Ukrainian Jews in overcrowded ghettos and camps. Hunger, exposure, disease, forced labour, abuse and mass executions caused widespread mortality.

Numerous communities in present-day Vinnytsia Oblast became sites of ghettos, camps or other Jewish detention sites, including Bershad, Balanivka, Bratslav, Chechelnyk, Dzhuryn, Mohyliv-Podilskyi, Mytky, Obodivka, Olhopil, Pechera, Rohizka, Sharhorod, Tulchyn, Vapniarka and other localities. Some ghettos held both local Jews and thousands of deportees from Bessarabia and Bukovina. In Bershad, for example, thousands of Jews were confined under Romanian rule, while in Bratslav approximately 750 Jews were held in a ghetto before most were transferred to the Pechora concentration camp.

The Vapniarka concentration camp, established by Romanian authorities in October 1941, became one of the best-known camps in the region. Its prisoners included Jews and political prisoners. In 1942, prisoners there were deliberately fed fodder containing toxic grass pea, causing paralysis and other symptoms of lathyrism.

Roma were also deported by Romanian authorities from Romania to the Transnistria Governorate. Thousands died from starvation, disease, exposure and other lethal conditions during their deportation and confinement.

The Red Army recaptured the territory of Vinnytsia Oblast during its westward advance in 1944, ending German and Romanian occupation.

== Geography ==
The oblast is located in the historic regions of Podolia and Right-bank Ukraine and borders seven other administrative oblasts of Ukraine. Along the southwest of the oblast the Dniester river passes. A 202 km (126 mi) long section of the state border with Moldova.

The Vinnytsia oblast has appreciable mineral deposits and other exploitable raw materials. There are 1,159 deposits and other various mineral resources, tens of peat deposits, unique deposits of granite and kaolin, garnet and fluorite that have been explored. The raw kaolin deposits are the world's largest, containing 800 million tons. Furthermore, a number of medicinal mineral springs have been found in the oblast, with health benefits comparable to the radon springs found in the town of Khmilnyk.

The unique decorative qualities of Vinnytsia's granites, sorbites, vinnytsites, and charnockites are used to manufacture stone, facing slabs, window sills, monuments, etc. Three granite deposits (consisting of 10 million cubic metres; 13 million cubic yards) have been explored and are mined, and experimental mining is carried out in eight other deposits. Multiple enterprises have been utilizing these resources for more than a century.

The Vinnytsia oblast is the only oblast of Ukraine containing large pelicanite resources (39 deposits with the total inferred resources of about 170 million tons).

The lignite, commonly known as brown coal, found in Vinnytsia is similar in quality to the well-known lignite of Dniprobas and can be used for energy purposes utilizing the semi-coking and hydrogenation methods. Three lignite deposits in the oblast, containing about 50 million tons, have been preliminarily explored and an additional three deposits are in the exploration stage.

The building materials industry widely uses local sand and gravel. There are five sand deposits, all of which are exploited, of which one is used for silicate bricks, three for building mortars and one for ballast.

The town of Khmilnyk in Vinnytsia is home to a popular radon mineral spring, whose therapeutic properties have been ascertained and utilized for numerous health benefits. Also 21 table water springs have been prospected, ten of which have been certified and at five filling has already been arranged ("Rehina", "Kniazhna", "Shumylivska", "Podilska" and "Rosiana"). Also, "Myrhorodska" type mineral water has been found. It is probable that there are many more radon deposits in the oblast that, once found, can be exploited.

Bauxite, the ore used aluminum manufacturing, has recently been discovered in Podolia. Geologists estimate that this deposit contains about 3 million tons of ore.

== Demographics ==
According to the 2001 Ukrainian census, ethnic Ukrainians accounted for 94.9% of the population of Vinnytsia Oblast, and ethnic Russians for 3.8%.

=== Language ===
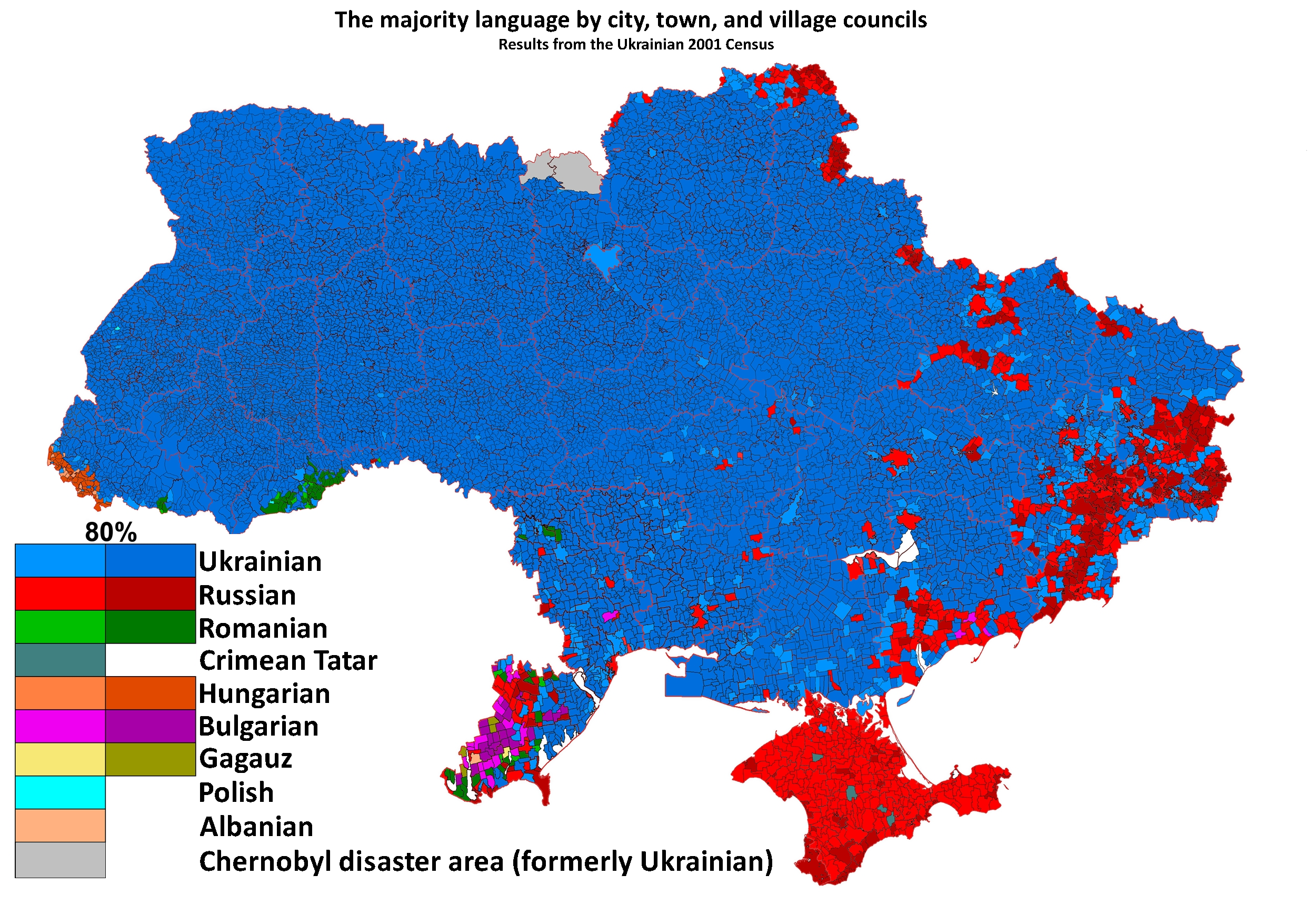
According to the 2001 Ukrainian census, Ukrainian was the native language for almost 95% of Vinnytsia Oblast's population: it was the dominant language in all of the city, town, and village councils of the oblast.

Due to the Russification of Ukraine during the Soviet era, the share of Ukrainian speakers in the population of Vinnytsia Oblast gradually decreased between the 1970 and 1989 censuses, while the share of Russian speakers increased. Native language of the population of Vinnytsia Oblast according to the results of population censuses:

	1959	1970	1989	2001
Ukrainian	90.9%	92.0%	90.7%	94.8%
Russian	6.4%	7.1%	8.6%	4.7%
Other	2.7%	0.9%	0.7%	0.3%

Native language of the population of the raions, cities, and city councils of Vinnytsia Oblast according to the 2001 Ukrainian census:

	Ukrainian	Russian
Vinnytsia Oblast	94.8%	4.7%
City of Vinnytsia	84.7%	14.4%
City of Zhmerynka	90.8%	8.5%
Mohyliv-Podilskyi (city council)	92.3%	7.0%
Koziatyn (city council)	94.9%	4.8%
Ladyzhyn (city council)	88.4%	11.3%
City of Khmilnyk	97.1%	2.6%
Bar Raion	97.4%	2.4%
Bershad Raion	97.2%	2.5%
Vinnytsia Raion (in pre-2020 borders)	97.6%	2.0%
Haisyn Raion (in pre-2020 borders)	96.3%	3.5%
Zhmerynka Raion (in pre-2020 borders)	97.7%	2.1%
Illintsi Raion	98.1%	1.4%
Koziatyn Raion	98.3%	1.3%
Kalynivka Raion	97.8%	2.0%
Kryzhopil Raion	98.8%	0.9%
Lypovets Raion	98.8%	1.1%
Lityn Raion	98.5%	1.4%
Mohyliv-Podilskyi Raion (in pre-2020 borders)	98.2%	1.6%
Murovani Kurylivtsi Raion	98.8%	1.1%
Nemyriv Raion	97.5%	2.1%
Orativ Raion	99.1%	0.7%
Pishchanka Raion	97.6%	1.6%
Pohrebyshche Raion	98.8%	1.1%
Teplyk Raion	98.8%	0.9%
Tomashpil Raion	96.6%	2.9%
Trostianets Raion	98.1%	1.7%
Tulchyn Raion (in pre-2020 borders)	96.9%	2.8%
Tyvriv Raion	96.4%	3.1%
Khmilnyk Raion (in pre-2020 borders)	99.1%	0.7%
Chernivtsi Raion	99.2%	0.6%
Chechelnyk Raion	98.5%	1.2%
Sharhorod Raion	98.9%	0.9%
Yampil Raion	97.6%	1.7%

Ukrainian is the only official language on the whole territory of Vinnytsia Oblast.

According to a poll conducted by Rating from 16 November to 10 December 2018 as part of the project «Portraits of Regions», 75% of the residents of Vinnytsia Oblast believed that the Ukrainian language should be the only state language on the entire territory of Ukraine. 12% believed that Ukrainian should be the only state language, while Russian should be the second official language in some regions of the country. 8% believed that Russian should become the second state language of the country. 5% found it difficult to answer.

On 15 August 2024, Vinnytsia Oblast Military Administration approved the «Programme for the Development and Functioning of the Ukrainian Language in All Spheres of Life in Vinnytsia Oblast for 2024—2028», the main objective of which is to strengthen the positions of the Ukrainian language in various spheres of public life in the oblast.

According to the research of the Content Analysis Centre, conducted from 15 August to 15 September 2024, the topic of which was the ratio of Ukrainian and Russian languages in the Ukrainian segment of social media, 82.6% of posts from Vinnytsia Oblast were written in Ukrainian (78.5% in 2023, 73.5% in 2022, 26.2% in 2020), while 17.4% were written in Russian (21.5% in 2023, 26.5% in 2022, 73.8% in 2020).

After Ukraine declared independence in 1991, Vinnytsia Oblast, as well as Ukraine as a whole, experienced a gradual Ukrainization of the education system, which had been Russified during the Soviet era. Dynamics of the ratio of the languages of instruction in general secondary education institutions in Vinnytsia Oblast:

Language of instruction, % of pupils	1991— 1992	1992— 1993	1993— 1994	1994— 1995	1995— 1996	2000— 2001	2005— 2006	2007— 2008	2010— 2011	2012— 2013	2015— 2016	2018— 2019	2021— 2022	2022— 2023
Ukrainian	81.3	83.8	87.4	89.9	91.0	98.0	99.0	99.0	99.5	99.6	99.6	99.7	99.96	100,0
Russian	18.7	16.2	12.6	10.1	9.0	2.0	1.0	1.0	0.5	0.4	0.4	0.3	0.04	—

According to the State Statistics Service of Ukraine, in the 2023—2024 school year, all 161,470 pupils in general secondary education institutions in Vinnytsia Oblast were studying in classes where Ukrainian was the language of instruction.

=== Age ===
Overall
0-14 years: 14.9% ▲ (male 124,640/female 117,422)
15-64 years: 68.1% (male 531,953/female 571,923)
65 years and over: 17.0% ▼ (male 88,770/female 185,245) (2013 official)
Median
total: 40.4 years ▲
male: 37.1 years ▲
female: 43.5 years ▲ (2013 official)

== Historical sites ==
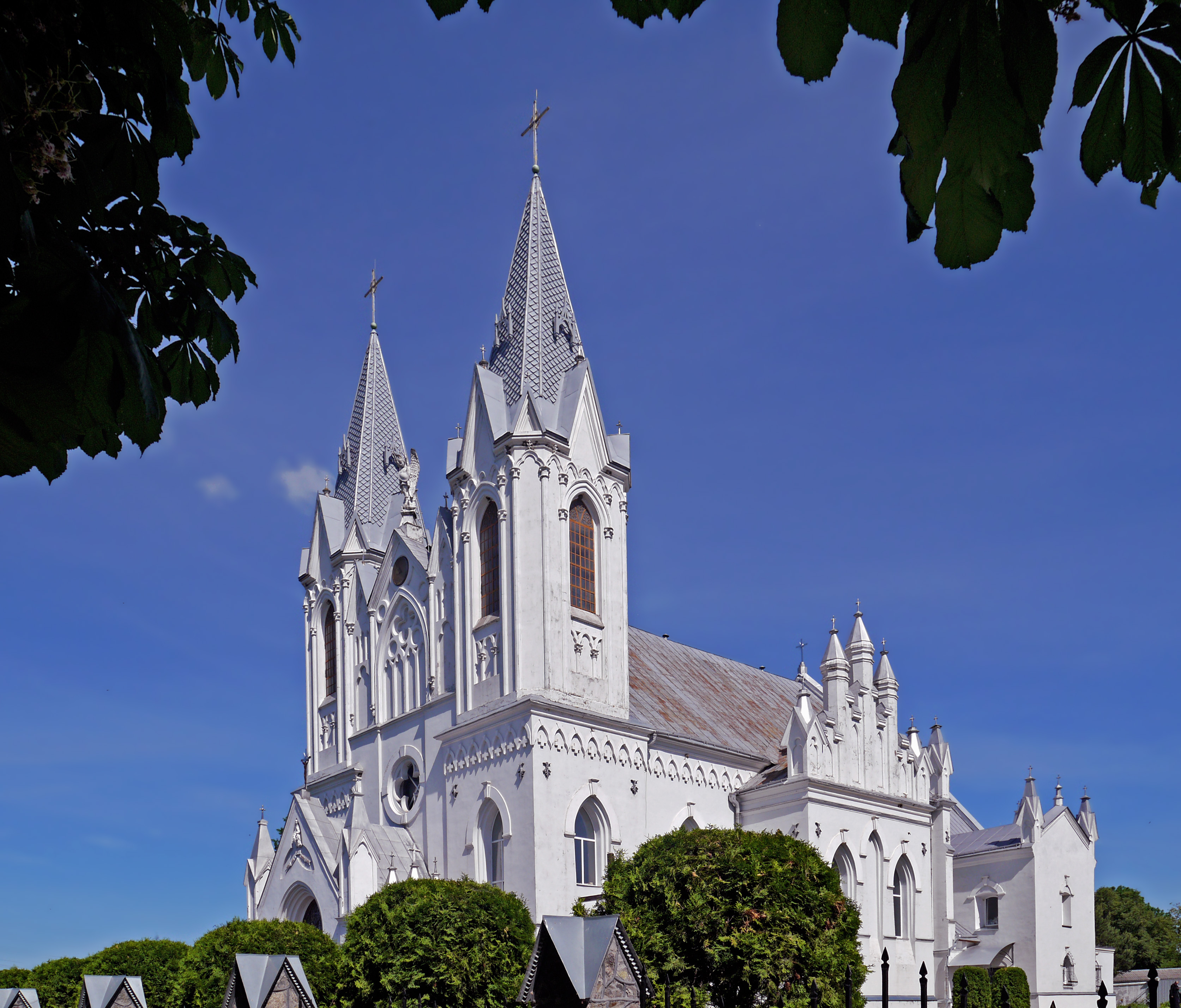
Saint Anne church, Bar

The old historical castles in Bar attract a big number of domestic visitors and foreign tourists every year, including:

- St. Pokrovsky Orthodox Church;
- St. Anna Roman Catholic Cathedral;
- St. Pokrovsky Monastery;
- Old Fortress.

The city of Bar is a popular tourist location because it is where the mathematician Viktor Bunyakovsky was born.

The following sites were nominated for the Seven Wonders of Ukraine.

- The Villa of Mykola Pyrogov
- Nemyriv Scythian settlement
- Ancient Slavic cave temple (Bushi relief)

The Podillya's folk icon-painting tradition is well known in Ukraine. Its manifestation are long home iconostases painted on canvas in the end of the 19th - beginning of the 20th cc. Red, green and yellow colours are prevailing, the faces of the saints depicted are a little bit long, their eyes are almond-like. On these iconostases, the most worshipped family saints were painted. The collections of Podillya's folk iconostases are possessed by Vynnytsya Art Museum and The Museum of Ukrainian Home Icons in the Radomysl Castle.

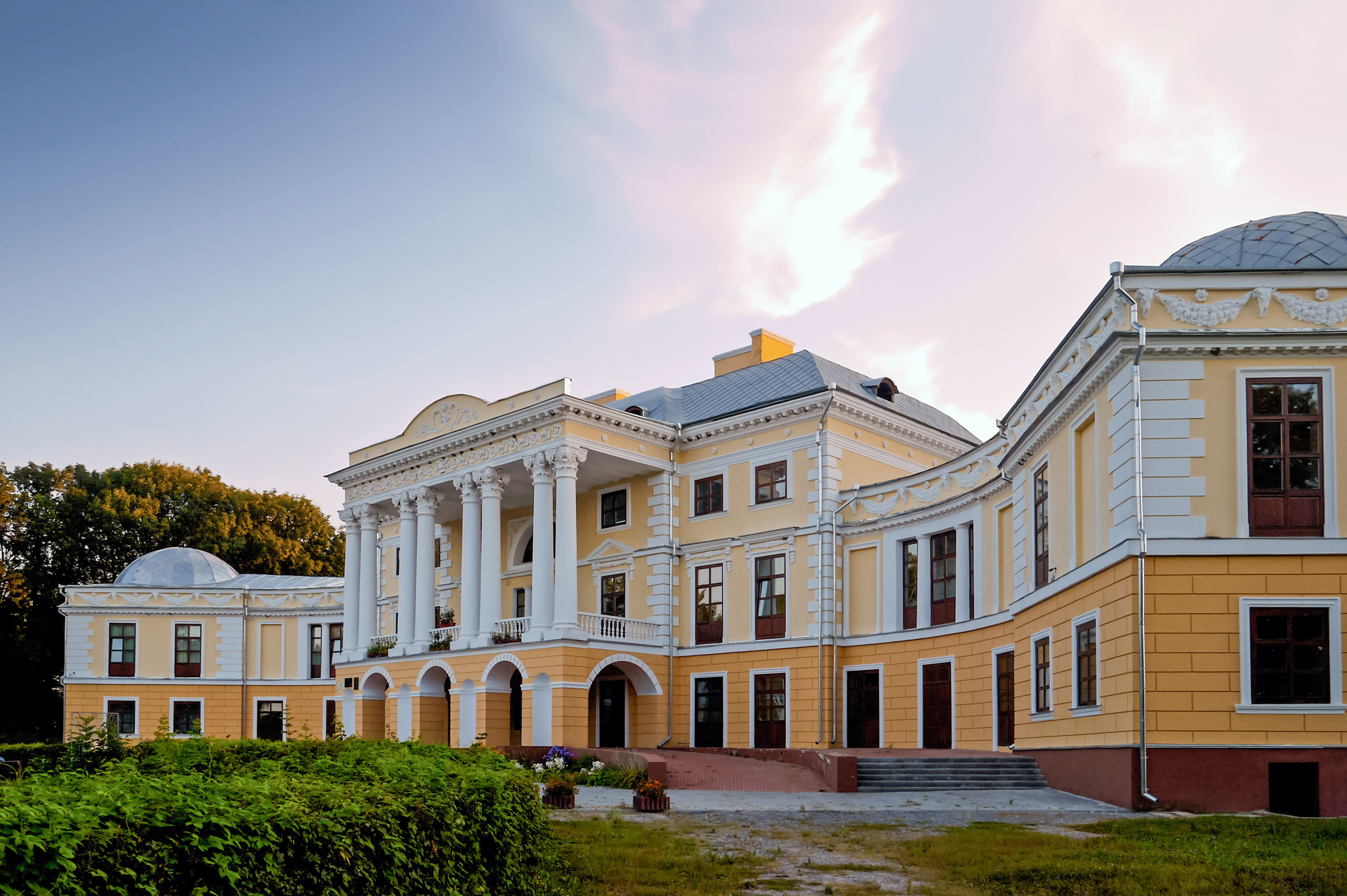
Grocholski Palace in Voronovytsia

There are several palaces in the province, the most notable in Tulchyn, Voronovytsia, Khmilnyk, Nemyriv and Cherniatyn.

== Economics ==
=== Industry ===
The oblast's industrial potential is represented by such enterprises as the Ladyzhyn thermal power station, associations "Zhovten", "Infrakon", "Maiak", "Krystal", "Vinnytsia Bearing Works", "Khimprom", tens of processing and light industry enterprises. In all about 400 enterprises of various industrial sectors are functioning in the oblast. The largest of them are situated in the oblast capital.

The Vinnytsia oblast has 12.7% of the industrial production potential, 2% of the cost of fixed production assets and 2.6% of the industrial output.

The oblast has a multisectoral industrial complex, where leading places are held by the food industry, machine building and metalworking.

Over 400 industrial enterprises of 13 industrial sectors are functioning in the oblast. Main of them are food industry (57.5%), electric power industry (15.6%), machine building and metalworking (9.4%), chemical and petrochemical industry (5.7). Microbiology and medicine are developing.

72 machine building enterprises are specialized in manufacture of products in 12 industrial sectors, the main of which are electrical engineering, machine tool and toolmaking, instrument engineering, bearing, tractor and farm machinery industries. The Vinnytsia oblast's machine building products include metal cutting tools, pumps, rolling bearings, water, gas and heat flow meters, electric motors, electric spindles, computer facilities, production equipment for processing industries, farm machinery for plant growing and animal husbandry, integrated circuits, semiconductor and vacuum electronic devices, high economy luminescent lamps, stereoanagraphs, scales, automobile lifters, mills, milking equipment, etc.

The share of consumer goods output in the oblast in their total production in Ukraine is of 5.7% (1996). They are manufactured by 359 enterprises.

The oblast specializes in production of foodstuffs. The total output of consumer goods in 1996 made 81.1%, domestic and recreational purpose goods 9.0% and light industry products 6.4%.

In the output of consumer foodstuffs in 1996 the Vinnytsia oblast was the second and of non food goods took the 11th place among the oblasts of Ukraine.

Main positions in the structure of production of domestic and recreational goods are held by products manufactured at enterprises of the machine building complex, chemical and defense industries: complex domestic facilities, small mechanization means for household plots and small holdings, domestic chemistry goods.

Among the light industry enterprises is of great use concluding agreements with foreign firms to manufacture goods from the raw material supplied by the customer of the products. Cooperation with firms of Germany, USA, Slovakia, Czech, Hungary, India and others has been established. In 1996 the Vinnytsia joint-stock company "Podillia", public joint stock company "Khmilnyk Garment Factory 'Lileia'", Vinnytsia public joint stock company "Volodarka", joint stock company "Tulchin Garment Factory" and others worked on raw materials supplied by the foreign firm's customers.

The electric power generating capacity of power plants at the oblast's territory is 10,523,400 kWh per year. At present, they are under loaded. The electric power generation in 1996 produced 3,548 kWh, while its consumption in the same year was 5,041,000 kWh.

The oblast has 39 sugar factories and 13 distilleries. The industry for processing sunflower seeds and groats crops has been productive.

=== Agriculture ===
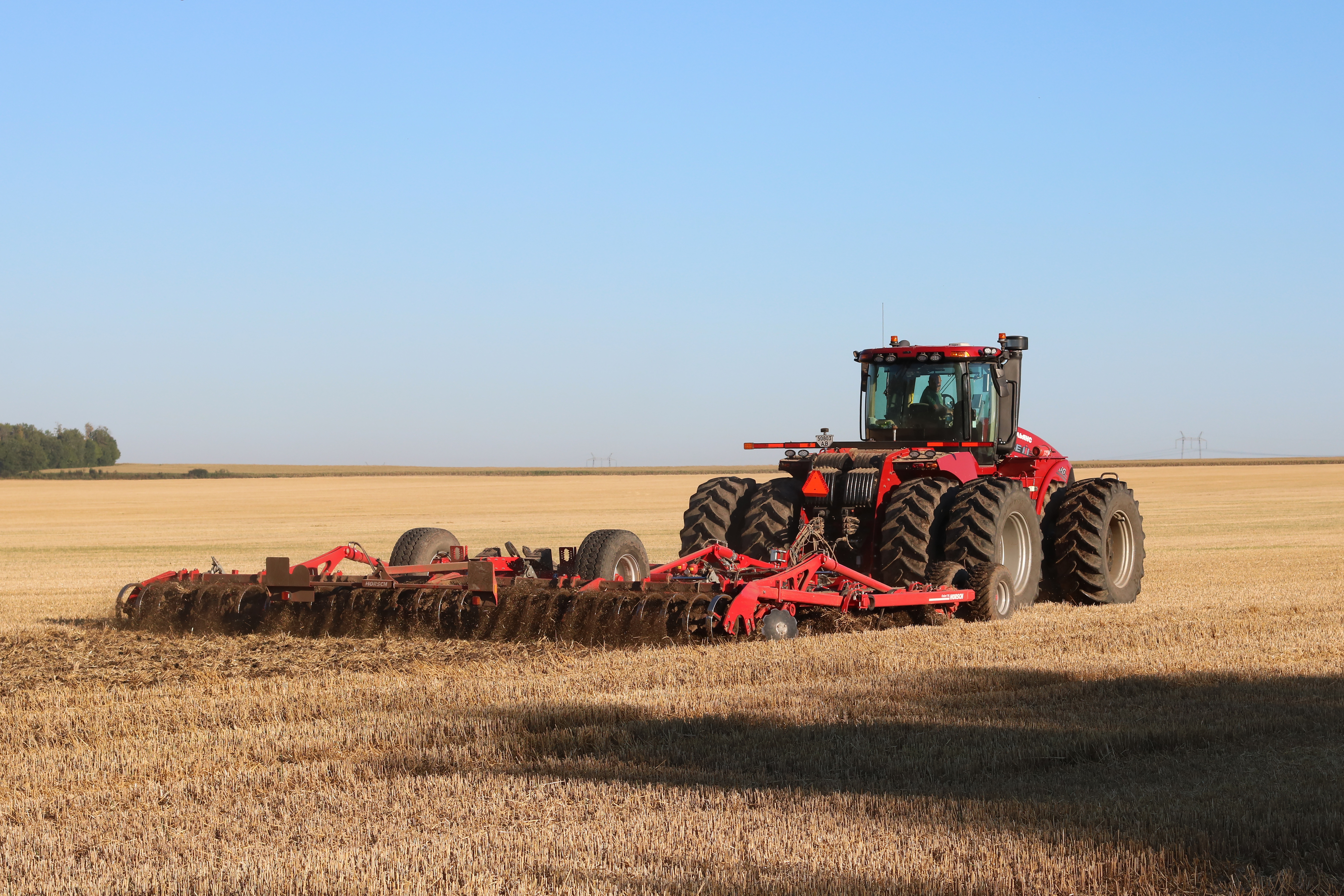
Plowing in Vinnytsia Oblast (2026)

The total farmland area is 19,605 square kilometres (7570 sq. mi.); of them, arable lands occupy 16,940 km² (6540 sq. mi.), and perennial plantations, 512 km² (198 sq. mi.).

As of 1 January 1997 in the oblast there were functioning 749 collective agricultural enterprises, 56 state farms of all systems, 25 inter farm agricultural enterprises, and 818 private (peasant's) farms.

Agricultural enterprises of all forms of ownership are primarily specialized in growing of cereal crops and sugar beets, the animal husbandry, meat and milk production. In the overall structure of sown areas, winter wheat crops occupy 18%, barley 14% and sugar beets 10%.

In 1996 the oblast produced 7% of grain, 14.3% of sugar beets, 7.5% of fruits and berries, 6.1% of meat in live weight, 5.4% of milk and 4.0% of eggs of their total production in Ukraine.

=== Transport and Communications ===
Three trunk pipelines cross the oblast's territory: Urengoi-Pomary-Uzhhorod, "Soiuz" and Dashava-Kyiv. 3,299.8 km (2050 miles) of gas distributing networks are in service. It was planned to put 261 km (162 mi) of gas networks in operation in 1997.

=== Foreign Economic Relations ===
In 1996 enterprises and organizations of the oblast executed foreign trade operations with partners from 73 countries of the world. The total foreign trade volume for this period made $397,500,000, including export ($280,900,000) and import ($116,600,000), which resulted in positive balance ($164,300,000).

The oblast's foreign trade with CIS and Baltic countries in this time reached 58.2% of the total foreign trade turnover. The largest export deliveries are to the Russian Federation (42.6%), Belarus (5.4%), Belgium (7.2%) and Germany (7.45%).

No considerable changes have taken place in the structure of commodity exports. As before, leading in this field are the food industry (47.5%), light industry (14.18%), machine building (10.96%), chemical industry (5.09%) and agriculture (6.36%).

Enterprises of the Vinnytsia oblast seek to import urgently needed products which are in short supply. Main items of import in 1996 were mineral fertilizers (2.68%), petroleum products (10.27%), equipment (11.63%), surface transport facilities (3.82%), inorganic chemistry products, electrical machines, fabrics and yarn.

Taking into account main lines of production, considerable quantities of farm machinery and equipment for processing and building materials industries are brought to its territory. Owing to this agricultural enterprises of the oblast managed in 1996 to perform a full range of fieldwork and obtained a good harvest of cereal and industrial crops.

At the same time large quantities of products that are not in demand of population as well as goods manufactured in sufficient quantities by the oblast's enterprises are brought to the oblast. Moreover, a considerable amount of valuable raw leather is brought out on so called "tolling" terms in exchange of poor quality semi manufactures, footwear, leather jackets, etc.

Of special concern is the fact that enterprises of the oblast are steeply reducing import of the equipment, spare parts, completing items, while import of alcoholic drinks, juices, and other low grade consumer goods is rising. As shown by calculations, the oblast, having a considerable export/import potential, has real opportunities through an effective use of the foreign trade to increase revenues both of the local and of the state budget and to provide itself with the necessary "critical" products.

The oblast's enterprises seek to attract foreign investments for increasing the output of products. Since 1991 till December 1997 about 300 joint enterprises with foreign investments amounting to $23,300,000 were established in the Vinnytsia oblast. Enterprises and citizens from 41 countries of the world participated in organization of the enterprises. The largest amount of investments came from the United States, Germany, Poland, Israel and some other countries.

Oblast is one of the founding members of Euroregion Dniester.

== Subdivisions ==
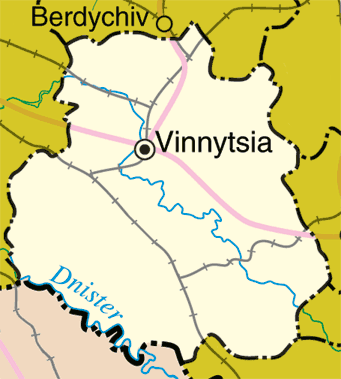
A map fragment showing Vinnytsia Oblast

The Vinnytsia Oblast was founded on February 27, 1932, its area makes 4.5% of the state's territory. Administratively the oblast's territory is divided into 6 districts (raions). The oblast has 17 cities, 30 towns and 1,467 villages.

Name	Center	Center population	Area (km^{2})	Population (thousand people)	Hromadas
Vinnytsia Raion	Vinnytsia	370,7	6888,9	657,6	16
Haisyn Raion	Haisyn	25,8	5674,8	243,3	14
Zhmerynka Raion	Zhmerynka	34,3	3150,6	165,8	8
Mohyliv-Podilskyi Raion	Mohyliv-Podilskyi	31,2	3220,5	146,9	7
Tulchyn Raion	Tulchyn	14,9	3858,4	157,2	9
Khmilnyk Raion	Khmilnyk	27,4	3701,1	188,3	9

Hromada	Type	Center	Raion
Vinnytsia	city	Vinnytsia	Vinnytsia
Zhmerynka	city	Zhmerynka	Zhmerynka
Mohyliv-Podilskyi	city	Mohyliv-Podilskyi	Mohyliv-Podilskyi
Koziatyn	city	Koziatyn	Khmilnyk
Ladyzhyn	city	Ladyzhyn	Haisyn
Khmilnyk	city	Khmilnyk	Khmilnyk
Bar	city	Bar	Zhmerynka
Kopayhorod	town	Kopayhorod	Zhmerynka
Bershad	city	Bershad	Haisyn
Dzhulynka	village	Dzhulynka	Haisyn
Voronovytsia	town	Voronovytsia	Vinnytsia
Stryzhavka	town	Stryzhavka	Vinnytsia
Ahronomichne	village	Ahronomichne	Vinnytsia
Luka-Meleshivska	village	Luka-Meleshivska	Vinnytsia
Yakushyntsi	village	Yakushyntsi	Vinnytsia
Haisyn	city	Haisyn	Haisyn
Krasnopilka	village	Krasnopilka	Haisyn
Kunka	village	Kunka	Haisyn
Severynivka	village	Severynivka	Zhmerynka
Stanislavchyk	village	Stanislavchyk	Zhmerynka
Illintsi	city	Illintsi	Vinnytsia
Dashiv	town	Dashiv	Haisyn
Hlukhivtsi	town	Hlukhivtsi	Khmilnyk
Makhnivka	village	Makhnivka	Khmilnyk
Samhorodok	village	Samhorodok	Khmilnyk
Kalynivka	city	Kalynivka	Khmilnyk
Ivaniv	village	Ivaniv	Khmilnyk
Kryzhopil	town	Kryzhopil	Tulchyn
Horodkivka	village	Horodkivka	Tulchyn
Lypovets	city	Lypovets	Vinnytsia
Turbiv	town	Turbiv	Vinnytsia
Lityn	town	Lityn	Vinnytsia
Vendychany	town	Vendychany	Mohyliv-Podilskyi
Yaryshiv	village	Yaryshiv	Mohyliv-Podilskyi
Murovani Kurylivtsi	town	Murovani Kurylivtsi	Mohyliv-Podilskyi
Nemyriv	city	Nemyriv	Vinnytsia
Bratslav	town	Bratslav	Tulchyn
Rayhorod	village	Rayhorod	Haisyn
Orativ	town	Orativ	Vinnytsia
Pishchanka	town	Pishchanka	Tulchyn
Studena	village	Studena	Tulchyn
Pohrebyshche	city	Pohrebyshche	Vinnytsia
Teplyk	town	Teplyk	Haisyn
Sobolivka	village	Sobolivka	Haisyn
Vapniarka	town	Vapniarka	Tulchyn
Tomashpil	town	Tomashpil	Tulchyn
Trostianets	town	Trostianets	Haisyn
Obodivka	village	Obodivka	Haisyn
Tulchyn	city	Tulchyn	Tulchyn
Shpykiv	town	Shpykiv	Tulchyn
Hnivan	city	Hnivan	Vinnytsia
Sutysky	town	Sutysky	Vinnytsia
Tyvriv	town	Tyvriv	Vinnytsia
Zhdaniv	village	Viytivtsi	Khmilnyk
Ulaniv	village	Ulaniv	Khmilnyk
Chernivtsi	town	Chernivtsi	Mohyliv-Podilskyi
Babchyntsi	village	Babchyntsi	Mohyliv-Podilskyi
Chechelnyk	town	Chechelnyk	Haisyn
Olhopil	village	Olhopil	Haisyn
Sharhorod	city	Sharhorod	Zhmerynka
Dzhuryn	village	Dzhuryn	Zhmerynka
Murafa	village	Murafa	Zhmerynka
Yampil	city	Yampil	Mohyliv-Podilskyi
Mervyntsi	town	Mervyntsi	Mohyliv-Podilskyi

== Nomenclature ==
Most of Ukraine's oblasts are named after their capital cities, officially referred to as "oblast centers" (Ukrainian: обласний центр, translit. oblasnyi tsentr). The name of each oblast is a relative adjective, formed by adding a feminine suffix to the name of respective center city: Vinnytsia is the center of the Vinnyts'ka oblast' (Vinnytsia Oblast). Most oblasts are also sometimes referred to in a feminine noun form, following the convention of traditional regional place names, ending with the suffix "-shchyna" or "chyna", as is the case with the Vinnytsia Oblast, Vinnychchyna.

== Gallery ==
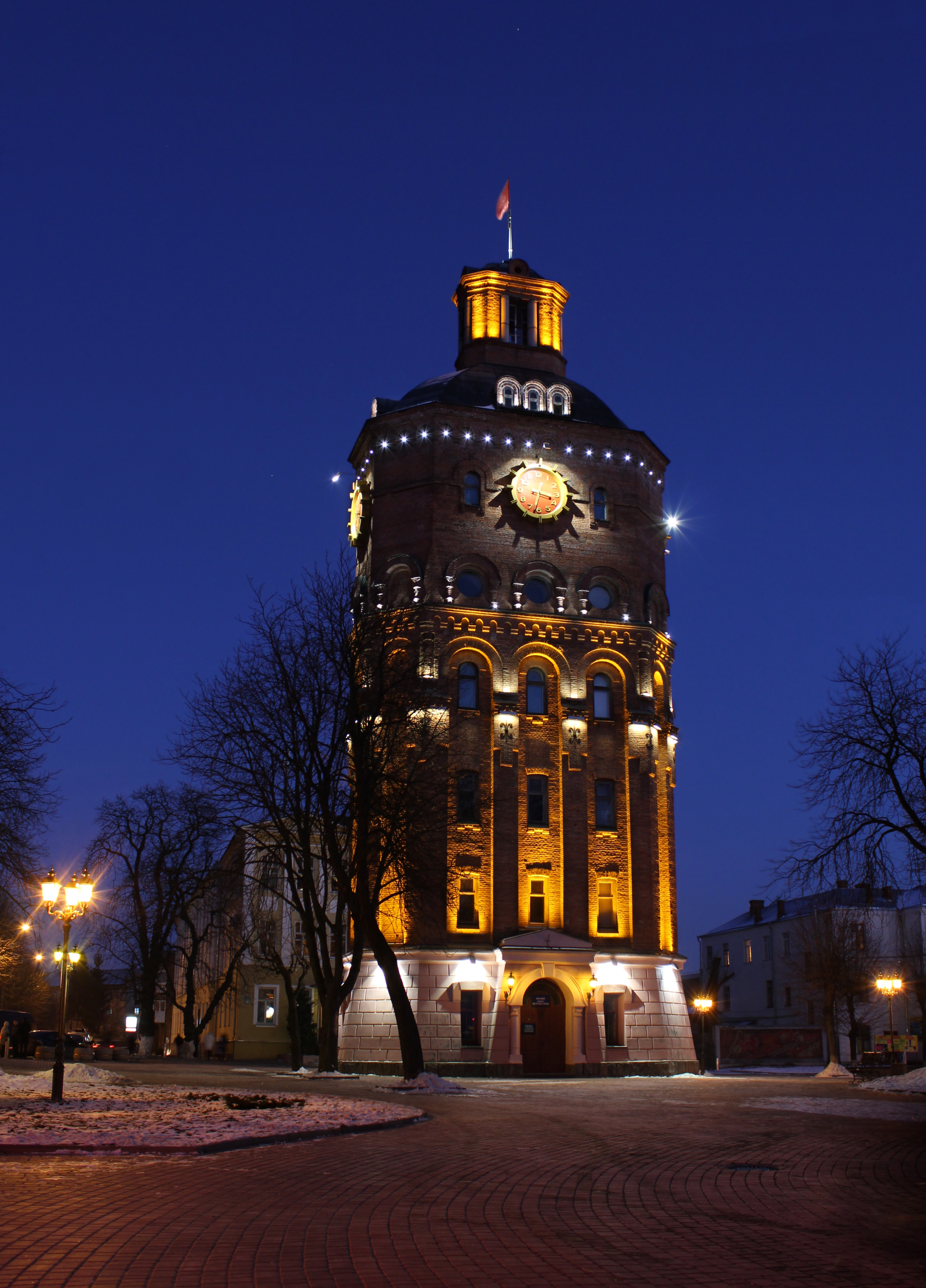
The former water tower in the center of Vinnytsia

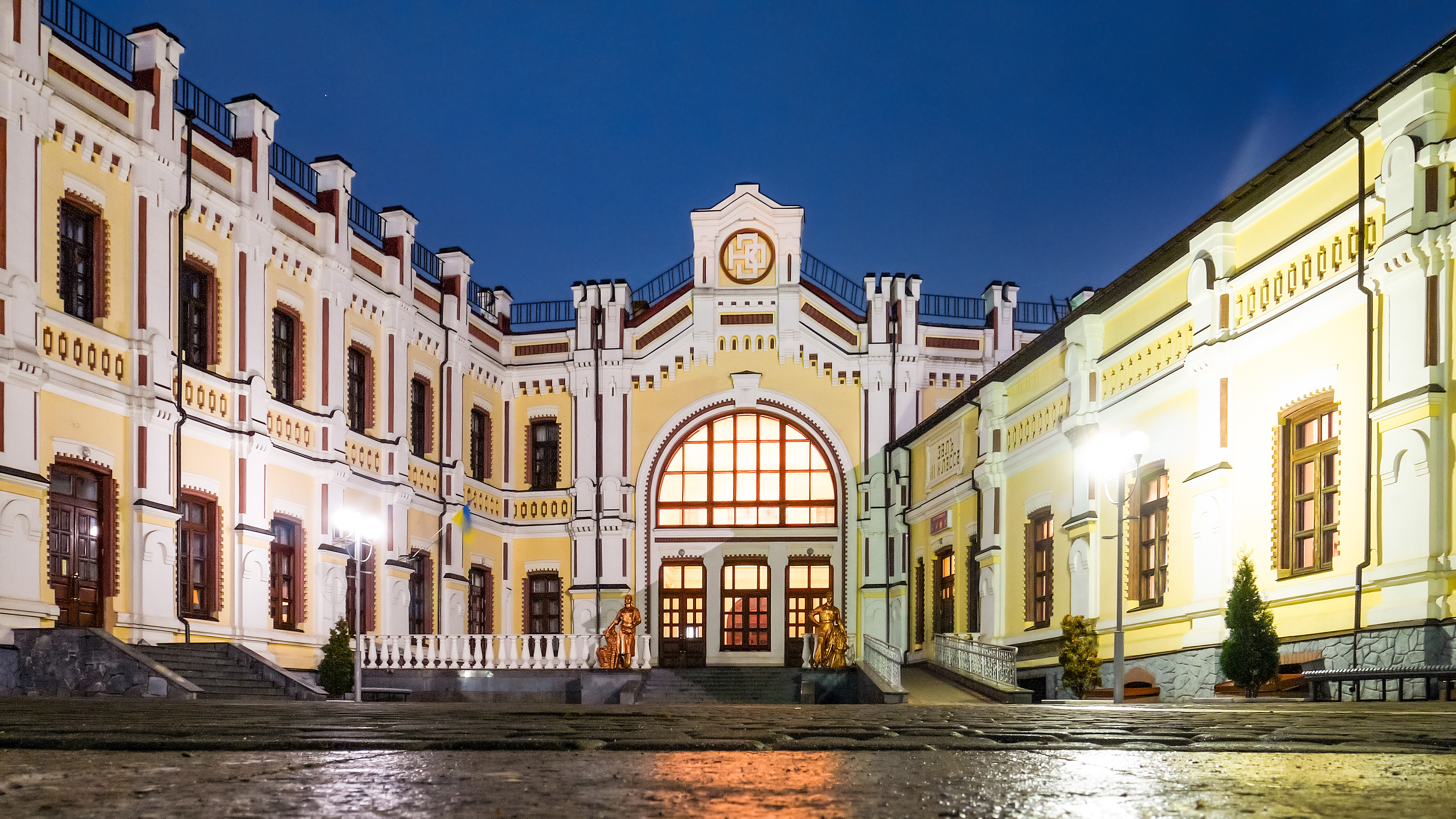
Koziatyn railway station

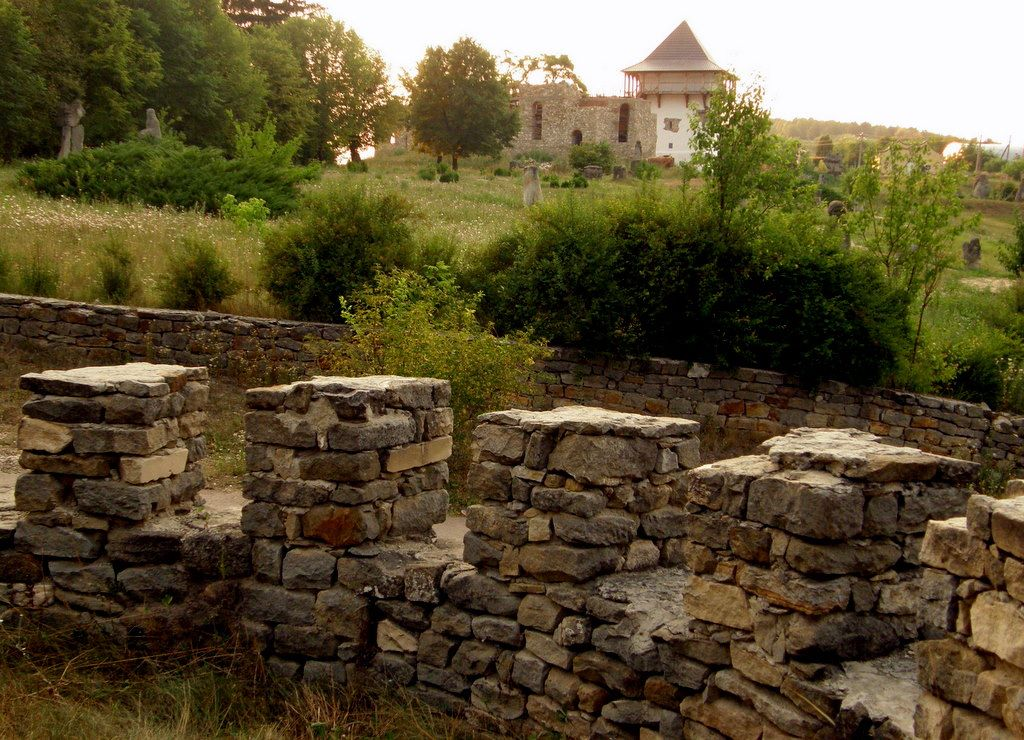
Busha Historic Reserve

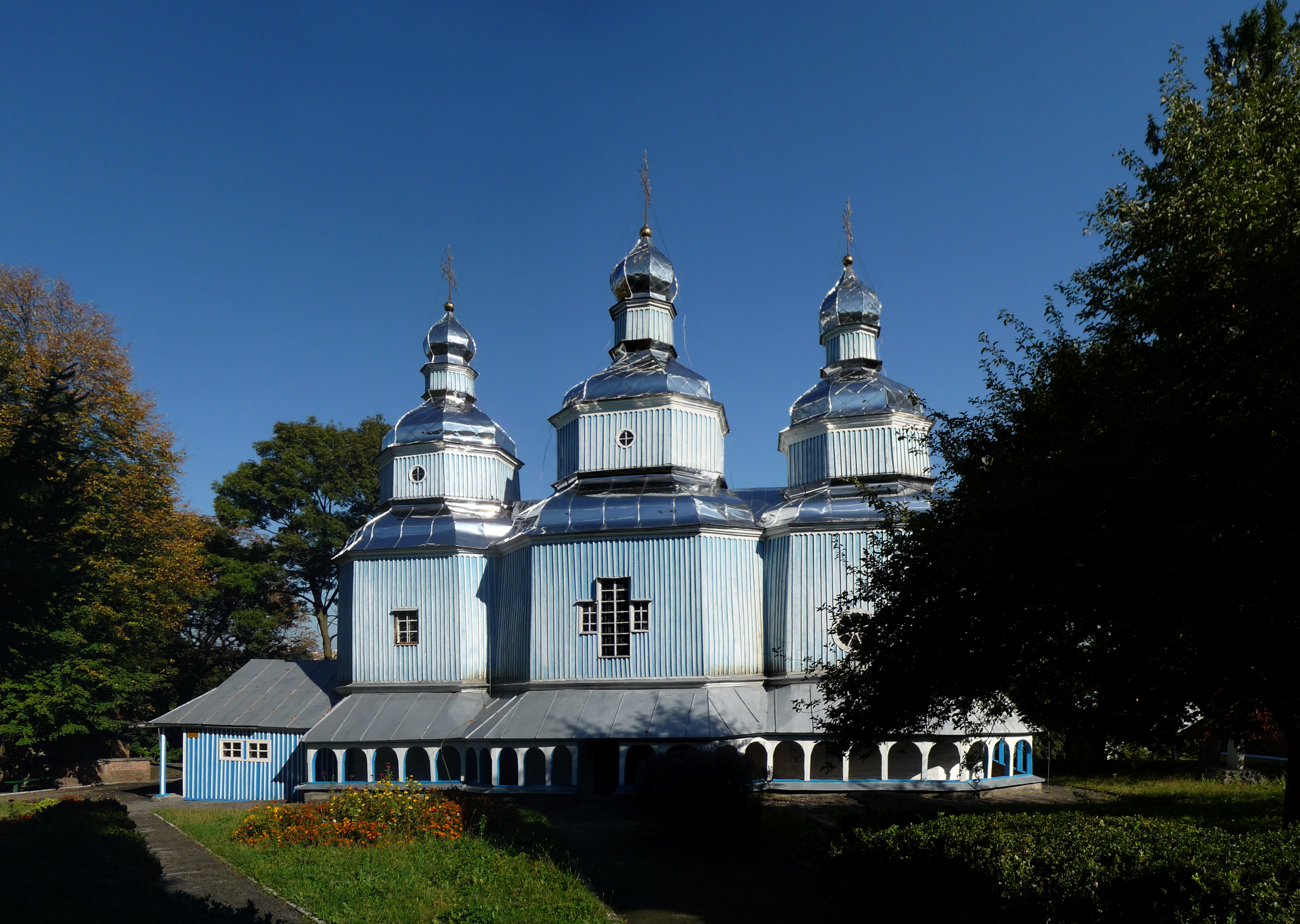
St. Nicholas Church in Vinnytsia

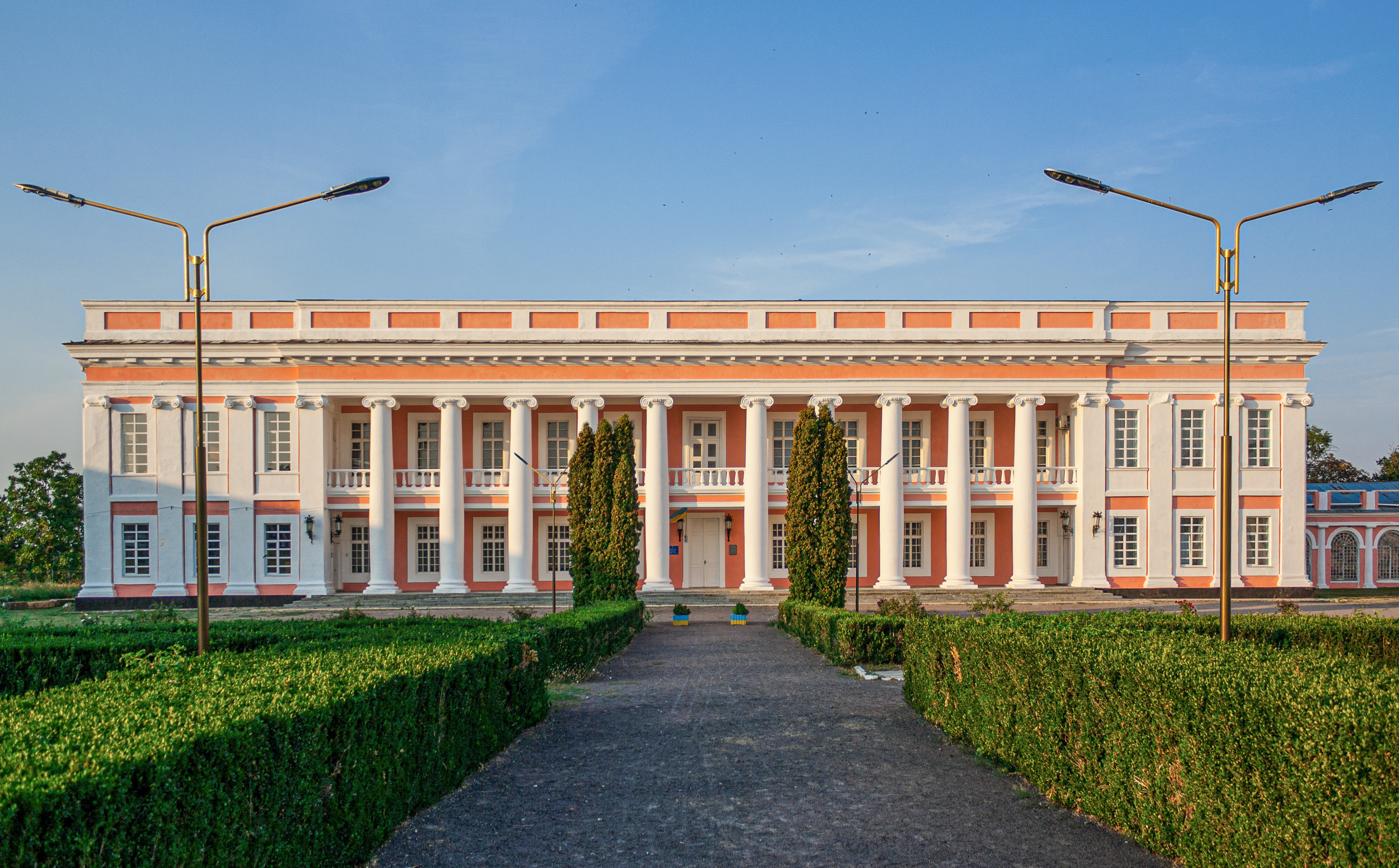
Potocki Palace in Tulchyn

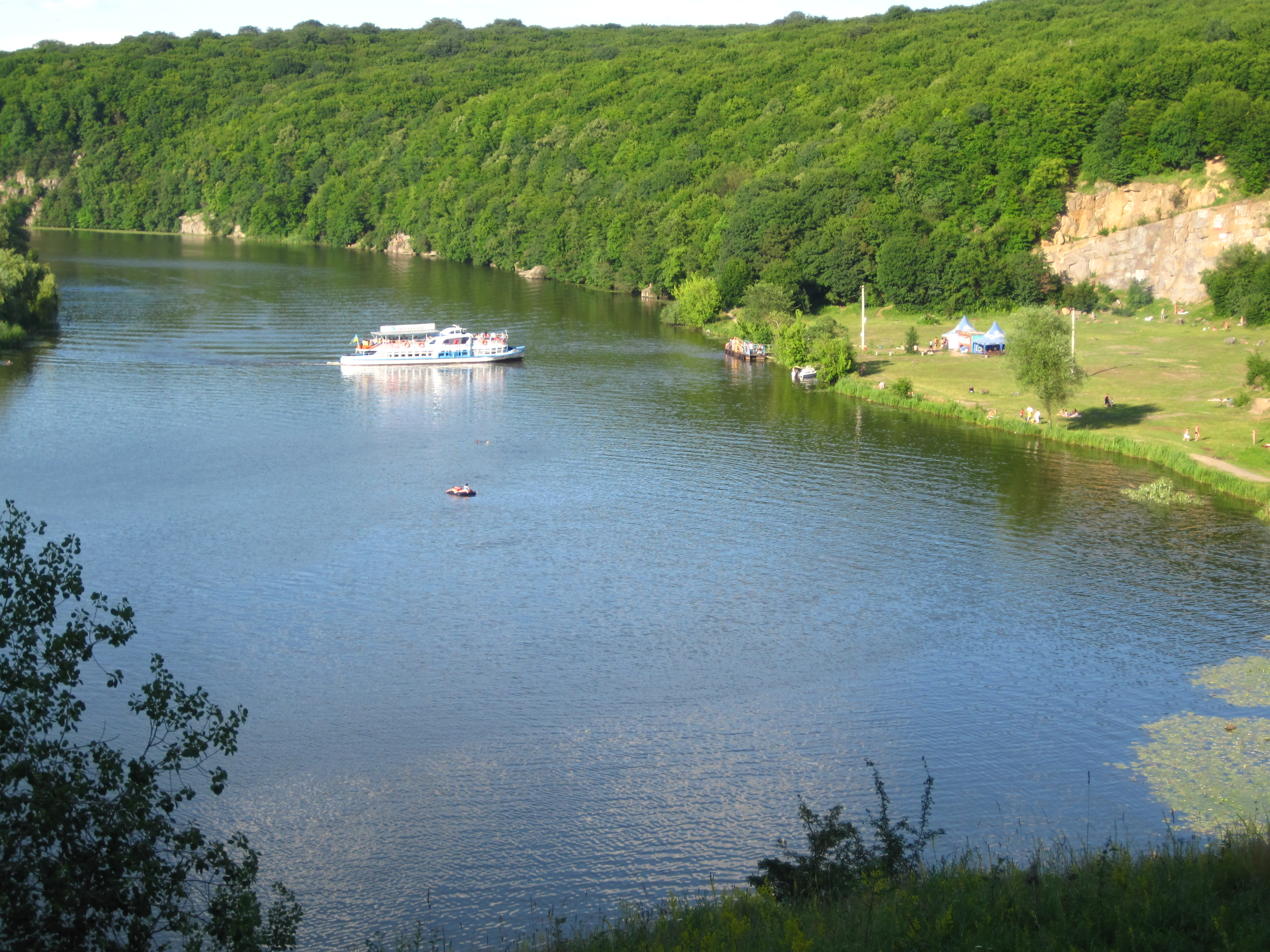
Reservoir in Vinnytsia

== See also ==
- Seven Wonders of Ukraine
- Subdivisions of Ukraine
