= Lypovets =

City in Vinnytsia Oblast, Ukraine

Lypovets Липовець
- City
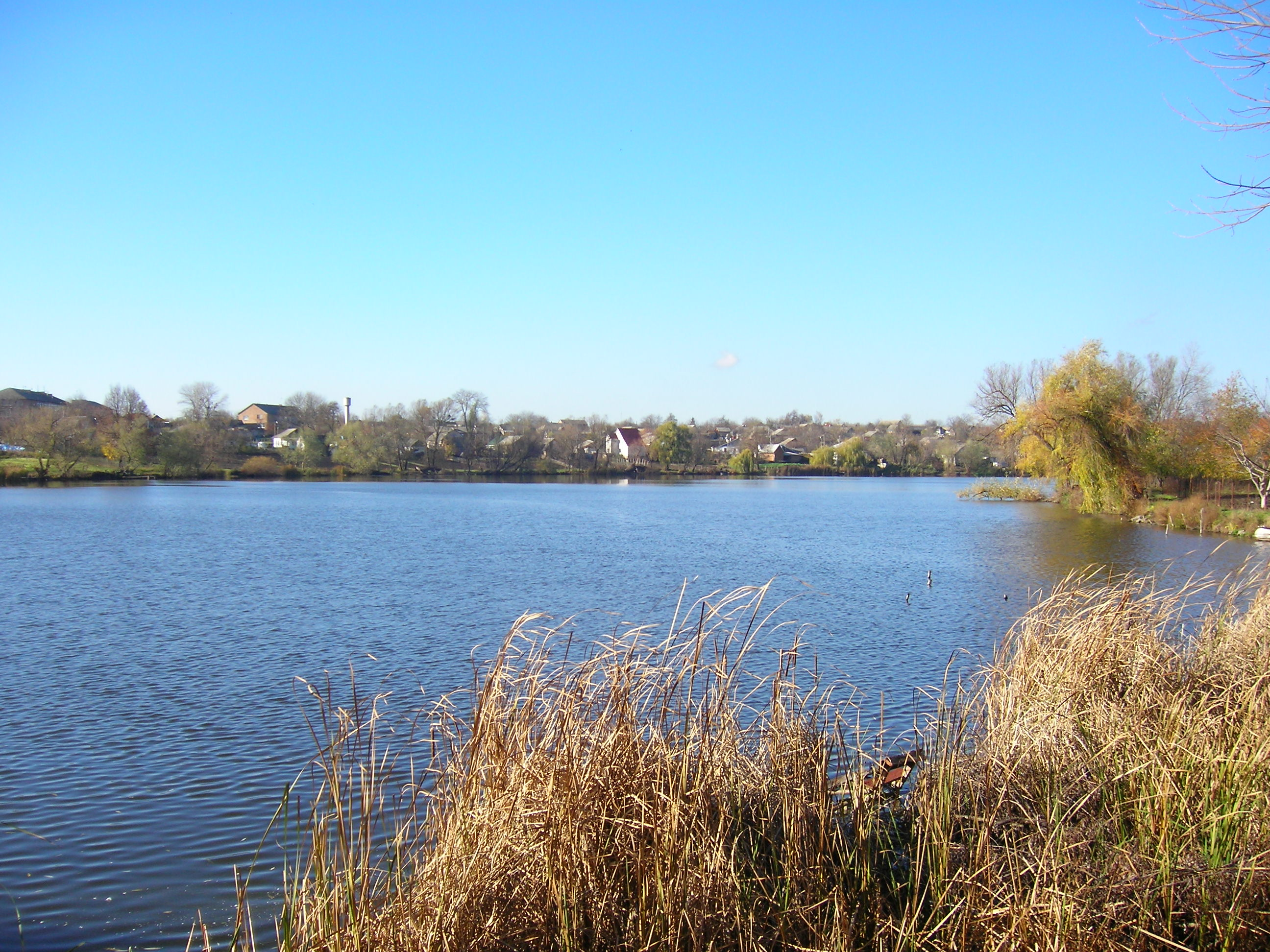
- Lypovets skyline

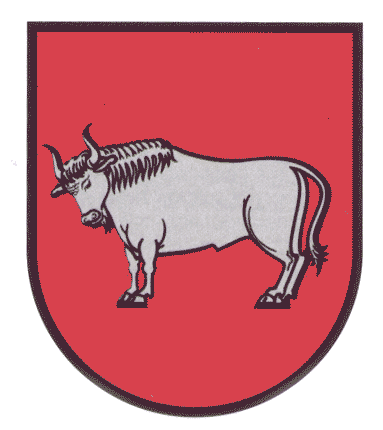
- Coat of arms

- Map of Ukraine with Lypovets highlighted Lypovets (Ukraine)
- Coordinates: 49°13′15″N 29°03′25″E
- Country: Ukraine
- Oblast: Vinnytsia Oblast
- Raion: Vinnytsia Raion
- Hromada: Lypovets urban hromada

Area
  - Total: 10.33 km^{2} (3.99 sq mi)
- Elevation: 242 m (794 ft)

Population (2022)
  - Total: 7,958
  - Density: 770.4/km^{2} (1,995/sq mi)
- Demonym: Lypovets'
- Time zone: UTC+2 (EET)
  - Summer (DST): UTC+3 (EEST)
- Postal code: 22500-22505
- Area code: +380-4358

Lypovets (Ukrainian: Липовець, IPA: [ˈlɪpowetsʲ], Polish: Lipowiec) is a small city in Vinnytsia Raion, Vinnytsia Oblast, Ukraine. Until the administrative reform of 2020, it served as the administrative center of the former Lypovets Raion. Population: 7,958 (2022 estimate). It is located in the historic region of Podolia.

== History ==
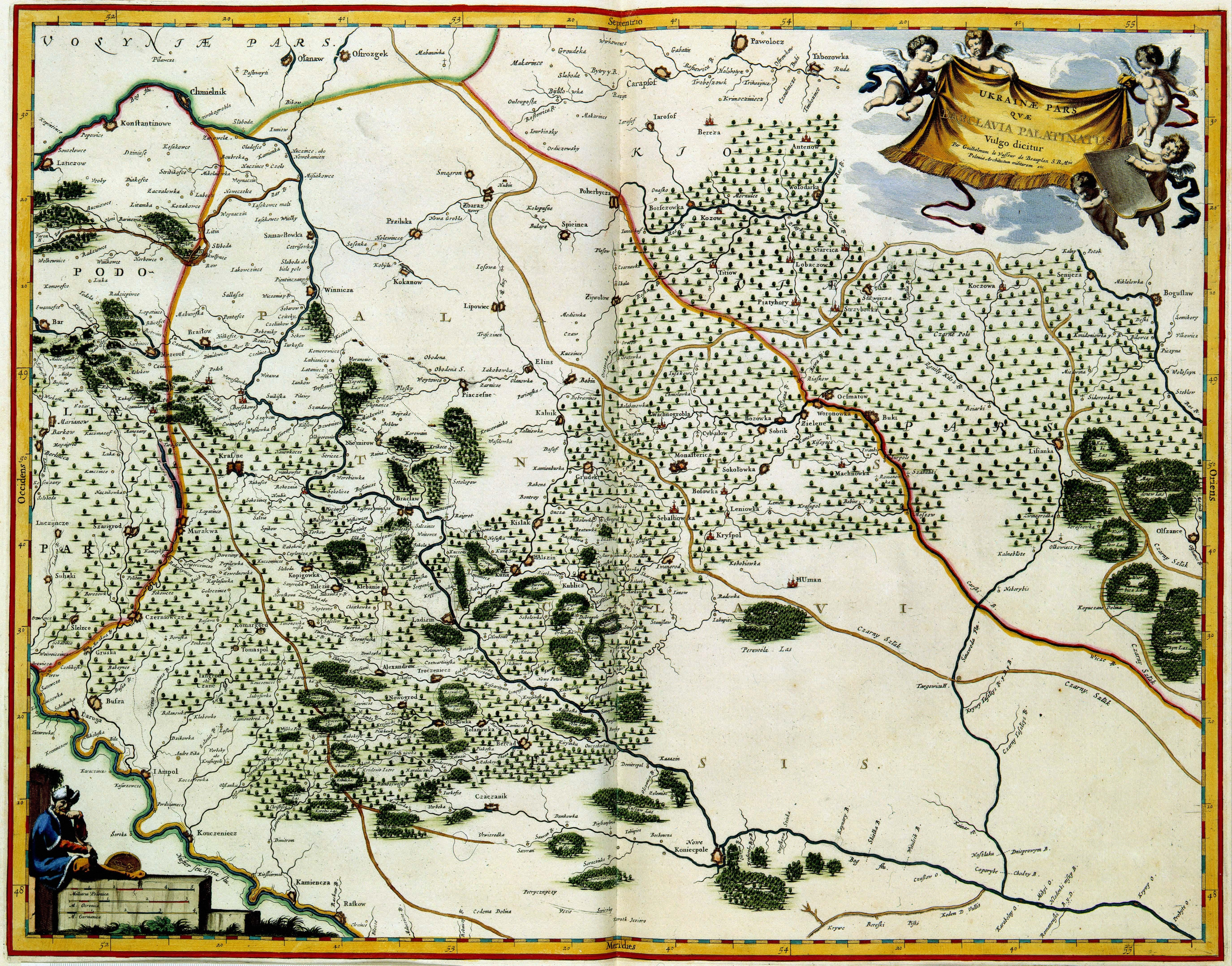
Map of the Bracław Voivodeship from 1648 with Lipowiec marked

Lipowiec, as it was known in Polish, was granted town rights in the early 17th century. It was a private town, administratively located in the Winnica County in the Bracław Voivodeship in the Lesser Poland Province of the Kingdom of Poland. It was annexed by the Russian Empire in the Second Partition of Poland in 1793. In 1802, it became the administrative center of Lypovets uyezd in Kiev Governorate. In the late 19th century the population was mostly employed in agriculture and grain trade, which was sold mostly to Odesa.

During World War II, Lypovets was the site of a battle between the Soviet Union and the Slovak State. The battle ended with a Slovak victory, with a cumulative casualty count of nearly 700. Afterwards it was occupied by Nazi German troops, from 1941 to 1944. In a field near Lypovets, from the end of April 1942, over 950 Jews were shot by German security forces with the support of local policemen and buried in two mass graves. To commemorate the extermination, obelisks were erected in the 1950s - on the initiative of Leontii Usharenko, who was pulled out of the pit at the last minute and had to watch his family and acquaintances being murdered. Two memorials were erected at the mass graves of the Jewish victims in 2019 and ceremonially inaugurated in September 2019.

== Population ==
=== Language ===
Distribution of the population by native language according to the 2001 census:

Language	Percentage
Ukrainian	98.41%
Russian	1.4%
other/undecided	0.19%

Historical population
Year	Pop.	±%
1875	6,710	—
1989	9,764	+45.5%
2013	8,727	−10.6%
2022	7,958	−8.8%

== Gallery ==
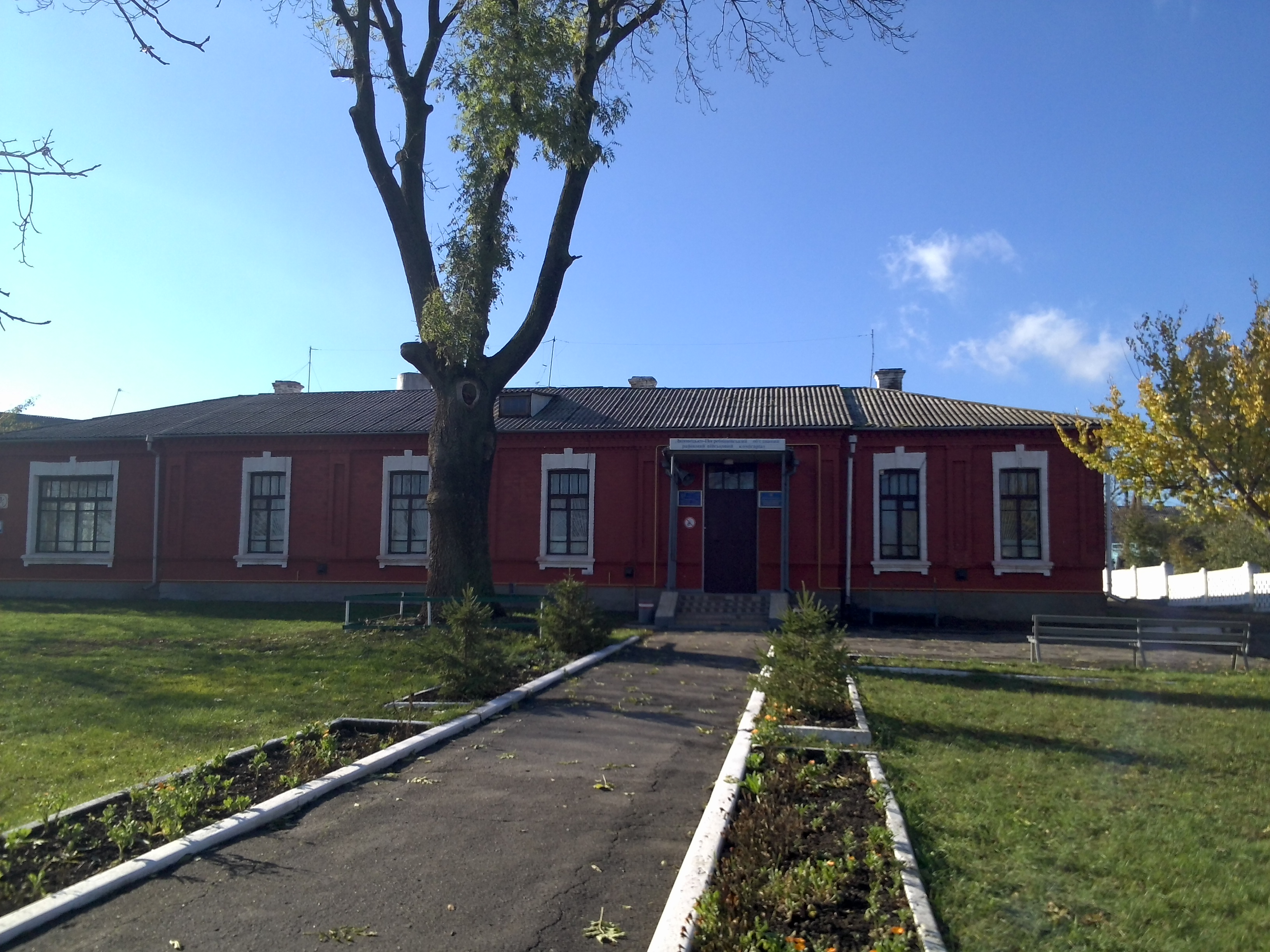
Lypovets district executive committee

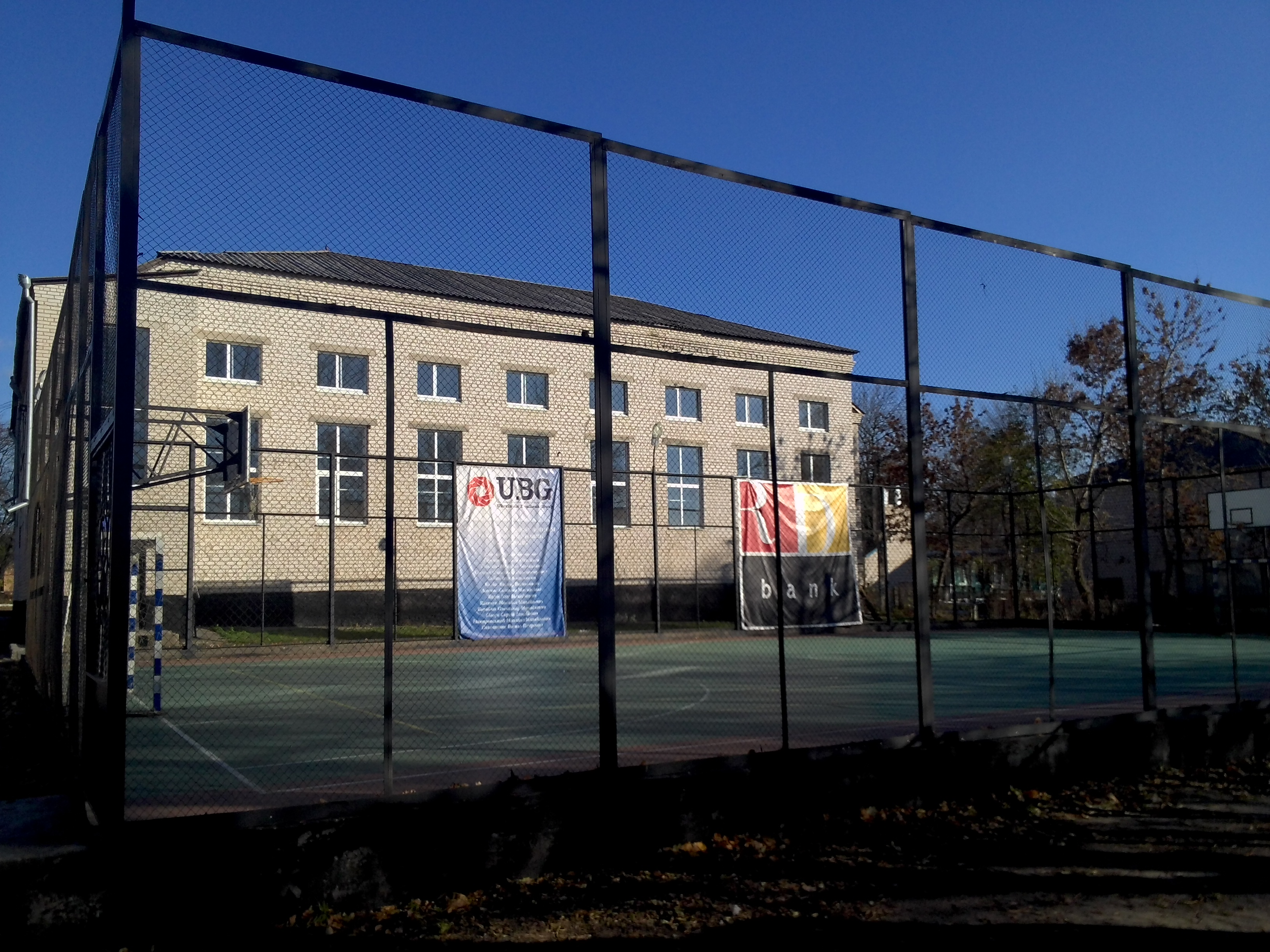
Sports ground

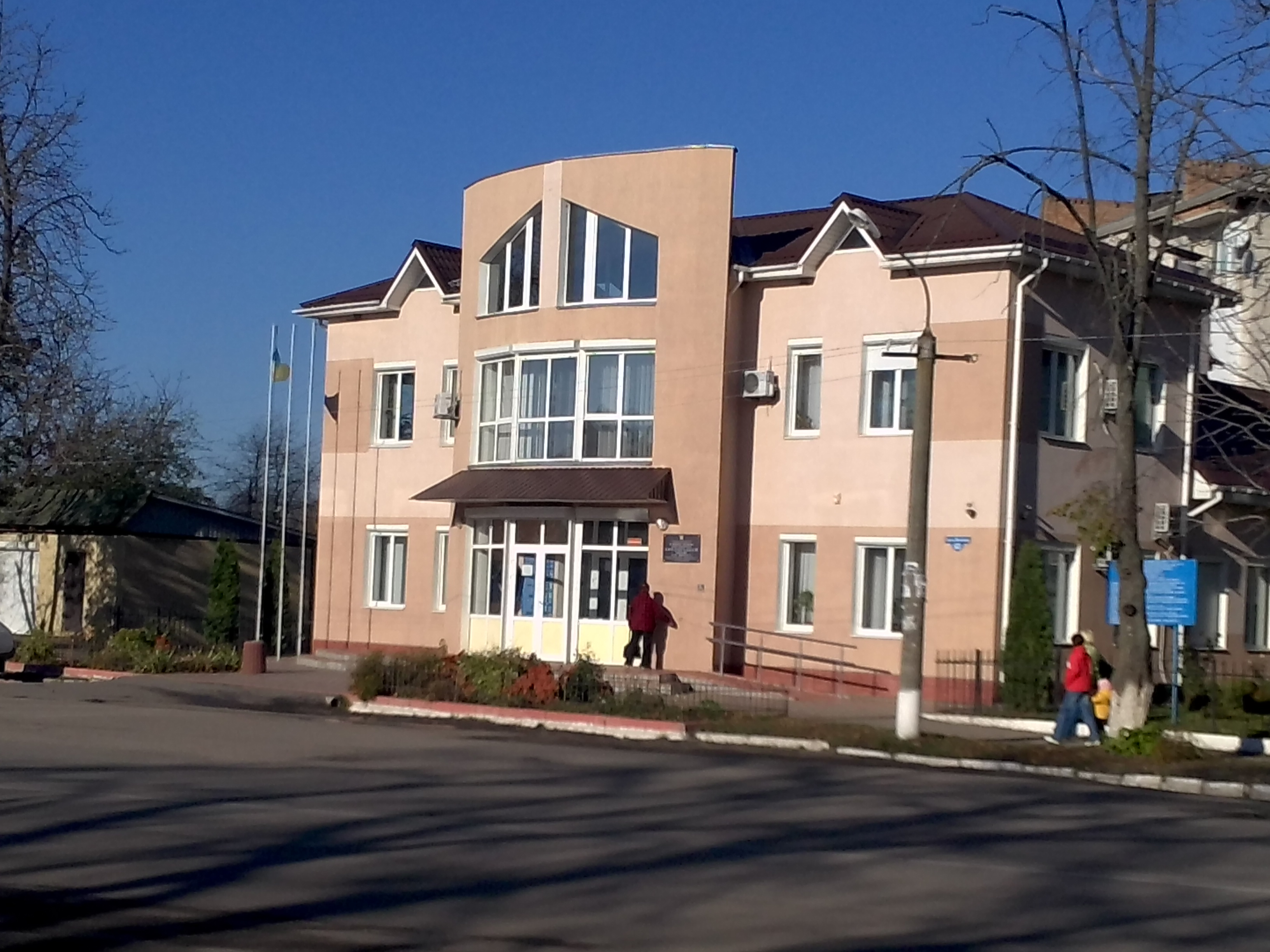
Employment centre in Lypovets

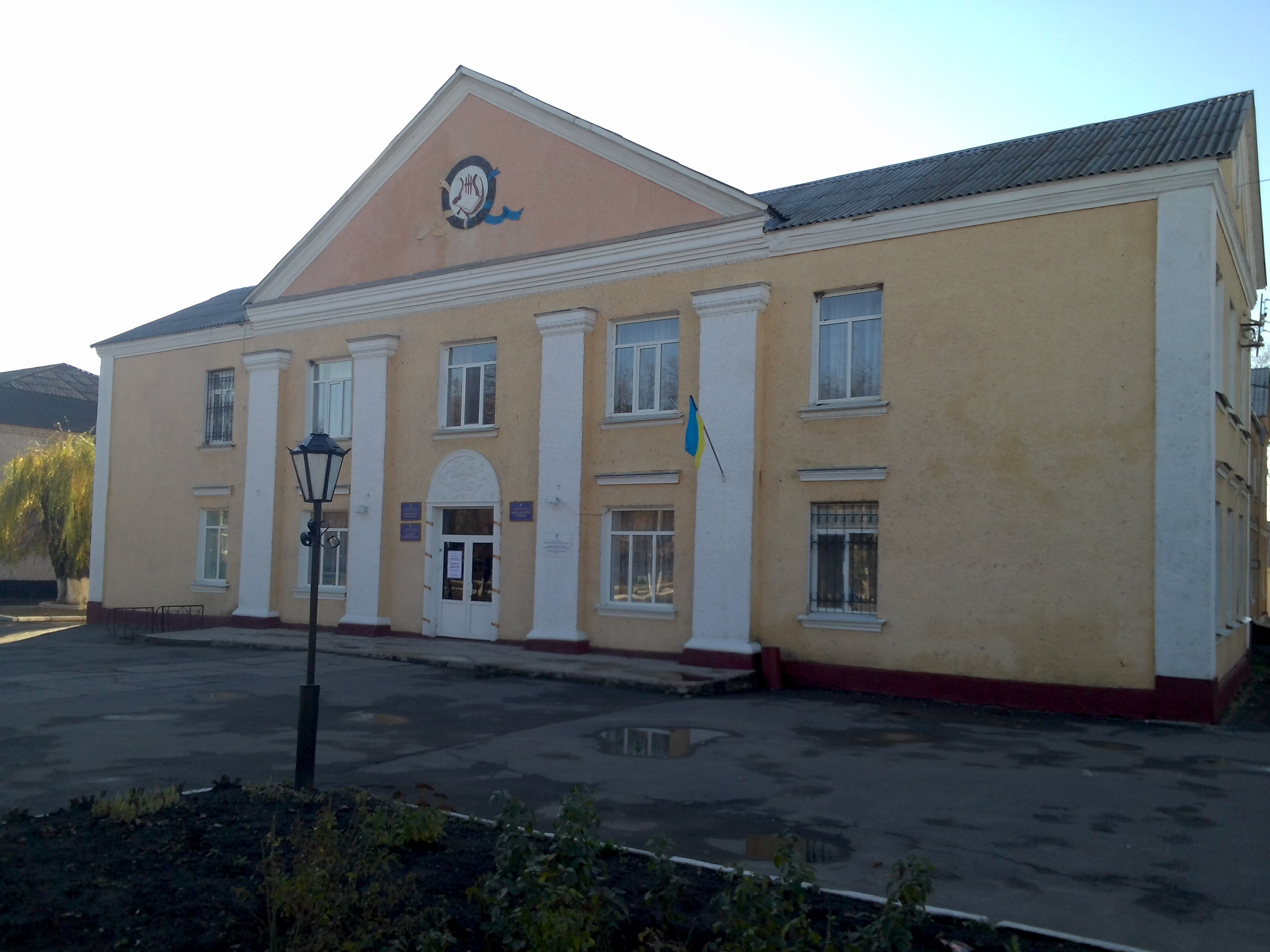
Palace of culture

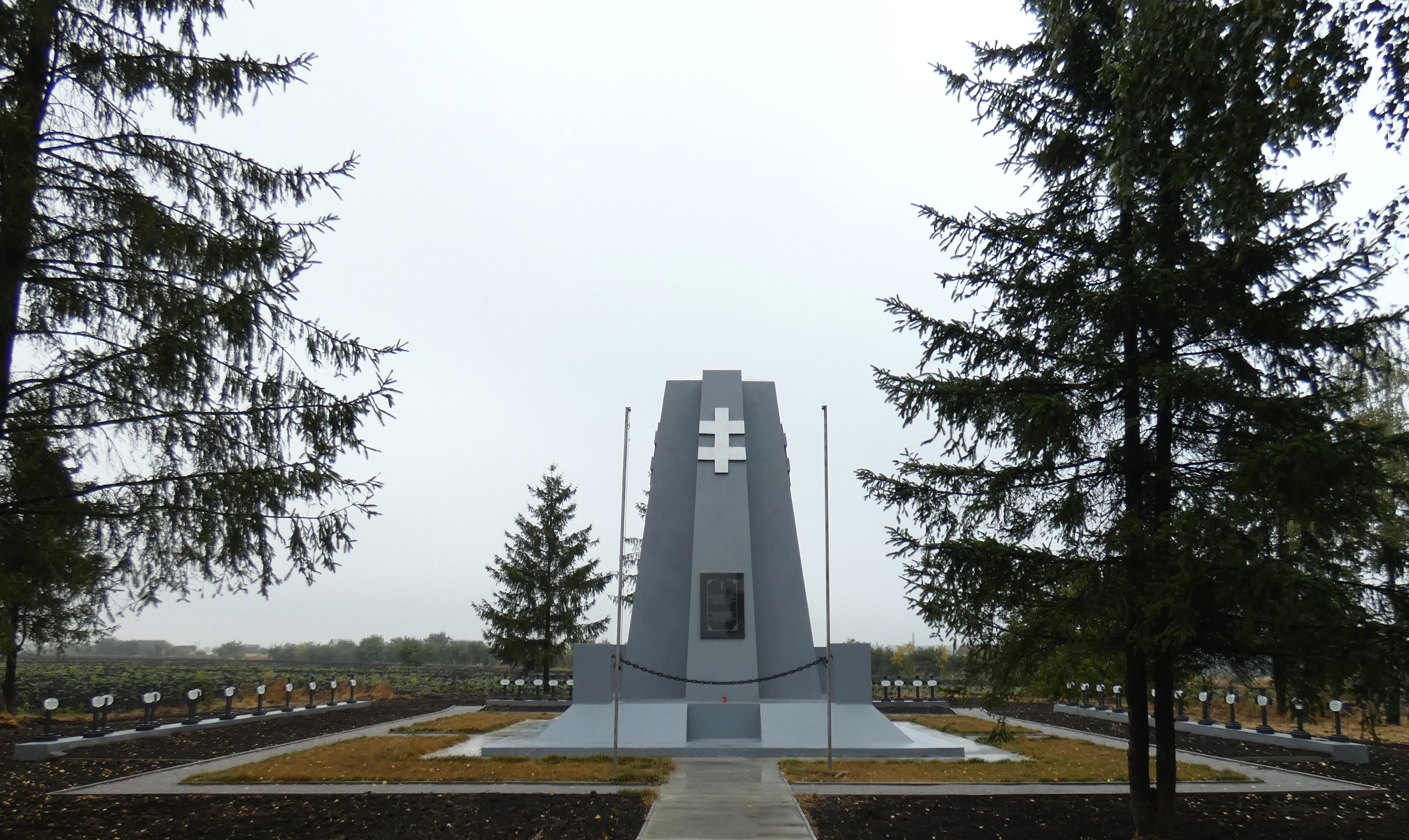
The Slovak Monument to commemorate the battle of 1941

== Notable people ==
- Pyotr Stolyarsky (1871 – 1944), Soviet violinist and pedagogue
