= Vinnytsia Raion =

Subdivision of Vinnytsia Oblast, Ukraine

Vinnytsia Raion Вінницький район
- Raion
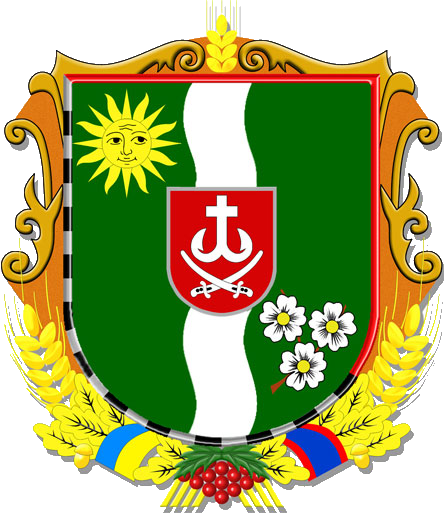
- Flag Coat of arms

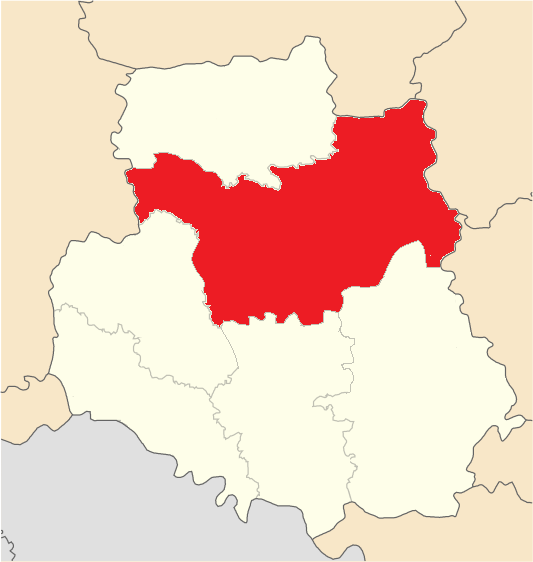
- Coordinates: 49°18′9″N 28°30′43.941″E
- Country: Ukraine
- Oblast: Vinnytsia Oblast
- Established: 1923
- Admin. center: Vinnytsia
- Subdivisions: 16 hromadas

Area
  - Total: 6,888.9 km^{2} (2,659.8 sq mi)

Population (2022)
  - Total: 647,966
  - Density: 94.059/km^{2} (243.61/sq mi)
- Time zone: UTC+02:00 (EET)
  - Summer (DST): UTC+03:00 (EEST)
- Postal index: 23201—23261
- Area code: +380 432
- Website: http://vinrajrada.org.ua

Vinnytsia Raion (Ukrainian: Вінницький район) is one of the six raions (districts) of Vinnytsia Oblast, located in southwestern Ukraine. The administrative center of the raion is the city of Vinnytsia. Population: 647,966 (2022 estimate).

On 18 July 2020, as part of the administrative reform of Ukraine, the number of raions of Vinnytsia Oblast was reduced to six, and the area of Vinnytsia Raion was significantly expanded. The January 2020 estimate of the raion population was 81,278 (2020 est.).

== Geography ==
Vinnytsia Raion it borders Zhytomyr, Kyiv and Khmelnytskyi regions of Ukraine. The area of the district is 6909.5 km^{2}. Vinnytsia Raion is located on the Podilska and Dnieper uplands. The relief of the district is an undulating plain, cut by river valleys, ravines, and gullies.

The climate is moderately continental. Winter is cool, summer is not hot. The average temperature in July is +20 °C, in January −5 °C. The maximum precipitation falls in the summer in the form of rain. The average annual amount is from 520 to 590 mm, changing from west to east.

Vinnytsia Raion is located in the basins of the Southern Bug river. The river in the floodplain has many oxbow lakes and artificial lakes.

Vinnytsia Raion is located in the forest-steppe natural zone. Among the trees in the forests, oaks and hornbeam dominate. Typical large mammals are elk, roe deer, wild boar, squirrels, beavers, hares and wolves. The soils are mostly lalfisol and typical chernozem.

Vinnytsia Raion has reserves of kaolinite, brown coal, granite, graphite.

== Communities of the district ==
Number of settlements 411. Number of cities – 7. Vinnytsia Raion includes 16 territorial communities. It includes: urban - Vinnytsia, Hnivan, Illine, Lypovetska, Nemyrivska, Pohrebyschenska; village - Voronovitska, Litynska, Orativska, Stryzhavska, Sutyskivska, Tyvrivska, Turbivska, rural - Agronomichna, Luka-Meleshkivska, Yakushynetska territorial communities.

== Transport ==
Vinnytsia district is crossed by railways and highways. The largest transport hub is Vinnytsia, through which roads pass in the direction of Zhytomyr, Lviv, Dnipro. The district is crossed by Haisyn European route E583.

== Bibliography ==
- Національний атлас України/НАН України, Інститут географії, Державна служба геодезії, картографії та кадастру; голов. ред. Л. Г. Руденко; голова ред. кол.Б.Є. Патон. — К.: ДНВП «Картографія», 2007. — 435 с. — 5 тис.прим. — ISBN 978-966-475-067-4.
- Географічна енциклопедія України : [у 3 т.] / редкол.: О. М. Маринич (відповід. ред.) та ін. — К., 1989—1993. — 33 000 екз. — ISBN 5-88500-015-8.
