= Tsvilikhivka =

Village in Vinnytsia Oblast, Ukraine

Tsvilikhivka Цвіліхівка
- Village
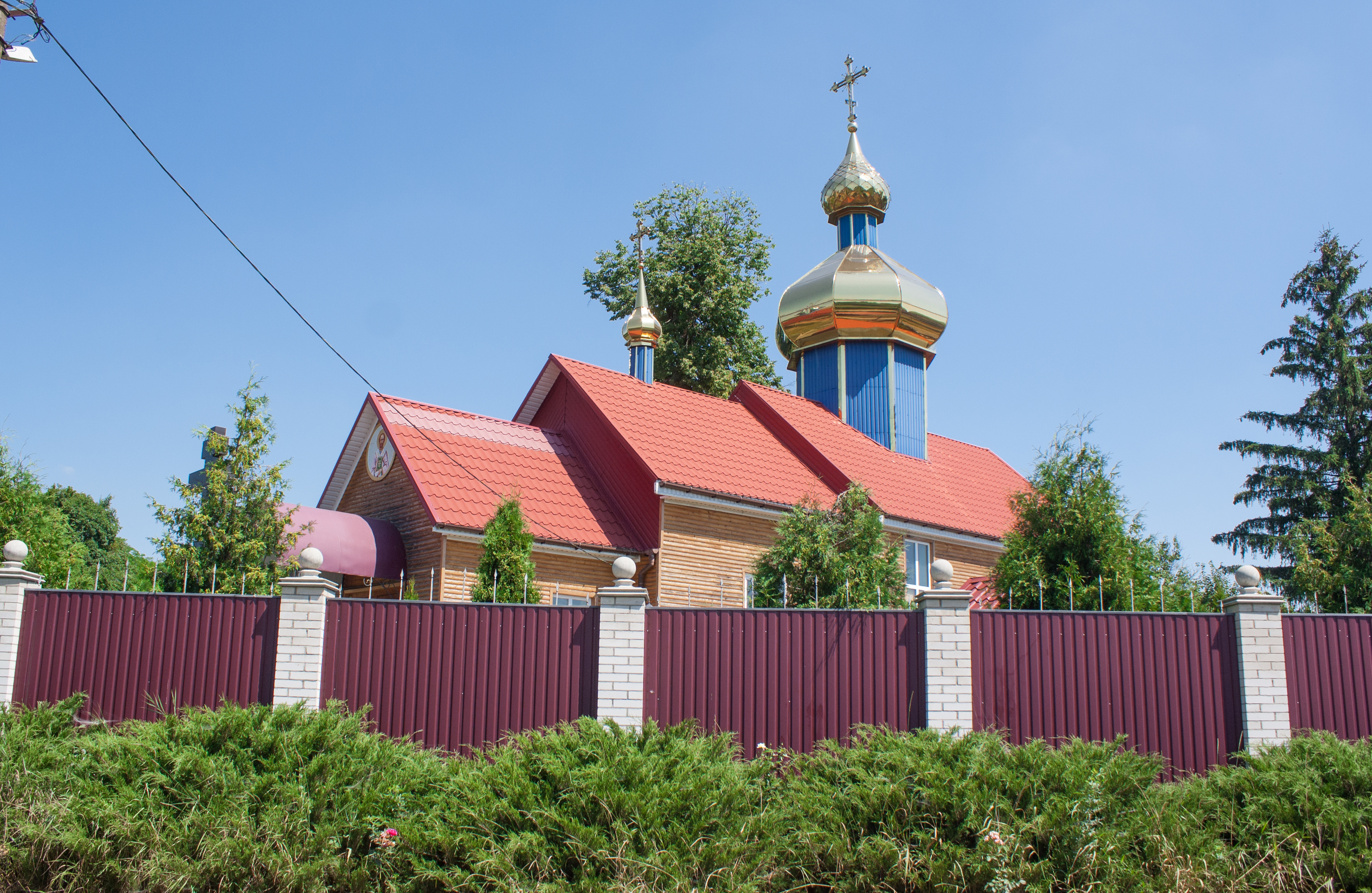
- Church of Tsvilikhivka

- Location of Tsvilikhivka Tsvilikhivka (Ukraine)
- Coordinates: 48°45′39″N 29°40′47″E
- Country: Ukraine
- Oblast: Vinnytsia Oblast
- Raion: Haisyn Raion
- Hromada: Krasnopil rural hromada
- Founded: 1750

Area
  - Total: 0.135 km^{2} (0.052 sq mi)
- Elevation: 227 m (745 ft)

Population (2017)
  - Total: 216
  - Density: 1,600/km^{2} (4,140/sq mi)
- Postal codes: 23810, 23829
- Area code: +380 4353

Tsvilikhivka (Ukrainian: Цвіліхівка) (Russian: Цвилиховка) is a village in the Krasnopil rural hromada, Haisyn Raion, Vinnytsia Oblast, Ukraine. It is located along both banks of the Kholyava River, a third level tributary of the Southern Bug. The village is 15 km north of Teplyk.

== History ==
Tsvilikhivka's etymology possibly derives from the German surname "Zwillich" and literally means "Zwillich's place". Tsvilikhivka itself is the etymology of the surname "Tsvilikhovsky" and other variants.

The settlement was part of the Bratslav Voivodeship under the Grand Duchy of Lithuania, but came under Russian control following the Second Partition of Poland.

Preceding the imminent invasion of the village as part of Operation Barbarossa, many residents of the village evacuated to Eastern Ukraine and the Interior of the Soviet Union.

In 2011, Ukrainian Police arrested a pensioner for growing hundreds of marijuana and poppy plants in her backyard, claiming that she had been conspiring to distribute opioids and marijuana, both of which are strictly illegal.

The village was formerly part of the Teplyk Raion, but became part of the Haisyn Raion during the 2020 administrative reform of Ukraine.

== Jewish settlement ==
Tsvilikhovka was among many villages surrounding Haisyn and Hraniv that became home to many Jewish residents in the area, including those who worked as merchants and in the hospitality industry. The 1875 military draft census for Ukraine shows Jews present in the village, as well as the greater Hraniv area.

== Religion ==
On October 10, 2013, His Holiness Patriarch Filaret consecrated the village's church in honor of the Holy Apostle and Evangelist John the Theologian.

== Gallery ==
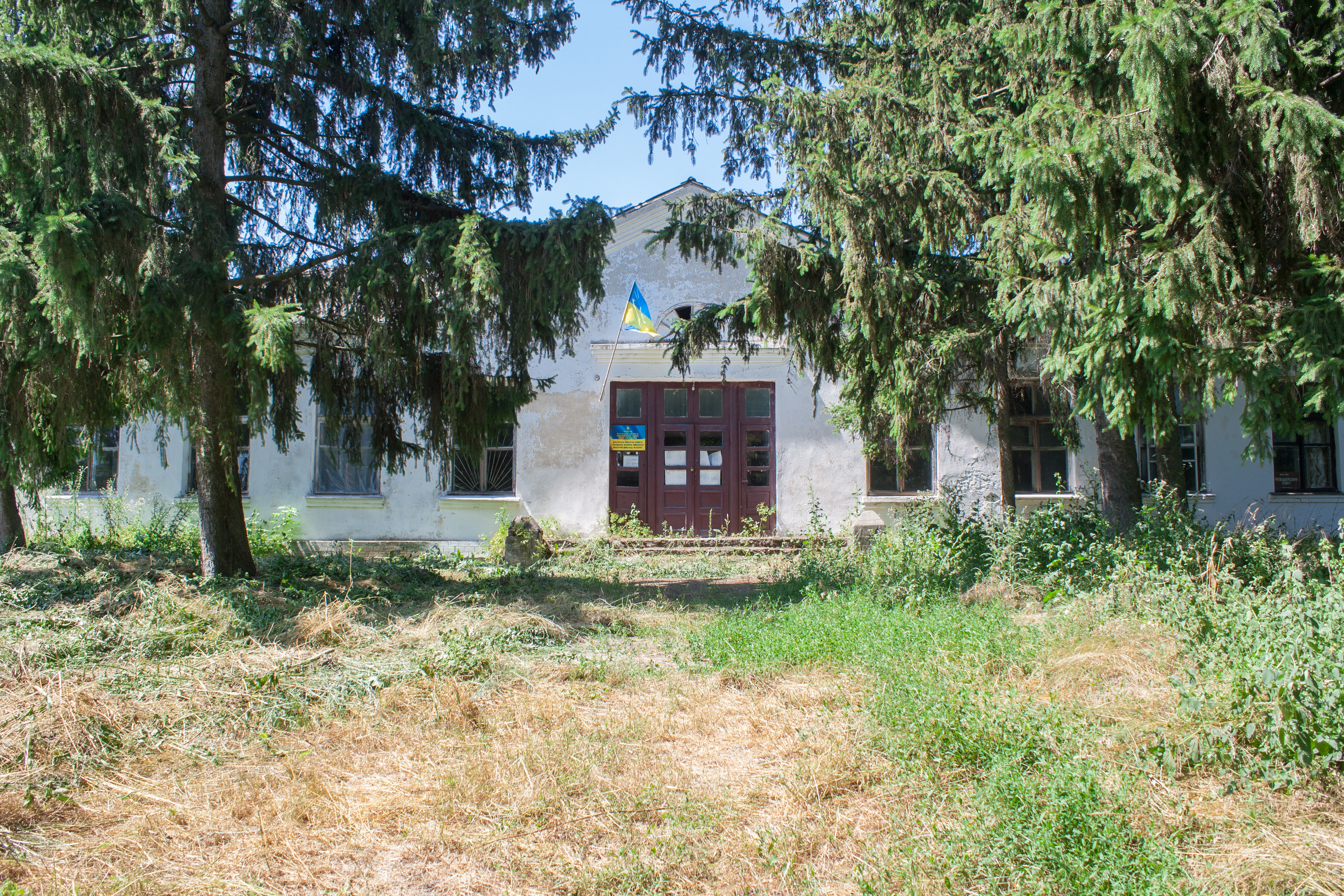
House of culture

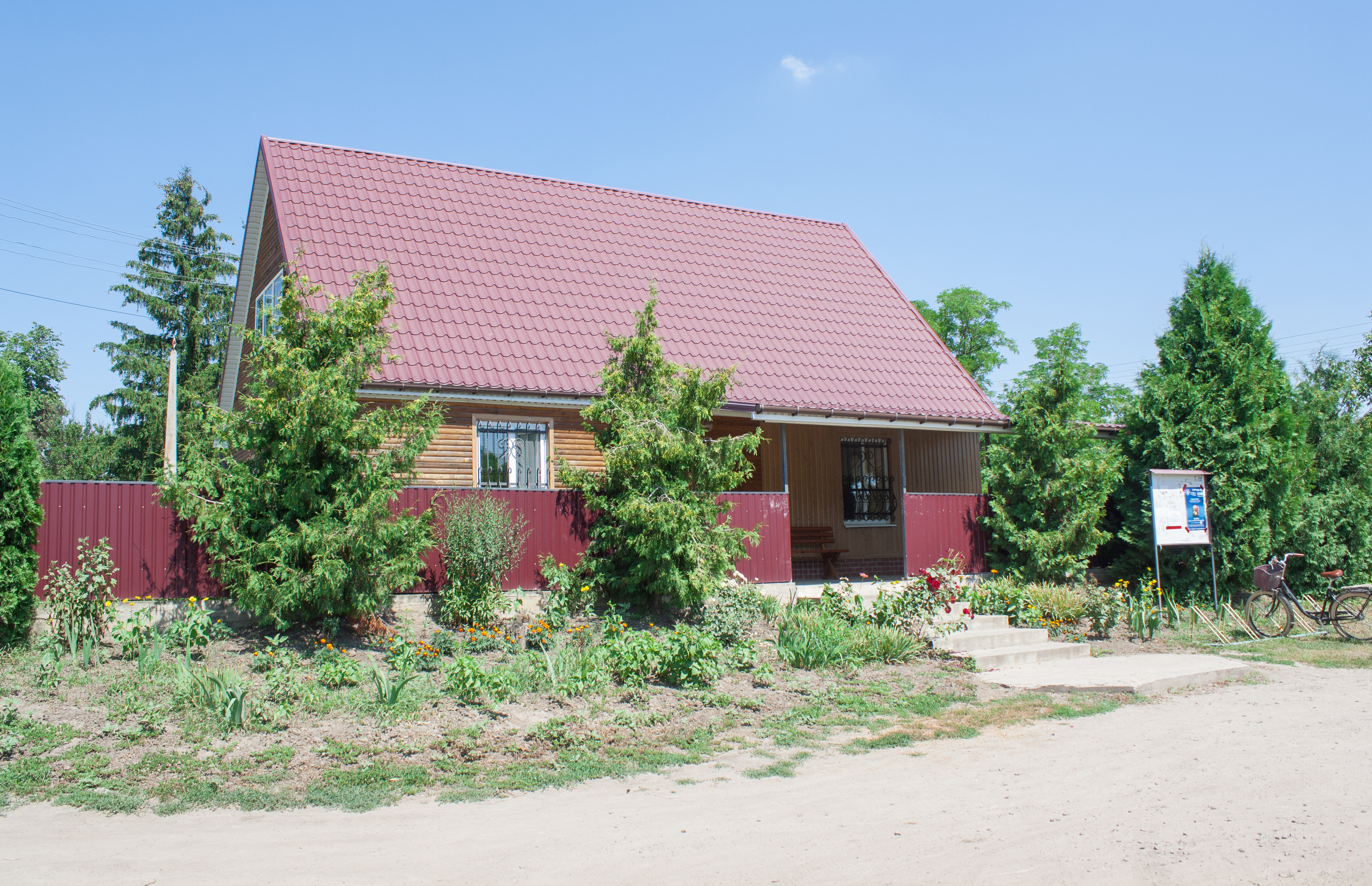
Local store

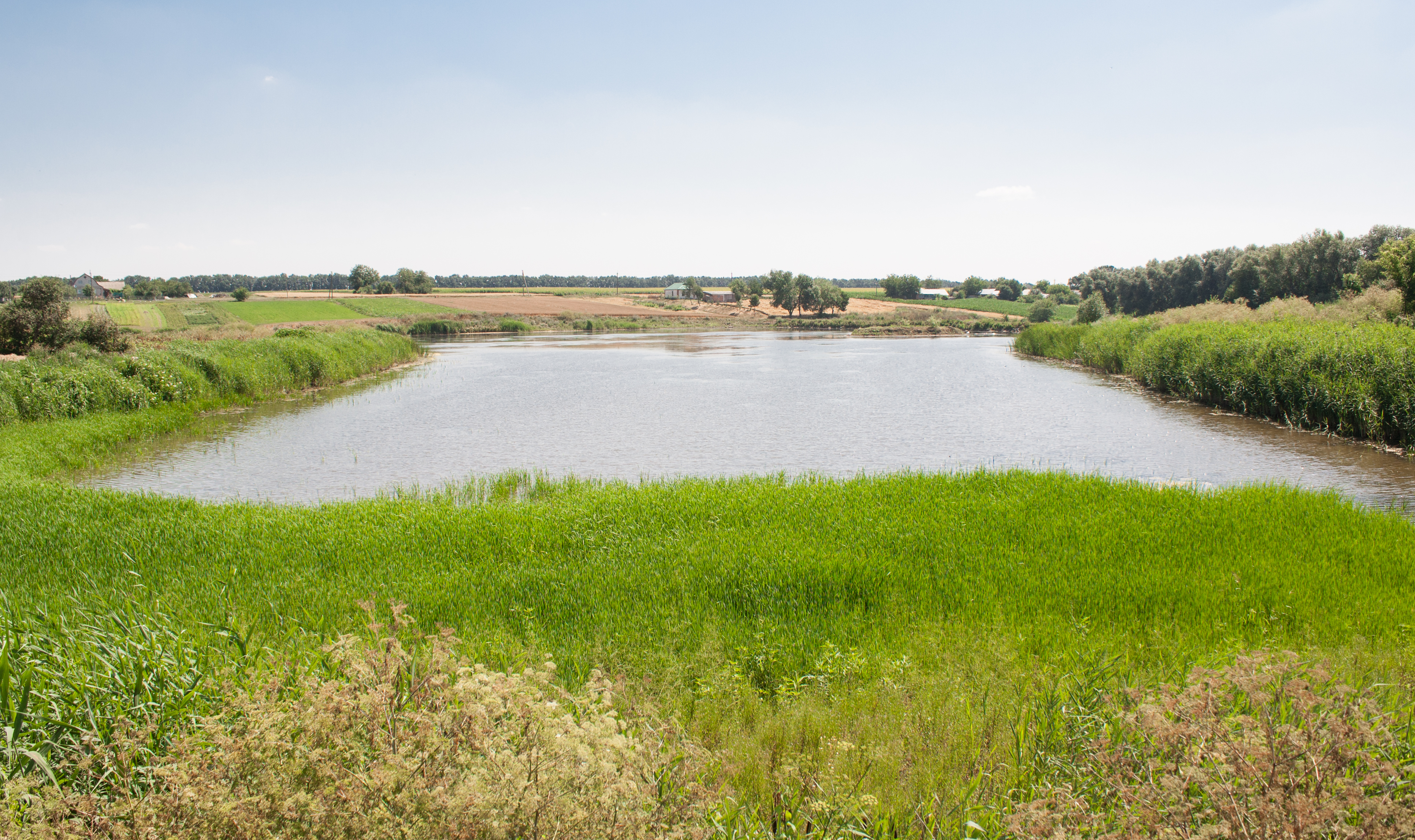
Pond

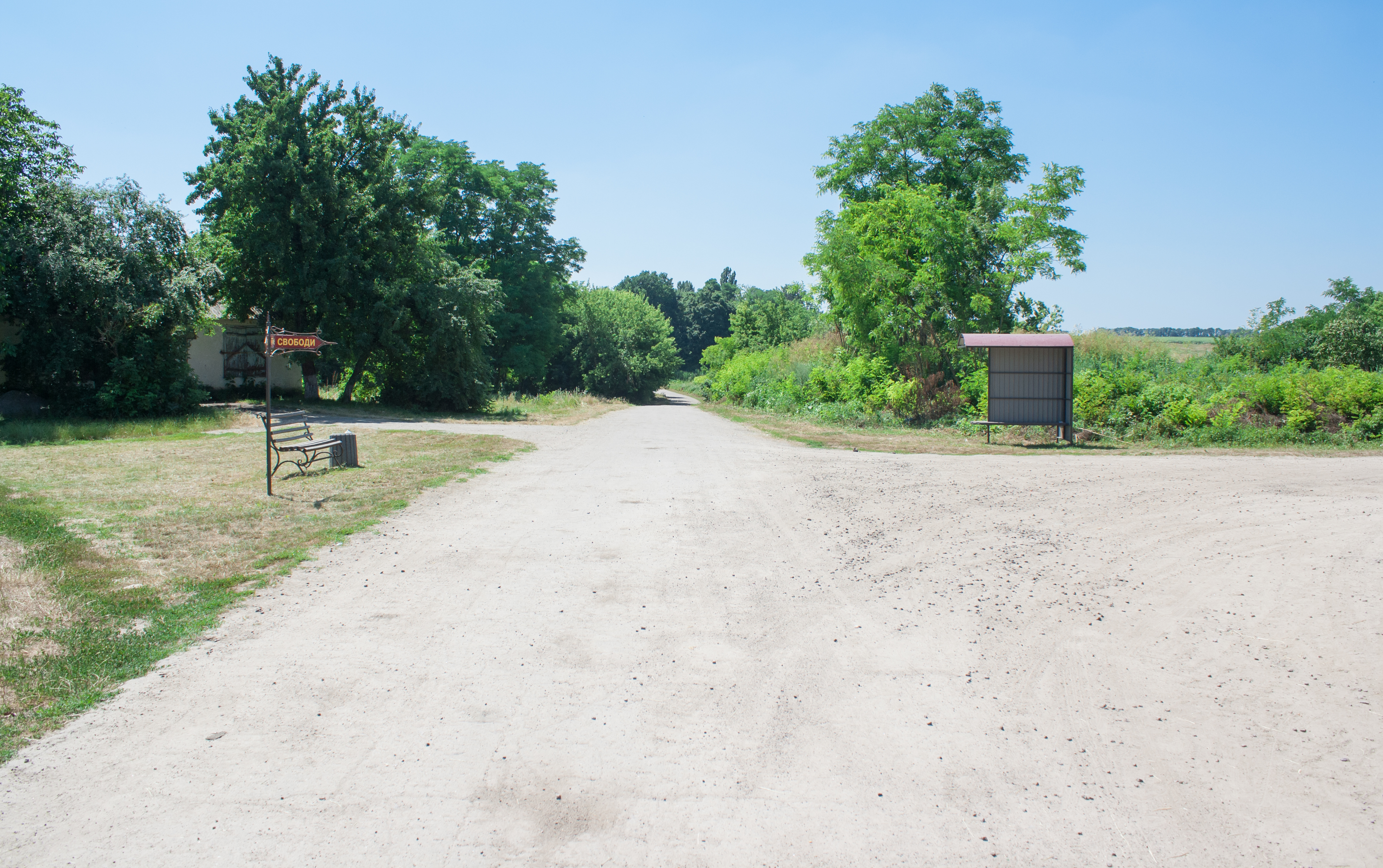
Village center

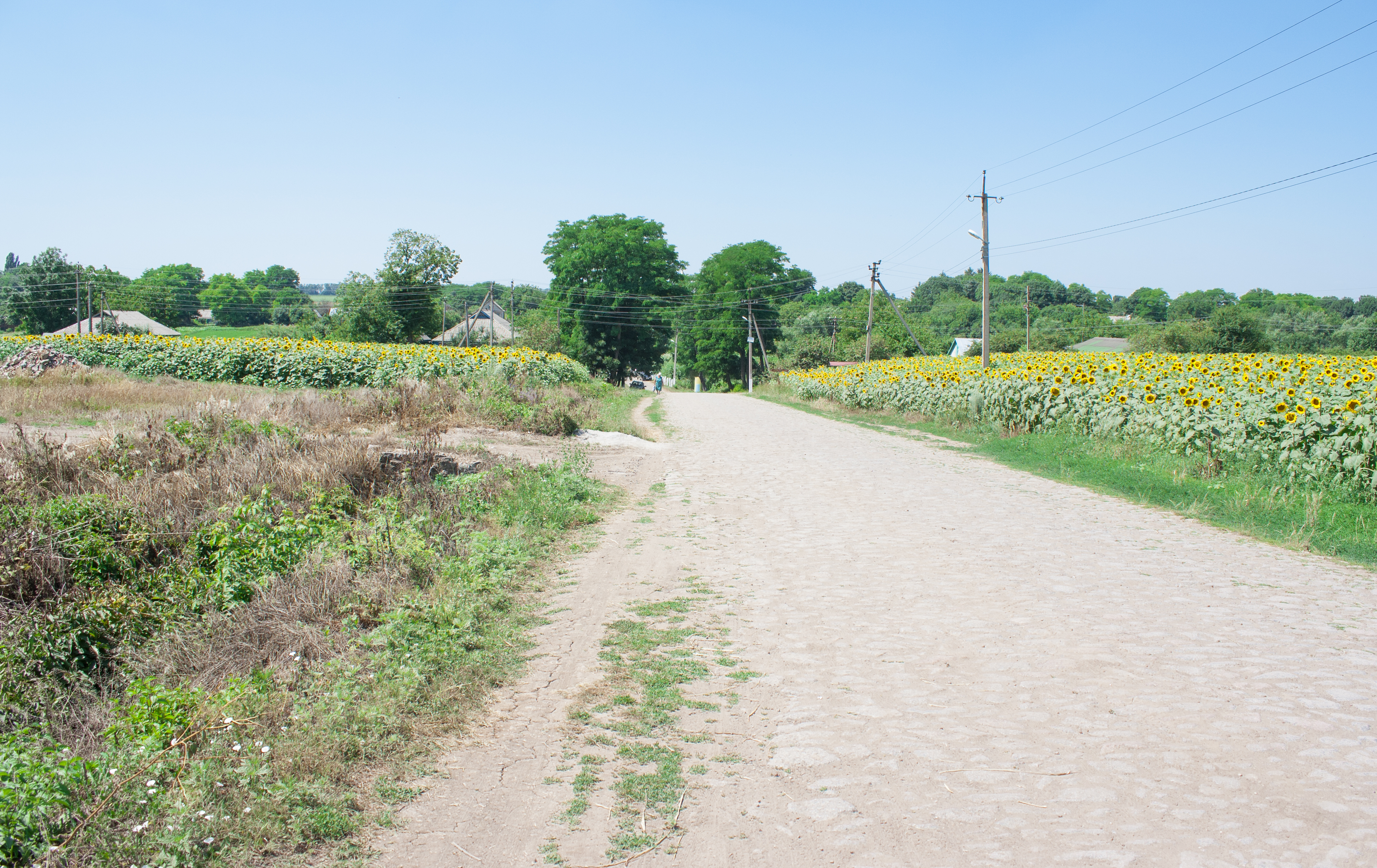
Entrance to village
