= Sobolivka =

Sobolivka may refer to various places in Ukraine:

- Sobolivka, Haisyn Raion, Vinnytsia Oblast, Vinnytsia Oblast, Haisyn Raion
- Sobolivka, Zhytomyr Oblast, Brusylivskyi Raion

On territory of Ukraine there are 11 settlements with the name of Sobolivka: Kharkiv Oblast (Kupiansk Raion), Cherkasy Oblast (Zvenyhorodka Raion), Kyiv Oblast (Brovary Raion and Bucha Raion), Zhytomyr Oblast (Dzerzhinskiy Raion, Brusyliv Raion and Korosten Raion), Vinnytsia Oblast (Vinnytsia Raion and Haisyn Raion), Odesa Oblast (Podilsk Raion), and Khmelnytskyi Oblast (Khmelnytskyi Raion).
