= Agranov =

Agranov (Russian: Агранов; masculine) or Agranova (Агранова; feminine) is a Russian last name. It derives from the Russian first name Gran (from the Latin word meaning grain), which transformed into the last name Granov. That last name transformed into "Agranov", as the latter is easier to pronounce.

People with the last name

- David Agranov, actor who played Paul McNerney in Just Married, a 2003 American romantic comedy
- Yakov Agranov (1893–1938), first Chief of the Soviet Main Directorate of State Security and a deputy NKVD chief

Fictional characters

- Osip Agranov, character from the American crime drama series True Detective
