= Tetiana Yakovenko =

Ukrainian poet, literary critic, and teacher

Tetiana Vasylivna Yakovenko Тетяна Василівна Яковенко
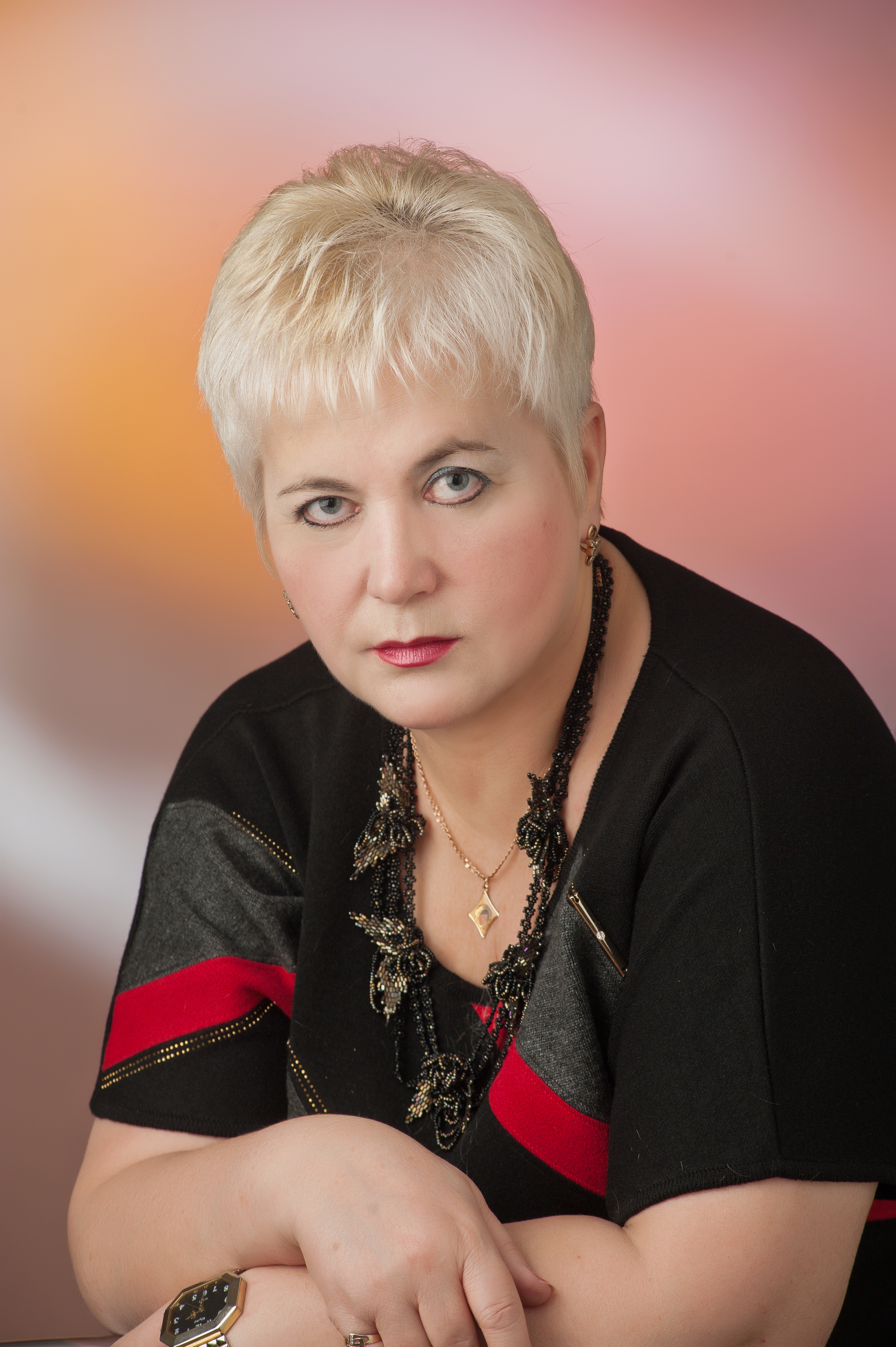
- Born: May 16, 1954 (age 72); Sobolivka, Teplyk Raion, Vinnytsia Oblast, Ukraine
- Education: Vinnytsia State Pedagogical University; Taras Shevchenko National University of Kyiv
- Occupations: poet; literary critic; teacher
- Writing career
- Notable awards: Honored Worker of Ukraine Culture

Tetiana Vasylivna Yakovenko (Ukrainian: Тетяна Василівна Яковенко; born, May 16, 1954) is a Ukrainian poet, literary critic, and teacher. Since 1988, she has been a member of the National Writers' Union of Ukraine. Her awards include Honored Worker of Ukraine Culture (2004), and Excellent Education of Ukraine (1992).

== Biography ==
Tetiana Yakovenko was born in the village of Sobolivka, Teplyk Raion, Vinnytsia Oblast, Ukraine, on May 16, 1954. After graduating from Sobol Secondary School, she worked at a local sugar factory, taught at schools in the Teplyk Raion, and worked for the Komsomol. She graduated from Vinnytsia State Pedagogical University (VSPU) (1977), and did postgraduate studies at the Institute of Literature, Taras Shevchenko National University of Kyiv as a Candidate of Sciences, Philology (1987).

From 1983 to 2012, Yakovenko was an Associate Professor of Ukrainian literature at the Institute of Philology and Journalism, VSPU. Her research interests include the history of Ukrainian literature, translation studies, and comparative studies.

Yakovenko was elected a deputy of the Vinnytsia Oblast Council, 5th convocation, and chair of the standing commission on education, culture, and spiritual revival. She is also a member of the Presidium of the Vinnytsia Oblast Council. For more than ten years, she managed the regional children's literary and art studio "Network". From 1999 to 2012, she served as head of the literary and artistic studio, "Sails", at VSPU. Since 2012, she has been the head of the literary and artistic studio "Slovotsvit" at Vinnytsia Humanitarian and Pedagogical College. She was a member of the National Writers' Union of Ukraine Admissions Committee for more than ten years. She is the chair of the Vinnytsia Regional Local History Literary and Artistic Public Organization "Velyka Rodnya".

The first poem of the nine-year-old Yakovenko was published in 1963 in the Soviet newspaper for children and youth Зірка (Star). Thereafter, she has authored about twenty books of poetry, hundreds of publications in periodicals, several dozen prefaces to the first books of young authors of Vinnytsia Oblast, and served as a compiler of some regional literary almanacs, including several issues of Подільського перевесла (Podolsky oar).

Yakovenko is the author of dozens of scientific papers and manuals in the field of Ukrainian and world literature, and literary local lore. In particular, she studied the works of Yuriy Klen, Leonid Mosendz, Mykhailo Stelmakh, Nikolay Nekrasov, Matsuo Bashō, Rudyard Kipling, and others, as well as the philological aspects of Scripture. Her chants of biblical books were published in journal periodicals, including The Book of the Prophet Zephaniah (2008), The Book of Ruth (2008), The Book of the Prophet Jonah (2008), and others. Dozens of songs based on Yakovenko's poems have been written by Vinnytsia composers Oleksandr Pilchen, Leonid Hrushevsky, Olga Yanushkevych, Andriy Shinkovych, Natalia Todosienko, Yakov Polyakhivsky and Maksym Kolesnikov (Kazakhstan).

== Awards and honours ==
=== Honorary titles ===
- Knight of the Order of Princess Olga III degree (2013)
- Honored Worker of Ukraine Culture (2004)
- Honorary Award of the National Writers' Union of Ukraine (2004)
- Breastplate of the Ministry of Education and Science of Ukraine "Excellence in Education" (1992)
- "Person of the Year" in Vinnytsia Oblast in the category "Artist" (2010)

=== Literary awards ===
- Mykola Trublaini Literary Prize (1978)
- Crystal Cherry Literary and Artistic Prize (2001)
- All-Ukrainian Literary Prize named after Mykhailo Kotsyubynsky (2002)
- Literary Prize of the NSPU "Annunciation" (2003)
- Yevhen Gutsal All-Ukrainian Literary and Artistic Prize (2004)
- Mark Vovchko Literary and Artistic Prize (2007)
- Ivan Ogienko All-Ukrainian Prize (2008)
- Mykhailo Stelmakh Literary Prize of the Vinnytsia Region Magazine (2008)
- Ivan Koshelivets International Literary Prize (2008)
- Pavel Tychyna Literary Prize (2010)
- Anatoliy Bortnyak Literary Prize (2012)

== Selected works ==
=== Collections of poetry ===
- Conscience, 1986
- Daily Motherland, 1990
- Self-portrait with lilies of the valley, 1992
- Premonition of grass, 1993
- Colorful night, 1998
- Heavenly Garden, 2012
- For earthly happiness, 2017 (translated into Belarusian by Belarusian authors in Ukrainian)

=== Collections of lyrics ===
- Love for your face, 1987
- The temptation of confession, 2001
- And the gold of laughter, and the silver of tears, 2006
- Live fire, 2009

=== Collections of hymns from the Holy Scriptures ===
- Psalms to David, 2002
- The book of psalms in the songs of Tatiana Yakovenko, 2003
- Song over songs in the artistic chant of Tatiana Yakovenko, 2004
- Ecclesiastes ' book in the artistic chant of Tatiana Yakovenko, 2005
- The book of the prophet Daniel in the artistic chant of Tatiana Yakovenko 2008
- Hosanna to the Lord, Hosanna! : chants in the Ukrainian language of the Holy Scripture, 2013 (Series "Library of Literature of Vinnytsia")

=== Poetic tales for children ===
- The Tale of Julia the Bee, 2005. (Motherland shines in the heart of the daughter and son)
- The Tale of the Bear Brishka, 2005. (Motherland shines in the heart of the daughter and son)
- Sports in honor of animals, 2005. (Motherland shines in the heart of daughter and son)

=== Collections of works for children, co-authored with Olena Vitenko ===
- Podolsk pereveslechko : a collection of children's poems", 2011
- Harvester, 2012
