= Kytaihorod, Trostianets rural hromada =

Village in Haisyn Raion, Ukraine

Kytaihorod Китайгород
- Village
- Interactive map of Kytaihorod
- Location within Vinnytsia Oblast Location within Ukraine
- Coordinates: 48°29′12″N 29°00′31″E
- Country: Ukraine
- Oblast: Vinnytsia Oblast
- Raion: Haisyn Raion
- Hromada: Trostianets rural hromada

Area
  - Total: 1.98 km^{2} (0.76 sq mi)
- Elevation: 205 m (673 ft)

Population
  - Total: 383
- Postal code: 24335
- Area code: 380 4343

Kytaihorod (Ukrainian: Китайгород) is a village in the Trostianets rural hromada, Haisyn Raion, Vinnytsia Oblast, Ukraine. It is located on a tributary of the Dniester River, and has a population of 383.

== History ==
The village was founded in 1686. According to historian Omeljan Pritsak, the etymology of the name Kytaihorod comes from the Polovtsy-Kumans.

On June 12, 2020, as order of the Cabinet of Ministers of Ukraine, the village became part of the Trostianets rural hromada.

On July 17, 2020, as a result of the territorial reform of Ukraine, the village became part of the Haisyn Raion from the now-abolished Trostianets Raion.

== Notable people ==
- Vasyl Grinchak, Ukrainian writer and translator
