= Horodok, Haisyn Raion =

Village in Vinnytsia Oblast, Ukraine

Horodok Городок
- Village
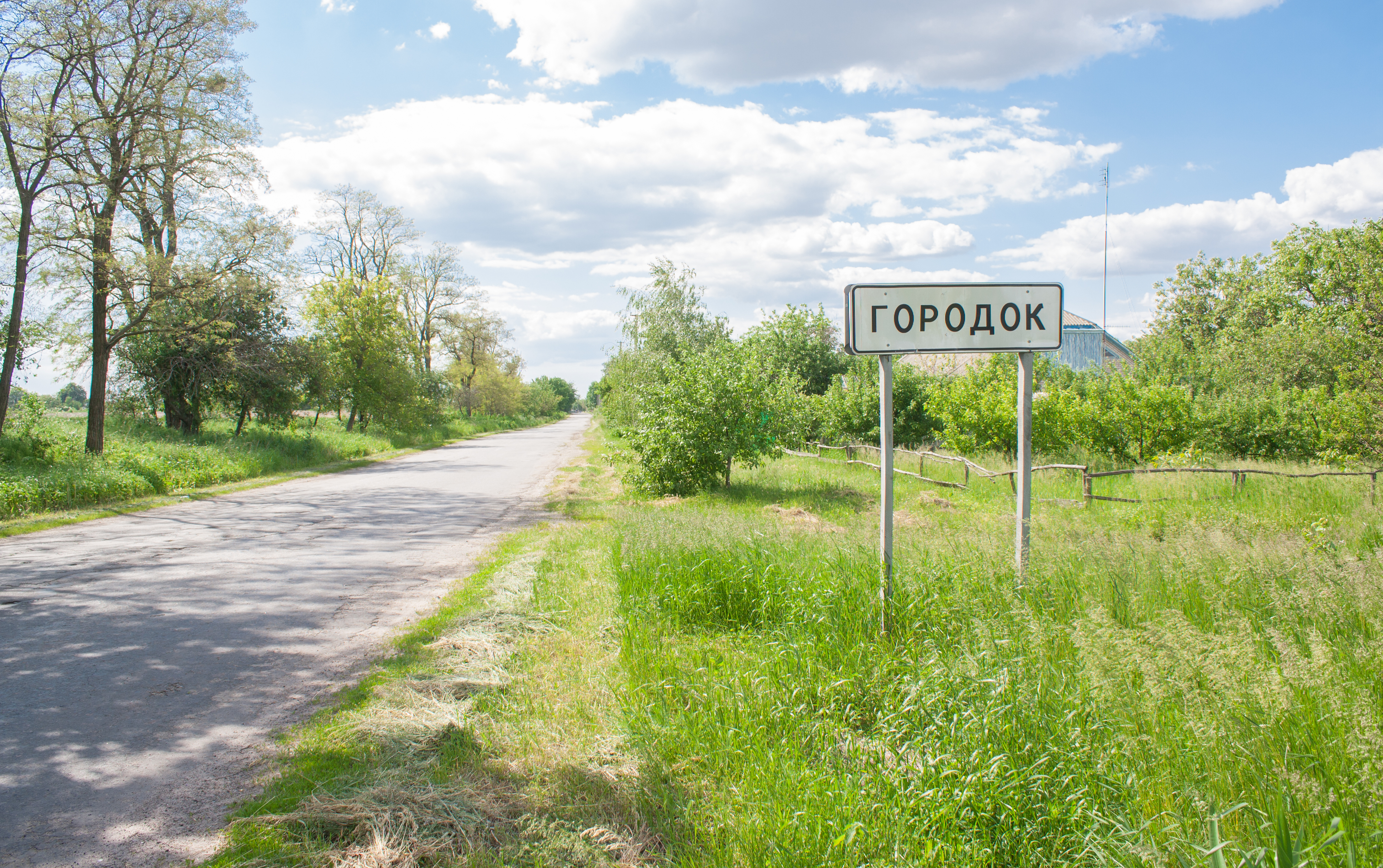
- Entrance to village

- Location of Horodok Horodok (Ukraine)
- Coordinates: 48°57′24″N 29°31′27″E
- Country: Ukraine
- Oblast: Vinnytsia Oblast
- Raion: Haisyn Raion
- Hromada: Dashiv settlement hromada
- Founded: 1612

Area
  - Total: 3.85 km^{2} (1.49 sq mi)
- Elevation: 200 m (660 ft)

Population (2018)
  - Total: 1,076
  - Density: 279/km^{2} (724/sq mi)
- Postal code: 22753
- Area code: +380 4345

Horodok (Ukrainian: Городок; Russian: Городо́к; Polish: Gródek) is a village in Dashiv settlement hromada, Haisyn Raion, Vinnytsia Oblast, in Ukraine. It lies on both banks of the Soroka River^{[uk]} (a tributary of the Sobu^{[uk]}), and is located 32 km southeast of the city of Illintsi. The population was 1,076 as of January 1, 2018.

== History ==
Initially, the settlement was called Grudek (Ukrainian: Грудек), and was founded between 1612 and 1625, then being part of the Granov volost^{[uk]}. It was founded by a nobleman from the Sieniawski family of the Leliwa coat of arms, who, at the time, was the owner of the land that comprised the Granivska volost. The town was originally founded around a castle surrounded by a moat and rampart. During the Ukrainian Uprising against Polish Nobility following the Cossack riots, General Maksym Kryvonis defeated Polish forces at Horodek.

By 1863, the population was over 2,000, the majority of which were Orthodox, with the rest mostly being Polish Catholics and Jews. Orthodox residents were mostly engaged in agriculture and low-level artisan positions.

The town's population peaked around 1910, with a total of 11,167 residents. The town's population had fallen by 1939 to 8,031 people, with 1/4th being Jewish. The town population in the 2010s is nearly 1/8th of its pre-WWII population.

On June 12, 2020, by order of the Cabinet of Ministers of Ukraine, "On the definition of administrative centers and approval of territories of territorial communities of Vinnytsia region", the village became part of the Dashivka city community. One month later, as a result of territorial reform in Ukraine, it was removed from the liquidated Illintsi Raion, and became part of the Haisyn Raion.

== Jews and the Holocaust ==
The town had a large Jewish population during the 18th, 19th, and 20th centuries, although settlement occurred as early as the 17th century, and continued to grow despite earlier pogroms. The town had a wooden synagogue that burned down in 1939.

The population of the village by the 1897 All-Russia census was nearly 8,600 people, 3,200 of whom were Jewish. Jews mostly resided in the center of the town, while many of the Polish residents resided in farms on the outskirts of the village.

The town was captured by German forces on July 8, 1941. A ghetto was formed shortly after to house the Jews of Horodok and nearby Kuzmyn. In the beginning of Autumn of 1941, several Jews were publicly tortured and hanged in the town square as an intimidation tactic. In October 1941, most of the Jews were brought to a military base near the Yarmolintsi railway station. Following an attempted uprising, the Jews were shot, along with the Jews of Frampol^{[uk]}, Mikhalpol^{[uk]}, and Satanov. The 1942-1943 winter season saw another 103 Jews shot and killed, including Jews who had hid during occupation. The village was liberated by Soviet forces on March 25, 1944.

In modern times, there is a Jewish cemetery atop a hill in the village with tombstones from up until the end of the 19th century.

== Gallery ==
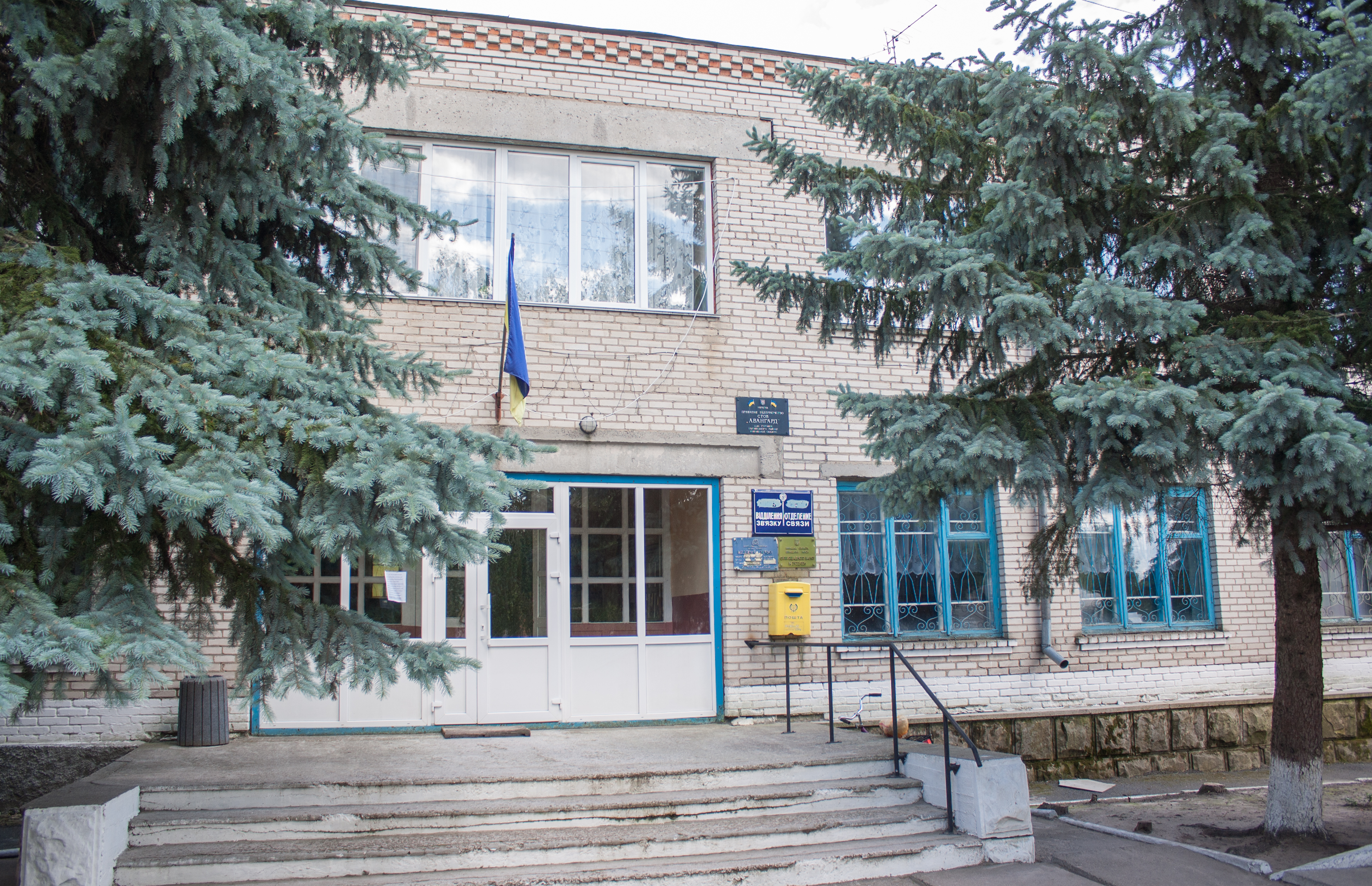
Village council

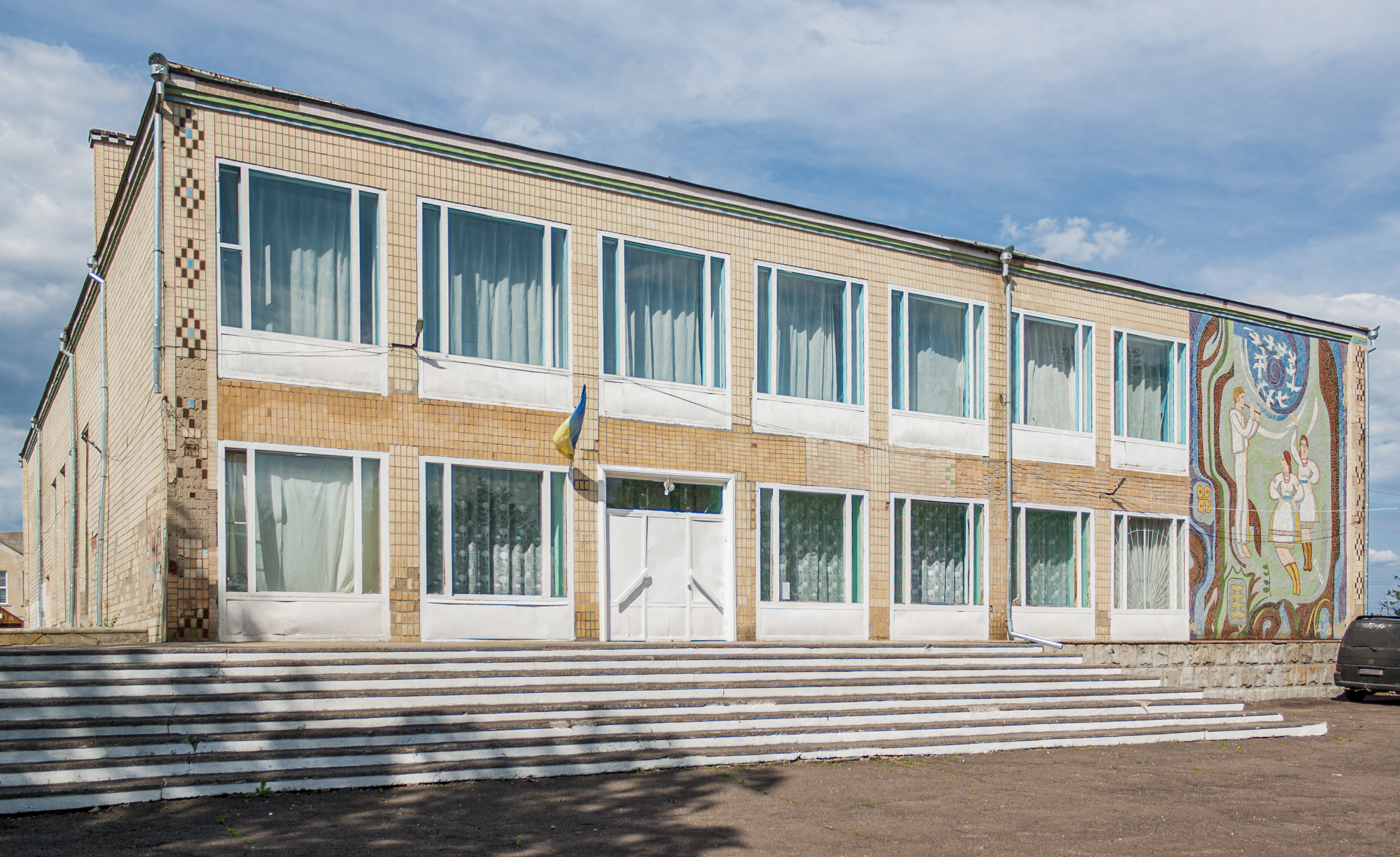
House of culture

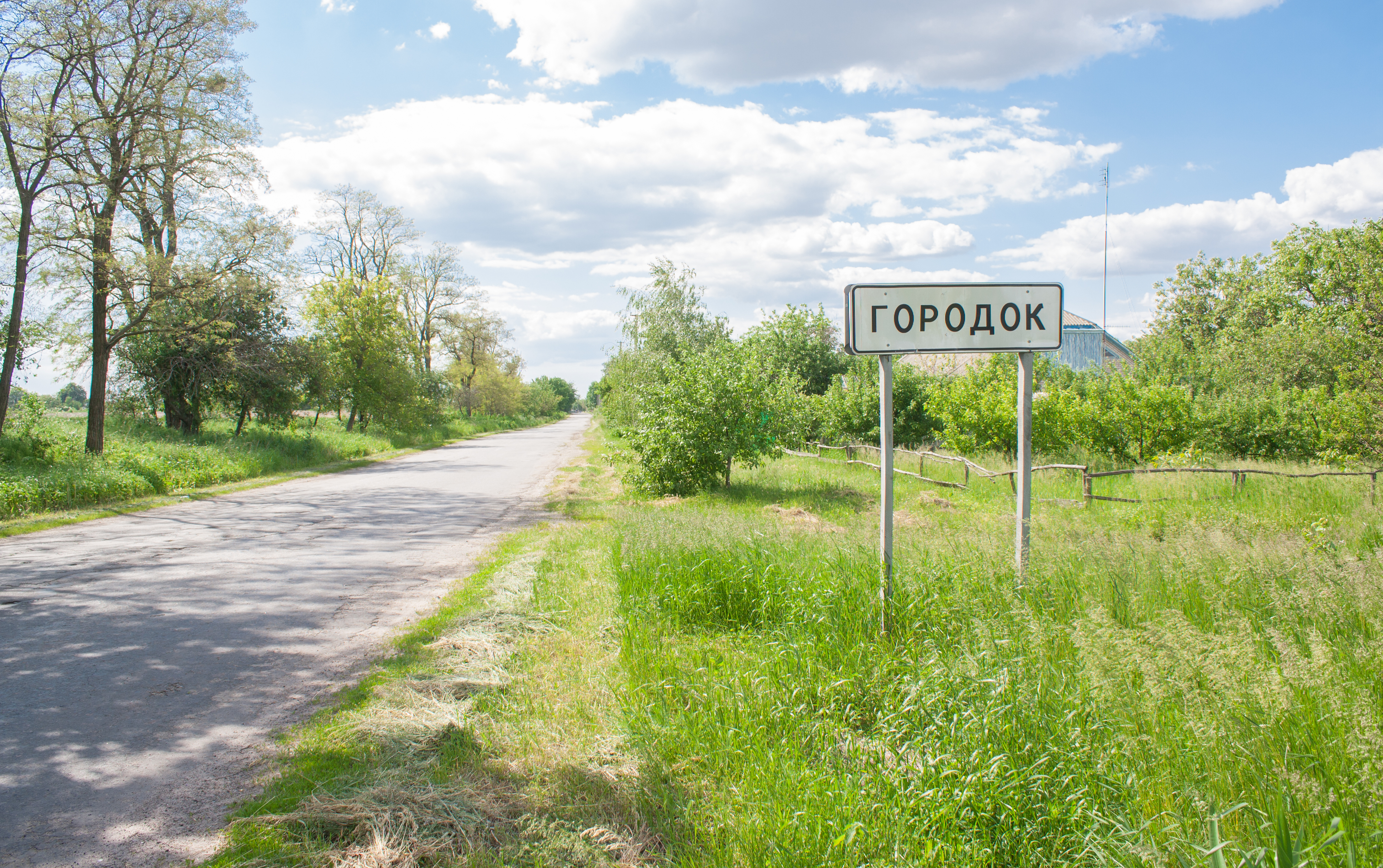
Village entrance

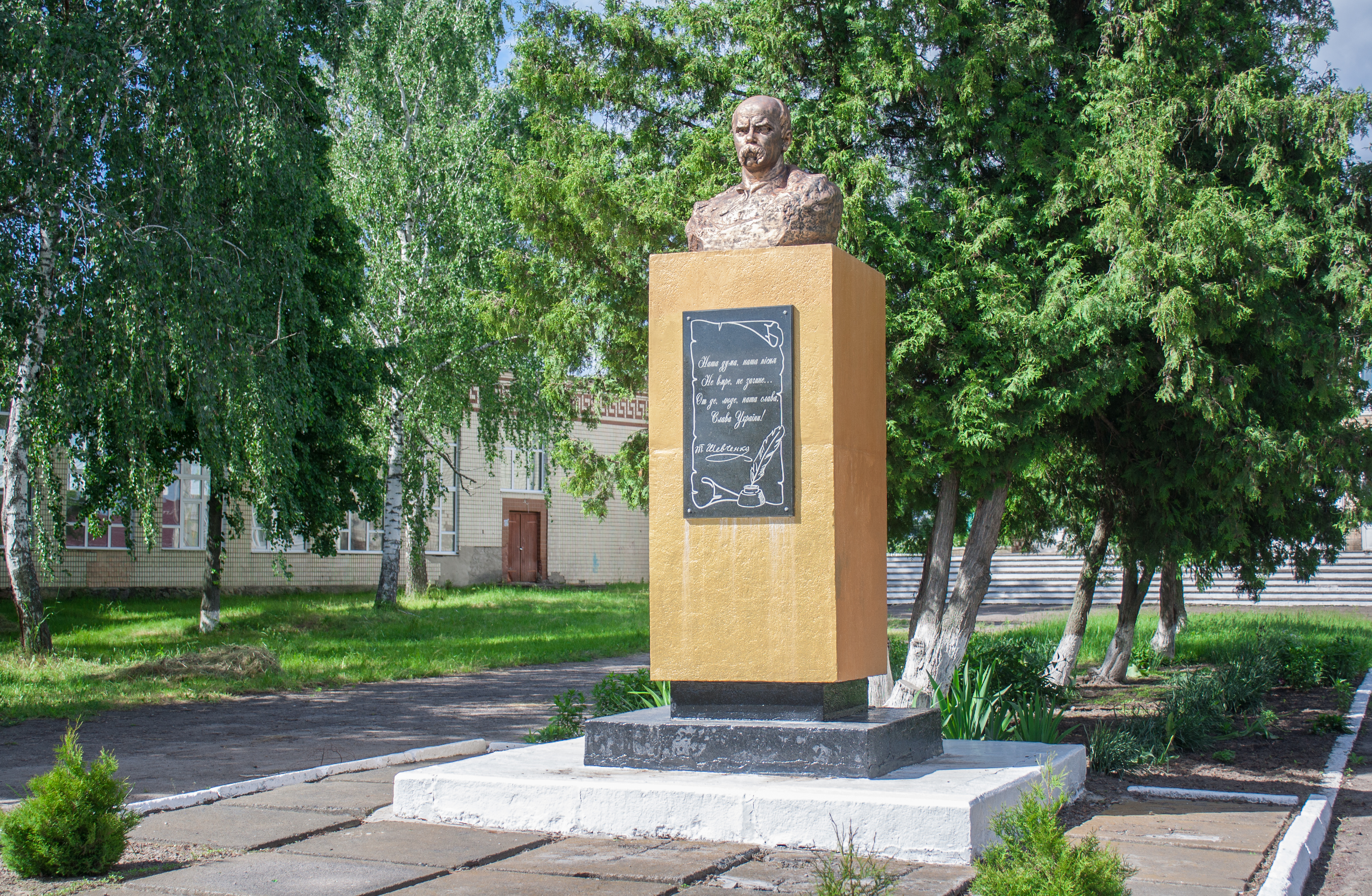
Monument to T. Shevchenko

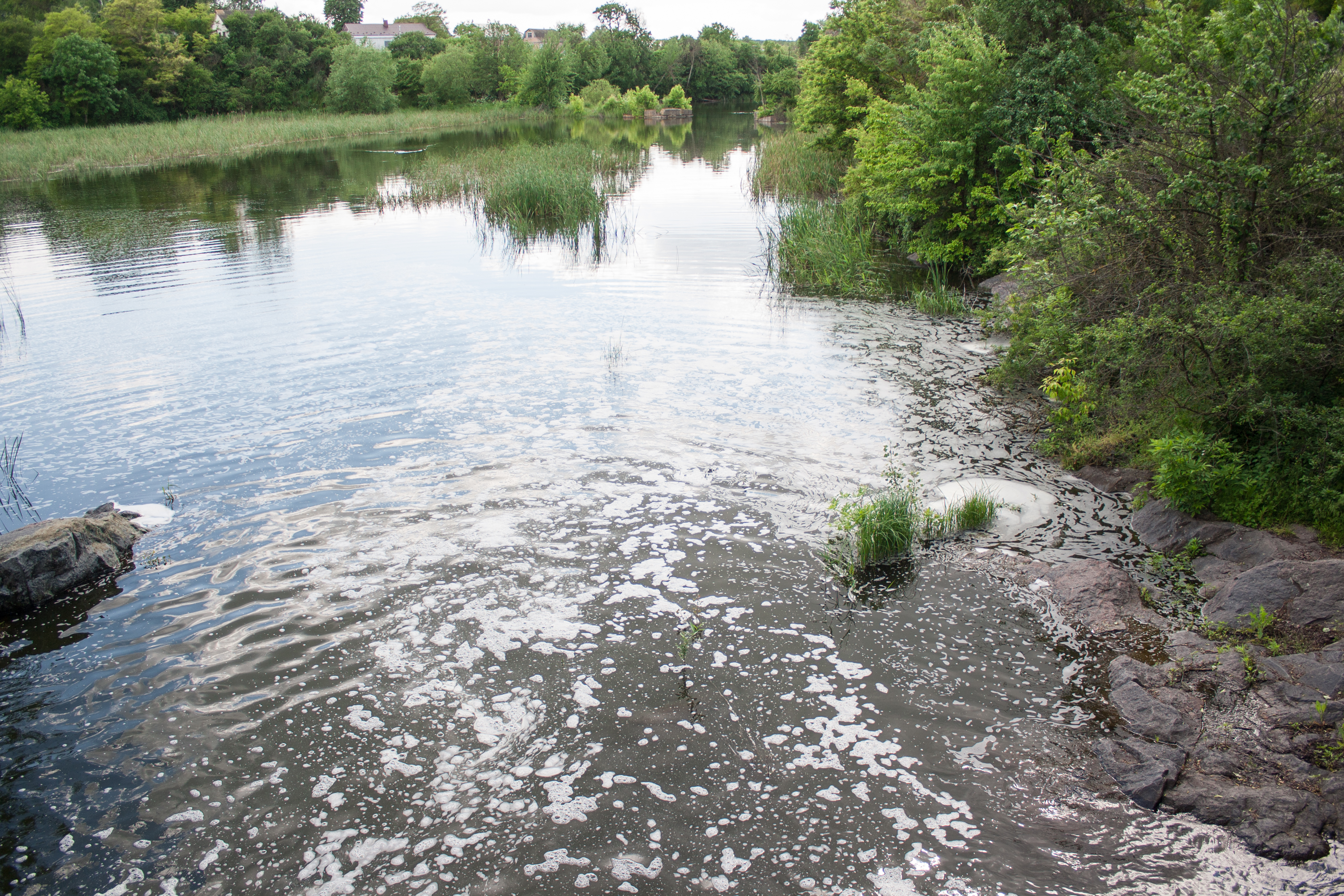
Soroka River

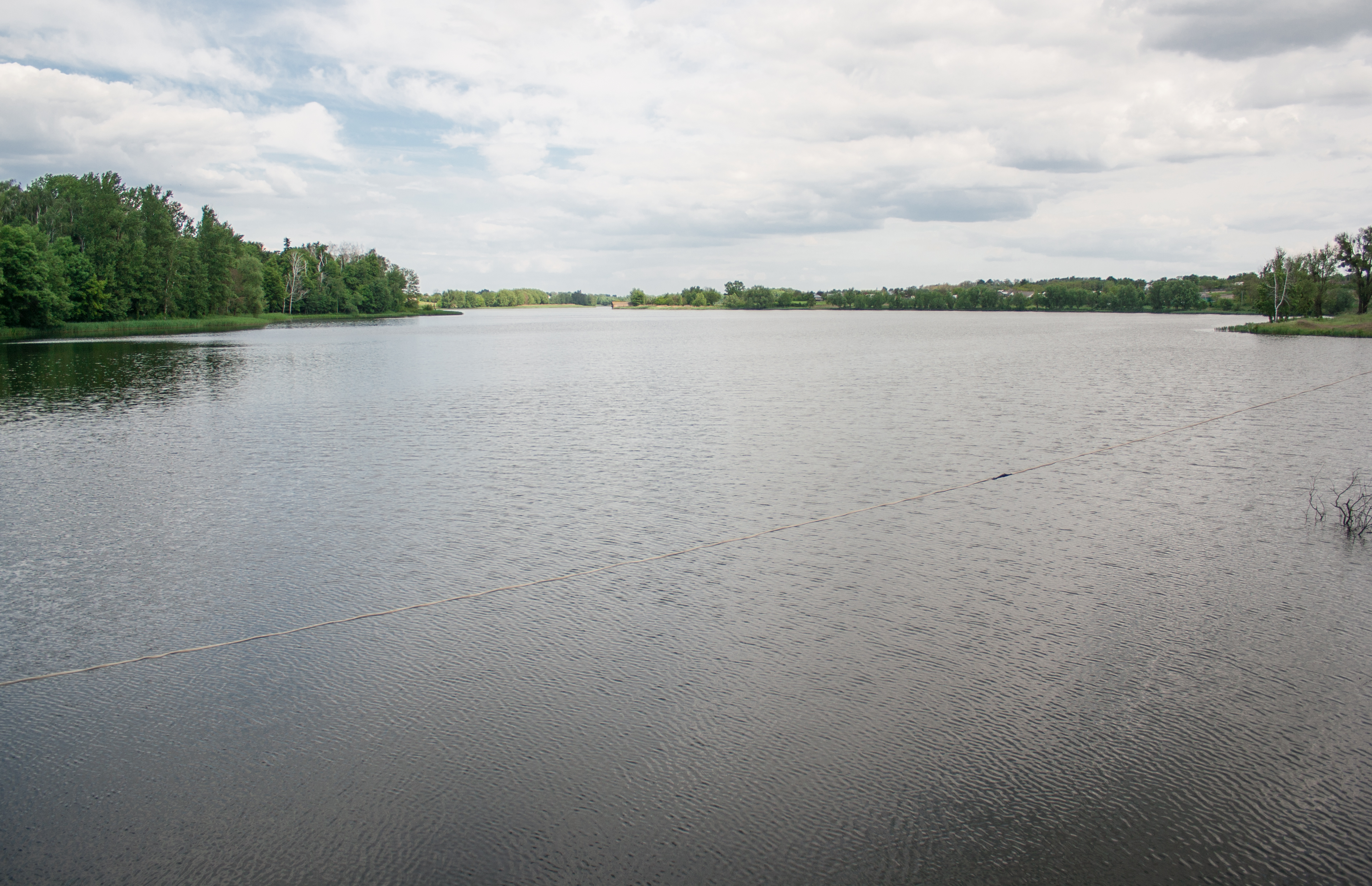
Pond

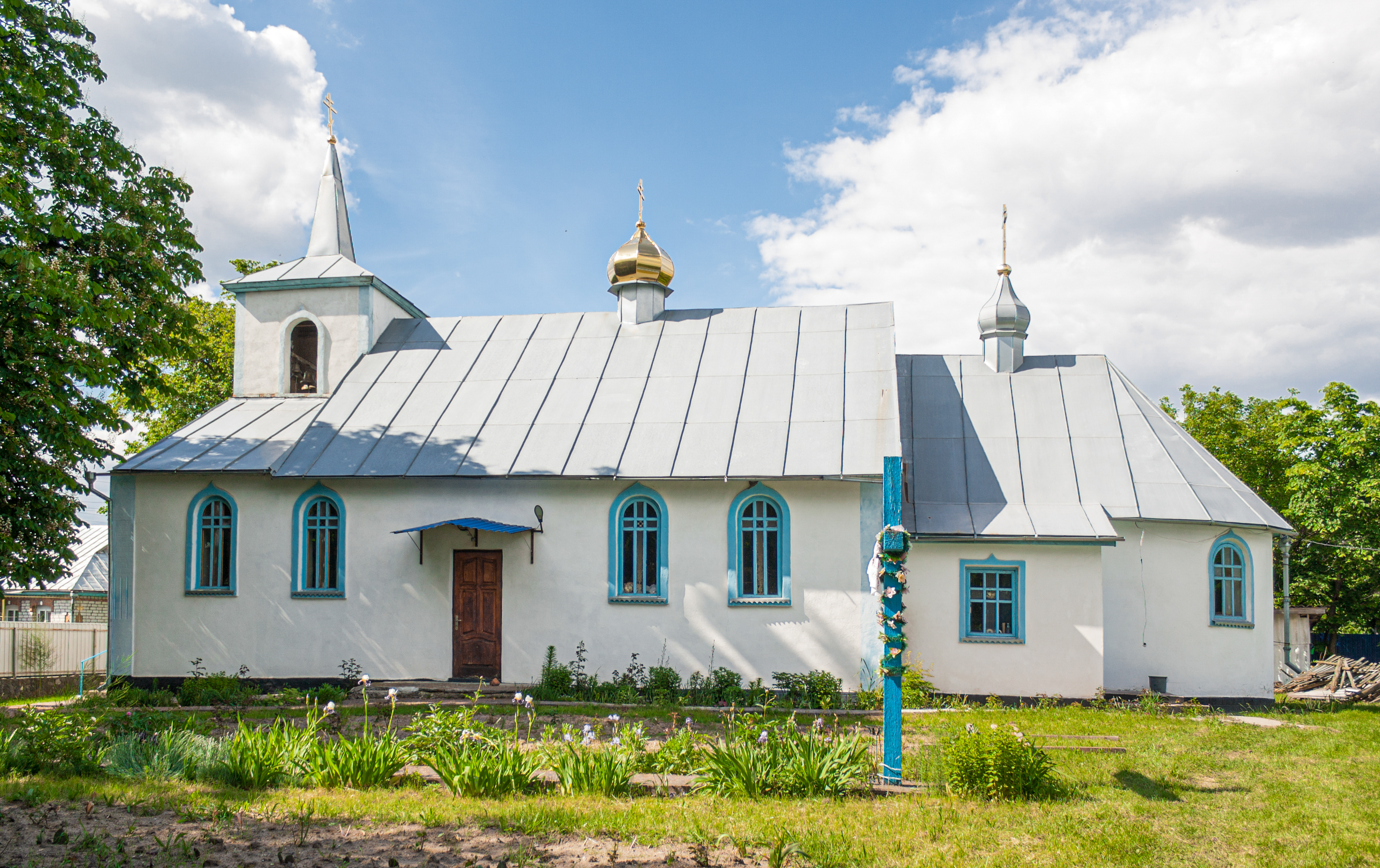
Church

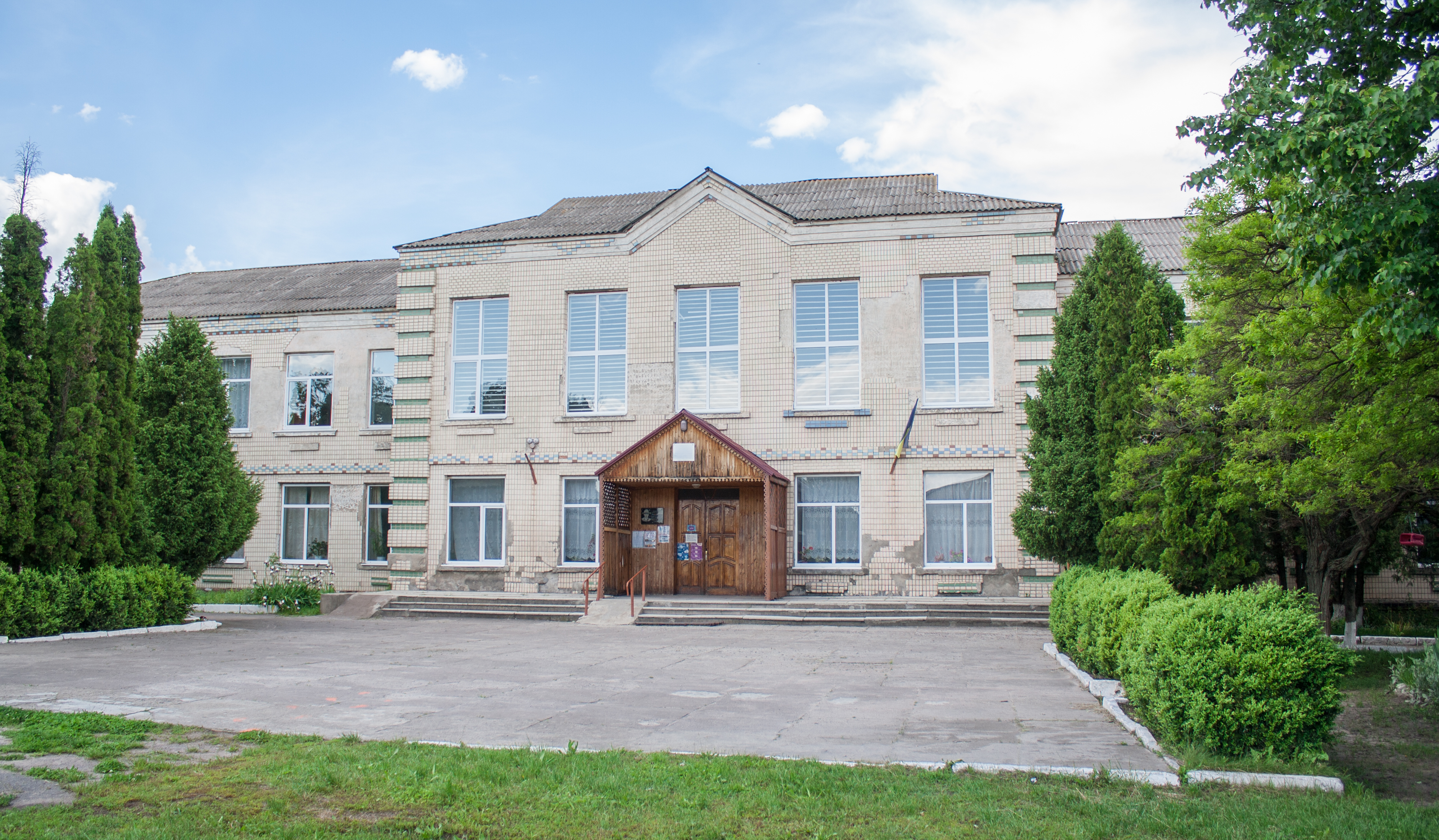
School
