= Viitivka =

Village in Haisyn Raion, Ukraine

Viitivka Війтівка
- Village
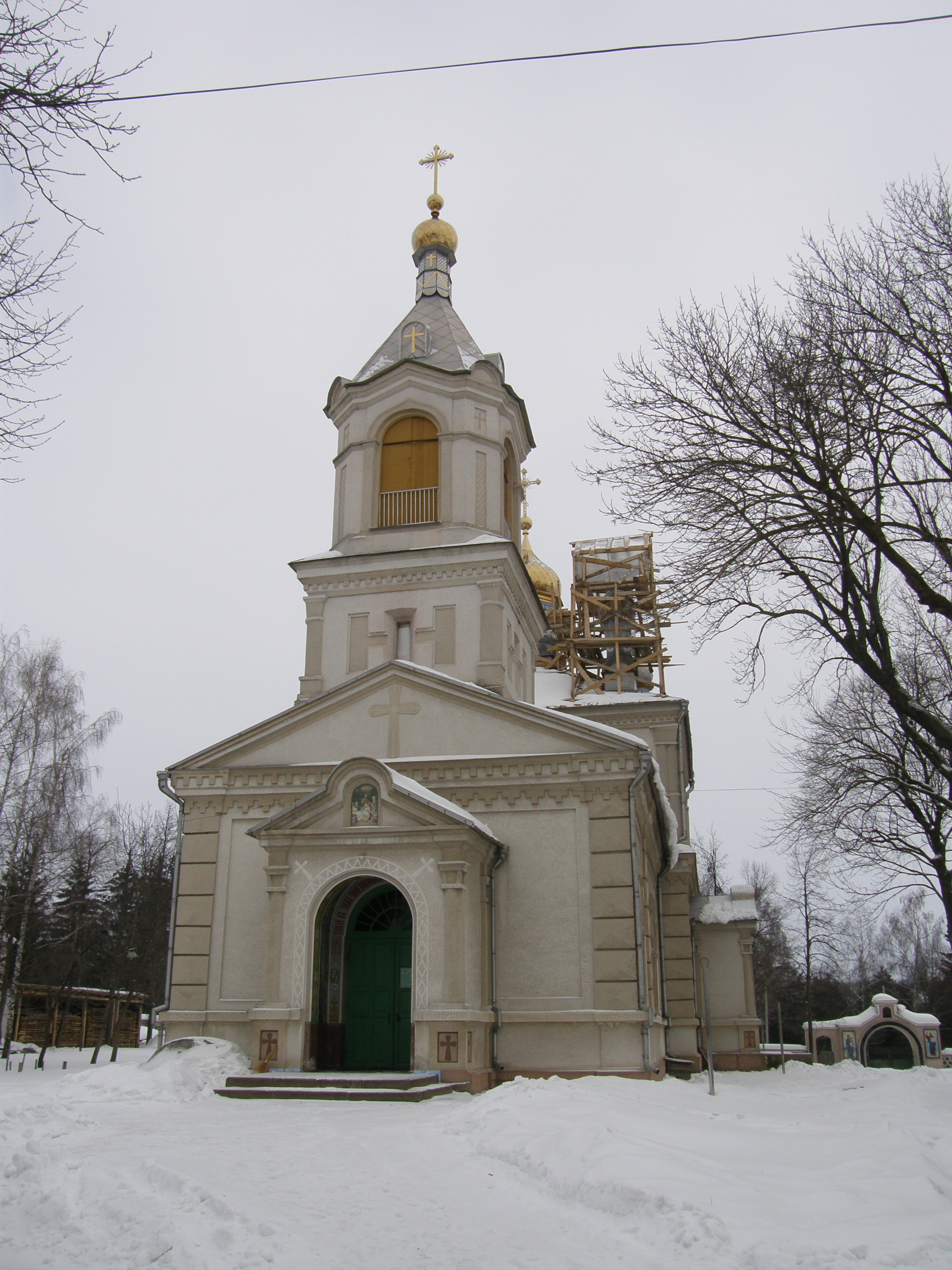
- Church of the Nativity of the Virgin

- Location in Vinnytsia Oblast Viitivka (Vinnytsia Oblast)
- Coordinates: 48°25′21″N 29°32′25″E
- Country: Ukraine
- Oblast: Vinnytsia Oblast
- Raion: Haisyn Raion
- Village founded: 1625

Area
  - Total: 69.53 km^{2} (26.85 sq mi)
- Elevation: 189 m (620 ft)

Population (2022)
  - Total: 3,682
  - Density: 63.77/km^{2} (165.2/sq mi)
- Time zone: UTC+2 (EET)
  - Summer (DST): UTC+3 (EEST)
- Postal code: 24412
- Area code: +380 435243

Viitivka (Ukrainian: Війтівка) is a village in Haisyn Raion, Vinnytsia Oblast, Ukraine. The village has a population of 3,682.
