= Granov volost =

Historical subdivision of Russian Empire

Granov volost Гранівська волость
- Volost
- Country: Russian Empire
- Governorate: Podolia
- Named for: Mikhail Granovsky
- Capital: Granov

Population (1885)
  - Total: 16,012

The Granov volost (Ukrainian: Гранівська волость; Russian: Грановская волость) was a historical administrative-territorial unit of the Gaisyn district of the Podolian governorate, with its center in the town of Graniv. The subdivision was abolished as part of territorial reforms in the Soviet Union and was succeeded by the Granovsky Raion.

== Settlements ==
List of settlements part of the Granov volost:

- Hraniv
- Horodok
- Huncza
- Korytnia
- Leukhy
- Mykhailivka
- Rosokhovata
- Semyrichka
- Slobodyshche
- Sobi Rakhny

== Demographics ==
In 1861, the volost held a population of 6,149 people in a total of 6 settlements. In 1885, it had grown considerably, to a size of 12 settlements and 11 rural communities with a population of 16,012 people (7,970 males and 8,042 females) incorporated in 2,758 households.
