= Kholyava (river) =

River in Ukraine

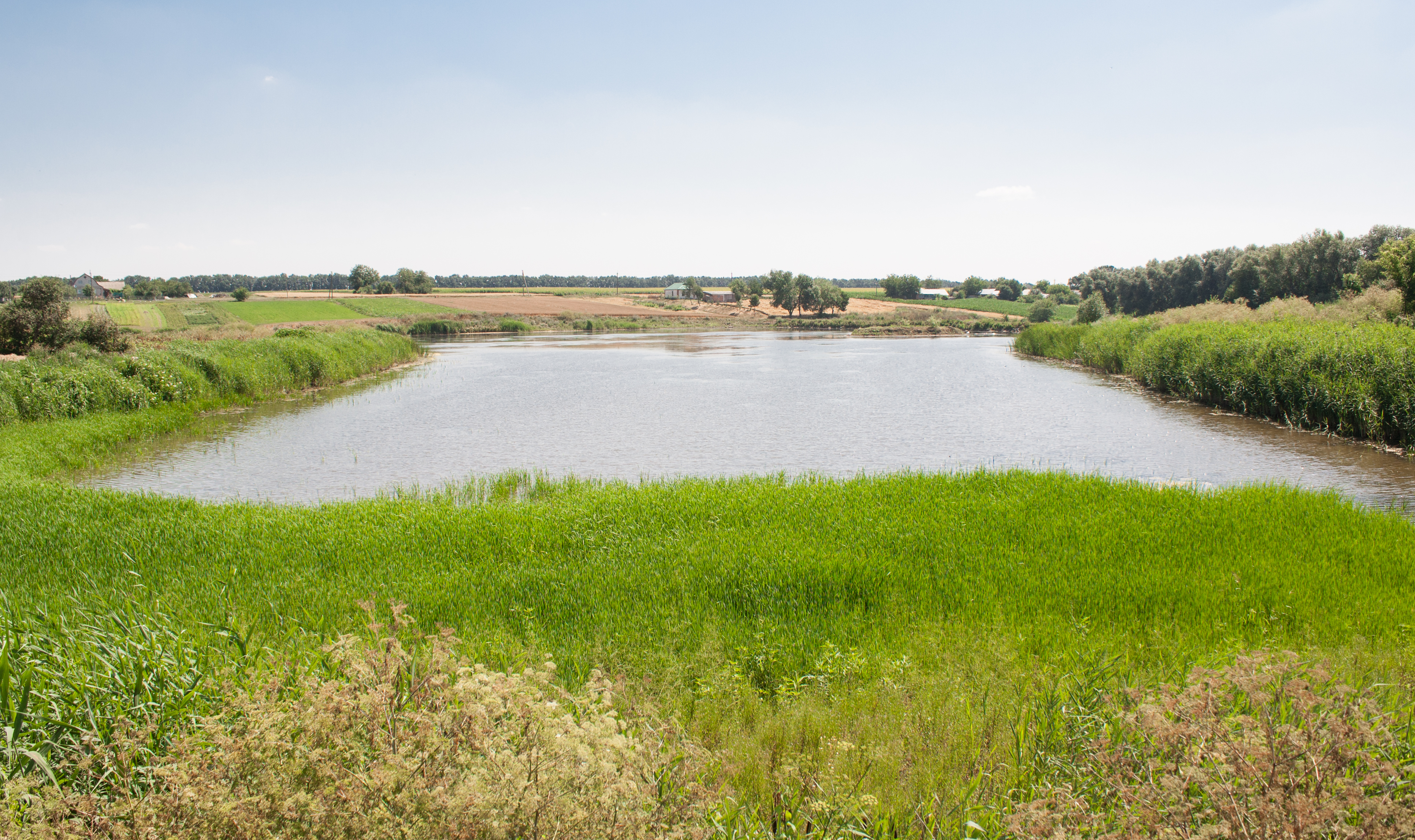
- The Kholyava in Tsvilikhivka

Location
- Country: Ukraine
- Oblast: Vinnytsia Oblast
- Raion: Haisyn Raion

Physical characteristics
- Mouth: Chortala River
  - coordinates: 48°44′44″N 29°41′29″E
- Length: 6.2 km (3.9 mi)
- Basin size: 63,700 km^{2} (24,600 sq mi)

Basin features
- Progression: Dnieper–Bug estuary→ Black Sea

The Kholyava (Ukrainian: Холява) is a river located in Vinnytsia Oblast, Ukraine. it is a right tributary of the Chortala, a tributary of the Sob located in the Southern Bug river basin. It flows through the villages of Dubyna, Haisyn Raion and Tsvilikhivka. It flows into the Chortala 2 km from the latter's mouth, and its length is 6.2 km.
