= Granov =

Granov is a surname. Notable people with the surname include:

- Adi Granov, Bosnian-American comic book artist and conceptual designer
- Emir Granov, Bosnian-Herzegovinian footballer
- Din Granov, Bosnian footballer

== See also ==
- Hraniv, Ukrainian village; Russian name is Granov
