= Teplyk =

Rural settlement in Vinnytsia Oblast, Ukraine

Teplyk Теплик
- Rural settlement
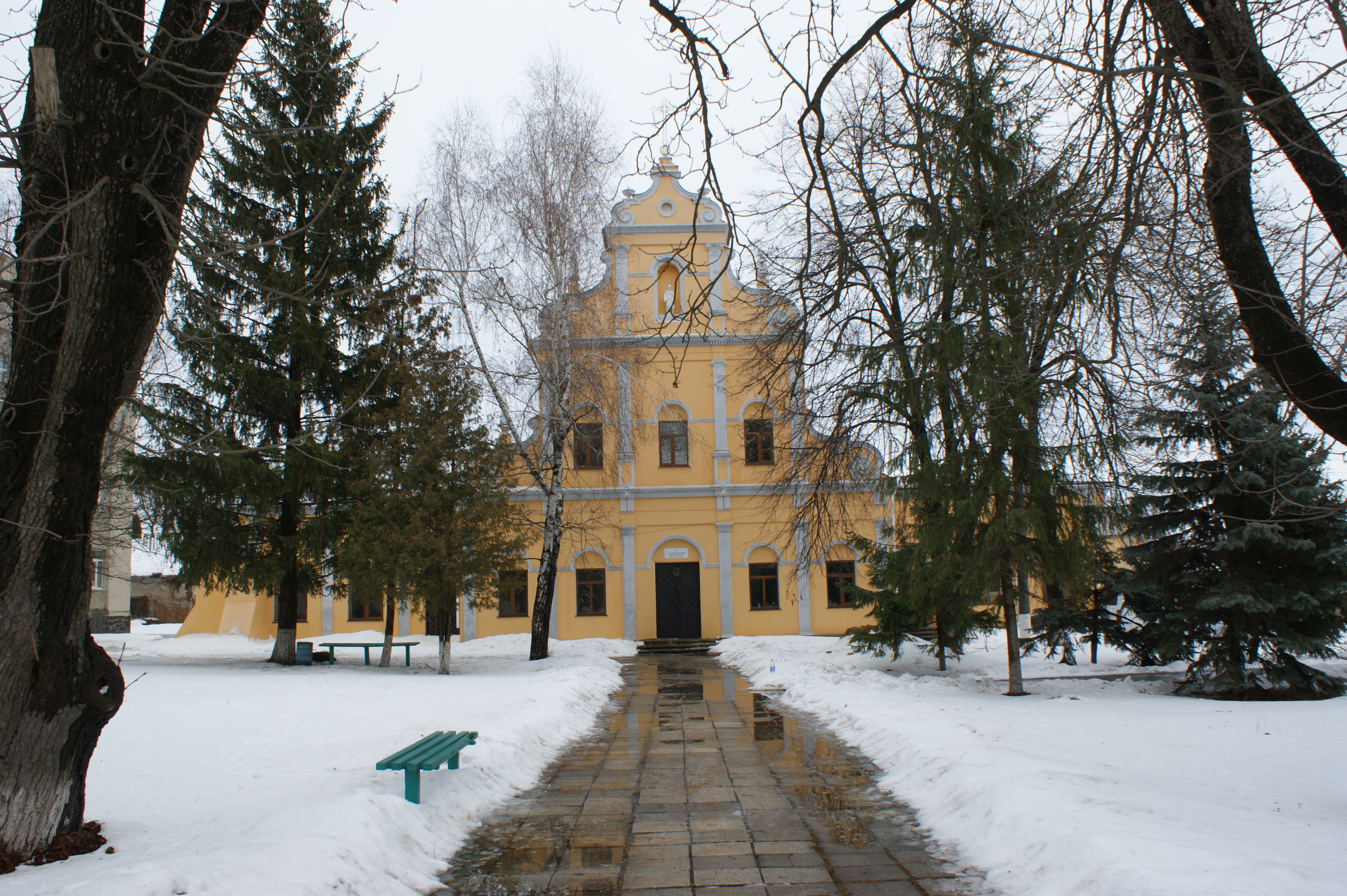
- Church of St. Stanislav in Teplyk

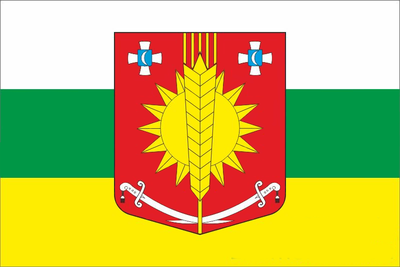
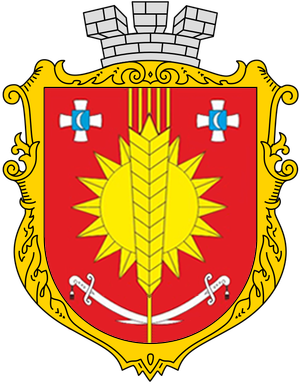
- Flag Coat of arms

- Location within Vinnytsia Oblast Location within Ukraine
- Coordinates: 48°39′34″N 29°45′14″E
- Country: Ukraine
- Oblast: Vinnytsia Oblast
- Raion: Haisyn Raion
- Hromada: Teplyk settlement hromada
- First mentioned: 15th century

Area
  - Total: 3.44 km^{2} (1.33 sq mi)
- Elevation: 193 m (633 ft)

Population (2022)
  - Total: 6,076
  - Density: 1,902/km^{2} (4,930/sq mi)
- Time zone: UTC+2 (EET)
  - Summer (DST): UTC+3 (EEST)
- Postal code: 23800
- Area Code: +380 4353
- KOATUU: 523755100

Teplyk (Ukrainian: Теплик) is a rural settlement in Vinnytsia Oblast, Ukraine. It formerly served as the administrative center of Teplyk Raion, and is now administered within Haisyn Raion. Its population is 6,076 (2022 estimate).

== History ==
The first written mention of Teplyk is from the 15th century. Historical records show that the settlement emerged as a fortified border crossing of the Duchy of Lithuania. Tunnels and caves that were dug in those days still remain. In the 15th and 16th centuries, Teplyk was a small town which suffered frequent damage during enemy attacks.

In 1582, Ivan and Andriy Kishki shared ownership of the town and it became the property of the Ostrogski family. In 1645 Teplyk went to Zhabokrytskyi. Then came Samuel Kalinowski, who annexed the land to Uman.

The population of Teplyk engages mainly in agriculture and handicrafts: mainly leatherworking, shoemaking and smithing. There were also merchants. Historians, researchers, and multiple other sources, explain the origin of the name of Teplyk. The most widespread and ancient belief is that Teplyk got its name from the natural conditions of the region (warm in Ukrainian is теплий – tepliy). This is according to a number of written sources in Polish and Russian. Another version of the name origin is that it comes from the small river the village sits on: Teplychka.

There were times when Teplyk had a second name – Smilhorod. It is believed that this name came from the courage and resilience of the residents who defended their village from enemies and attackers. The ancient settlement of Teplyk was small; it occupied only a triangular piece of land formed by the surrounding streams. They merge in the valley 300 meters from the hill on which the center of Teplyk sits.

Located at the crossroads of trade routes, Teplyk from the 17th to 19th centuries became a significant commercial and manufacturing point. The 300th anniversary of Teplyk was already met in the Russian Empire.

During World War II over 600 residents and natives are reported to have gone to the front. Over 5000 of them reportedly died and more than 7000 soldiers were later awarded military honors.

During the post-war renewal of the city, new enterprises (particularly specializing in agriculture) built new factory buildings, consumer services, the District Council, the Department of the Interior, a city newspaper, a district print shop, hospital, school, State Tax Inspectorate, Palace of Culture and libraries. Over the past 20 years, more factories and commercial shops have appeared.

Until 26 January 2024, Teplyk was designated urban-type settlement. On this day, a new law entered into force which abolished this status, and Teplyk became a rural settlement.
