= Sobolivka, Haisyn Raion, Vinnytsia Oblast =

Village in Haisyn Raion, Ukraine

Sobolivka Соболівка
- Village
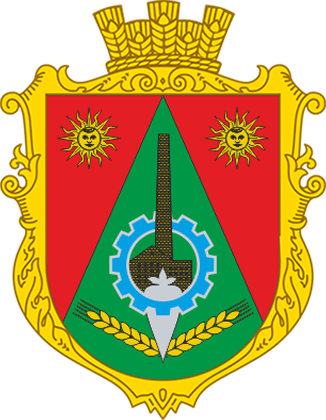
- Coat of arms

- Location within Vinnytsia Oblast Location within Ukraine
- Coordinates: 48°36′0″N 29°30′0″E
- Country: Ukraine
- Oblasts: Vinnytsia Oblast
- Raion: Haisyn Raion

Area
  - Total: 853 km^{2} (329 sq mi)

Population (2004)
  - Total: 3,752
- Postal code: 23820
- Website: http://sobolivka.com.ua

Sobolivka (Ukrainian: Соболівка) is a village in Haisyn Raion of Vinnytsia Oblast in west-central Ukraine. Population is 3,752 (2004). On territory of village is: railway station of Duklya, saccharine (does not work) brickwork, 2 schools, 2 children garden, house of culture, hospital, church (Rizdvyano-bogoroditskiy temple - 1790, 1852 reconstructed). The river of Derkachka flows through the village. Distance is from Sobolivki to Kyiv - 293 kilometres.

== History ==
The settlement of Sobolivka was founded in the place where once existed the city of Sables, founded the Buh Cossacks for protecting of edge from the raids of Tatars. An original fortress was furnished two large earthen billows. Tatars pranged a fortress, and populations destroyed. Afterwards here was a new settlement with the name of Sobolivka, which entered in the complement of domains of the Polish counts of Pototskikh.

Until 18 July 2020, Sobolivka was located in the Teplyk Raion. The raion was abolished and its territory was merged into Haisyn Raion on that day as part of the administrative reform of Ukraine, which reduced the number of raions of Vinnytsia Oblast to six.

== Notable people ==
- Tetiana Yakovenko (born 1954), poet, literary critic, teacher
