= Teplyk Raion =

Former subdivision of Vinnytsia Oblast, Ukraine

Teplyk Raion Теплицький район
- Raion
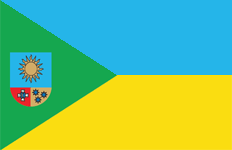
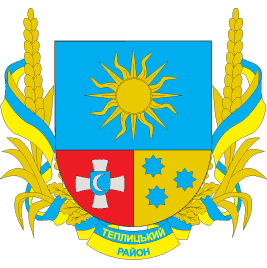
- Flag Coat of arms

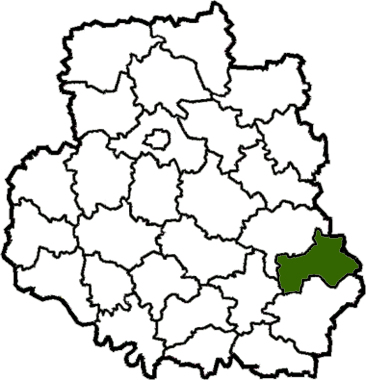
- Coordinates: 48°40′N 29°45′E
- Country: Ukraine
- Oblast: Vinnytsia Oblast
- Established: 1930
- Disestablished: 18 July 2020
- Admin. center: Teplyk
- Subdivisions: List: — city councils; — settlement councils; — rural councils; Number of localities: — cities; — urban-type settlements; 47 — villages; — rural settlements

Government
  - Governor: N/A

Area
  - Total: 810 km^{2} (310 sq mi)

Population (2020)
  - Total: 26,946
  - Density: 33/km^{2} (86/sq mi)
- Time zone: UTC+02:00 (EET)
  - Summer (DST): UTC+03:00 (EEST)
- Postal index: 23800
- Area code: 3804353
- Website: Teplitskiy region

Teplyk Raion (Ukrainian: Теплицький район, romanized: Teplyc'kyj rajon) was a raion (district) of Vinnytsia Oblast in west-central Ukraine. The administrative center of the district was an urban-type settlement of Teplyk. The raion was abolished, and its territory was merged into Haisyn Raion on 18 July 2020 as part of the administrative reform of Ukraine, which reduced the number of raions in Vinnytsia Oblast to six. The last estimate of the raion population was 26,946 (2020 est.).

== Settlements ==
Rural settlements in Teplyk raion included:

- Antonivka
- Bdzhilna
- Bridok
- Velyka Mochulka
- Veselivka
- Zavadivka
- Zaluzhzhia
- Karabelivka
- Kyvachivka
- Komarivka
- Kostiukivka
- Mala Mochulka
- Markivka
- Metanivka
- Mysharivka
- Orlivka
- Petrashivka
- Pobirka
- Pohorila
- Polohy
- Rozkoshivka
- Rososha
- Sasha
- Sobolivka
- Sokyriany
- Stepanivka
- Strazhhorod
- Teplyk
- Topolivka
- Udych
- Shymanivka

== Books on Teplyk Raion ==
In 2015, Rodovid Press published the book Karabelіvka. The land of Our Ancestors - the Land of Our Heirs by Gennady Romanenko.

In 2016, the State Committee for Television and Radio Broadcasting of Ukraine put Romanenko's book into competition for Ukrainian Book of the Year Presidential Award, in the category "For contribution to the development of Ukrainian Studies".

== See also ==
- Administrative divisions of Vinnytsia Oblast
