= Zwillich =

Zwillich or Zwilich is a German-language surname. The word "Zwillich" literally means a type of drill (fabric). Notable people with the surname include:

- Ellen Taaffe Zwilich
- Julie Zwillich
