= Hraniv =

Village in Vinnytsia Oblast, Ukraine

Hraniv Гранів
- Village
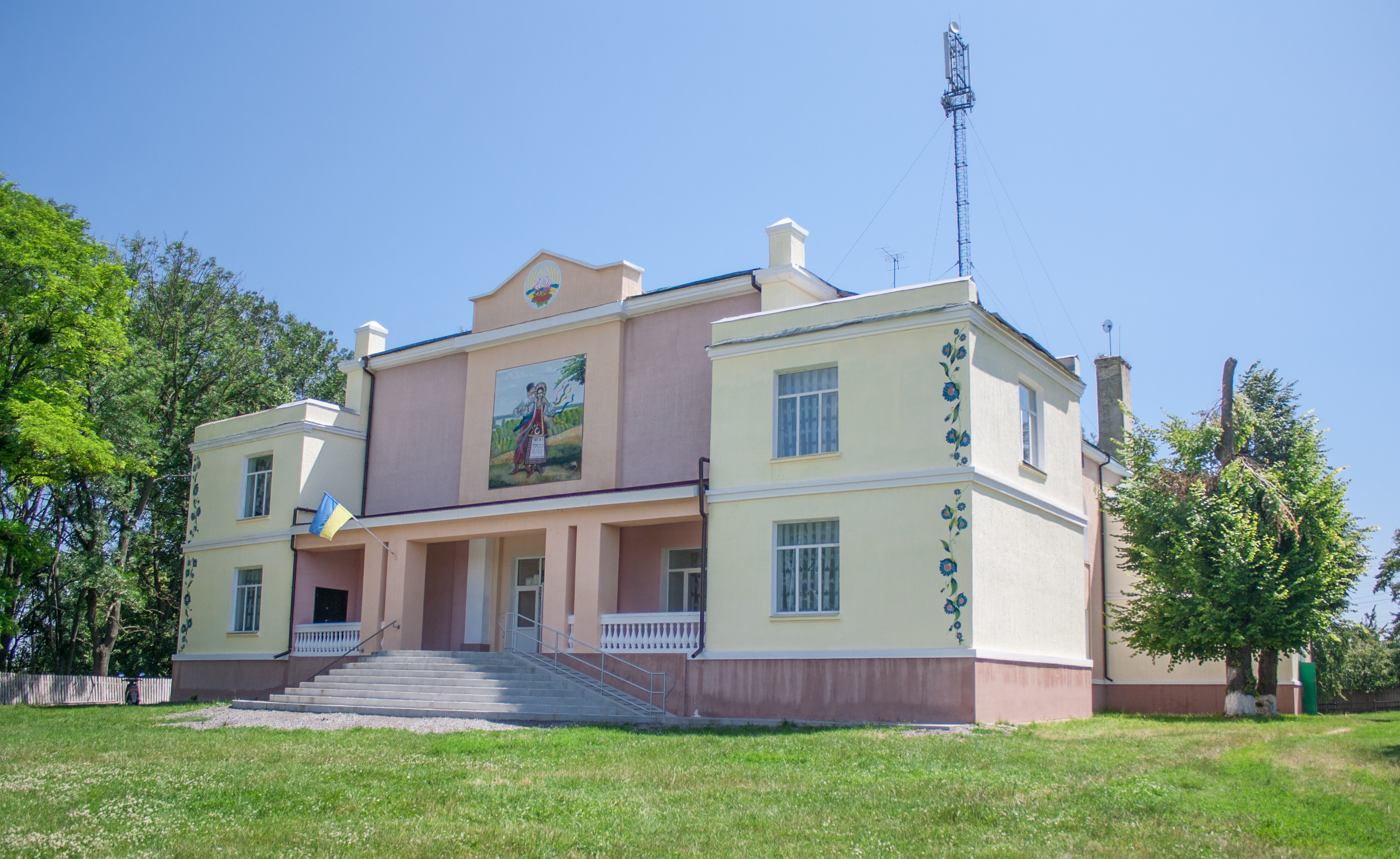
- Hraniv's house of culture

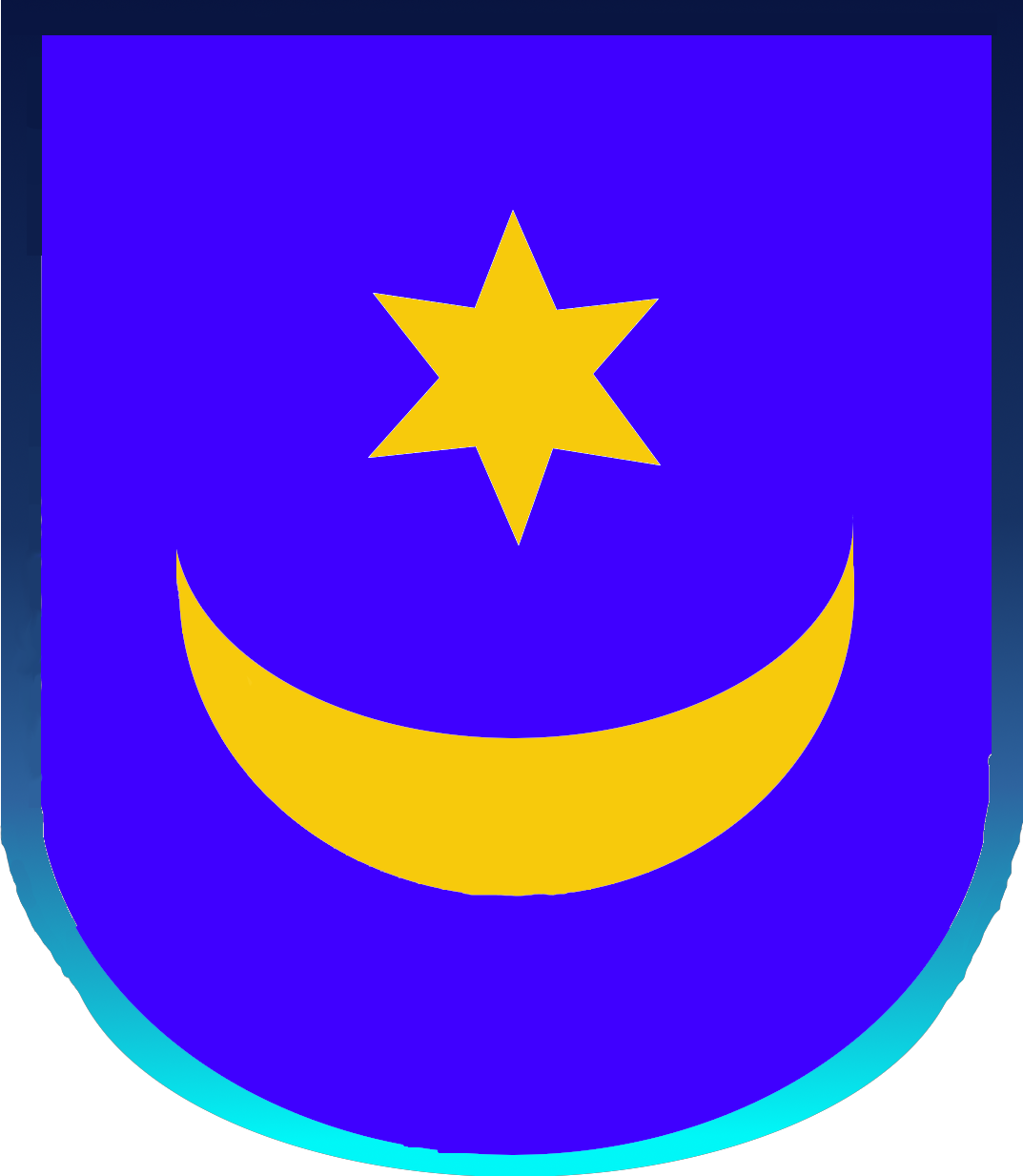
- Coat of arms

- Location of Hraniv Hraniv (Ukraine)
- Coordinates: 48°52′18″N 29°34′02″E
- Country: Ukraine
- Oblast: Vinnytsia Oblast
- Raion: Haisyn Raion
- Hromada: Krasnopil rural hromada
- Founded: 1007 (disputed)

Area
  - Total: 9.207 km^{2} (3.555 sq mi)
- Elevation: 212 m (696 ft)

Population
  - Total: 2,312
  - Density: 251.1/km^{2} (650.4/sq mi)
- Postal code: 23731
- Area code: +380 4334

Hraniv also Graniv (Ukrainian: Гранів; Old Polish: Granów; Russian: Гранов; Yiddish: גראַנאָוו) is a village in the Krasnopil rural hromada, Haisyn Raion, Vinnytsia Oblast, Ukraine. It is located on both banks of the Verbich River,^{[uk]} a second-level tributary of the Southern Bug. It is 11 km northeast of Haisyn and 11 km from the M30 highway.

== History ==
According to local legend, the settlement was initially established in the year 1007, and was called Verbych, named after the river that flows through it. Some scholars and historians dispute this claim, saying that it is difficult to prove the age of the village beyond the establishment of Vinnytsia in 1363, despite the millennium celebration of Hraniv occurring in 2007. The village became known as "Granev" in 1411 when Count Mikhail Granovsky under the Grand Duchy of Lithuania. (Granovsky comes from the Russian "Грань" meaning border/edge) In 1605, the land was taken over by Magnate Sieniawski under permission of Prince Yaroshlav, and was transferred to Lord B. Vazhynsky 41 years later, although Vazhynsky was overthrown by Hraniv's inhabitants as a result of the actions of Bogdan Khmelnitsky.

The town received Magdeburg rights in 1744 under the Braslav Voivodeship by order of King Augustus III.

The village's church, Church of St. Mykola (also Church of the Transfiguration), was founded in 1845. The church was consecrated by Bishop Bolesław Kłopotowski.^{[pl]}

During Stalin's reign in the 1930s, Hraniv, being part of the Vinnytsia region, became one of many towns in which citizens were targeted and executed during the Great Purge.

== Demographics ==
The town initially had a low population throughout the Early Modern Age. In 1605, it had a population of 807 people. The population of the town (along with its Granov district) reached 10,000 by the turn of the 20th century. In 1989, it was recorded that there were 3,047 people in the settlement Hraniv. In 2001, it was recorded that the population had fallen to 2,705.

== Jewish settlement ==
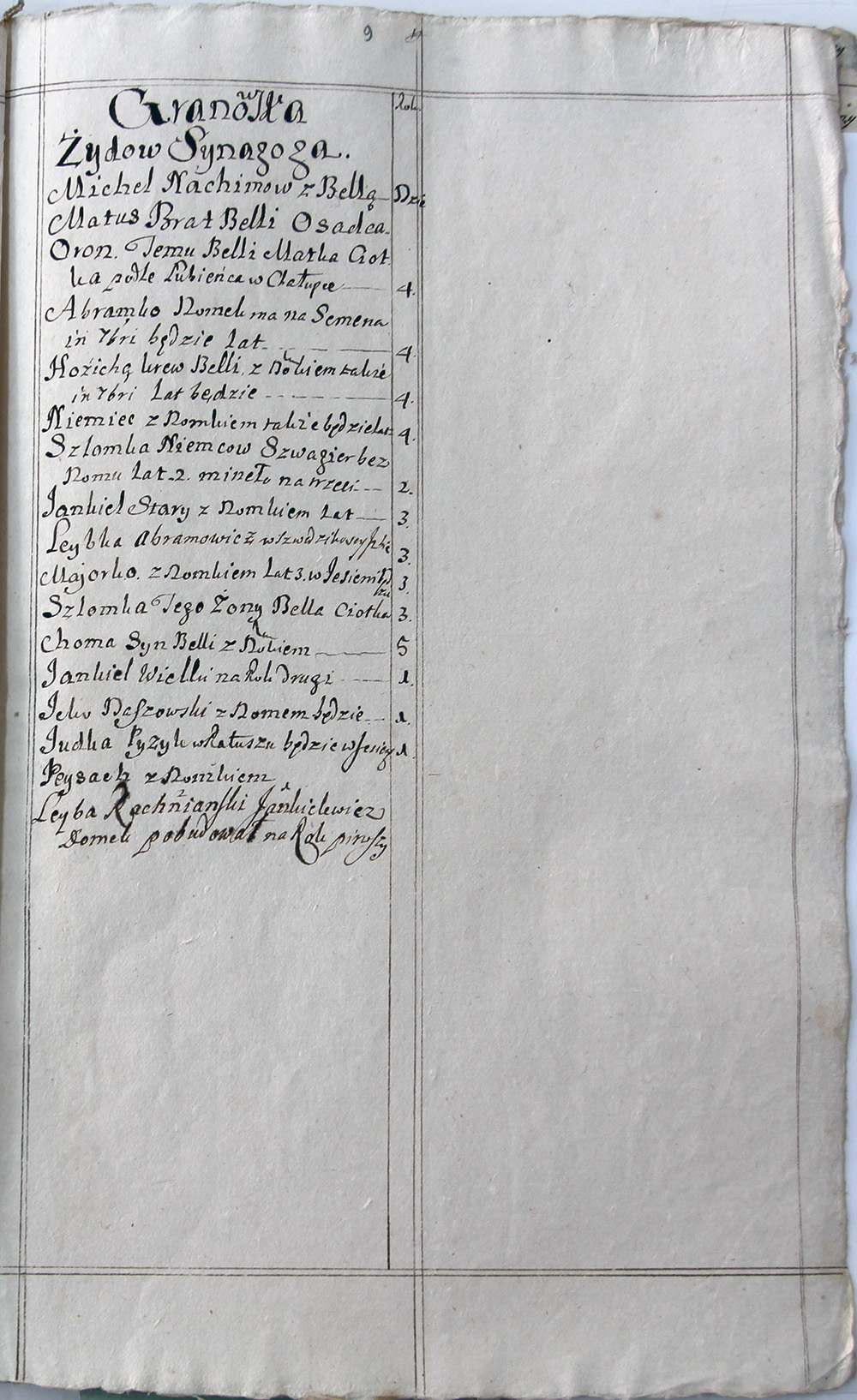
1722 Bratslav census of Jews in the settlement of Hraniv

The town, although originally established before Jewish migration to Eastern Europe, was historically a Jewish-dominated shtetl throughout the period of occupancy by Imperial Russia under the Podolia Governorate. The first record of Jewish presence in Hraniv is in 1738, when the Haydamaks plundered the town, along with Rashkiv, and killed many Jews, and again in 1768. The town was nearly destroyed. The Jewish population was 662 in 1765, and 146 in 1776, as a result of the plundering. The population had risen to 496 by 1790. By 1897, the Jewish population was 753 In modern times, the town is mostly occupied by Ukrainians, with little to no Jewish presence. There is a Jewish cemetery from the pre-war era.

== Gallery ==
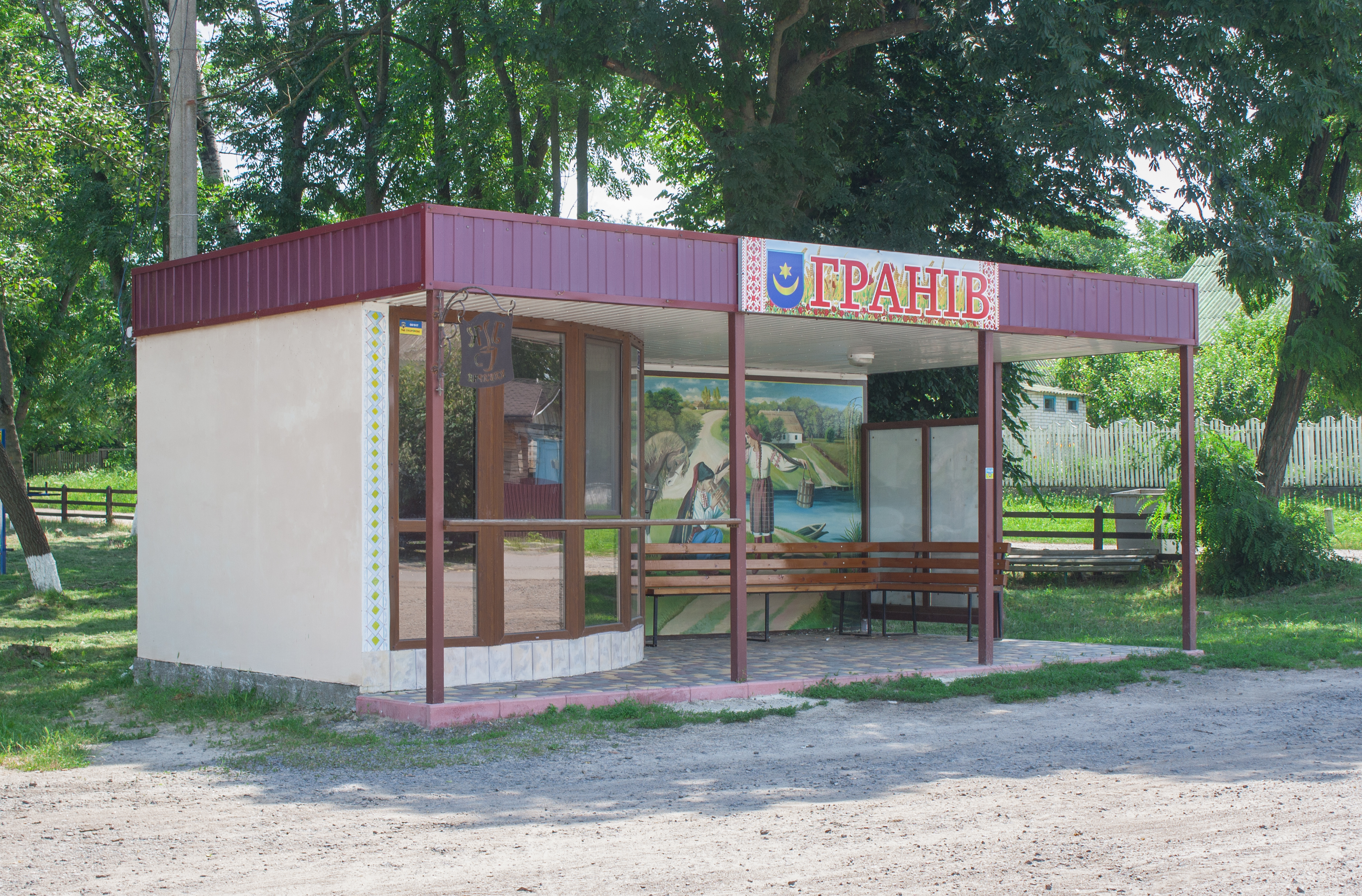
Bus stop

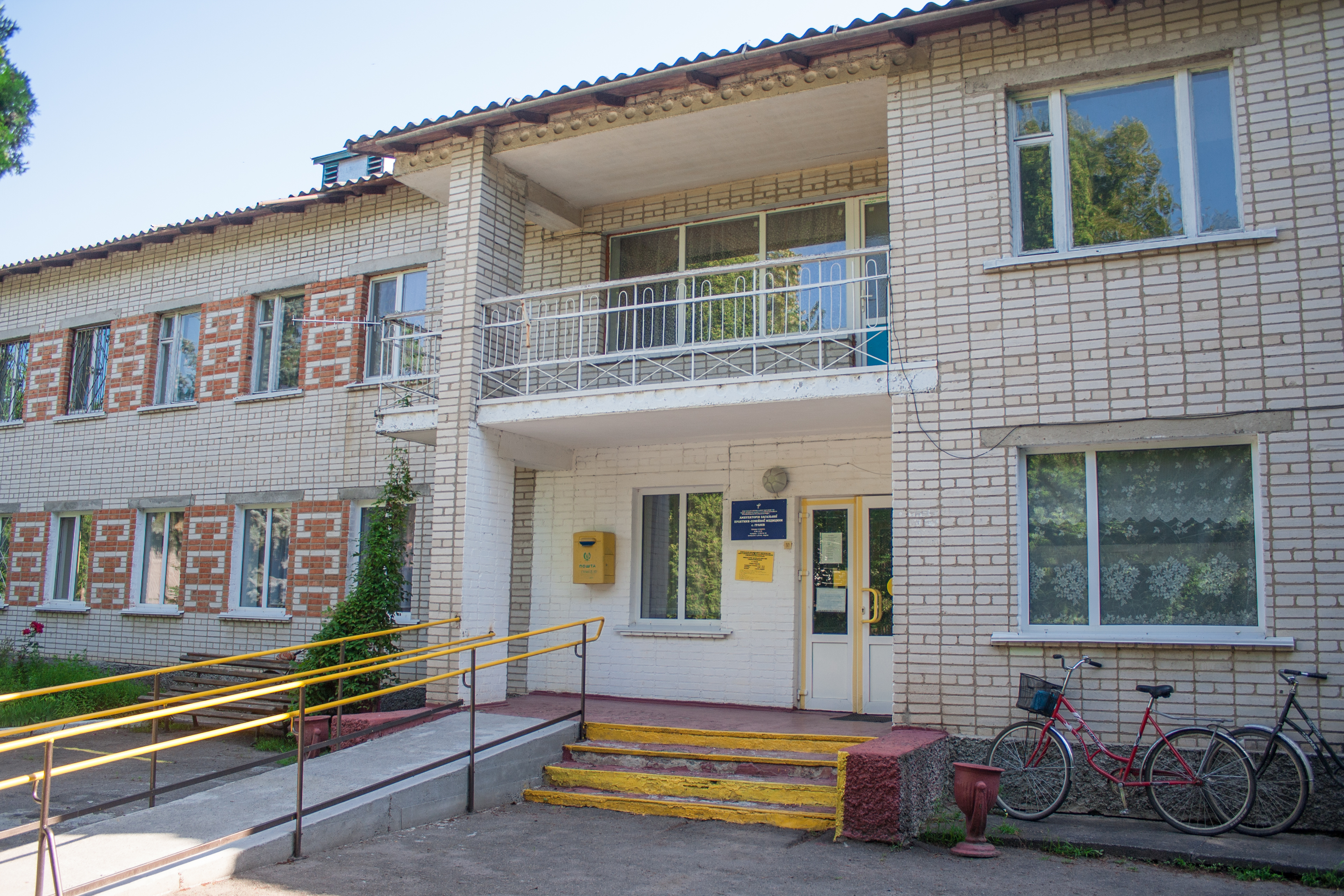
Doctor office/post office

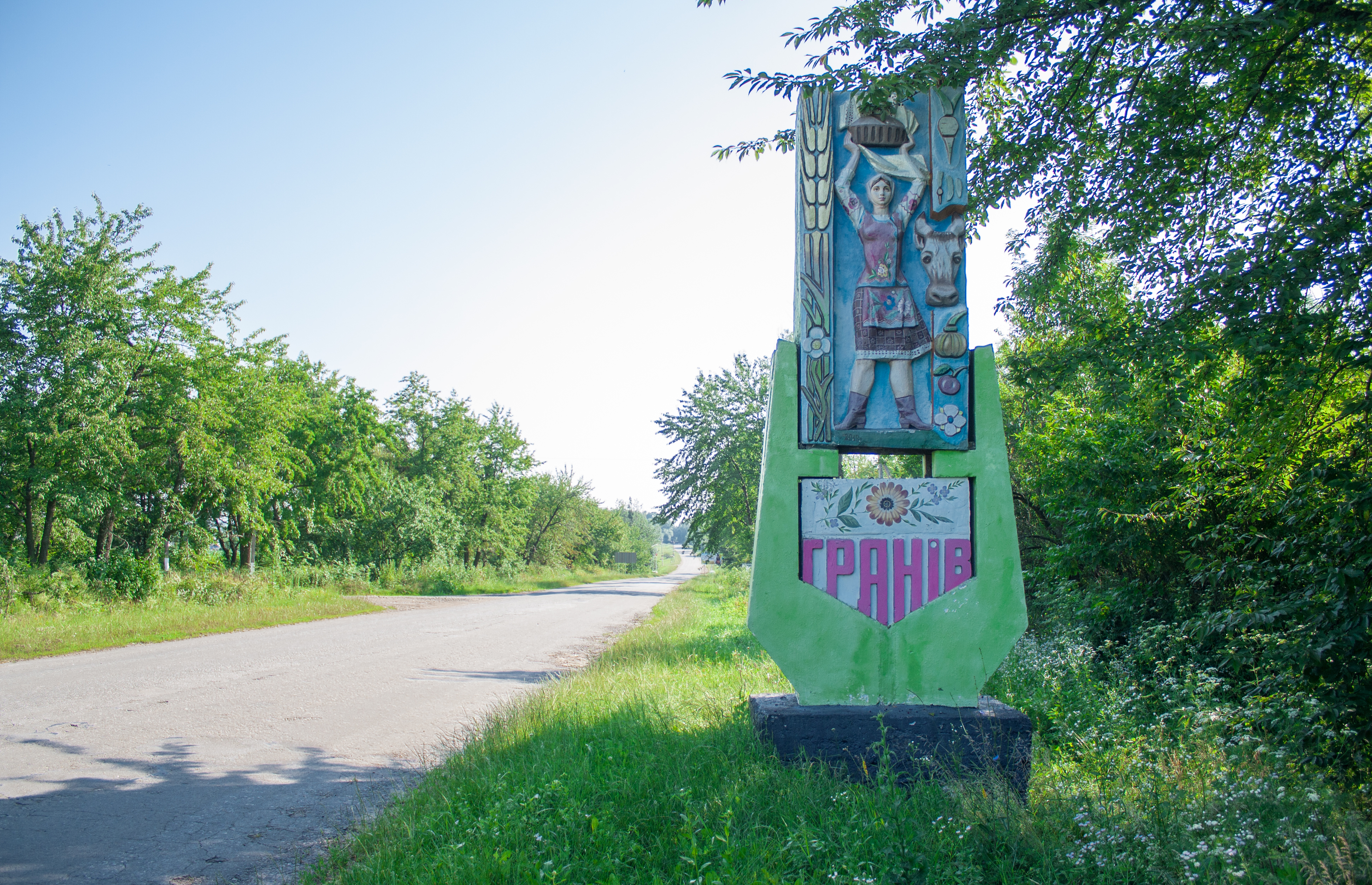
Welcome sign at entrance

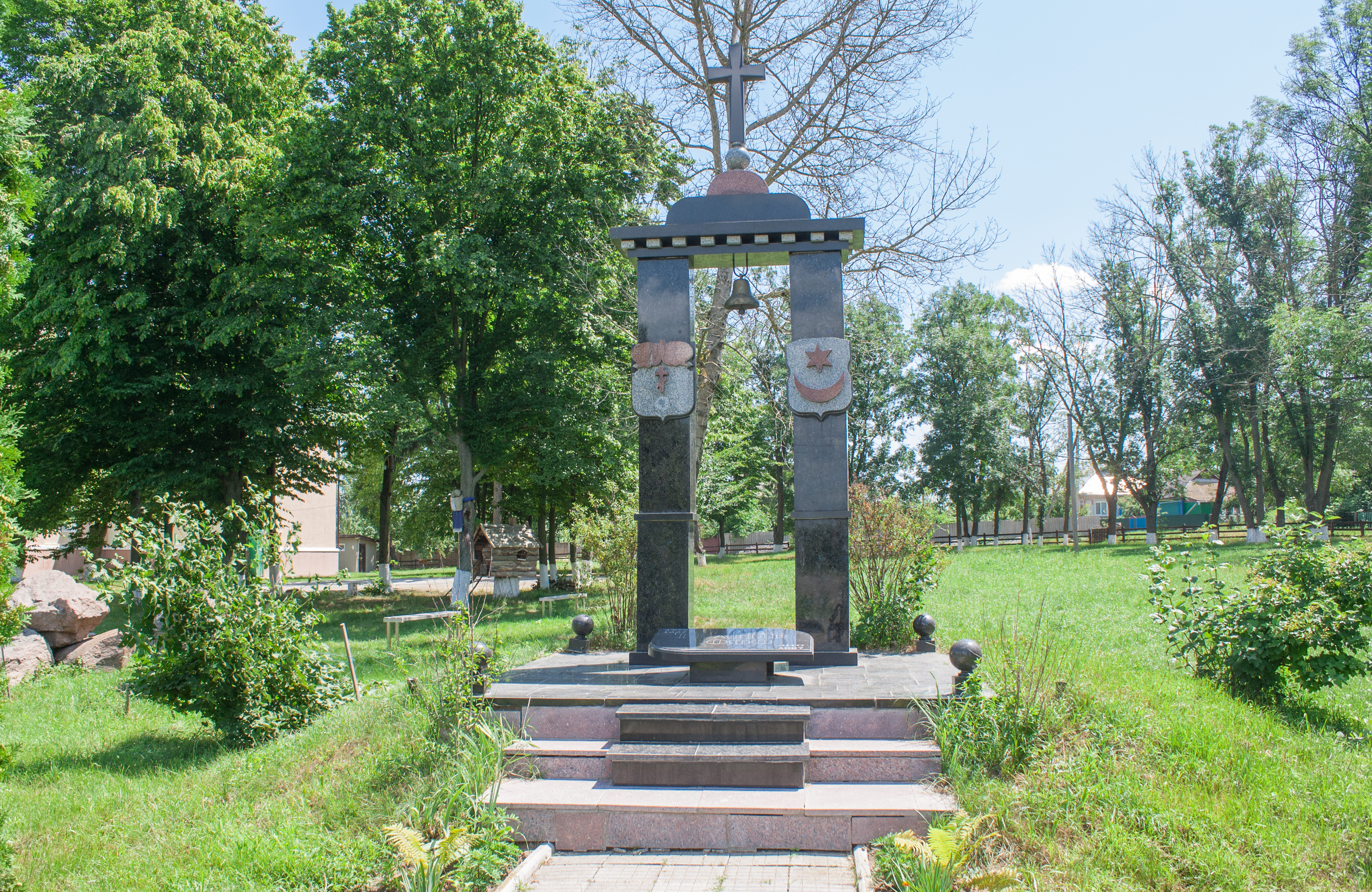
Millenium monument

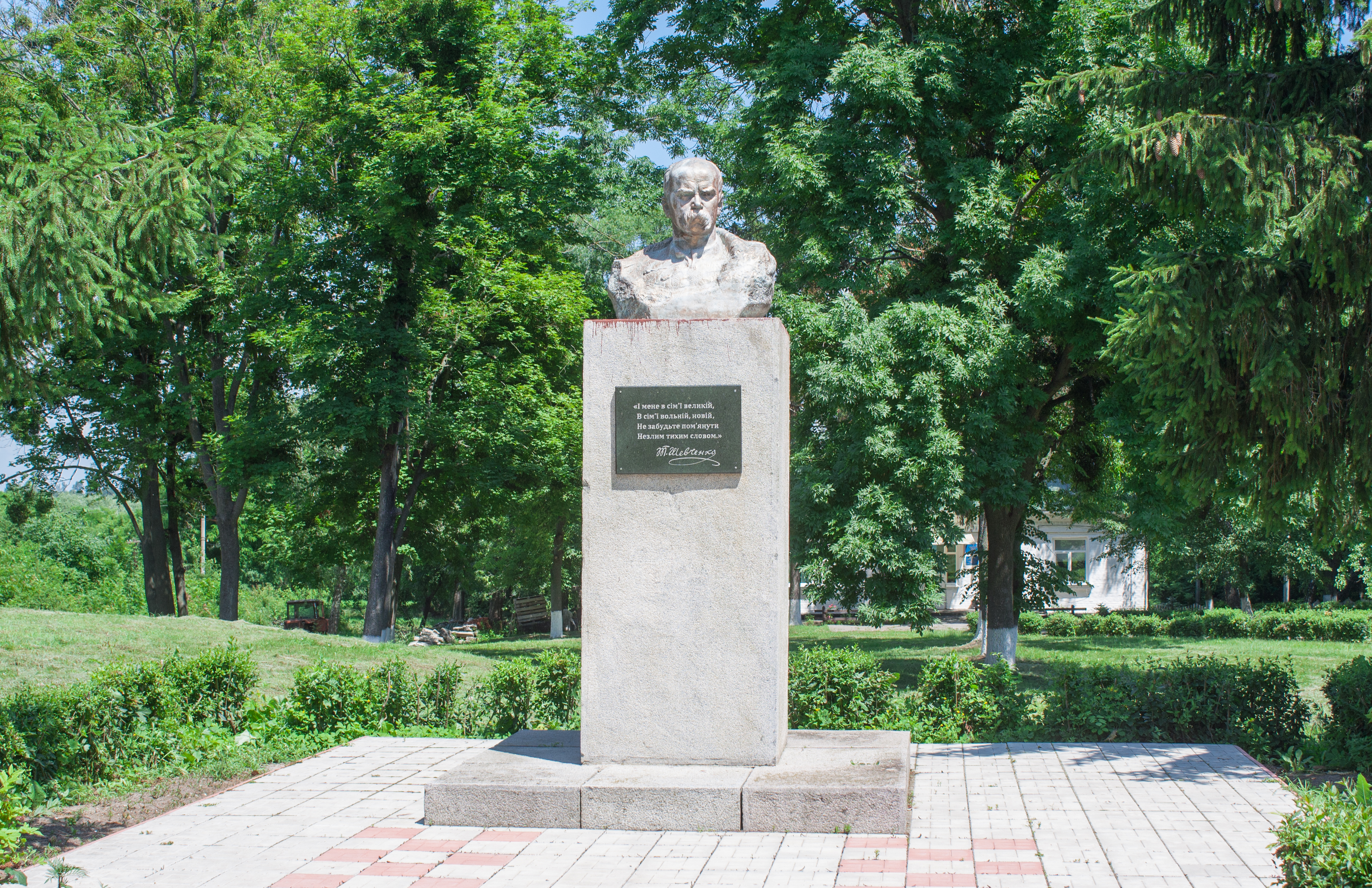
Monument to Taras Shevchenko

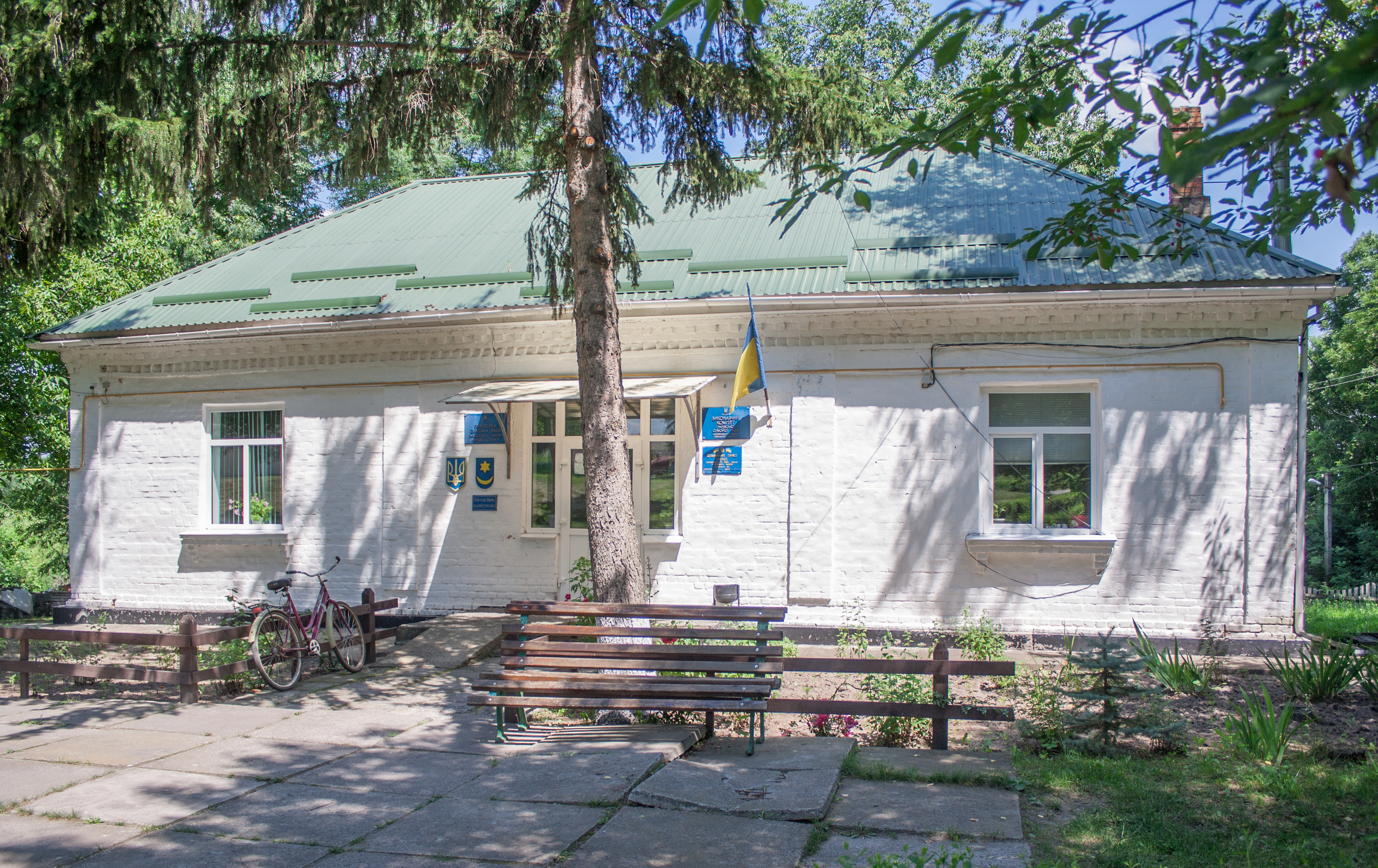
Village council building

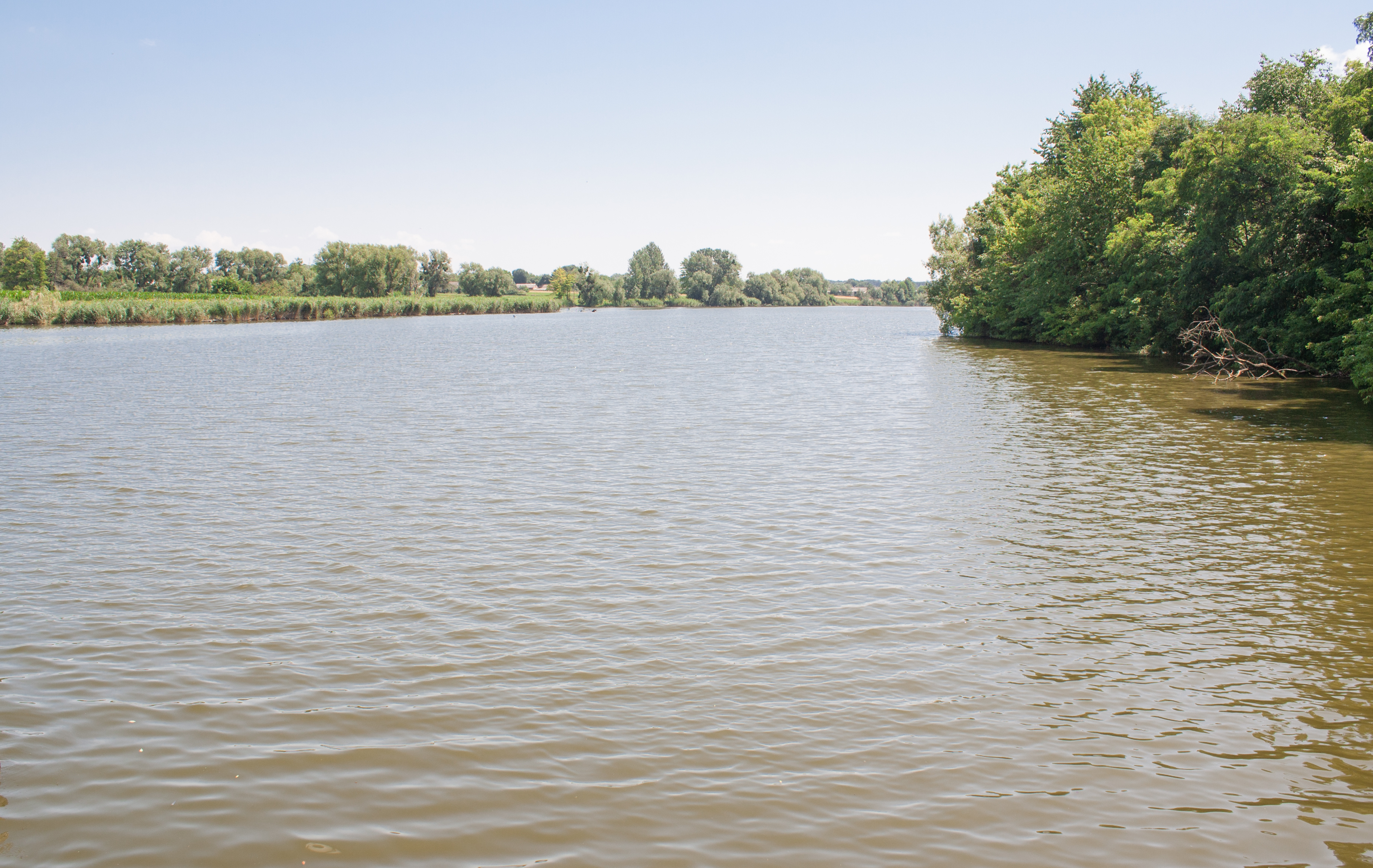
Pond

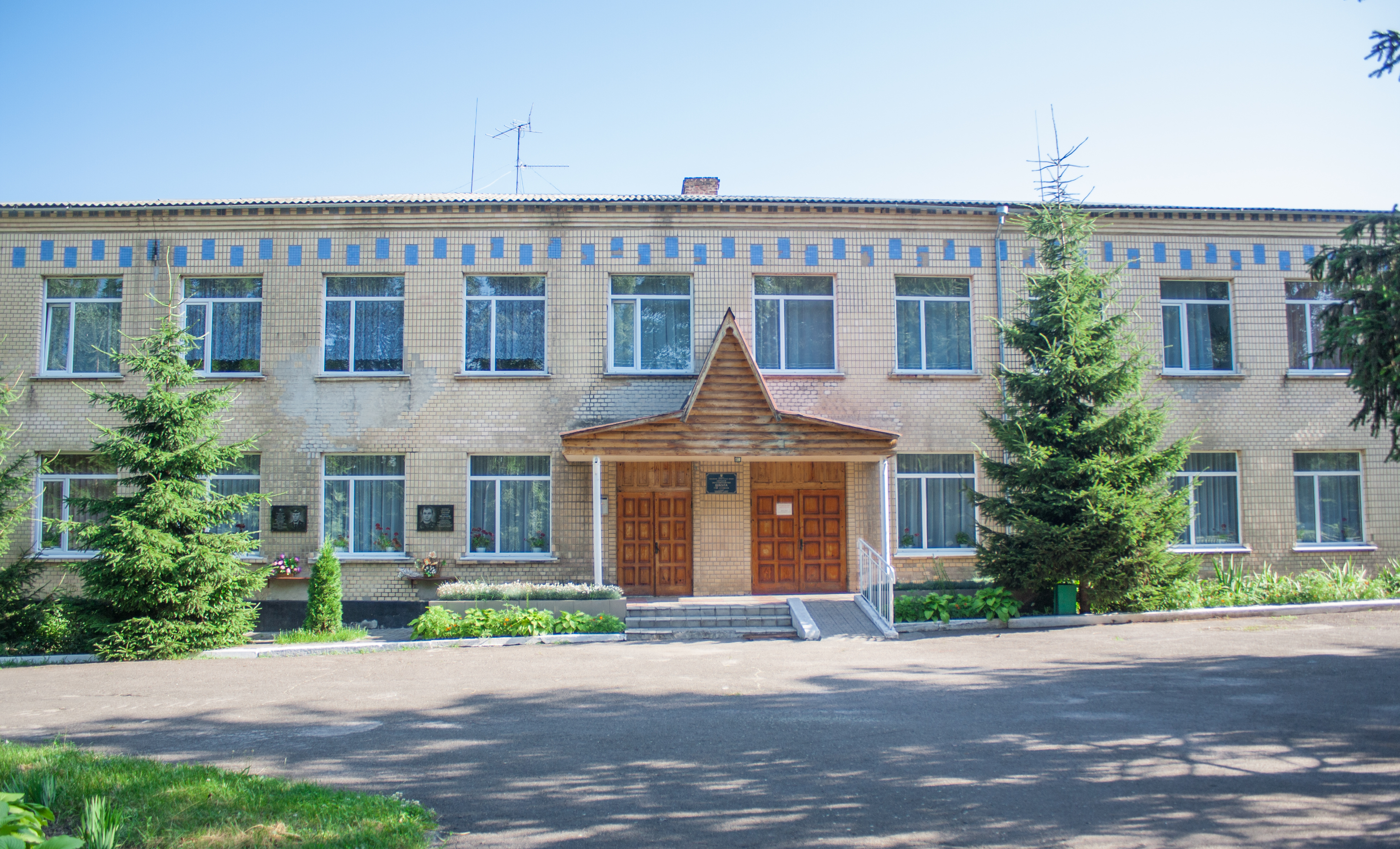
School

== See also ==
- Aerial footage of Hraniv cemetery - Youtube
