= Haisyn Raion =

Subdivision of Vinnytsia Oblast, Ukraine

Coordinates: 48°48′37″N 29°23′03″E

Haisyn Raion Гайсинський район
- Raion
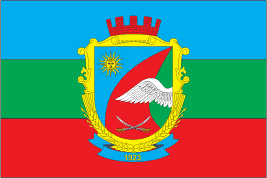
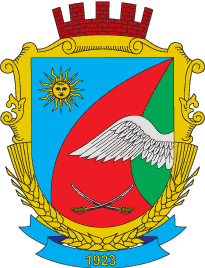
- Flag Coat of arms

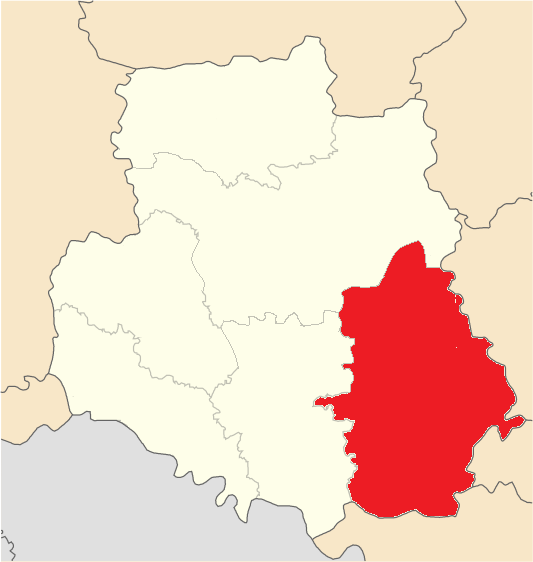
- Interactive map of Haisyn Raion
- Country: Ukraine
- Oblast: Vinnytsia Oblast
- Established: 1923
- Admin. center: Haisyn
- Subdivisions: 14 hromadas

Government
  - Governor: Sergiy Skits

Area
  - Total: 5,674.8 km^{2} (2,191.1 sq mi)

Population (2022)
  - Total: 232,647
  - Density: 40.997/km^{2} (106.18/sq mi)
- Time zone: UTC+02:00 (EET)
  - Summer (DST): UTC+03:00 (EEST)
- Postal index: 23700—23761
- Area code: +380 4334
- Website: https://www.gaysin-rda.gov.ua/

Haisyn Raion (Ukrainian: Гайсинський район) is one of the six raions (districts) of Vinnytsia Oblast, located in southwestern Ukraine. The administrative center of the raion is the town of Haisyn. Population: 232,647 (2022 estimate).

On 18 July 2020, as part of the administrative reform of Ukraine, the number of raions of Vinnytsia Oblast was reduced to six, and the area of Haisyn Raion was significantly expanded. The January 2020 estimate of the raion population was 55,331 (2020 est.).

== Geographic characteristics ==
The area of the district is 5681.2 km^{2}. Haisyn Raion district is located on the Podilska and Dnieper uplands. The relief of the district is an undulating plain, cut by river valleys, ravines, and gullies.

The climate is moderately continental. Winter is cool, summer is not hot. The average temperature in July is +20 °C, in January −5 °C. The maximum precipitation falls in the summer in the form of rain. The average annual amount is from 520 to 590 mm, changing from west to east.

The district is located in the valley of the Southern Bug River. The river in the floodplain has many oxbow lakes and artificial lakes.The largest reservoir in the district is Ladyzhyn.

Haisyn Raion is located in the forest-steppe natural zone. Among the trees in the forests, oaks, hornbeam and maples dominate. Typical large mammals are elk, roe deer, wild boar, squirrels, beavers, hares and wolves. The forests of Haisyn Raion are rich in mushrooms and berries. The soils are mostly lalfisol and typical chernozem. 60% of the district's territory is devoted to tillage.

National Nature Park Karmeliukove Podillia and 4 Reserves of national are located in the district. Karmeliukove Podillia is included in the list of Emerald network sites.

== Communities of the district ==
Number of settlements 263. Number of cities – 3. The Haisyn Raion includes 14 territorial communities. It includes: Ladyzhynska, Bershadska, Haysynska urban territorial communities, Dzhulynska, Krasnopilska, Kunkivska, Raihorodska, Sobolivska, Obodivska, Olhopilska rural territorial communities, Dashivska, Teplytska, Trostyanetska, Chechelnytska settlement territorial communities.

== Transport ==
The district is crossed by railway tracks and highways to Dnipro and Lviv. Passes through Haisyn European route E50.

== Bibliography ==
- Національний атлас України/НАН України, Інститут географії, Державна служба геодезії, картографії та кадастру; голов. ред. Л. Г. Руденко; голова ред. кол.Б.Є. Патон. — К.: ДНВП «Картографія», 2007. — 435 с. — 5 тис.прим. — ISBN 978-966-475-067-4.
- Географічна енциклопедія України : [у 3 т.] / редкол.: О. М. Маринич (відповід. ред.) та ін. — К., 1989—1993. — 33 000 екз. — ISBN 5-88500-015-8.
