= Chernivtsi (disambiguation) =

Chernivtsi is a city in Ukraine on the Prut River in the eponymous oblast and raion in Bukovina.

Chernivtsi, Cernăuți, Chernovitz and variations may also refer to:

== Places ==
- Chernivtsi Raion, Chernivtsi Oblast, Bukovina, Ukraine; a district containing the eponymous city in the eponymous province
- Chernivtsi Oblast, Bukovina, Ukraine; a province containing the eponymous district and eponymous city
- Chernivtsi, Vinnytsia Oblast, Podolia, Ukraine; a town in the eponymous raion
- Chernivtsi Raion, Vinnytsia Oblast, Podolia, Ukraine; a district containing the eponymous town
- Chernivtsi District (1775–1849), Galicia and Lodomeria, Hapsburg Empire
- Cernăuți County, former administrative subdivision of Romania
- Ukrainian Catholic Eparchy of Chernivtsi (bishopric), Archeparchy of Ivano-Frankivsk, Ukraine

=== Facilities and structures ===
- Chernivtsi International Airport, Chernivtsi, Chernivtsi Raion, Chernivtsi Oblast, Ukraine

== Other uses ==
- Chernivtsi University, Chernivtsi, Chernivtsi Raion, Chernivtsi Oblast, Ukraine
- Yemima Avidar-Tchernovitz, Israeli writer

== See also ==
- Proskurov-Chernivtsi Offensive, WWII
- Chernivtsi Raion (disambiguation)
- Chernihiv (disambiguation)
- Yemima Avidar-Tchernovitz
