= Delfina Potocka =

Polish countess

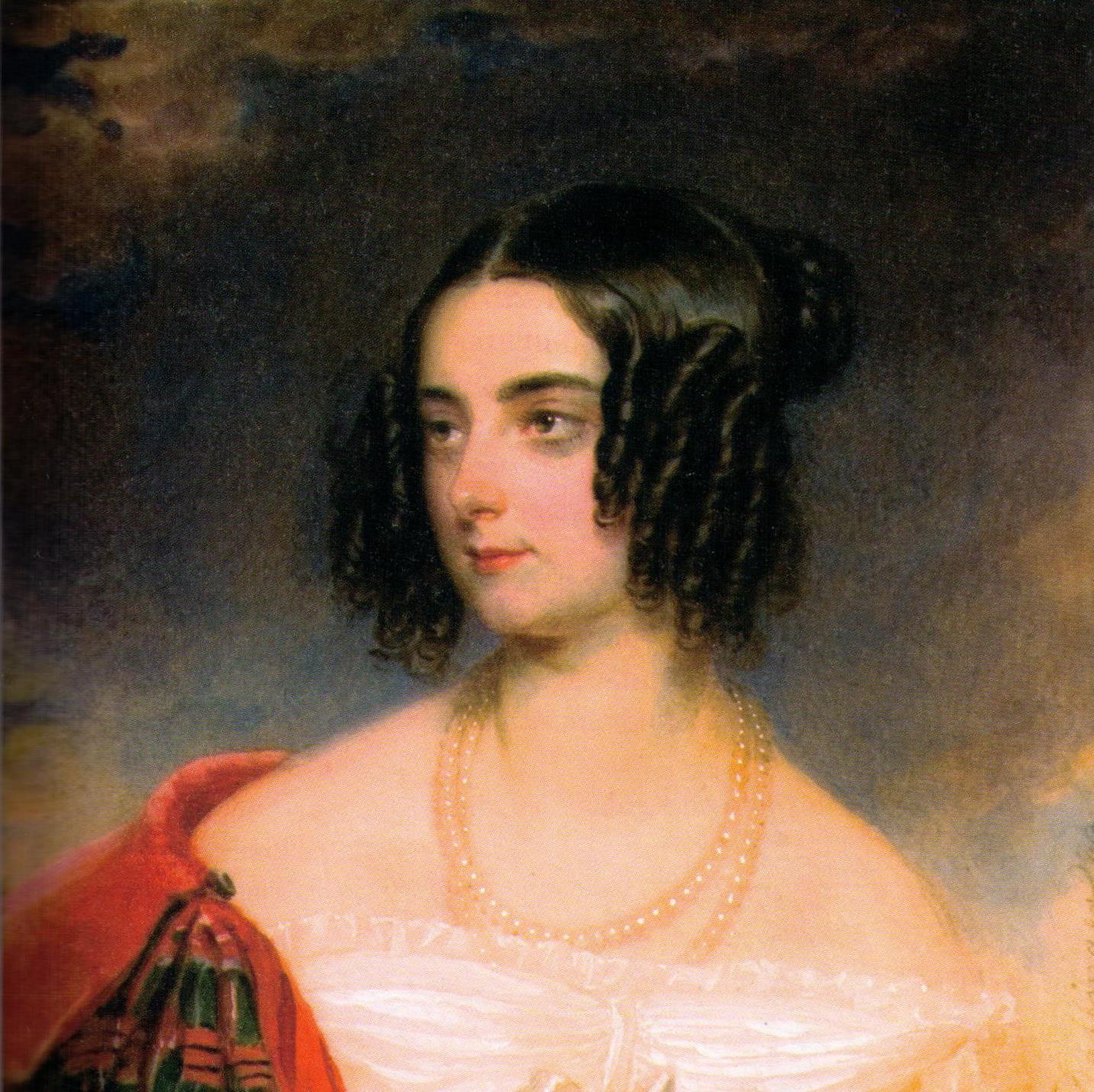
Delfina Potocka, 1830s

Delfina Potocka, née Komar (March 1807 – 2 April 1877), a Polish countess, was a friend and muse to Polish expatriate artists Frédéric Chopin and Zygmunt Krasiński. She was noted for her beauty, intellect and artistic gifts. In her youth she was a piano student of Chopin.

== Life ==
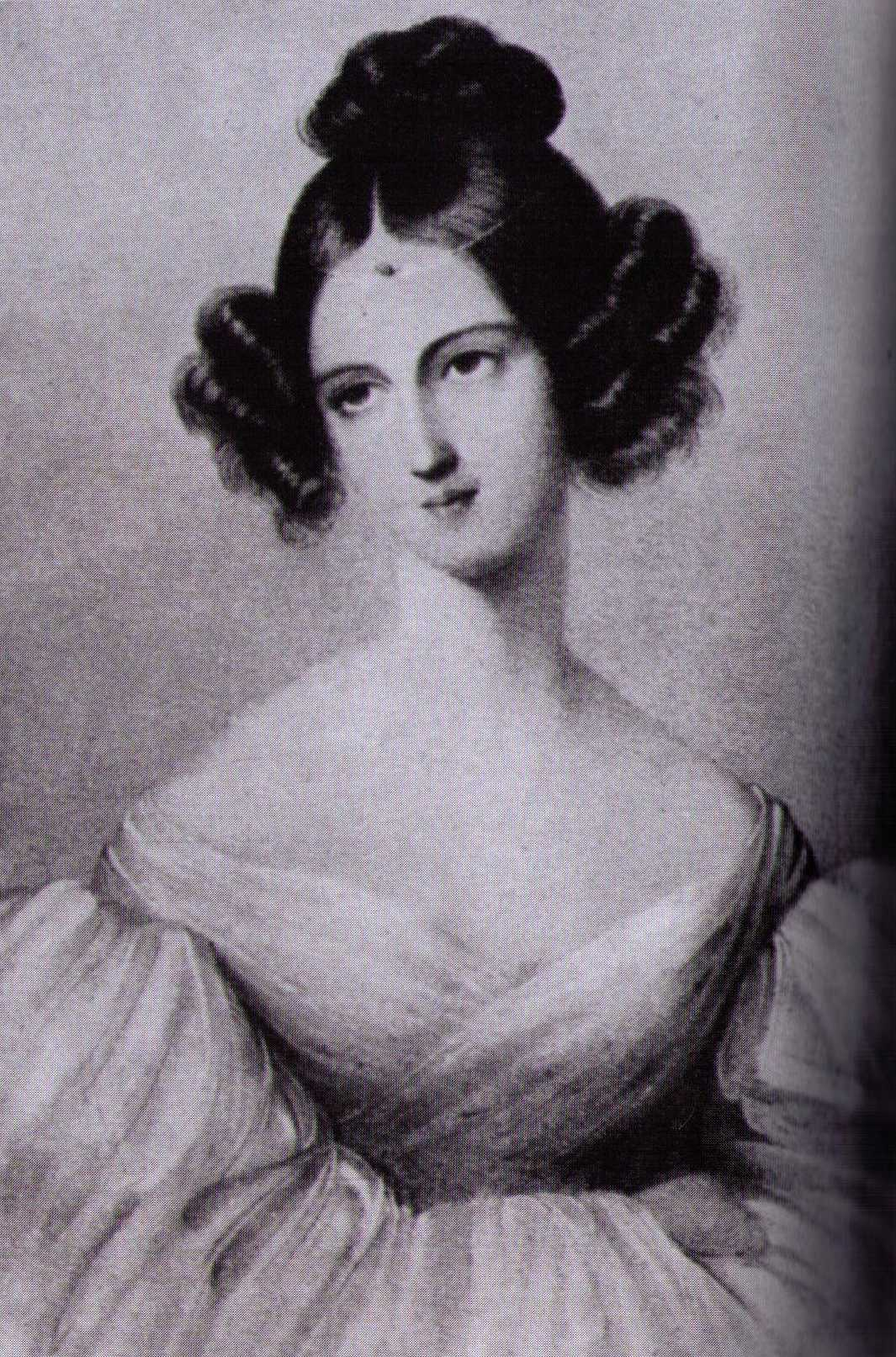
Potocka, 1820s

Delfina Potocka was born in Murowane Kuryłowce, Podolia (now Murovani Kurylivtsi, Murovani Kurylivtsi Raion, Vinnytsia oblast, Ukraine) in March 1807. She was the daughter of Stanisław Komar and Honorata Orłowska. In 1825 she married Count Mieczysław Potocki (thereby becoming a countess), with whom she had two daughters. Unhappy in her married life, she eventually divorced Potocki.

After parting with her husband, Potocka went abroad, where she maintained close contacts with Chopin and with the Polish Romantic poet Count Zygmunt Krasiński. Chopin wrote to a friend in Paris in November 1831: "Yesterday I had dinner at the home of Mrs. Potocka, that pretty wife of Mieczysław". She studied piano with him, and their friendship continued throughout Chopin's life; two days before his death in 1849, at his request, she sang for him an aria from Handel's Dettingen Te Deum. However, the supposed erotic correspondence between Chopin and Potocka ("Fryderyk Chopin's Letters to Delfina Potocka"), which Paulina Czernicka claimed to have discovered in Poland in the 1940s, has been proved a forgery.

Potocka met Krasiński in Naples, Italy, on 24 December 1838 and soon became his beloved confidante, to whom he revealed his innermost thoughts, and for whom he wrote "Sen Cezary" ("Cezara's Dream", published 1840) and the Messianic poem, "Przedświt" ("Predawn", published 1843). Potocka was the great love of Krasiński's life and fully reciprocated his feelings. Their romance lasted to 1846, after which she remained his friend and muse. (In July 1843, Krasiński had married Countess Eliza Branicka.) His letters to Delfina, written between 1839 and 1859, are considered a monument to romantic love.

Potocka's friendships with Chopin and Krasiński are recorded in works that the two artists created in her honor, including poems by Krasiński and Chopin's Waltz in D-flat major, Op. 64 — the "Minute Waltz." Chopin dedicated to her his Piano Concerto in F minor op. 21, the Prelude in A major op.28 n°7, and a Mélodie on a poem by Krasiński.

Potocka died in Paris, France, on 2 April 1877 and is interred at Paris's Montmorency Cemetery.

== See also ==
- List of szlachta
