= Koshtulia =

Village in Vinnytsia Oblast, Ukraine

Koshtulia Коштуля
- Rural settlement
- Location within Vinnytsia Oblast Location within Ukraine Location within Europe
- Coordinates: 48°32′42″N 27°56′41″E
- Country: Ukraine
- Oblast: Vinnytsia Oblast
- Raion: Mohyliv-Podilskyi Raion
- Hromada: Mohyliv-Podilskyi urban hromada
- Established: 1733

Area
  - Total: 0.4 km^{2} (0.15 sq mi)
- Elevation: 237 m (778 ft)

Population
  - Total: 112
- Postal code: 24043
- Area code: 380 4337

Koshtulia (Ukrainian: Коштуля) is a village in the Mohyliv-Podilskyi urban hromada, Mohyliv-Podilskyi Raion, Vinnytsia Oblast, Ukraine. It has a population of 112.

== History ==
On 12 June 2020, on order 707-p of the Cabinet of Ministers of Ukraine "On the order of administrative centers and approval of territories of hromadas of Vinnytsia Oblast", it became a part of the Babchynets rural hromada. On 17 July 2020, following the administrative reform of Ukraine, it ceased to be a part of the Chernivtsi Raion and became part of the Mohyliv-Podilskyi Raion.

== Sources ==
- Kazintsi (1972). History of Cities and Villages of the Ukrainian SSR: in 26 vols. 1972 (in Ukrainian). Vol. Vinnytsia Region. p. 451.
