= Chernigov (disambiguation) =

Chernigov is a city in northern Ukraine.

Chernigov may also refer to:

== Places ==
- Chernigov Oblast, Ukrainian SSR, USSR
- Chernigov electoral district (Russian Constituent Assembly election, 1917)
- Chernigov Governorate, Russian Empire
- Chernigov Regiment, Empire of Russia
- Chernigov Voivodship, Ruthenia, Polish-Lithuanian Commonwealth
- Principality of Chernigov, Kievan Rus

=== Facilities and structures ===
- Chernigov Airport, Chernigov, Ukraine
- Chernigov (air base), Chernigov, Ukraine SSR, USSR

== Other uses ==
- 29th Chernigov Infantry Regiment
- SK Chernigov, Chernigov, Ukraine; a soccer team

== See also ==
- Chernigov Province (disambiguation)
- Chernihiv (disambiguation)
