= Heinrich Bresnitz =

Austrian author and journalist

- Born: 12 November 1843; Czernowitz, Bukowina, Austrian Empire
- Died: 4 February 1915 (aged 70); Vienna, Austria
- Occupations: Journalist, editor
- Writing career
- Language: German

Heinrich Bresnitz (12 November 1843 – 4 February 1915) was an Austrian author and journalist.

Bresnitz was born in Czernowitz, Bukowina, and established himself as a journalist and editor in Vienna. There he founded in 1867 a periodical, Der Osten, and in 1869 a political journal, Der Patriot. From 1879 to 1886 he was the proprietor and chief editor of the Morgen-Post. He also anonymously published a number of political pamphlets. In 1893, Bresnitz moved to Bulgaria.

He died in 1915 in Vienna.

== Publications ==
- Die Verfassungspartei und das Ministerium Hohenwart: eine politische Studie. Vienna: G. J. Manz. 1871.
- Betrachtungen über den Ausgleich. Vienna: G. J. Manz. 1871.
