= Nove Zhyttia =

Nova Zhyttia Нове Життя
- Village
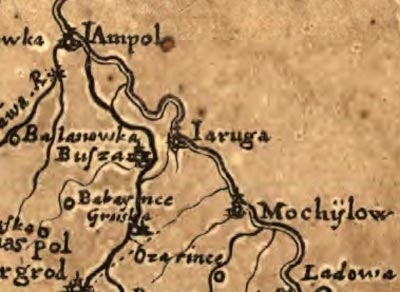
- Beauplan's 1648 map showing the Nove Zhyttia area

- Location within Vinnytsia Oblast Location within Ukraine
- Coordinates: 48°22′30″N 28°10′21″E
- Country: Ukraine
- Oblast: Vinnytsia Oblast
- Raion: Mohyliv-Podilskyi Raion
- Hromada: Babchyntsi rural hromada

Nove Zhyttia (Ukrainian: Нове Життя) is a village in Mohyliv-Podilskyi Raion of Vinnytsia Oblast in southern Ukraine, near the Moldovian border.
