= Chernihiv (disambiguation) =

Chernihiv is a city in northern Ukraine, capital of the eponymous district and province

Chernihiv may also refer to:

== Places ==
- Chernihiv Raion, a district in Chernihiv Oblast, Ukraine
- Chernihiv Oblast, a province in Ukraine
- Chernihiv Okruha (early 20th-century), a district in Chernihiv Governorate, People's Republic of Ukraine
- Chernihiv Governorate (early 20th-century), a prefecture of the People's Republic of Ukraine
- Chernihiv Regiment, a commandery territory of the Empire of Russia
- Chernihiv Voivodeship, a province of Ruthenia, Poland-Lithuania
- Grand Principality of Chernihiv, Kievan Rus

=== Facilities and structures ===
- Chernihiv Airport, Chernihiv, Ukraine
- Chernihiv Air Base, Chernihiv, Ukraine
- Chernihiv railway station, Chernihiv, Ukraine
- Chernihiv Central Bus Station, Chernihiv, Ukraine
- Chernihiv Stadium, Chernihiv, Ukraine; a multipurpose stadium
- Chernihiv Arena, Chernihiv, Ukraine; a soccer stadium
- Chernihiv Philharmony, Chernihiv, Ukraine; a Philharmony
- Chernihiv Bus Factory, Chernihiv, Ukraine; a company

== Ships ==
- Ukrainian corvette Chernihiv, a Soviet and then Ukrainian Navy ship
- Ukrainian minesweeper Chernihiv, a Soviet then Ukrainian then Crimean Navy ship
- Chernihiv, a British ship transferred to the Ukrainian Navy in 2023

== Sports ==
- BC Chernihiv, Chernihiv, Chernihiv, Chernihiv, Ukraine; a basketball team
- FC Desna Chernihiv, Chernihiv, Chernihiv, Chernihiv, Ukraine; a soccer team
- FC Chernihiv, Chernihiv, Chernihiv, Chernihiv, Ukraine; a soccer team
- FC Yunist Chernihiv, Chernihiv, Chernihiv, Chernihiv, Ukraine; a soccer youth team
- FC Desna-2 Chernihiv, Chernihiv, Chernihiv, Chernihiv, Ukraine; a soccer youth under 21 team
- FC Desna-3 Chernihiv, Chernihiv, Chernihiv, Chernihiv, Ukraine; a soccer youth under 19 team

== Other uses ==
- Siege of Chernihiv (2022), during the Russian invasion of Ukraine

== See also ==
- Ancient Chernihiv, an architectural park in Chernihiv, Ukraine
- Chernihiv Polytechnic National University, Chernihiv, Ukraine
- Chernivtsi (disambiguation)
- Chernigov (disambiguation)
