= Chernivtsi Raion (disambiguation) =

Chernivtsi Raion is a raion (district) of Chernivtsi Oblast, Ukraine, formed in 2020.

Chernivtsi Raion (English: Chernivtsi District) can also refer to:

- Chernivtsi Raion, Vinnytsia Oblast, a former raion (district) of Vinnytsia Oblast, abolished in 2020

== See also ==
- Chernivtsi District (1775–1849), Galicia and Lodomeria, Hapsburg Empire
