= Vilne =

Vilne may refer to the following places in Ukraine:

Crimea

- Vilne, Dzhankoi Raion, urban-type settlement in Dzhankoi Raion

Vinnytsia Oblast

- Vilne, Vinnytsia Oblast, village in Mohyliv-Podilskyi Raion

It is also an alternate spelling of Vilna, the Yiddish name for Vilnius in Lithuania.
