= Murovani Kurylivtsi Raion =

Former subdivision of Vinnytsia Oblast, Ukraine

Murovani Kurylivtsi Raion Мурованокуриловецький район
- Raion
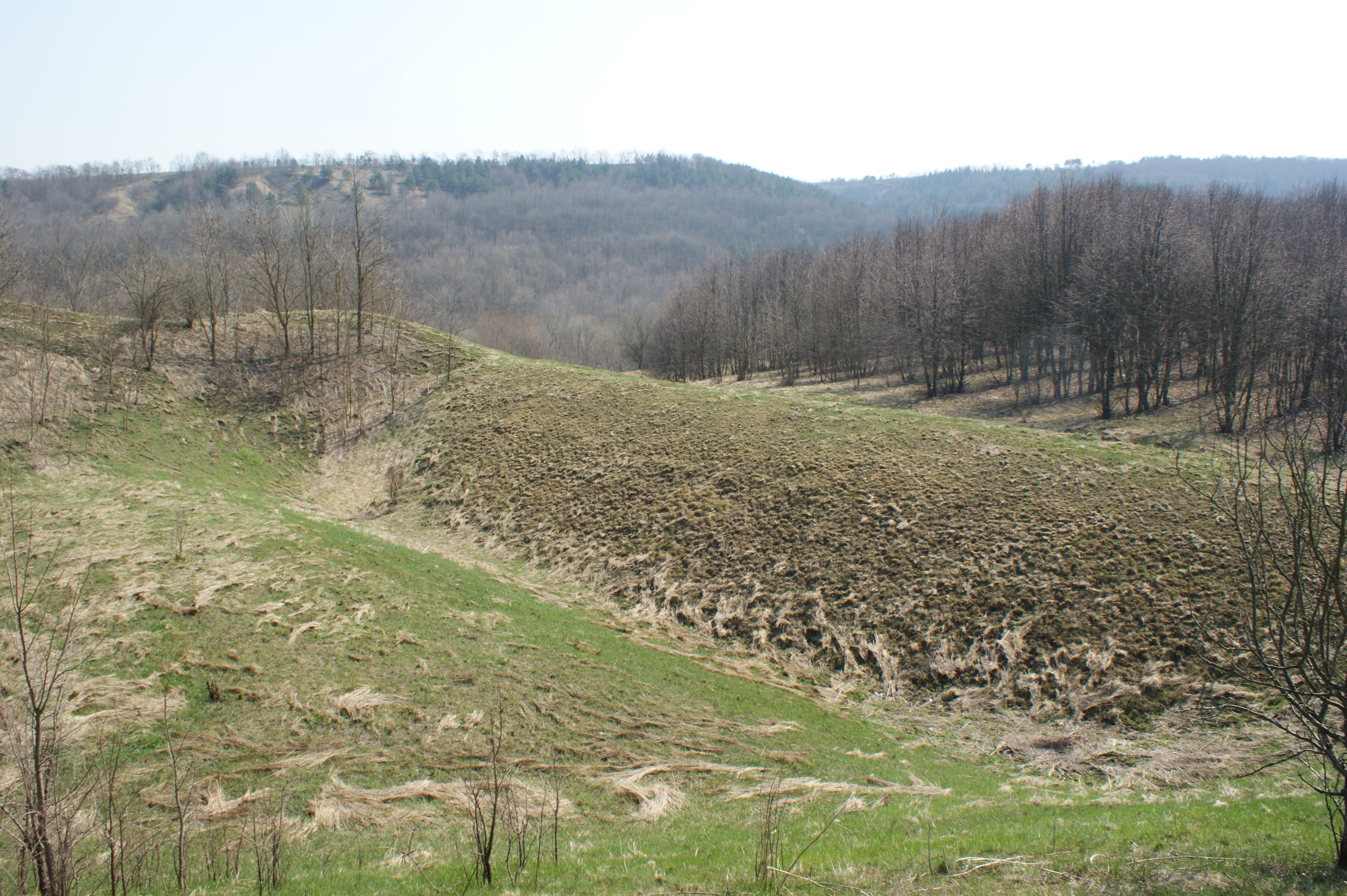

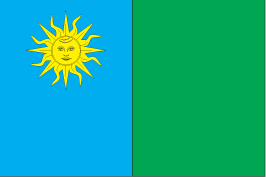
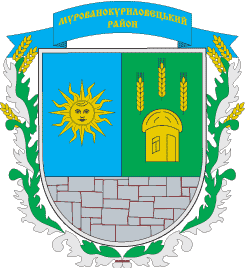
- Flag Coat of arms

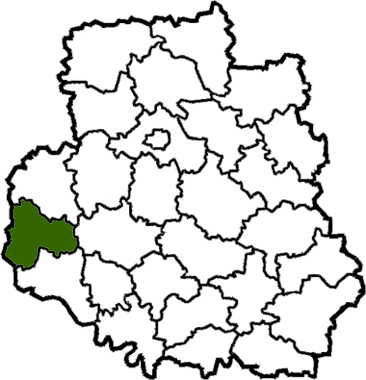
- Coordinates: 48°43′14.3076″N 27°31′12.1326″E
- Country: Ukraine
- Oblast: Vinnytsia Oblast
- Established: 31 January 1923
- Disestablished: 18 July 2020
- Admin. center: Murovani Kurylivtsi
- Subdivisions: List: 0 — city councils; 1 — settlement councils; 24 — rural councils; Number of localities: 0 — cities; 1 — urban-type settlements; 51 — villages; — rural settlements

Government
  - Governor: Volodymyr Anikeyenko

Area
  - Total: 890 km^{2} (340 sq mi)

Population (2020)
  - Total: 23,971 ▼
  - Density: 27/km^{2} (70/sq mi)
- Time zone: UTC+02:00 (EET)
  - Summer (DST): UTC+03:00 (EEST)
- Postal index: 22500—22555
- Area code: +380 4356
- Website: http://mkrda.at.ua

Murovani Kurylivtsi Raion (Ukrainian: Мурованокуриловецький район) was one of raions of Vinnytsia Oblast, located in southwestern Ukraine. The administrative center of the raion was the urban-type settlement of Murovani Kurylivtsi. The raion was abolished on 18 July 2020 as part of the administrative reform of Ukraine, which reduced the number of raions of Vinnytsia Oblast to six. The area of Murovani Kurylivtsi Raion was merged into Mohyliv-Podilskyi Raion. The last estimate of the raion population was 23,971 (2020 est.).

== History ==
The area historically was a part of the Kingdom of Poland. Murovani Kurylivtsi is first mentioned in 1453. In 1793, after the Second Partition of Poland, it was transferred to the Russian Empire. In Russia, it was a part of Ushitsky Uyezd of Podolia Governorate. On January 31, 1923 uyezds were abolished. The Ukrainian Soviet Socialist Republic was established, and Murovani Kurylivtsi became the administrative center of the newly established Murovani Kurylivtsi Raion, which was a part of Mohyliv-Podilskyi Okruha. In 1925, the governorate was abolished, and okruhas were directly subordinated to Ukrainian SSR. In 1930, okruhas were abolished as well, and on February 27, 1932 Vinnytsia Oblast was established. In 1962, the raion was abolished, and in 1966, it was re-established. In 1991, the Soviet Union was abolished, and Murovani Kurylivtsi became a part of independent Ukraine.
