= Murovani Kurylivtsi =

Rural locality in Vinnytsia Oblast, Ukraine

Murovani Kurylivtsi Муровані Курилівці
- Rural settlement
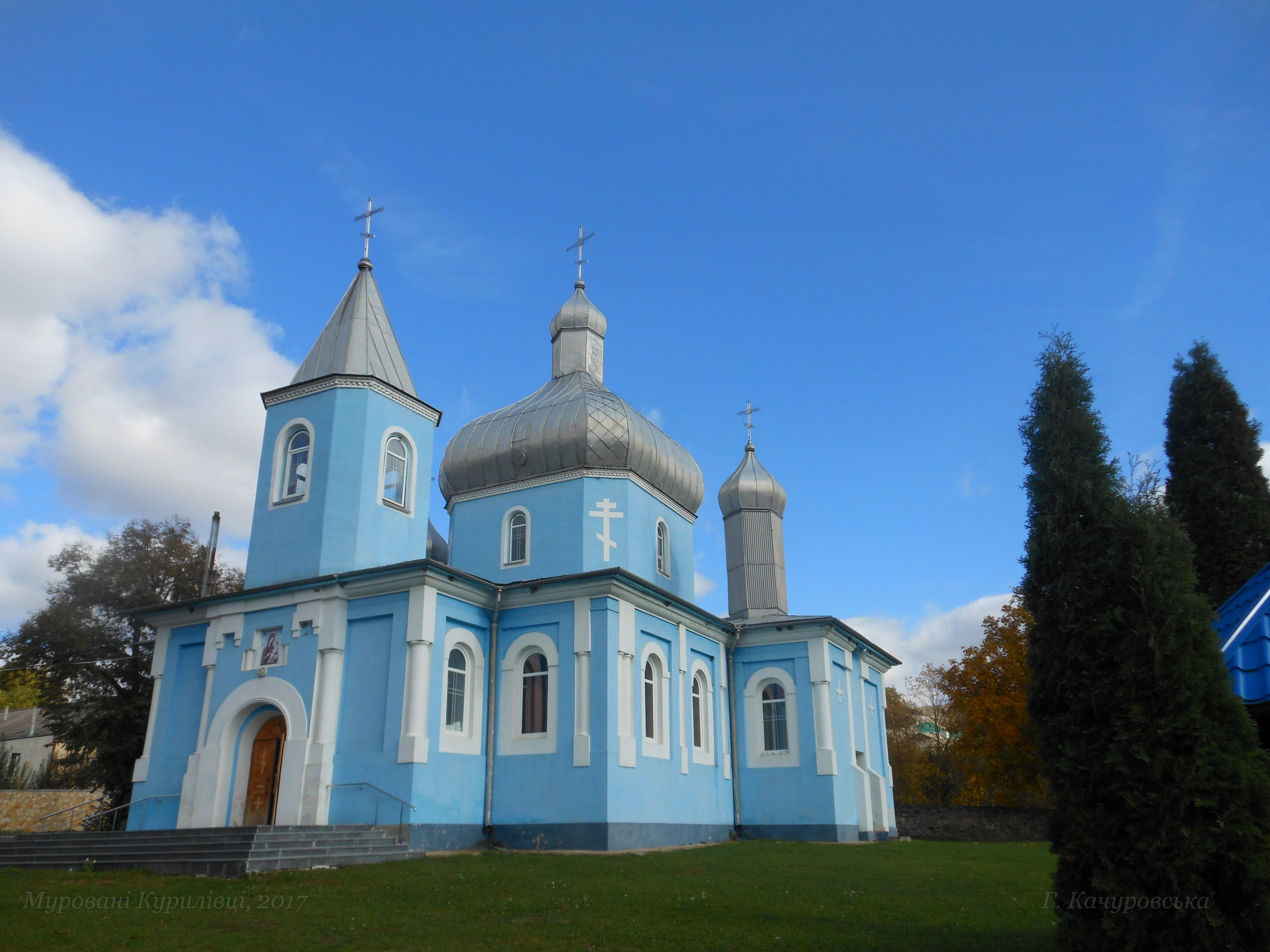
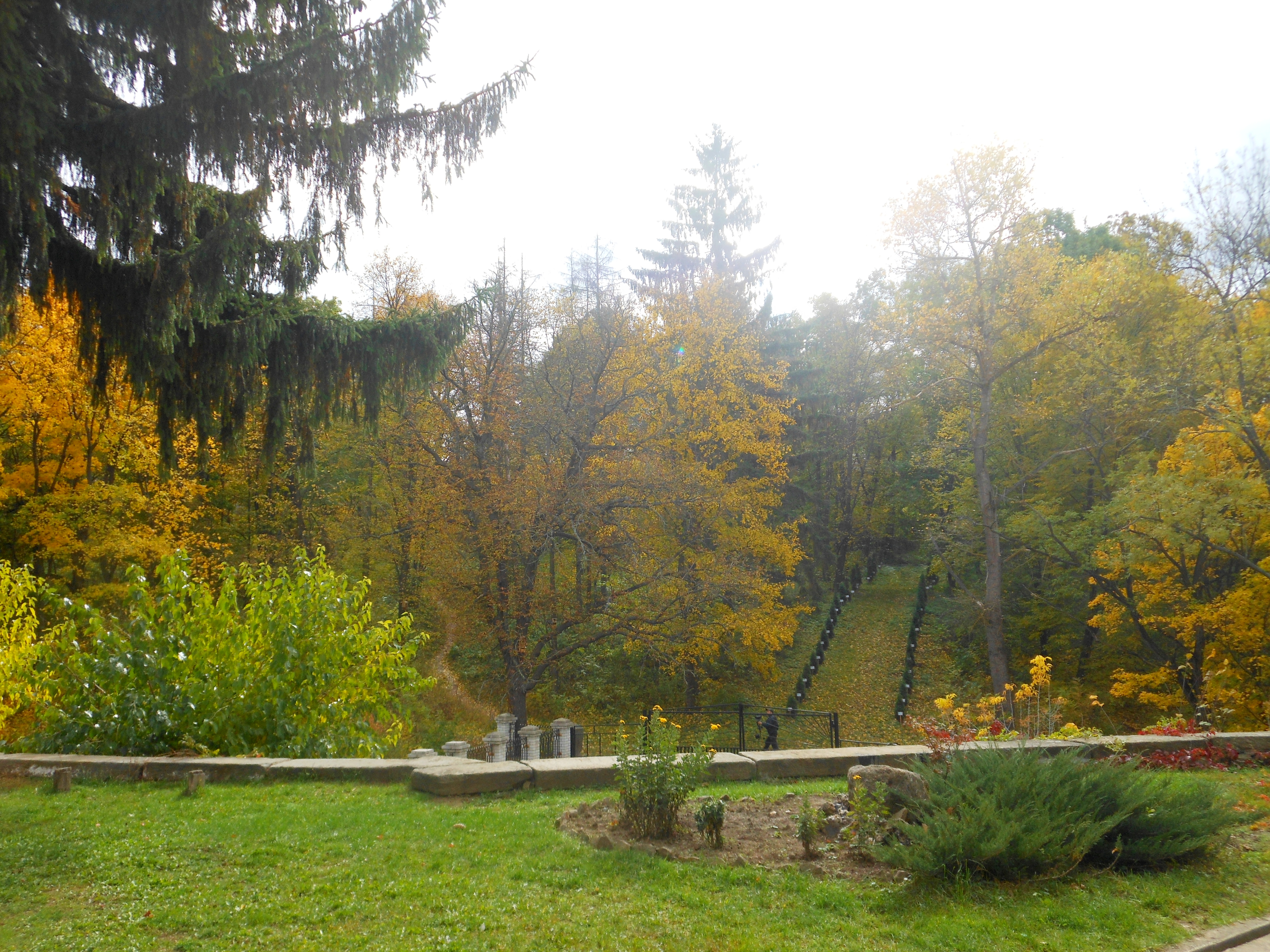
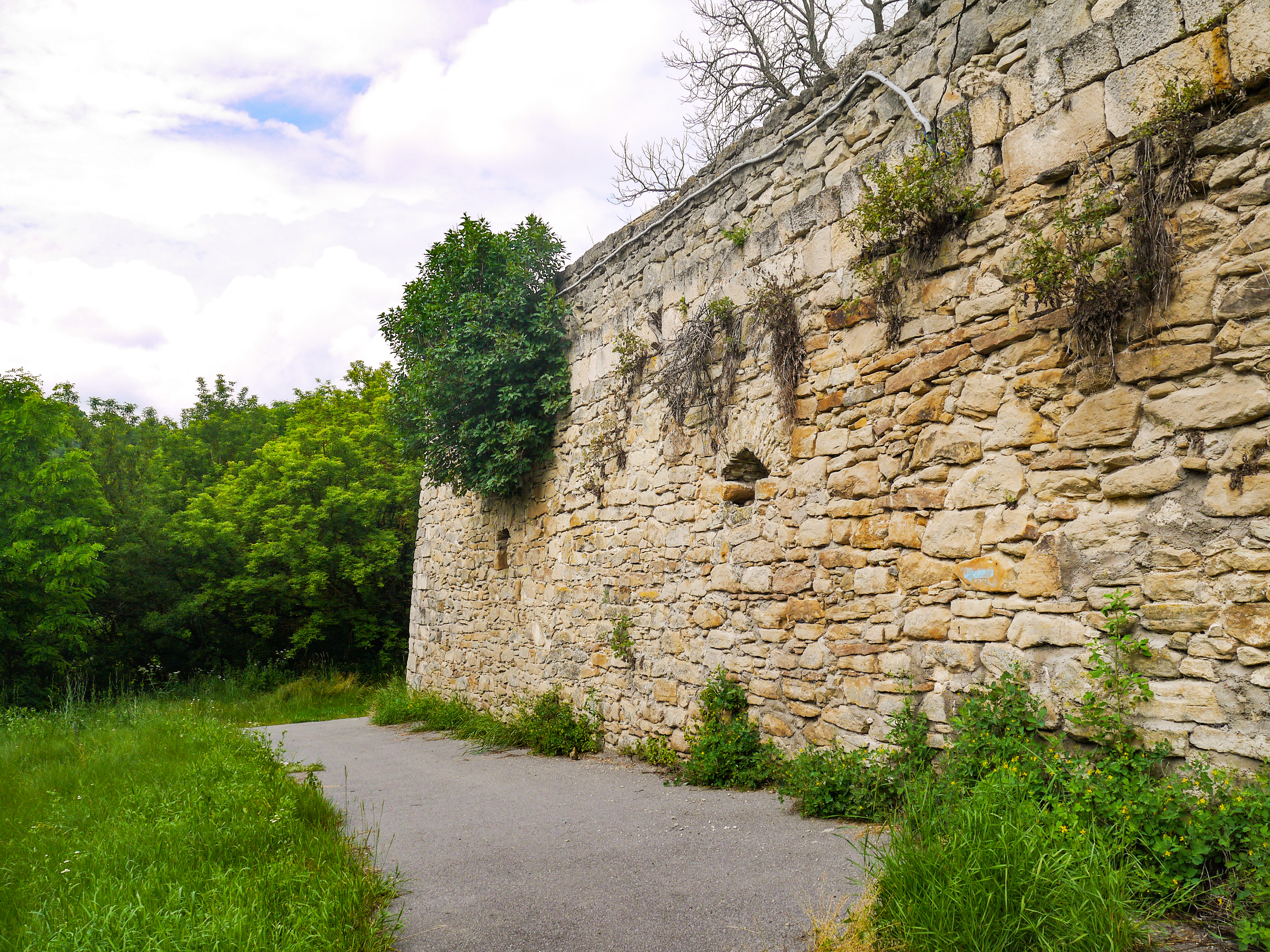
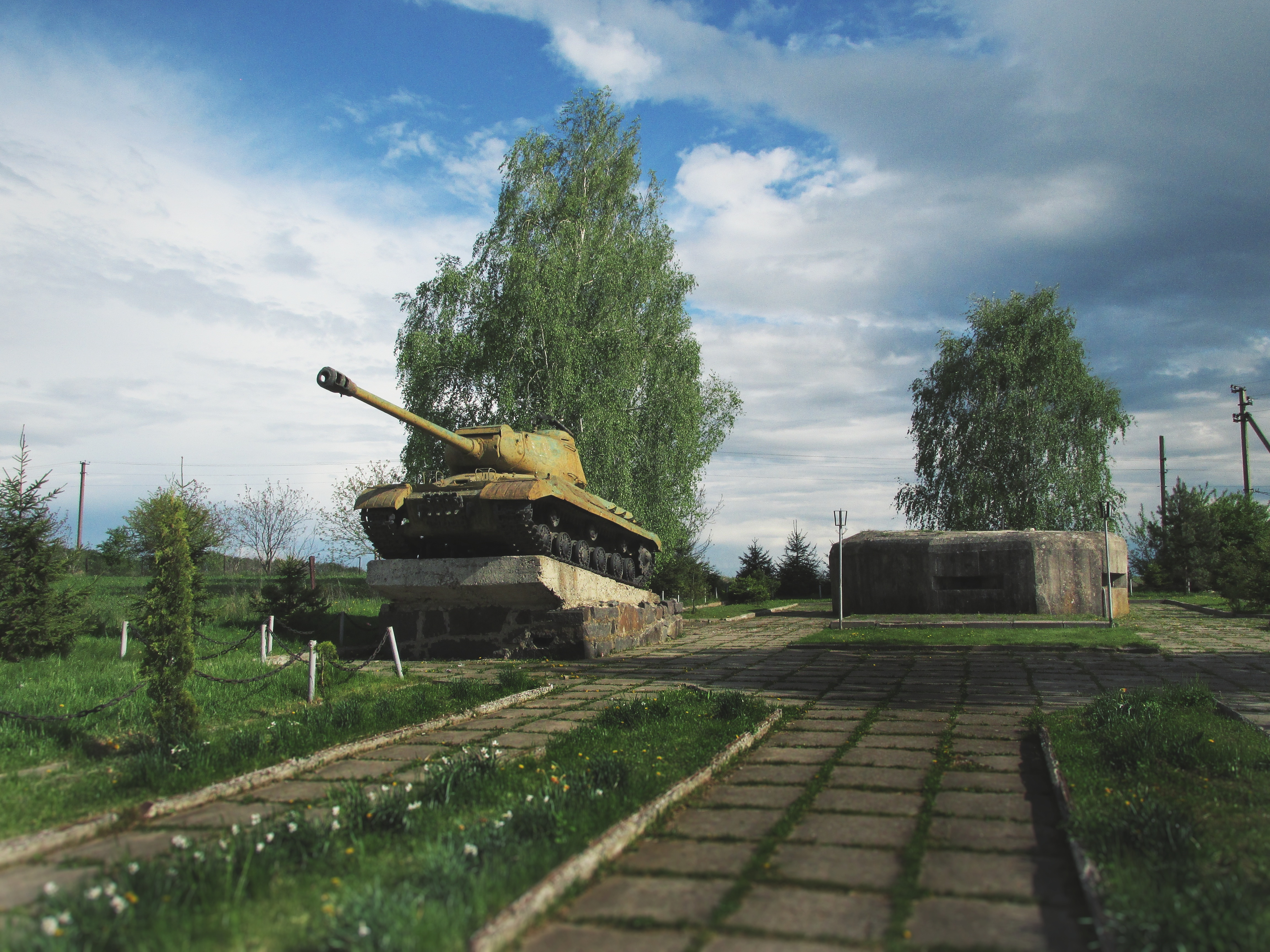
- From top left, clockwise: Church of the Nativity of the Theotokos; Zhvan Park; Monument to Soldiers-Liberators; Churyliv Castle

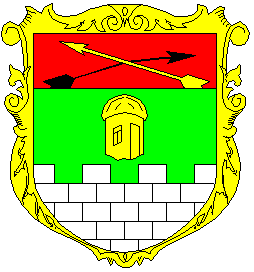
- Coat of arms

- Location within Vinnytsia Oblast Location within Ukraine
- Coordinates: 48°43′14″N 27°31′12″E
- Country: Ukraine
- Oblast: Vinnytsia Oblast
- Raion: Mohyliv-Podilskyi Raion
- Hromada: Murovani Kurylivtsi settlement hromada
- First mention: 1453

Population (2022)
  - Total: 5,632
- Time zone: UTC+2 (EET)
  - Summer (DST): UTC+3 (EEST)

Murovani Kurylivtsi (Ukrainian: Муровані Курилівці, Polish: Murowane Kuryłowce) is a rural settlement in the southwestern part of Vinnytsia Oblast, Ukraine. It was formerly the administrative center of Murovani Kurylivtsi Raion, but is now administered within Mohyliv-Podilskyi Raion. Murovani Kurylivtsi is located on the banks of the Zhvan River, a left tributary of the Dniester River, in the historic region of Podolia. Population: 5,632 (2022 estimate)

== History ==
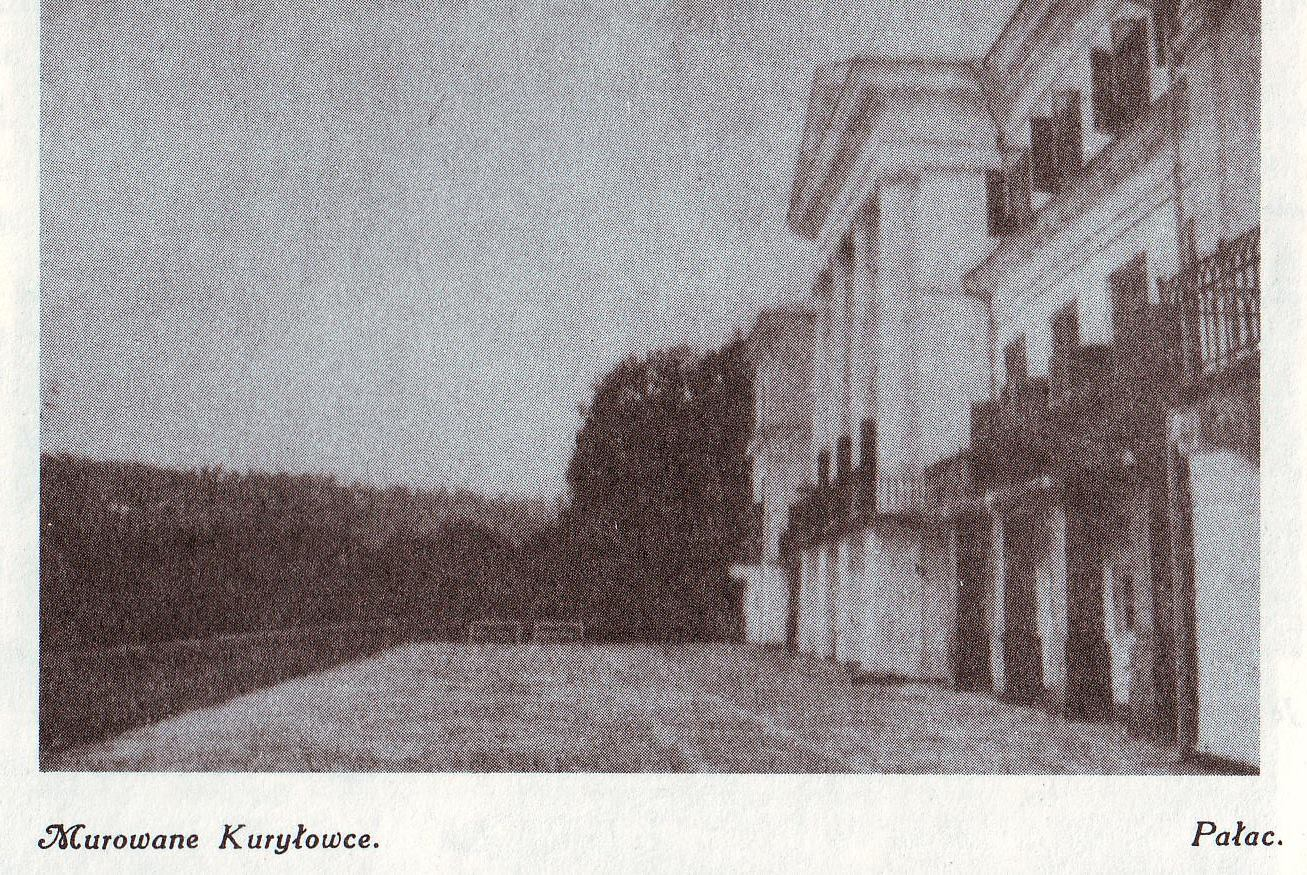
Palace in Murovani Kurylivtsi

The village of Churylivtsi was first mentioned in 1453. It was a part of the Kingdom of Poland and belonged to various Polish noble families, since the 17th century to the family of Kossakowski. It was located in the Podolian Voivodeship of the Lesser Poland Province of the Polish Crown. In 1793, after the Second Partition of Poland, the whole area was transferred to the Russian Empire. In Russia, it was a part of Ushitsa uezd of Podolia Governorate. On January 31, 1923 the uezds were abolished. The Ukrainian Soviet Socialist Republic was established, and Murovani Kurylivtsi became the administrative center of the newly established Murovani Kurylivtsi Raion, which was a part of Mohyliv-Podilskyi Okruha. In 1925, the governorate was abolished, and okruhas were directly subordinated to Ukrainian SSR. In 1930, okruhas were abolished as well, and on February 27, 1932 Vinnytsia Oblast was established. In 1991, the Soviet Union was abolished, and Murovani Kurylivtsi became a part of independent Ukraine.

Until 26 January 2024, Murovani Kurylivtsi was designated urban-type settlement. On this day, a new law entered into force which abolished this status, and Murovani Kurylivtsi became a rural settlement.

== Economy ==
=== Transportation ===
Murovani Kurylivtsi is built into a dense road network of Ukraine and is connected by road with Mohyliv-Podilskyi, Zhmerynka, Bar, Vendychany, and Nova Ushytsia.

There is regular bus traffic connecting Murovani Kurylivtsi with Vinnytsia and with Mohyliv-Podilskyi, as well as local bus traffic around the district.

== Culture and recreation ==
One notable location is the classicist palace of Komari that was built in the 18th century and the landscape park around it.

== Gallery ==
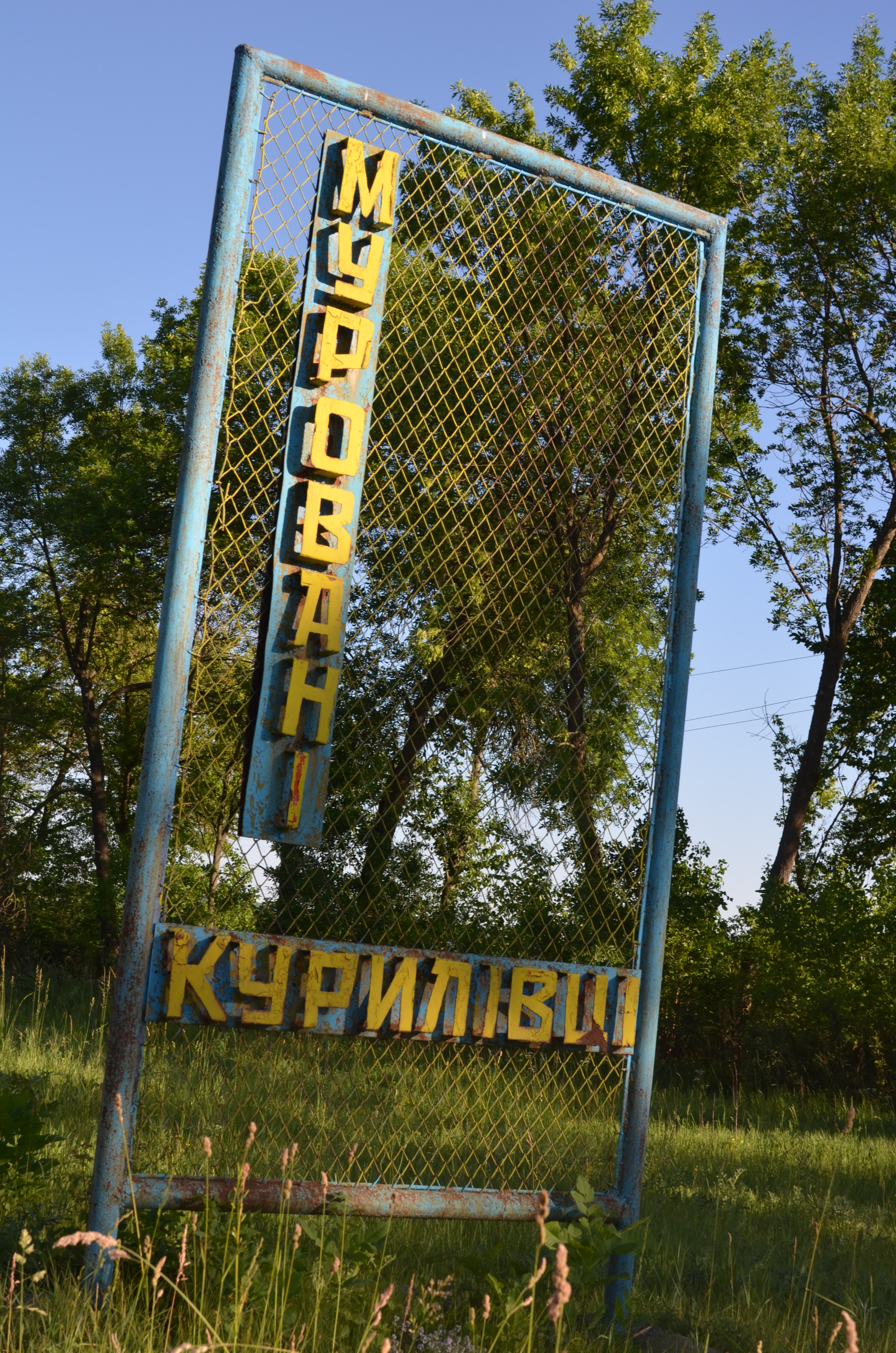
Sign at the entrance of Murovani Kurylivtsi

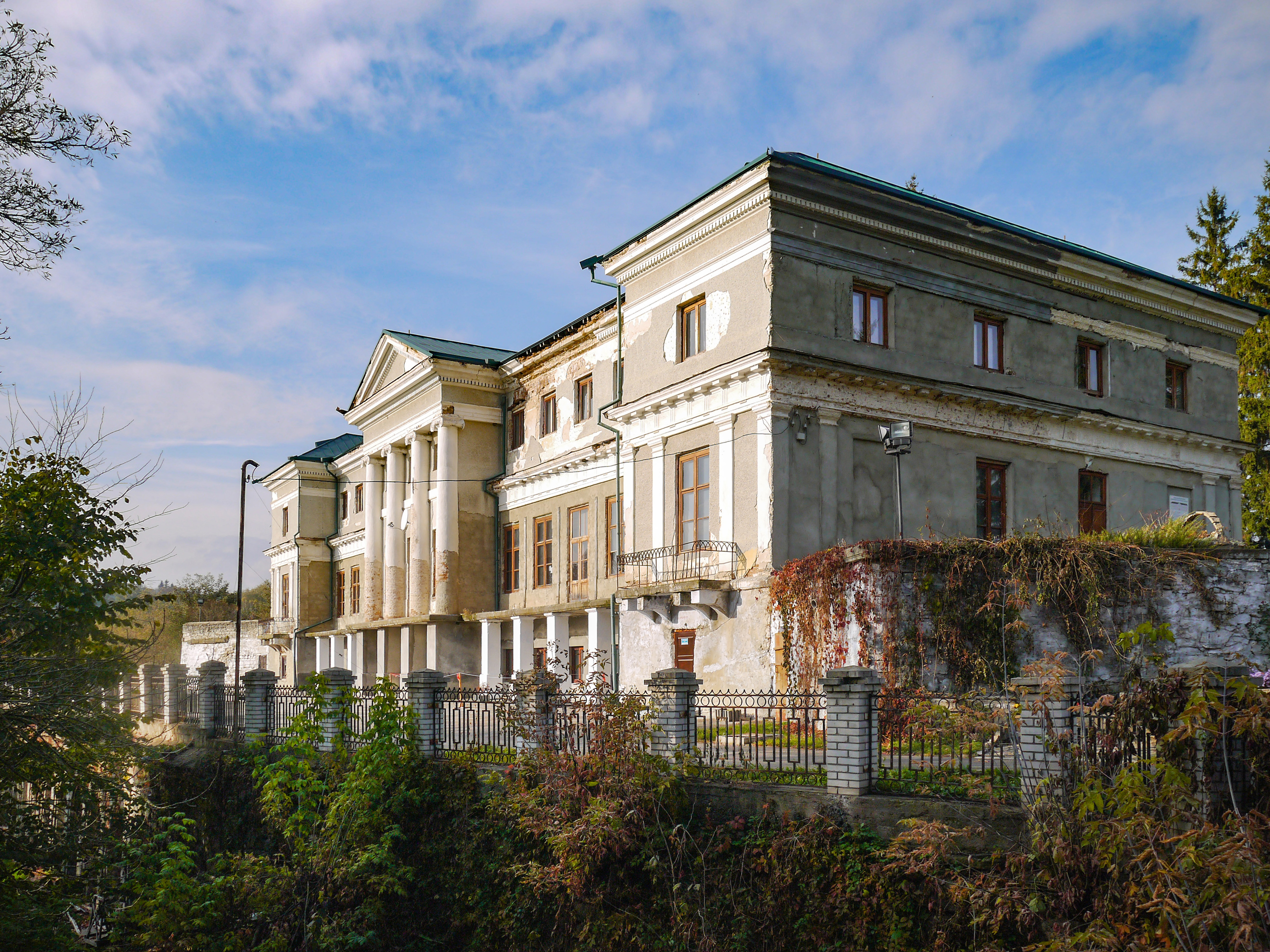
Palace

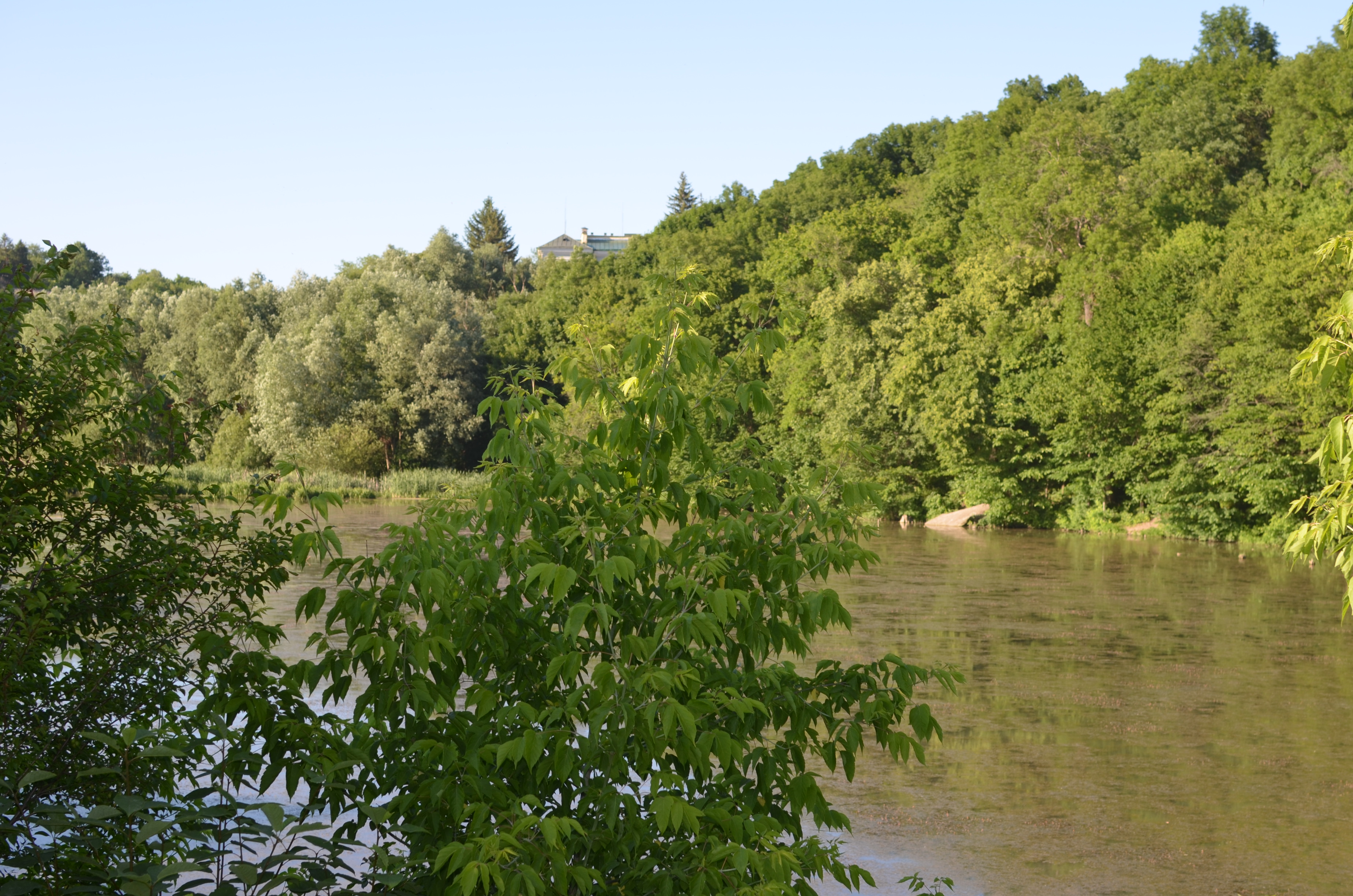
Zhvan River

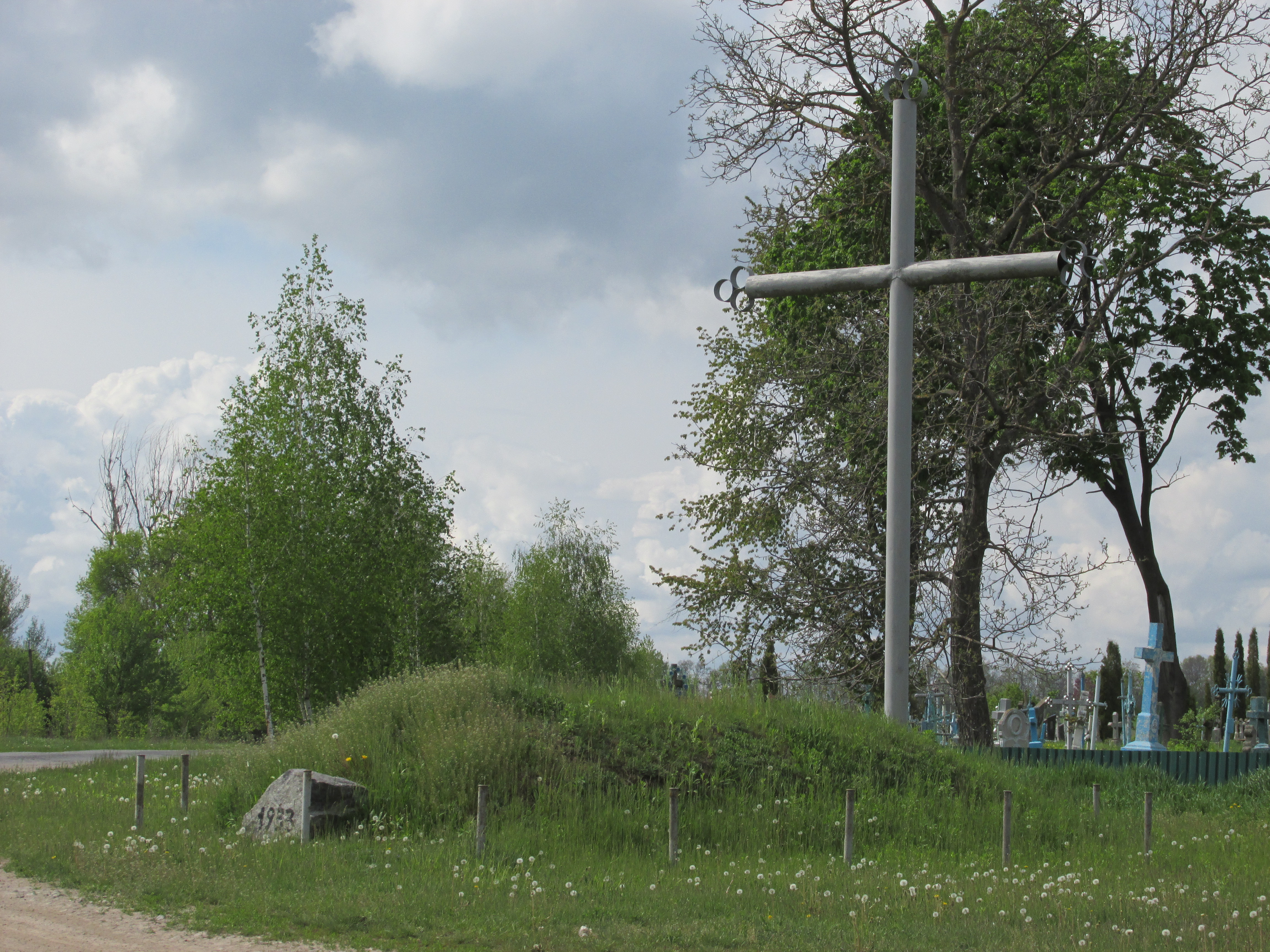
Monument to victims of Holodomor

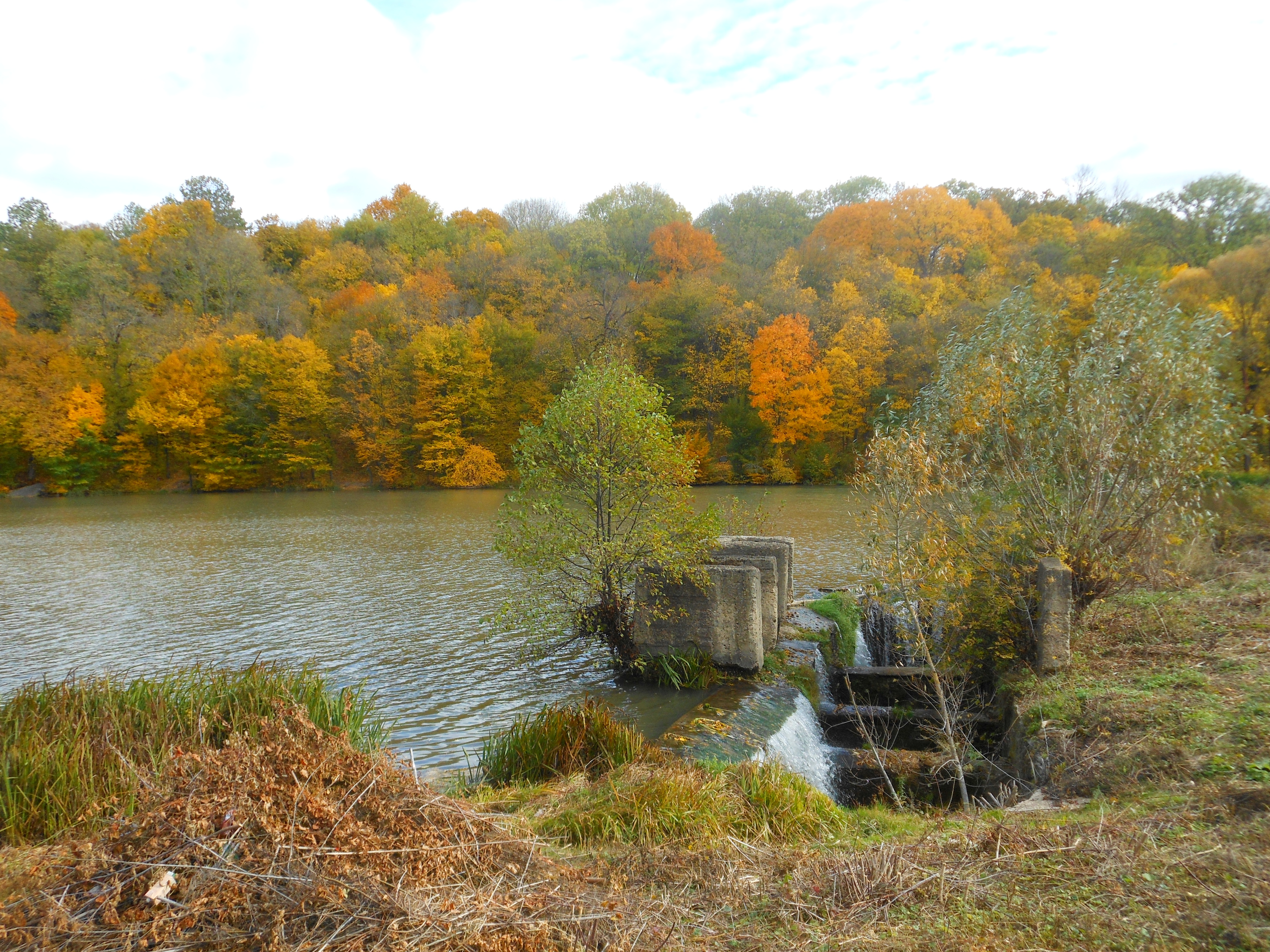
Zhvan Park

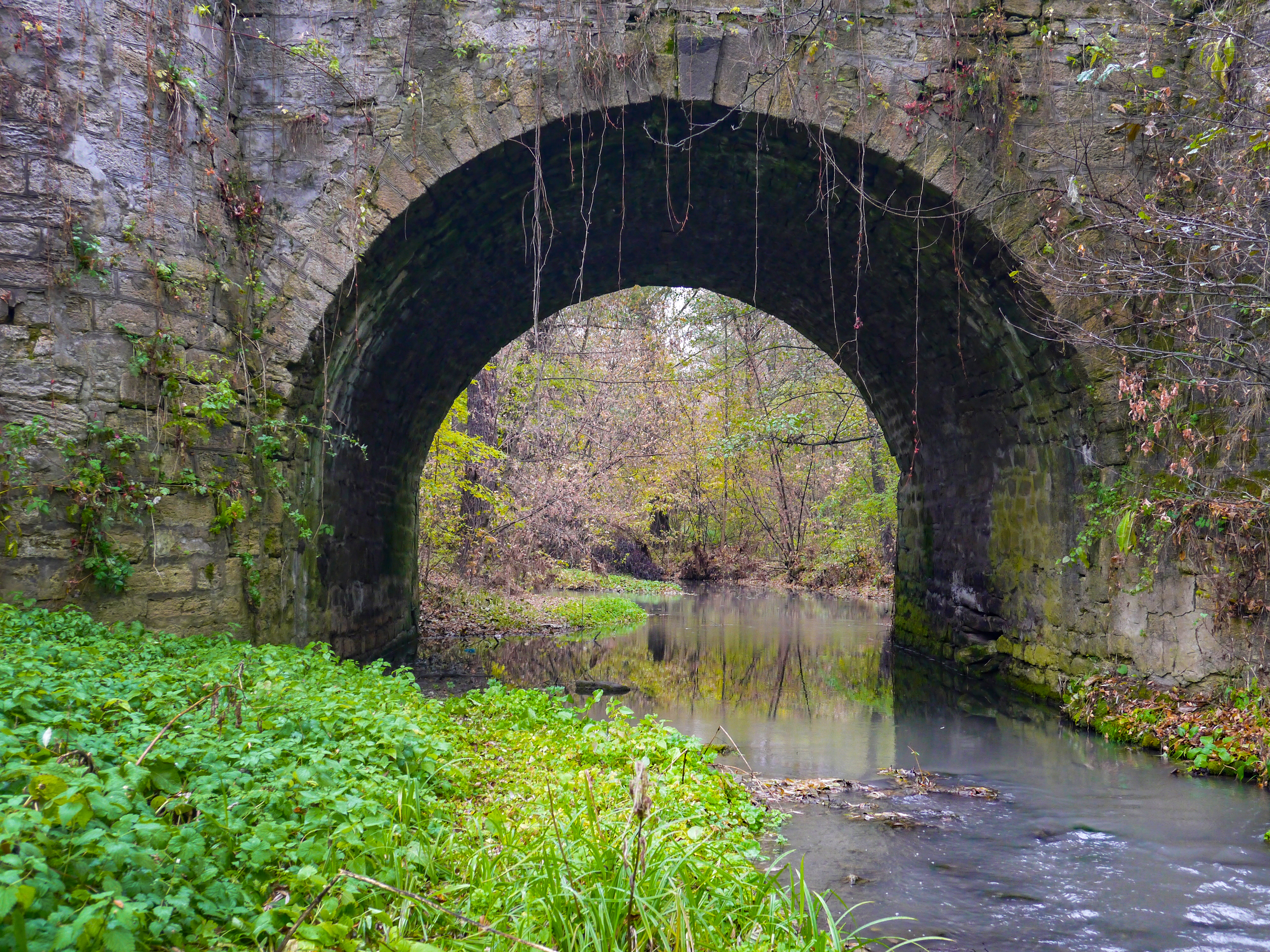
Old bridge
