= Sloboda-Bushanska =

Rural settlement in Vinnytsia Oblast, Ukraine

Sloboda-Bushanska Слобода-Бушанська
- Rural settlement
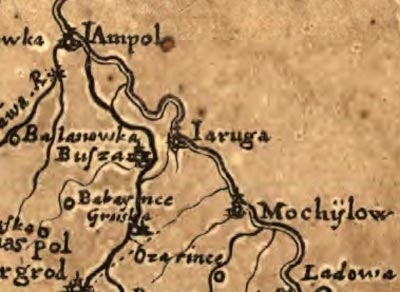
- Beauplan's map from 1648 showing Bushanska area(South is up)

- Location within Vinnytsia Oblast Location within Ukraine
- Coordinates: 48.3475°N 28.09°E
- Country: Ukraine
- Oblast: Vinnytsia Oblast
- Raion: Mohyliv-Podilskyi Raion
- Time zone: UTC+2 (EET)
  - Summer (DST): UTC+3 (EEST)

Sloboda-Bushanska (Ukrainian: Слобода-Бушанська) is a rural settlement in Vinnytsia Oblast, Ukraine located at 48°21N 28°05E. It is located in the Mohyliv-Podilskyi Raion, located adjacent to the Dniester river it is generally cold and temperate. In Sloboda-Bushanska the average temperature is 9.0 °C and average annual rainfall is 592mm. although June and July are the warmest and wettest months. It is also the site of a small power station.
