= Vilne, Vinnytsia Oblast =

Vilne Вільне
- Village
- Location of Vilne Vilne (Ukraine)
- Coordinates: 48°30′9″N 27°58′36″E
- Country: Ukraine
- Oblast: Vinnytsia Oblast
- Raion: Mohyliv-Podilskyi Raion
- Hromada: Mohyliv-Podilskyi urban hromada
- Elevation: 219 m (719 ft)

Population (2001)
  - Total: 78
- Time zone: UTC+4 (MSK)
- Postal code: 24094
- Area code: +380 4337

Vilne (Ukrainian: Вільне) is a village in the Mohyliv-Podilskyi Raion of Vinnytsia Oblast, Ukraine. It belongs to the Mohyliv-Podilskyi urban hromada.

== History ==
On June 12, 2022, Order by the Cabinet of Ministers No. 707-p "On the defining of administrative centers and approval of territorial communities of the Vinnytsia Oblast", Vilne maintained its position in the boundaries of the Mohyliv-Podilskyi Raion as the Raion expanded its boundaries.

== Demographics ==
Native language as of the Ukrainian Census of 2001:

- Ukrainian 100%
