= Chernivtsi, Vinnytsia Oblast =

Rural locality in Vinnytsia Oblast, Ukraine

Chernivtsi
- Rural settlement
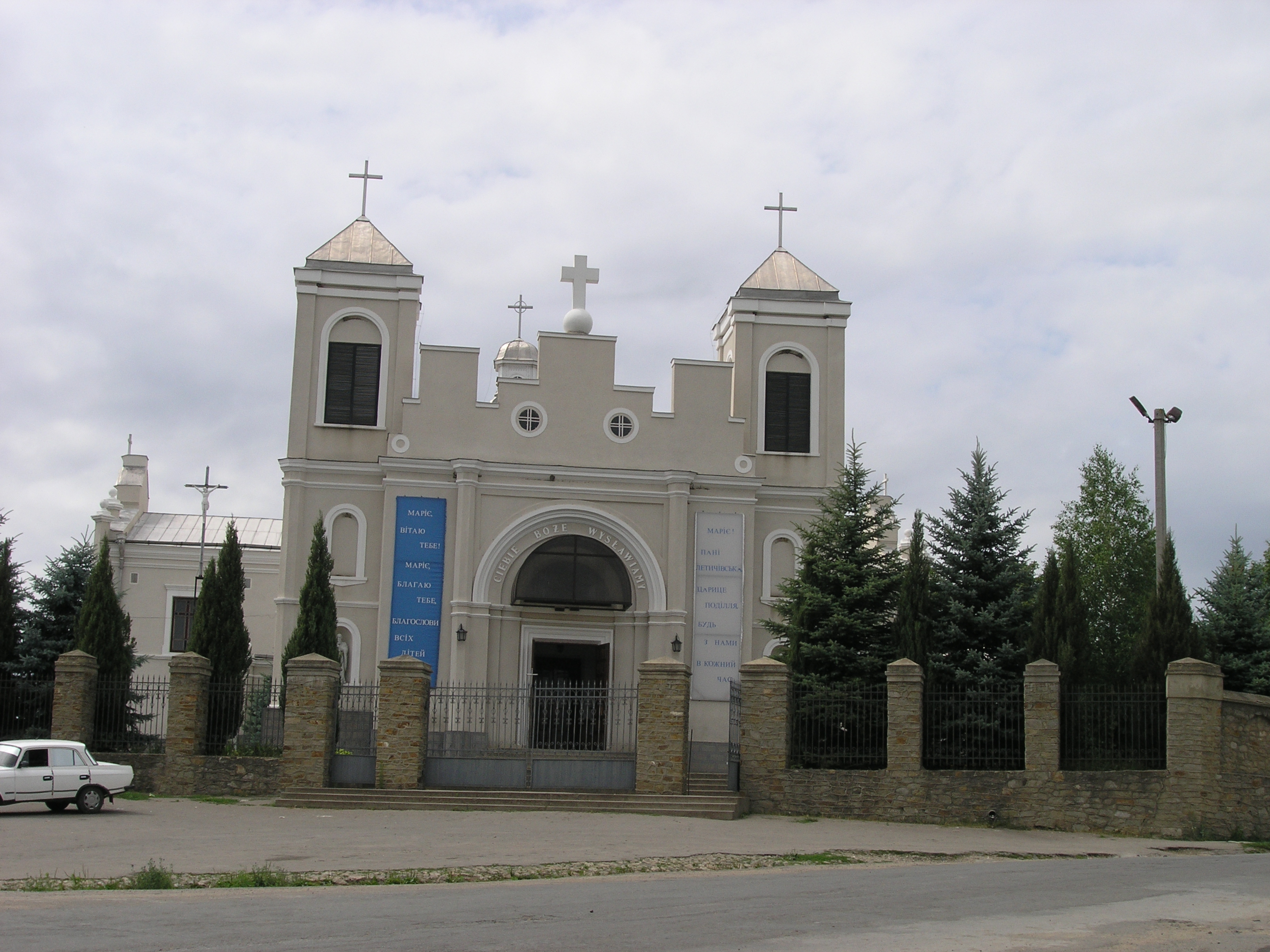
- St. Nicholas' Catholic church

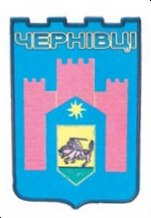
- Coat of arms

- Location within Vinnytsia Oblast Location within Ukraine
- Coordinates: 48.5425°N 28.1122°E
- Country: Ukraine
- Oblast: Vinnytsia Oblast
- District: Mohyliv-Podilskyi Raion
- First mentioned: 1392

Population (2022)
  - Total: 2,483
- Time zone: UTC+2 (EET)
  - Summer (DST): UTC+3 (EEST)

Chernivtsi is a rural settlement in Vinnytsia Oblast, located in the historic region of Podolia. It was formerly the administrative center of Chernivtsi Raion, and is now administrated under Mohyliv-Podilskyi Raion. Population: 2,483 (2022 estimate).

== History ==
Until the Partitions of Poland Czerniejowce (or Czernijowce) was a private town of Poland, located in the Lesser Poland Province of the Polish Crown, owned by the houses of Koniecpolski and Lubomirski.

Until 26 January 2024, Chernivtsi was designated urban-type settlement. On this day, a new law entered into force which abolished this status, and Chernivtsi became a rural settlement.
