= Vendychany =

Rural locality in Vinnytsia Oblast, Ukraine

Vendychany Вендичани
- Rural settlement
- Location in Vinnytsia Oblast Location in Ukraine
- Country: Ukraine
- Oblast: Vinnytsia Oblast
- Raion: Mohyliv-Podilskyi Raion
- Hromada: Vedychany settlement hromada

Population (2022)
  - Total: 3,652
- Time zone: UTC+2 (EET)
  - Summer (DST): UTC+3 (EEST)

Vendychany (Ukrainian: Вендичани) is a rural settlement in Mohyliv-Podilskyi Raion of Vinnytsia Oblast in Ukraine. It is located in the steppe about 100 kilometres (62 mi) southwest of the city of Vinnytsia. Vendychany hosts the administration of Vendychany settlement hromada, one of the hromadas of Ukraine. Population: 3,652 (2022 estimate)

== History ==
Until 26 January 2024, Vendychany was designated urban-type settlement. On this day, a new law entered into force which abolished this status, and Vendychany became a rural settlement.

== Economy ==
=== Transportation ===
Vendychany railway station is on the railway which connects Zhmerynka with Mohyliv-Podilskyi and crosses into Moldova. There is infrequent passenger traffic.

The settlement is on Highway M21 which connects [Mohyliv-Podilskyi and Zhytomyr via Vinnytsia.
