= Chernigov Province =

Chernigov Province may refer to:

- Chernigov Governorate, a governorate of the Russian Empire
- Chernihiv Oblast, an administrative division of Ukraine
