= Chernivtsi Raion, Vinnytsia Oblast =

Former subdivision of Vinnytsia Oblast, Ukraine

Chernivtsi Raion Чернівецький район
- Raion
- Flag Coat of arms

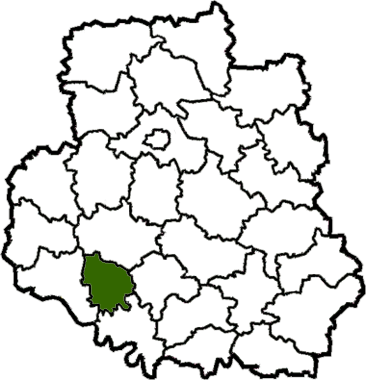
- Coordinates: 48°33′00″N 28°06′00″E
- Country: Ukraine
- Oblast: Vinnytsia Oblast
- Established: 28 November 1990
- Disestablished: 18 July 2020
- Admin. center: Chernivtsi.
- Subdivisions: List: 0 — city councils; 1 — settlement councils; 13 — rural councils; Number of localities: 0 — cities; 1 — urban-type settlements; 33 — villages; — rural settlements

Government
  - Governor: Valeriy Yatsko

Area
  - Total: 590 km^{2} (230 sq mi)

Population (2020)
  - Total: 20,209 ▼
  - Density: 34/km^{2} (89/sq mi)
- Time zone: UTC+02:00 (EET)
  - Summer (DST): UTC+03:00 (EEST)
- Postal index: 24100—24141
- Area code: +380 4357
- Website: http://chervlada.org.ua/

Chernivtsi Raion (Ukrainian: Чернівецький район) was one of raions of Vinnytsia Oblast, located in southwestern Ukraine. The administrative center of the raion was the urban-type settlement of Chernivtsi. The raion was abolished and its territory was merged into Mohyliv-Podilskyi Raion on 18 July 2020 as part of the administrative reform of Ukraine, which reduced the number of raions of Vinnytsia Oblast to six. The last estimate of the raion population was 20,209 (2020 est.).
