= Chernihiv Air Base =

Chernihiv
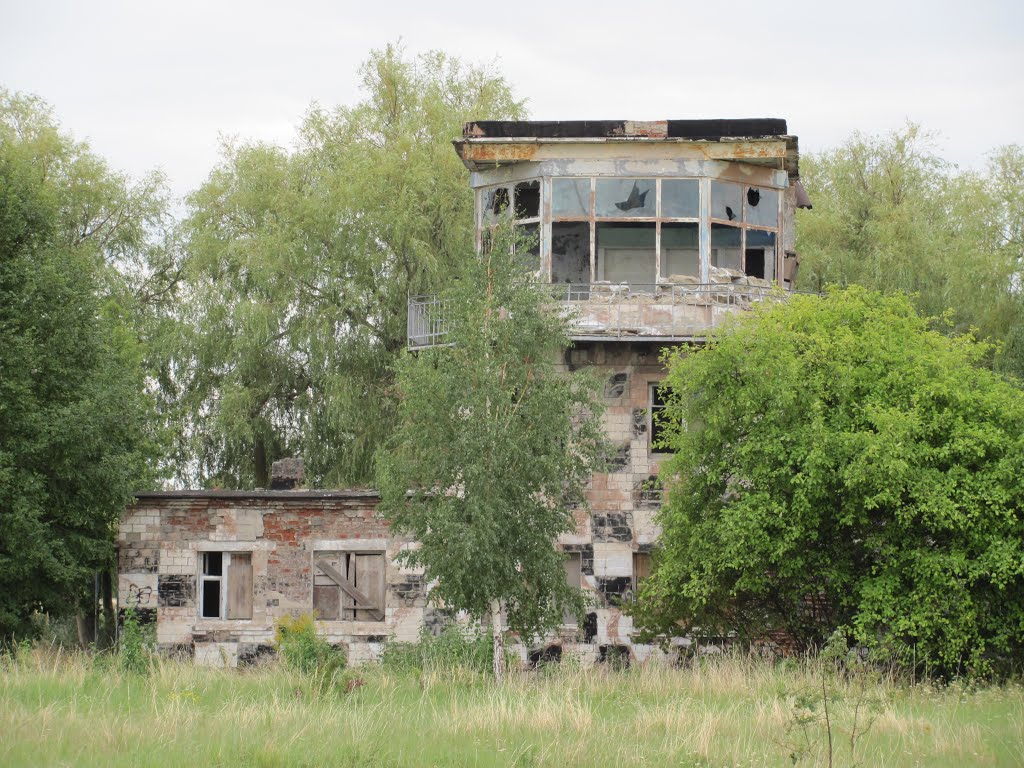
- Air tower in 2015
- IATA: none; ICAO: UKKP

Summary
- Airport type: Military
- Operator: unknown
- Location: Chernihiv
- Elevation AMSL: 446 ft / 136 m
- Coordinates: 51°33′0″N 031°19′0″E
- Interactive map of Chernihiv

Runways
Direction	Length		Surface
Direction	ft	m	Surface
	8,202	2,500	Concrete

Chernihiv (Ukrainian: Чернігів; also given in the Soviet era as Chernigov from Russian: Чернигов) was an air base in Ukraine located 5 km north of Chernihiv. It was a training base. It was home to 701 UAP (701st Aviation Training Regiment) flying 101 Aero L-39C aircraft as of 1992.

The Chernihiv Military Aviation School of Pilots was activated on 6 November 1940 in Chernihiv. On 17 July 1941 it was renamed Zernograd Military Aviation School of Pilots, but reverted to its old name on 21 October 1941. On 5 December 1944 it was awarded the Red Banner, and it had five training squadrons (1st to 5th) in September 1945. It was disbanded on 15 July 1946.

It was reformed on 15 February 1951 at Chernihiv, Chernihiv Oblast, as the 57th Military Aviation School of Pilots.

Organisation in 1960:

- 701st Training Aviation Regiment (Chernihiv, Chernihiv Oblast) with MiG-15 and Yak-18
- 702nd Training Aviation Regiment (Gorodnya, Chernihiv Oblast) with MiG-15 and Yak-18
- 703rd Training Aviation Regiment (Uman, Cherkassy Oblast) with MiG-15 and Yak-18

In 1963 the school was renamed Chernihiv Higher Military Aviation School of Pilots. In October 1968 the school received the official byname "Leninist Komsomol".

The school was subordinated to the:

- April 1964 – April 1968: VVS Kiev Military District
- April 1968 – June 1980: 17th Air Army
- June 1980 – May 1988: VVS Kiev Military District
- May 1988 – January 1992: 17th Air Army

In early 1992 the school was taken over by the government of Ukraine.

== Notable alumni ==
- Leonid Kadeniuk, Ukrainian astronaut and pilot

== Gallery ==
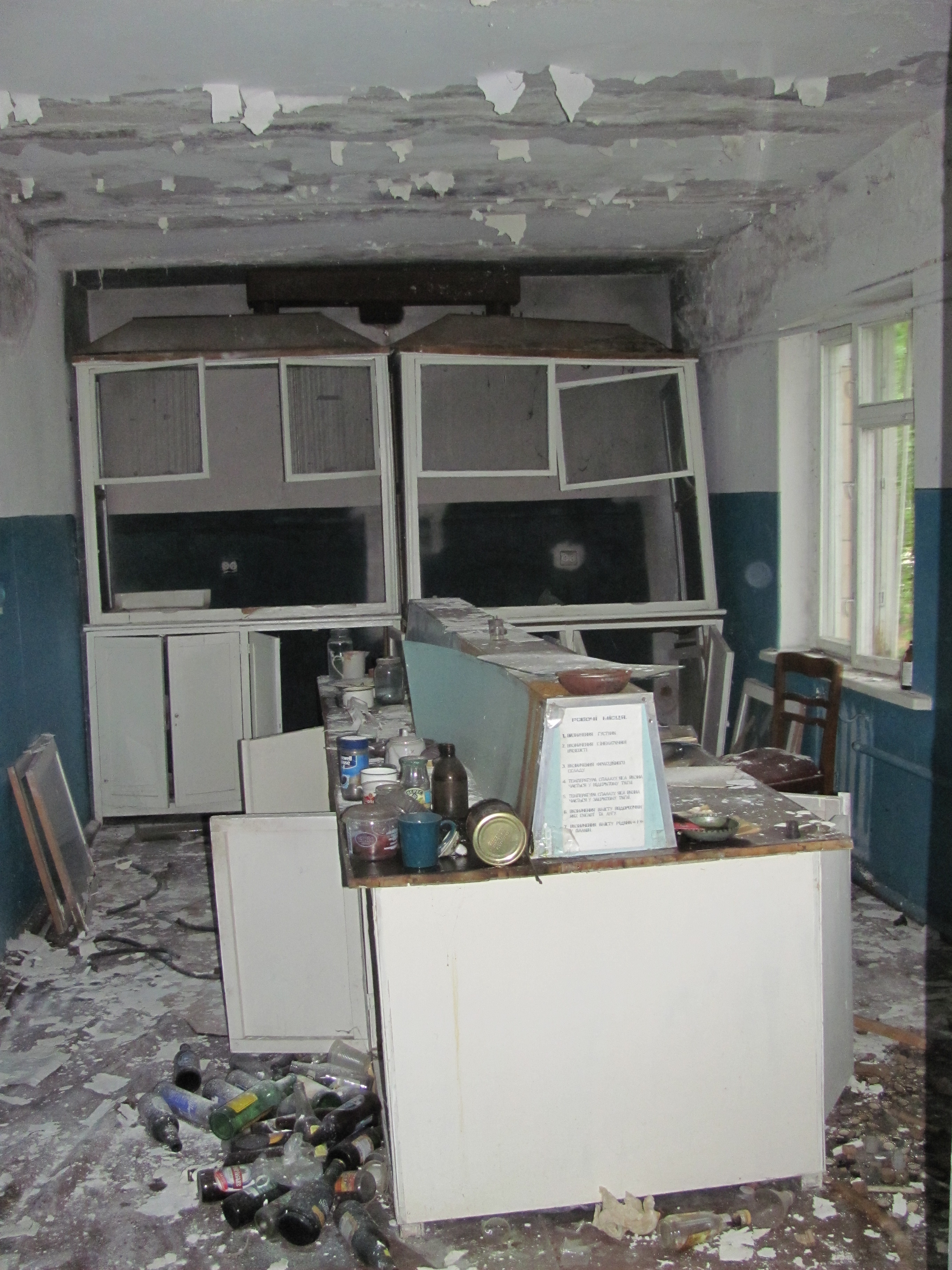
Chemical laboratory for fuel quality control

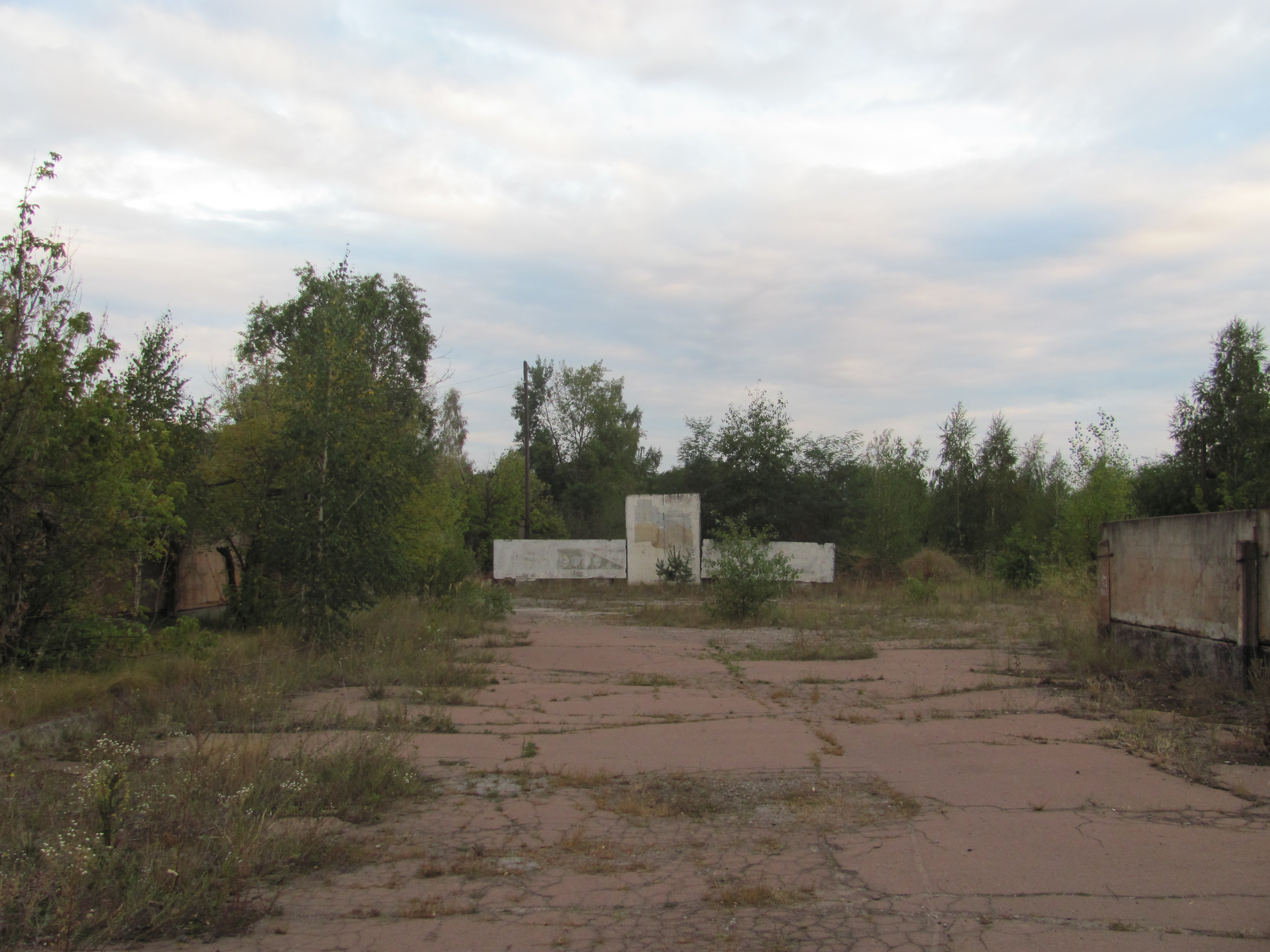
Abandoned military unit at the airbase

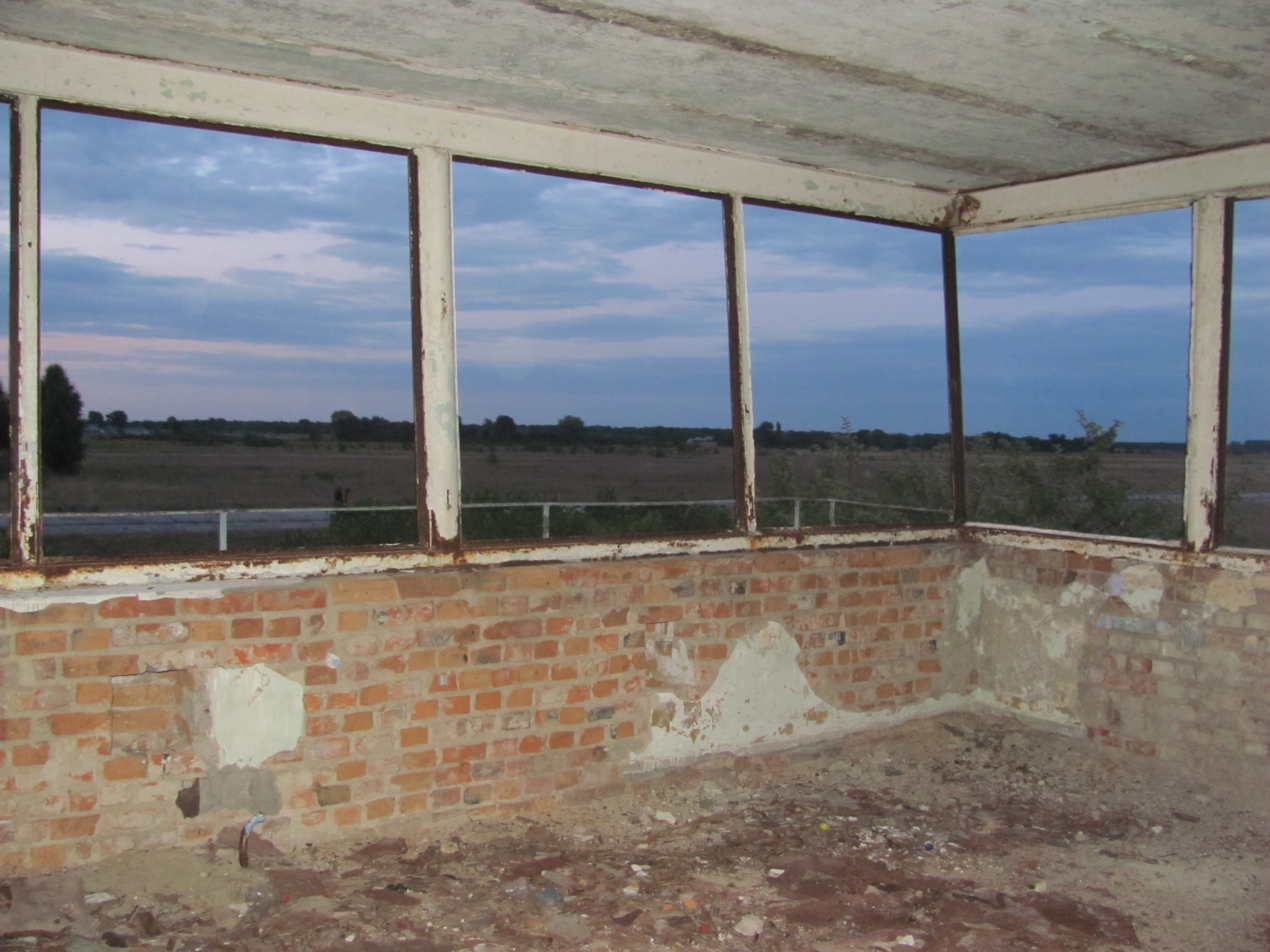
View of the runway

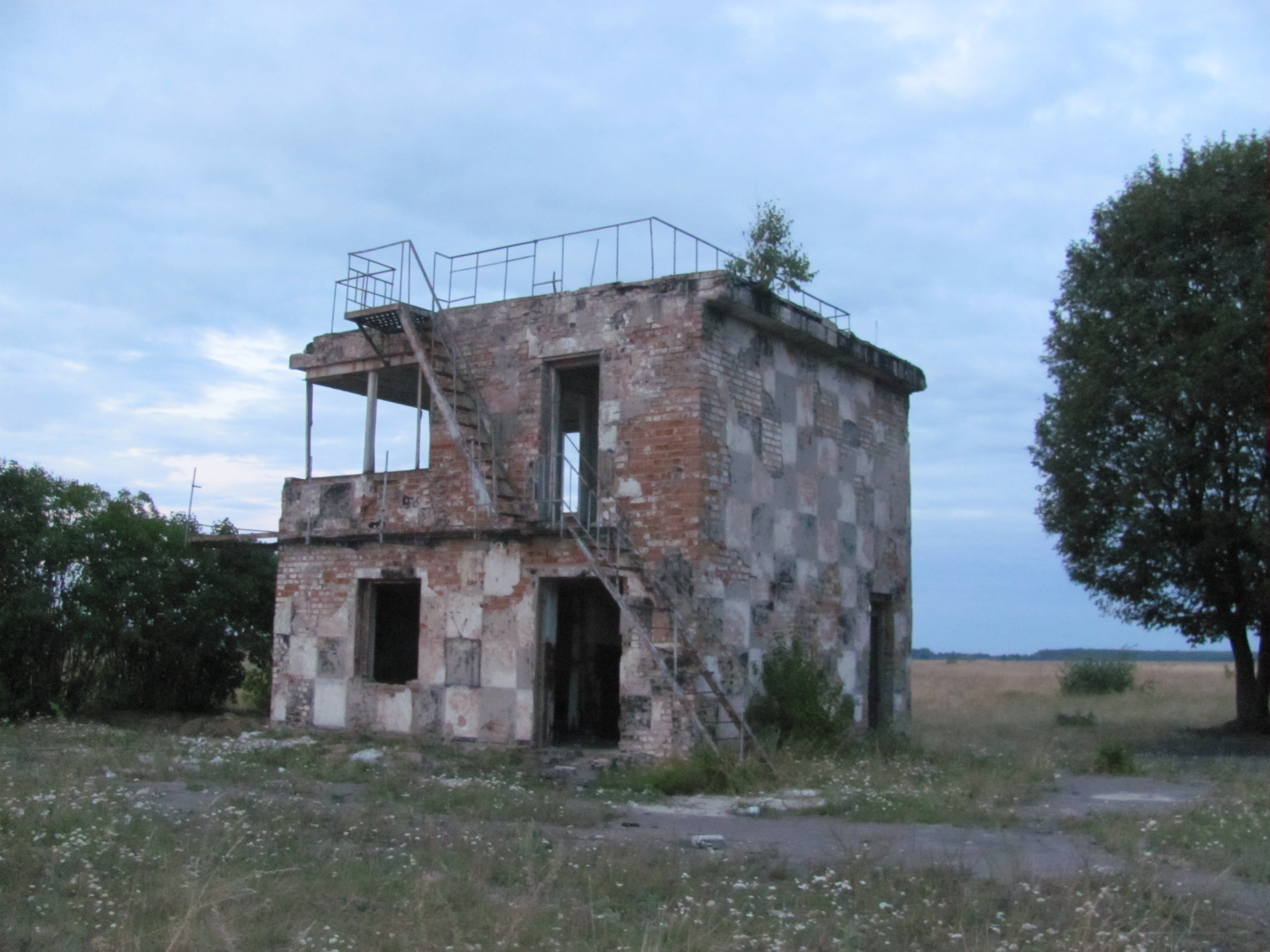
Administrative building

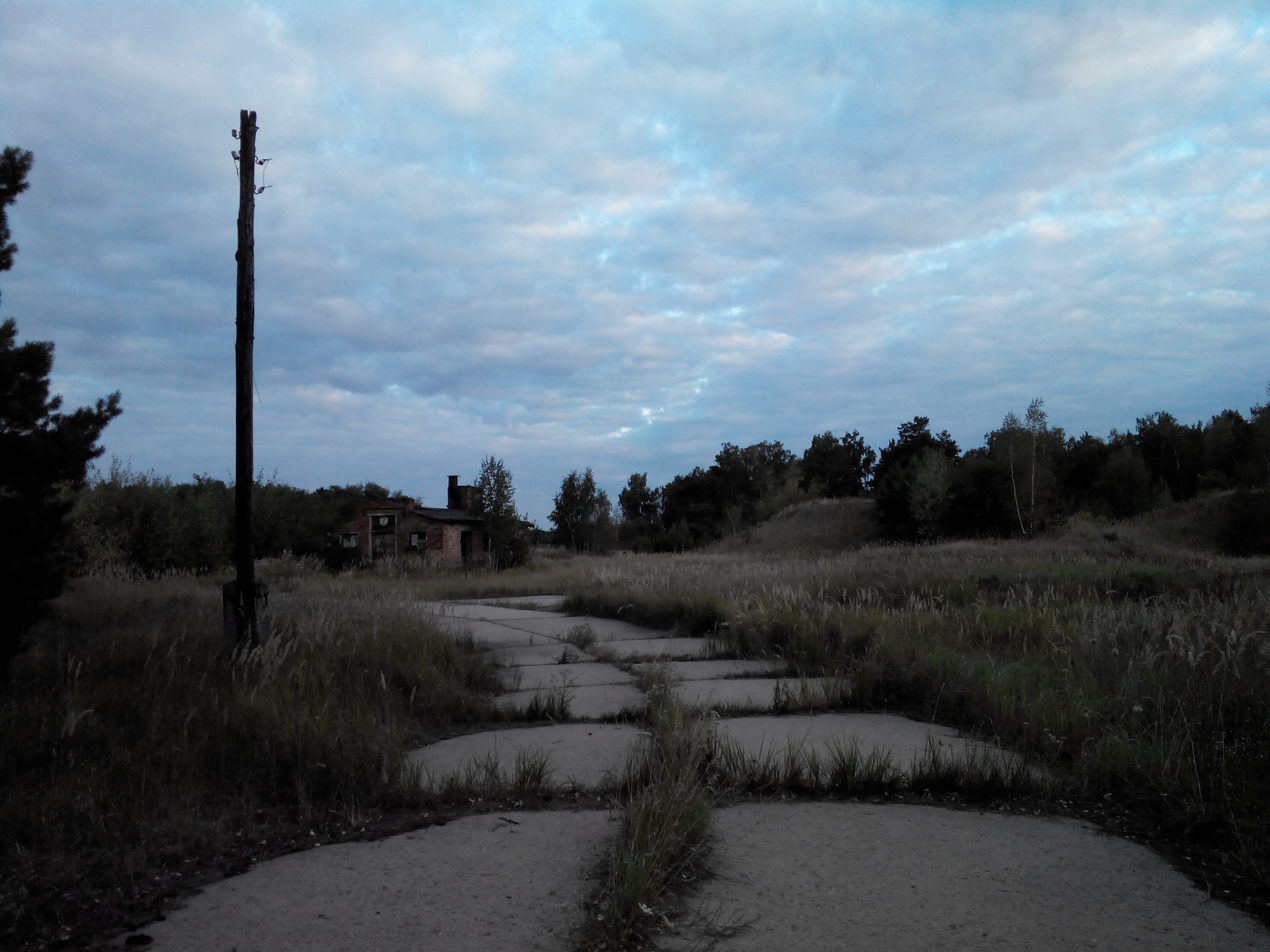
Grass is on the taxiway

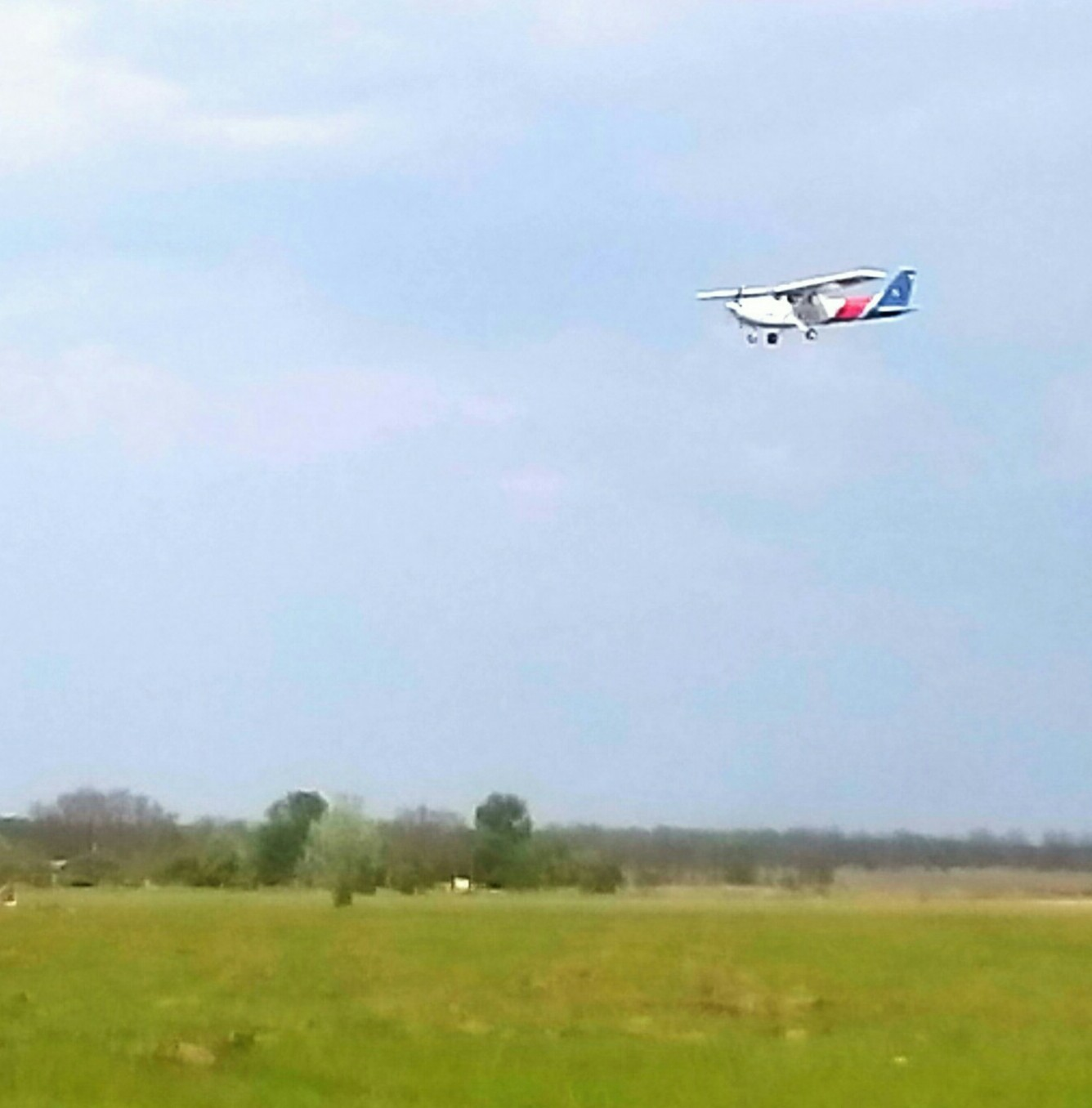
Chernihiv AviaFest 2017
