= Bukovina District =

Administrative-territorial unit of the Kingdom of Galicia and Lodomeria

Bukovina (1775–1786) Bukowina; also Buchenland Bukovina District / Chernivtsi District (1786–1849) Bukowiner Kreis / Kreis Bukowina / Kreis Czernowitz
- 1775–1849; 1860–1861
- Flag of Galicia and Lodomeria (1775–1849) Coat of arms of Galicia and Lodomeria (1805)

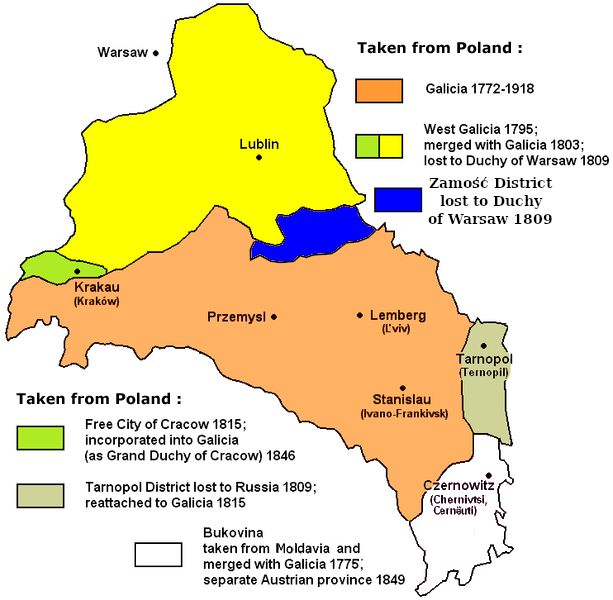
- Territorial evolution of the Kingdom of Galicia and Lodomeria, which used to include Bukovina
- Capital: Czernowitz (Cernăuți / Chernivtsi)
- Common languages: German, Romanian, Ukrainian
- History
  - Habsburg annexation of Bukovina into Galicia and Lodomeria as a military district: 1775
  - Bukovina becomes a formal district of Galicia and Lodomeria: 1786
  - Detached as the Duchy of Bukovina: 13 March 1849
  - Reincorporated into Galicia and Lodomeria: 31 August 1860
  - Duchy re-established: 28 February 1861
Preceded by	Succeeded by
Moldavia	Duchy of Bukovina
- Today part of: Romania; Ukraine

The Bukovina District (German: Bukowiner Kreis or Kreis Bukowina), also known as the Chernivtsi District (German: Kreis Czernowitz), was an administrative division – a Kreis (lit. 'circle') – of the Kingdom of Galicia and Lodomeria within the Habsburg monarchy (from 1804 the Austrian Empire) in Bukovina, annexed from Moldavia. It was first a military district from 1775 to 1786 until it was officially incorporated into Galicia and Lodomeria as its own district.

On 13 March 1849, following the revolutions of 1848, Bukovina was detached from Galicia and Lodomeria, becoming the Duchy of Bukovina, a separate crown land of the Austrian Empire. It was reincorporated into Galicia and Lodomeria on 31 August 1860 but detached once again on 28 February 1861 by the February Patent.

== Geographical location ==
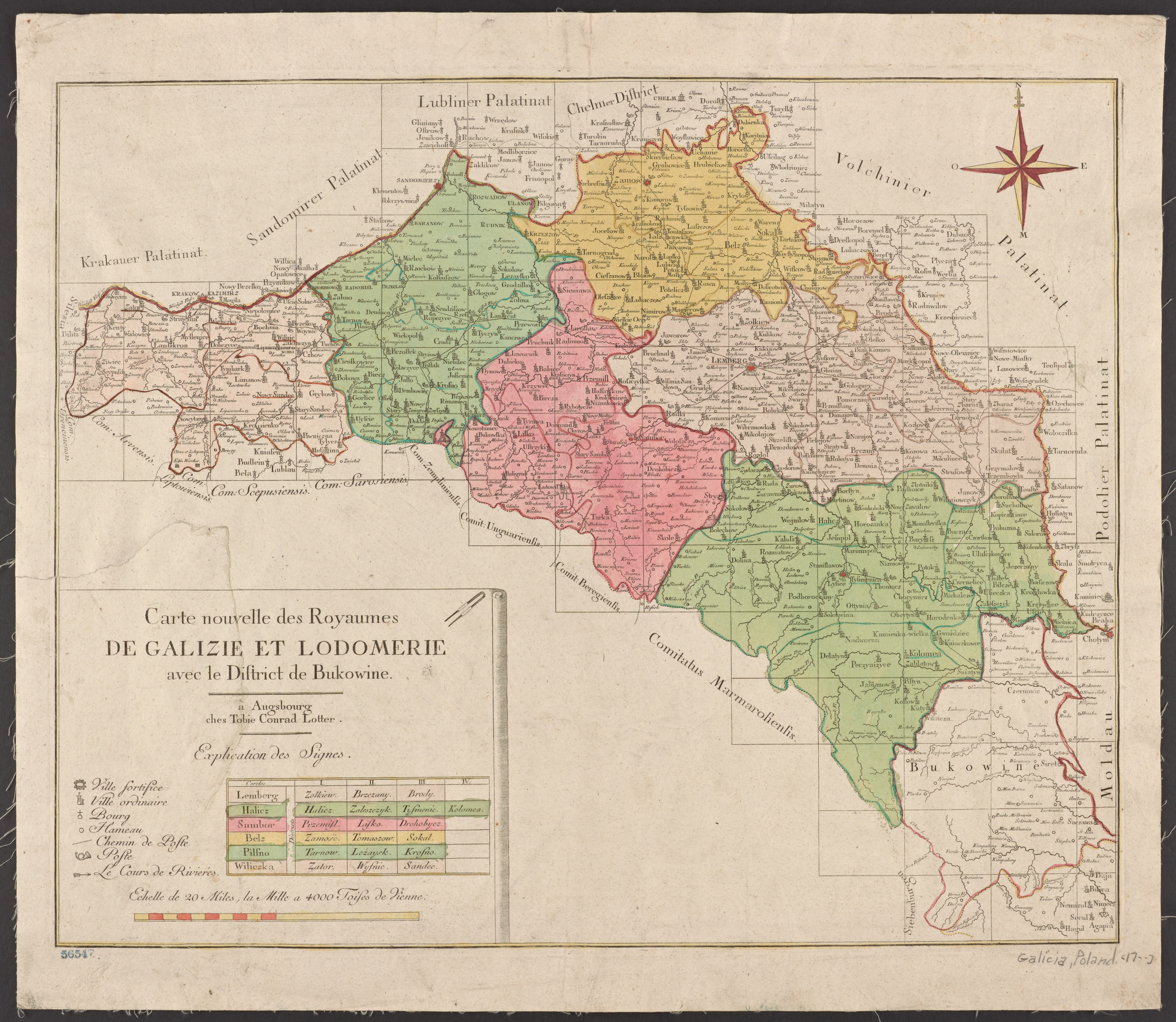
The Bukovina District, and six districts of the Kingdom of Galicia and Lodomeria in 1777-1782

The Bukovina district occupied the area between the Carpathians mountains and the Seret, from the middle reaches of the Dniester to about the middle reaches of Moldavia. It was located in the east of the Austrian Empire and in the southeast of the Kingdom of Galicia and Lodomeria.

Western Bukovina was part of the Habsburg monarchy from the second half of 1774. Until May 1775 as a temporary military administrative-territorial unit - Chernivtsi General. It was join the Kingdom of Galicia and Lodomeria, and the south (districts of Seret and Suceava, and Dovgopol district) to the Kingdom of Hungary.

However, such intentions were strongly opposed by the local population of Dovhopil region (about 90% of the population were ethnic Ruthenians and Poles), which geographically separated the mostly Romanian Suceava from Transylvania, which forced to abandon this idea.

The final decision on the future management of the region was made on August 6, 1786, during the stay in Lviv of Joseph II, who liquidated his Patent The Military Administration of Bukovina (as having fulfilled its mission during the transition period) and annexed the Bukovina District (in full) to the Kingdom of Galicia and Lodomeria as the Chernivtsi District, later renamed the Bukovina District.

== Population ==
The period of the region's status as a district of the Kingdom of Galicia and Lodomeria is characterized by a significant increase in population, mainly due to immigrants, colonizers and more. The tributary was recorded by both the Romanians from Transylvania and the Ruthenians from Galicia. Germans, Poles, and mostly Jews came from different regions. In 1786, the population of the region was estimated at 91,000 inhabitants.

Prior to that, the population was rewritten exclusively for a religion that blurred the boundaries between Ruthenians (Ukrainians) and Wallachians (Romanians), generalizing them as Orthodox. According to the results of the 1846 census: 180,417 Ruthenians (Ukrainians) were recorded. (48.6%), Wallachians (Romanians) - 140,625 people. (37.9%), other nationalities (mainly Germans, Jews, Poles) - 50089 people. (13.5%). Such results were obtained within the Bukovina district as a whole (northern and southern parts).

Before the Habsburg acquisition of the province in 1774, local Eastern Orthodox Christians had their eparchy (diocese), centered at Rădăuți, and headed by a bishop who was under the ecclesiastical jurisdiction of the Metropolitan of Moldavia. That remained unchanged until 1782, when episcopal seat was moved to Chernivtsi, and already in 1783 the jurisdiction over the diocese was transferred to the Metropolitanate of Karlovci.

== Territorial division of the district ==
Bukovina district was divided into four counties (until August 1, 1794 – districts) and one separate district:

- Chernivtsi County (German: Bezirk Czernowitz).
- Vyzhnytsya district
- Seret County
- Suceava County
- Dovhopil district

Each county consisted of 12 districts with 10 communities in each.

In the military organization, Bukovina district was divided into Chernivtsi and Suceava regimental districts, in the fiscal sphere - into eight tax districts.

The administrative center of the Bukovina district was the city of Chernivtsi.

In 1854, while the district was detached from Galicia and Lodomeria, Bukovina was divided into 15 Bezirke (districts) – Dorna, Putilla, Wysznitz, Kimpolung, Solka, Gurahumora, Sereth, Waskoutz am Czeremosz, Sadagura, Storoschinetz, Kotzmann, Zastawna, Suczawa, Radautz and Czernowitz (environs) – plus the Stadtbezirk (city-district) of Czernowitz. These districts were administered via four Bezirksämter (district offices) located in Czernowitz, Suczawa, Storoschinetz and Radautz. These divisions were retained when Bukovina was re-attached to Galicia and Lodomeria in 1860.
