= Mohyliv-Podilskyi Raion =

Subdivision of Vinnytsia Oblast, Ukraine

Mohyliv-Podilskyi Raion Могилів-Подільський район
- Raion
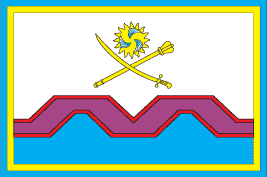
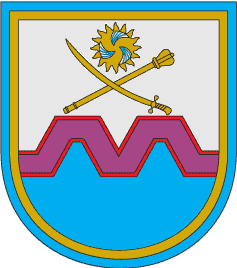
- Flag Coat of arms

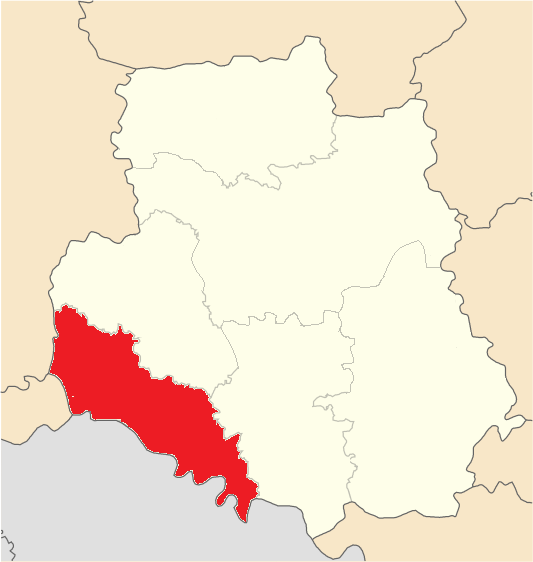
- Interactive map of Mohyliv-Podilskyi Raion
- Coordinates: 48°30′N 27°45′E
- Country: Ukraine
- Oblast: Vinnytsia Oblast
- Established: 1925
- Admin. center: Mohyliv-Podilskyi
- Subdivisions: 7 hromadas

Government
  - Governor: Myhaylo Vdovtsov

Area
  - Total: 3,220.5 km^{2} (1,243.4 sq mi)

Population (2022)
  - Total: 139,828
  - Density: 43.418/km^{2} (112.45/sq mi)
- Time zone: UTC+02:00 (EET)
  - Summer (DST): UTC+03:00 (EEST)
- Postal index: 24005-24063
- Area code: +380 4337
- Website: http://rda.m-p.org.ua/

Mohyliv-Podilskyi Raion (Ukrainian: Могилів-Подільський район) is one of the six raions (districts) of Vinnytsia Oblast, located in southwestern Ukraine. The administrative center of the raion is the city of Mohyliv-Podilskyi. Population: 139,828 (2022 estimate).

== History ==
On 18 July 2020, as part of the administrative reform of Ukraine, the number of raions of Vinnytsia Oblast was reduced to six, and the area of Mohyliv-Podilskyi Raion was significantly expanded. The January 2020 estimate of the raion population was 31,793 (2020 est.).

== Geography ==
Mohyliv-Podilskyi Raion is located in the southwest of Vinnytsia region. It borders Chernivtsi and Khmelnytskyi regions of Ukraine, and with Moldova. The area of the district is 3221.0 km^{2}.

While the raion contains many villages and rural-type settlements, there are only two cities in the district: Mohyliv-Podilskyi and Vendychany. There are additionally three urban-type settlements: Chernivtsi, Sloboda-Bushanska, and Murovani Kurylivtsi.

Mohyliv-Podilskyi Raion district is located on the southern slopes of Podilska upland. The relief of the district is an undulating plain, cut by river valleys, ravines, and gullies.

The climate is moderately continental. Winter is cool, summer is not hot. The average temperature in July is +20 °C, in January −5 °C. The maximum precipitation falls in the summer in the form of rain. The average annual amount is from 520 to 590 mm, changing from west to east.

Mohyliv-Podilskyi Raion is located in the Dniester valley, on its left side.

Mohyliv-Podilskyi Raion is located in the forest-steppe natural zone. Among the trees in the forests, oaks and hornbeam dominate. Typical large mammals are elk, roe deer, wild boar, squirrels, beavers, hares and wolves.

Mohyliv-Podilskyi Raion has reserves of limestone and sandstone.

== Communities of the district ==
Number of settlements 195. Number of cities – 2. Mohyliv-Podilskyi Raion includes 7 territorial communities. It includes: urban - Mohyliv-Podilskyi and Yampilskyi; rural - Yaryshivskyi, Babchynetskyi; settlement - Vendychanskyi, Murovano-Kurylovetskyi, Chernivtsi.

== Transport ==
Mohyliv-Podilskyi Raion is crossed by railway tracks and highways by the Vinnytsia connection. Passes through Haisyn European route E583.

== Bibliography ==
- Національний атлас України/НАН України, Інститут географії, Державна служба геодезії, картографії та кадастру; голов. ред. Л. Г. Руденко; голова ред. кол.Б.Є. Патон. — К.: ДНВП «Картографія», 2007. — 435 с. — 5 тис.прим. — ISBN 978-966-475-067-4.
- Географічна енциклопедія України : [у 3 т.] / редкол.: О. М. Маринич (відповід. ред.) та ін. — К., 1989—1993. — 33 000 екз. — ISBN 5-88500-015-8.

== People from Mohyliv-Podilskyi Raion ==
- Serhiy Budza
- Volodymyr Didushytsky
- Raya Dunayevskaya
- Oleksander Lototsky
