= Hnatiuk =

Hnatiuk (Ukrainian: Гнатюк) is a gender-neutral Ukrainian surname. It may refer to:

- Dmytro Hnatiuk or Hnatyuk (1925–2016), Ukrainian opera singer and politician
- Glen Hnatiuk (born 1965), Canadian golfer
- Halyna Hnatiuk or Hnatyuk (1927–2016), Ukrainian linguist, wifa of Dmytro Hnatiuk
- Jim Hnatiuk (1950–2018), Canadian politician
- Mykola Hnatiuk or Hnatiuk (born 1952), Ukrainian singer
- Roger Hnatiuk (born 1946), Canadian-Australian botanist
- Volodymyr Hnatiuk (1871–1926), Ukrainian writer

== See also ==
- Hnatyuk
