= Lion's Society =

Cultural NGO in Ukraine

- Товариство Лева
- Nickname: Lion cubs
- Predecessor: Lviv Komsomol
- Formation: 19 October 1987; 38 years ago
- Headquarters: Lviv, Ukraine

The Lion's Society (Ukrainian: Товариство Лева, romanized: Tovarystvo Leva), also colloquially referred to as the Leveniata (Ukrainian: Левенята, lit. 'lion cubs') is a cultural non-governmental organisation (NGO) in Ukraine. Founded in 1987, the Lion's Society played an important role in the revival of Ukrainian culture in Galicia prior to and during the 1989–1991 Ukrainian revolution, both as the results of its own actions and from the several organisations which split off from it. American historian Padraic Kenney has argued that the group was significant in restoring Lviv's Central European identity after Soviet rule.

== Overview ==
The Lion's Society was founded on 19 October 1987 as an outgrowth of the Komsomol in the western Ukrainian city of Lviv. Orest Sheika, a member of the local Komsomol chapter, had placed an appeal in the organisation's Leninist Youth newspaper for a subbotnik to be devoted to cleaning the local Lychakiv Cemetery on 4 July 1987. The appeal had brought several dozen people to attend, and a few days after the subbotnik the process of establishing the Lion's Society began. In contrast to more radical dissident organisations, which were demanding sovereignty for Ukraine, the Lion's Society focused on local culture in Galicia.

Early activities of the Lion's Society included memorialisation of dissident poet Vasyl Symonenko and the revival of Vertep in Lviv, as well as vesnianky dances. Outside of Lviv, the society launched an expedition to the village of Havarechchyna to learn and assist in the continued creation of local ceramic traditions. Members of the society were also engaged in environmental activism, protesting outside the building of the Lviv Oblast Council against the creation of a reservoir near Stryi.

With the intensification of perestroika in the leadup to the 19th All-Union Conference of the Communist Party of the Soviet Union the Lion's Society increasingly found itself at the centre of the growing Ukrainian anti-communist movement. Sheika's name was publicly floated as a possible delegate to the conference, and activists from the society had formed the Taras Shevchenko Society for the Ukrainian Language, a group involved in helping to promote the Ukrainian language against Russification. The group organised community theatre performances at the Young Spectator Theatre (now the First Ukrainian Theatre for Children and Youth) on the Shevchenko Days.

The Lion's Society's increased growth also brought notable figures of the Ukrainian dissident movement to its defence, notably Mykhailo Horyn. Horyn praised the society particularly for the foundation of the Shevchenko Society, referring to it as "one of the rungs of the ladder by which we will raise our consciousness, which has fallen so low it is difficult to imagine." The society continued to organise events throughout 1988, including the Dniester-88 rafting expedition to investigate the ecological state of the Dniester basin. The path of the expedition has since become the site of an annual rafting competition and ecological study.

During the 1989 Soviet Union legislative election the Lion's Society ignored calls from the Ukrainian Helsinki Union (at the time the only non-communist political party in Ukraine) to boycott the election. Instead, they nominated poet and society member Rostyslav Bratun as a candidate for deputy. Bratun exemplified the society's policies of multiculturalism, being closely connected with Lviv's Polish and Jewish communities and supporting the revival of the Ukrainian Greek Catholic Church despite being Eastern Orthodox. Bratun would go on to be successfully elected, and parliamentary immunity enabled him to serve as a vocal proponent for Ukrainian independence.

Since the Declaration of Independence of Ukraine the Lion's Society has left politics, although it continues to be active in organising certain actions such as Dniester-88.

== Legacy ==
Several other non-governmental organisations during the 1989–1991 Ukrainian revolution began as part of the Lion's Society. Spadshchyna, another organisation which would later help to form the People's Movement of Ukraine, emerged from the Lion's Society. The samizdat newspaper Postup (newspaper), the society's press organ, also served as a springboard for journalists such as Oleksandr Kryvenko and Georgiy Gongadze. American historian Padraic Kenney has said that the society played an important role in the restoration of Lviv's identity as a part of Central Europe after communist rule.
