= Hnatyuk =

Hnatyuk or Hnatiuk (Ukrainian: Гнатюк) is a gender-neutral Ukrainian surname. It may refer to:

- Dmytro Hnatyuk or Hnatiuk (1925–2016), Ukrainian opera singer and politician
- Glen Hnatiuk (born 1965), Canadian golfer
- Halyna Hnatyuk or Hnatiuk (1927–2016), Ukrainian linguist
- Jim Hnatiuk (1950–2018), Canadian politician
- Mykola Hnatyuk or Hnatiuk (born 1952), Ukrainian singer
- Roger Hnatiuk (born 1946), Canadian-Australian botanist
- Volodymyr Hnatiuk (1871–1926), Ukrainian writer

== See also ==
- Hnatiuk
