= Moryntsi =

Village in central Ukraine

Moryntsi Моринці
- Village
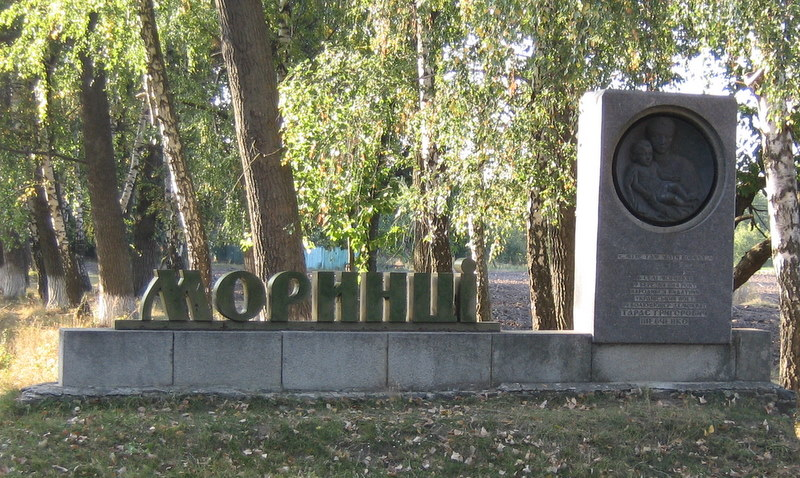

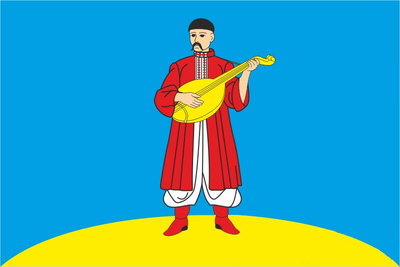
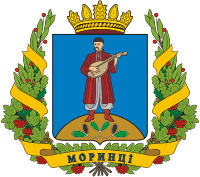
- Flag Coat of arms

- Location within Cherkasy Oblast Location within Ukraine
- Coordinates: 49°15′N 31°0′E
- Country: Ukraine
- Oblast: Cherkasy Oblast
- Raion: Zvenyhorodka Raion
- Hromada: Zvenyhorodka urban hromada

Population
  - Total: 1,417
- Website: Ukrainian Parliament website

Moryntsi (Ukrainian: Моринці) is a village (selo) in central Ukraine. It is located in the Zvenyhorodka Raion (district) of the Cherkasy Oblast (province), approximately 35 km from the raion's administrative center, Zvenyhorodka. Moryntsi belongs to Zvenyhorodka urban hromada, one of the hromadas of Ukraine.

The Ukrainian poet Taras Shevchenko was born in Moryntsi in 1814. The peasant house in which he was born has been restored and functions as a museum of his life.

== Population ==
=== Language ===
Distribution of the population by native language according to the 2001 census:

Language	Number	Percentage
Ukrainian	2 077	98.76%
Russian	26	1.24%
Total	2 103	100.00%

== History ==
Remains of the Chernyakhov culture have been found in the area of Moryntsi. The first recorded mention of the settlement was in 1648.

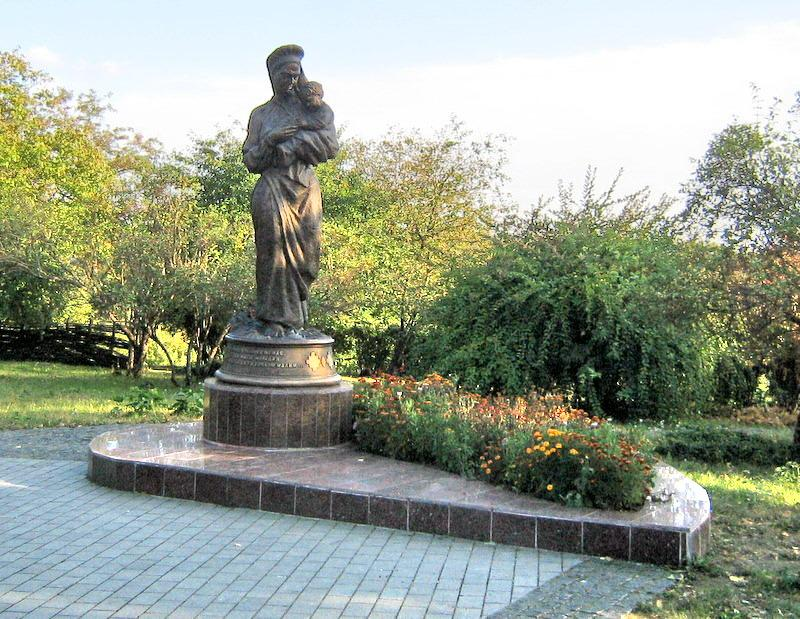
Monument to mother of Taras Shevchenko

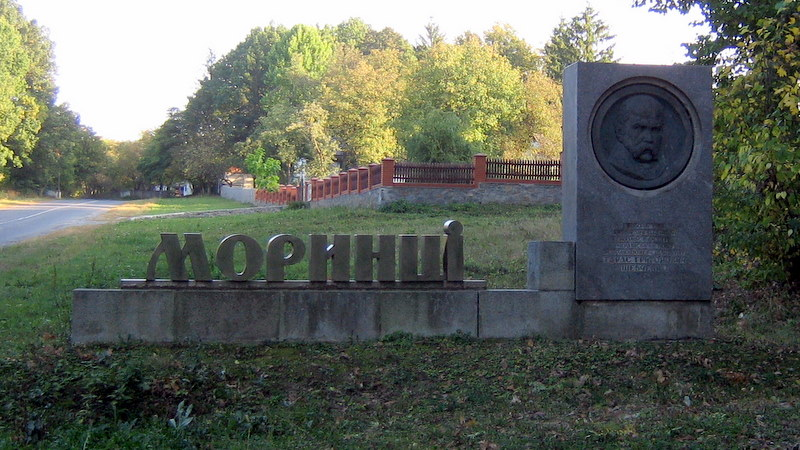
Welcome sign at the village's entrance

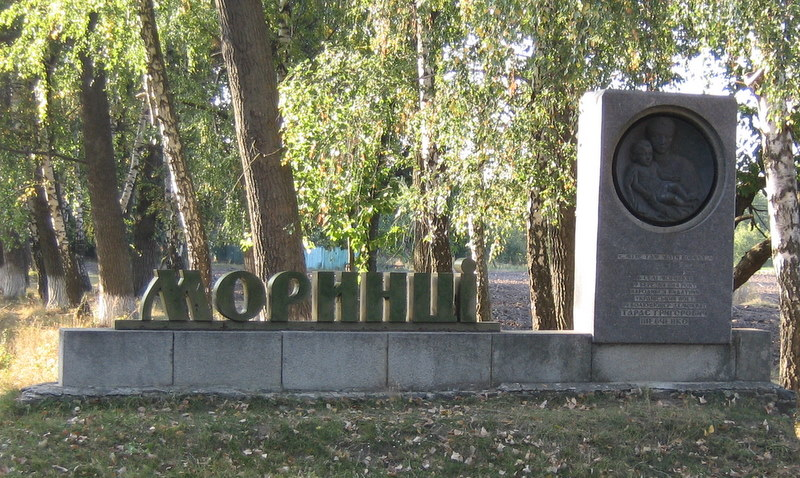
Another welcome sign at the village's entrance

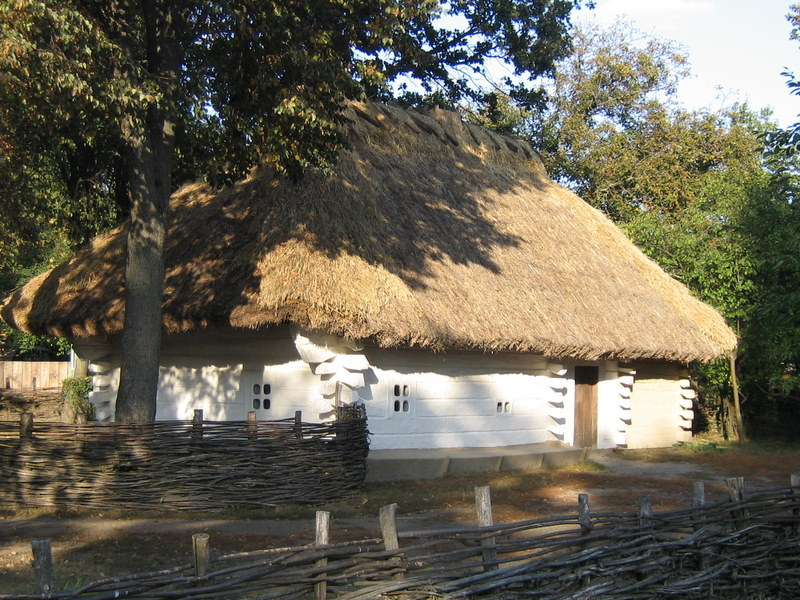
Yakym Boiko's hut, grandfather of Taras Shevchenko

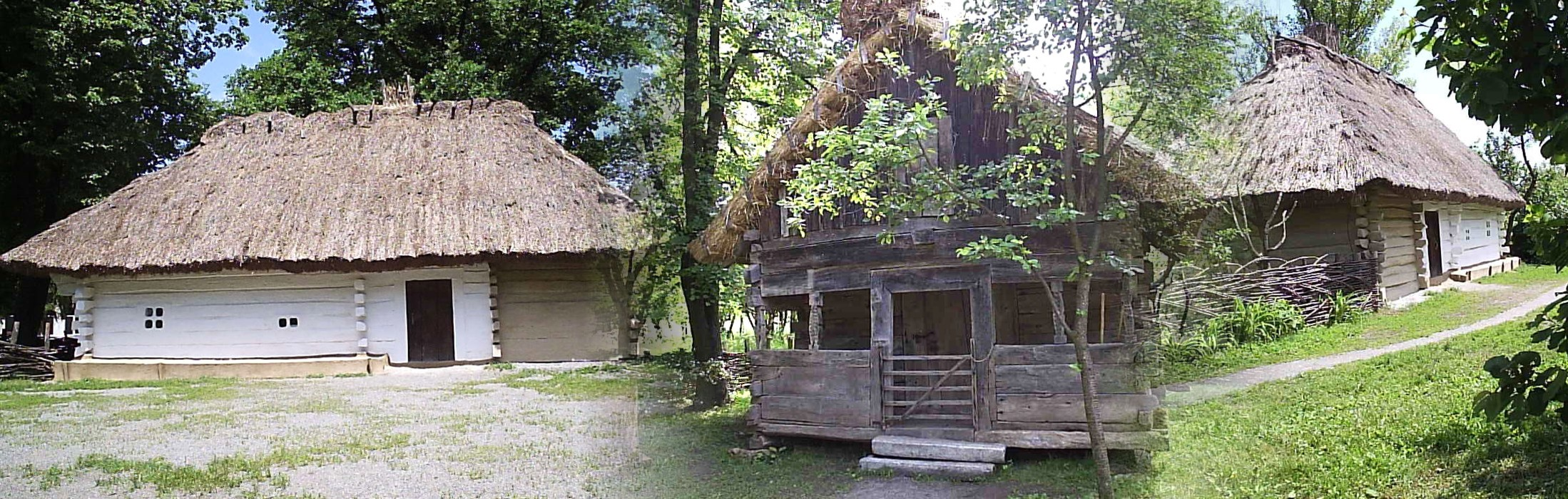
Birthplace of Shevchenko

== Sources ==
- (in Ukrainian) (1972). Історіа міст і сіл Української CCP – Черкаська область (History of Towns and Villages of the Ukrainian SSR – Cherkasy Oblast), Kiev.
