= Zvenyhorodka urban hromada =

Urban hromada of Cherkasy Oblast, Ukraine

Zvenyhorodka urban hromada Звенигородська міська громада
- Hromada
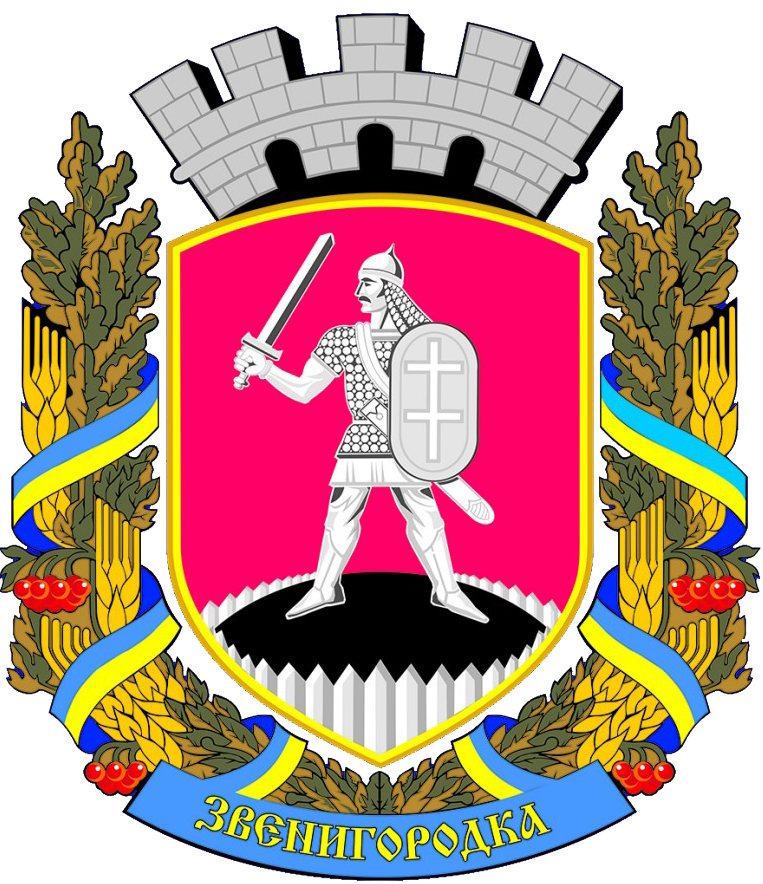
- Seal
- Interactive map of Zvenyhorodka urban hromada
- Country: Ukraine
- Oblast: Cherkasy
- Raion: Zvenyhorodka

Area
  - Total: 492.9 km^{2} (190.3 sq mi)

Population (2023)
  - Total: 31,039
  - Density: 62.97/km^{2} (163.1/sq mi)
- Settlements: 16
- Cities: 1
- Villages: 15
- Website: zven.gov.ua

Zvenyhorodka urban territorial hromada (Ukrainian: Звенигородська міська територіальна громада, romanized: Zvenyhorodska miska terytorialna hromada) is one of the hromadas of Ukraine, in Zvenyhorodka Raion within Cherkasy Oblast. Its administrative centre is the city of Zvenyhorodka.

Zvenyhorodka urban hromada has a total area of 492.9 km^{2} (190.3 mi^{2}), as well as a total population of 31,039 (as of 2023).

== Composition ==
In addition to one city (Zvenyhorodka), the hromada contains 15 villages:

- Bahachivka
- Hnylets
- Hudzivka
- Husakove
- Khlypnivka
- Kniazha
- Kozatske
- Maidanivka
- Moryntsi
- Murzyntsi
- Mykhailivka
- Nemorozh
- Pavlivka
- Stebne
- Vilkhovets
