= Spadshchyna =

Ukrainian cultural heritage and environmentalist non-governmental organisation

- Українознавчий клуб «Спадщина»
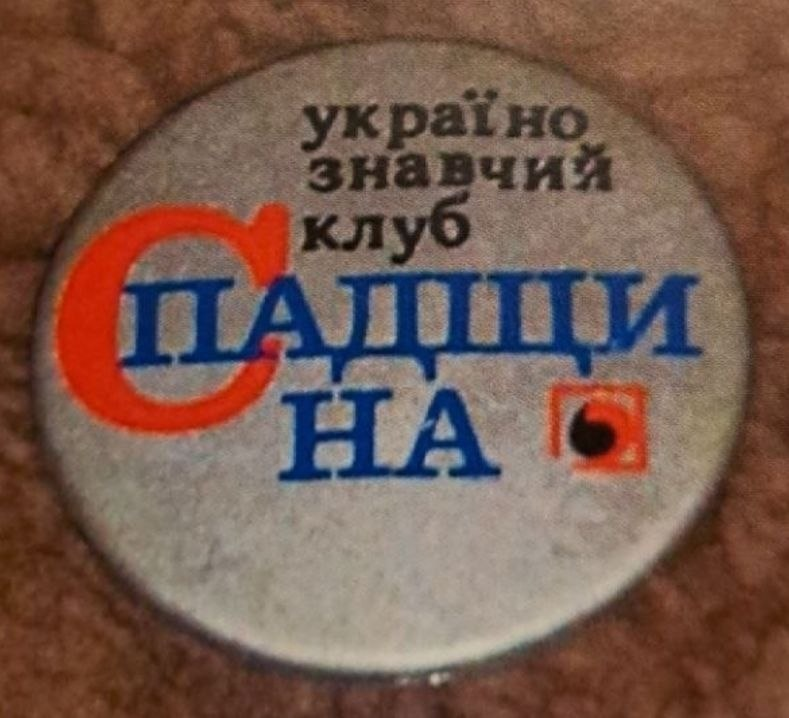
- Abbreviation: Spadshchyna
- Successor: club "Naukova Spadschina" / клуб «Наукова спадщина»
- Formation: December 1987 (38 years ago)
- Established: January 27, 1988
- Founders: Viktor Kulynych, Ivan Zaiets, Leonid Dobriansky, Oleksa Nehrebets'kyi et al.
- Founded at: 45a Volodymyrska Street, Kyiv
- Dissolved: October 2012 (14 years ago)

Spadshchyna (Ukrainian: Українознавчий клуб «Спадщина», lit. 'heritage'), also known as Ukrainian Studies Club, was a Ukrainian non-governmental organisation devoted to the protection of Ukrainian cultural heritage, the promotion of Ukrainian as a state language and opposition to nuclear power in Ukraine. Spadshchyna and its members took an active part in establishing the People's Movement of Ukraine, the popular front organisation advocating for Ukrainian independence from the Soviet Union.

== History ==
Spadshchyna was founded on the basis of the Kyiv's House of Scientists Academy of Sciences of the Ukrainian SSR. It was Ivan Zaiets, Victor Kulynych, Leonid Dobrianskyi, Yaroslav Fedoryn, Leonid Dmytrenko, Olexander Mosijuk and other young scientists of Academy of Sciences of the Ukrainian SSR, who were inspired by Ukrainian Culturological Club to establish Spadshchyna.

On 13 November 1988, Spadshchyna was an organiser of a public event in Kyiv - "The Ecology and Us", a meeting of more than ten thousand people held under the ecological slogans. At the same time their speakers, for example, Ukrainian writers Dmytro Pavlychko and Liudmyla Taranenko, expressed support for the establishment of a popular front organisation. Many of Spadshchyna's members took part in establishing the People's Movement of Ukraine, as managers or executive staff..

Spadshchyna also co-hosted an event with the Institute of History of the Ukrainian SSR on 5 December 1988 honouring historian and politician Mykhailo Hrushevsky. Around 800 people attended the event, filling the hall of the Section of Social Sciences of the Academy of Sciences (Kirov Street, 4).

During the 1990 Ukrainian Supreme Soviet election, one of the members of Spadshchyna, Ivan Zaiets was elected as a deputy to the Supreme Soviet of the Ukrainian SSR. Olexander Mosijuk was elected to the Kyiv City Council, Igor Shcherbak became a deputy to Kyiv's Pechersk District Council. Olexander Mosijuk as a vice-chair of Kyiv City Council officially lifted the Ukrainian flag over the Kyiv City Hall on 24 July 1990..

Spadshchyna called for the restoration of Ukrainian as the state language and of Ukrainian national symbols as the symbols of the country, for the revival of Kyiv-Mohyla Academy, for creating the Ivan Honchar Museum.
