= Zvenigorodka uezd =

Subdivision of Kiev Governorate, Russian Empire

Zvenigorodka uezd Звенигородский уезд
- Uezd
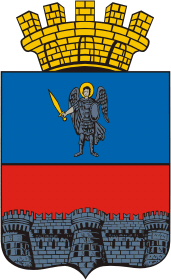
- Coat of arms

- Location in the Kiev Governorate
- Country: Russian Empire
- Krai: Southwestern
- Governorate: Kiev
- Established: 1796
- Abolished: 1923
- Capital: Zvenigorodka

Area
  - Total: 3,465.17 km^{2} (1,337.91 sq mi)

Population (1897)
  - Total: 274,704
  - Density: 79.2758/km^{2} (205.323/sq mi)

The Zvenigorodka uezd (Russian: Звенигородский уезд, romanized: Zvengorodskiy uyezd; Ukrainian: Звенигородський повіт, romanized: Zvenyhorods'kyi povit) was one of the subdivisions of the Kiev Governorate of the Russian Empire. It was situated in the southern part of the governorate. Its administrative centre was Zvenigorodka (Zvenyhorodka).

== Demographics ==
At the time of the Russian Empire Census of 1897, Zvenigorodsky Uyezd had a population of 274,704. Of these, 88.0% spoke Ukrainian, 9.7% Yiddish, 1.4% Russian, 0.6% Polish and 0.1% Romani as their native language.
