= Vilkhovets, Cherkasy Oblast =

Village in Cherkasy Oblast, Ukraine

Vilkhovets Вільховець
- Village
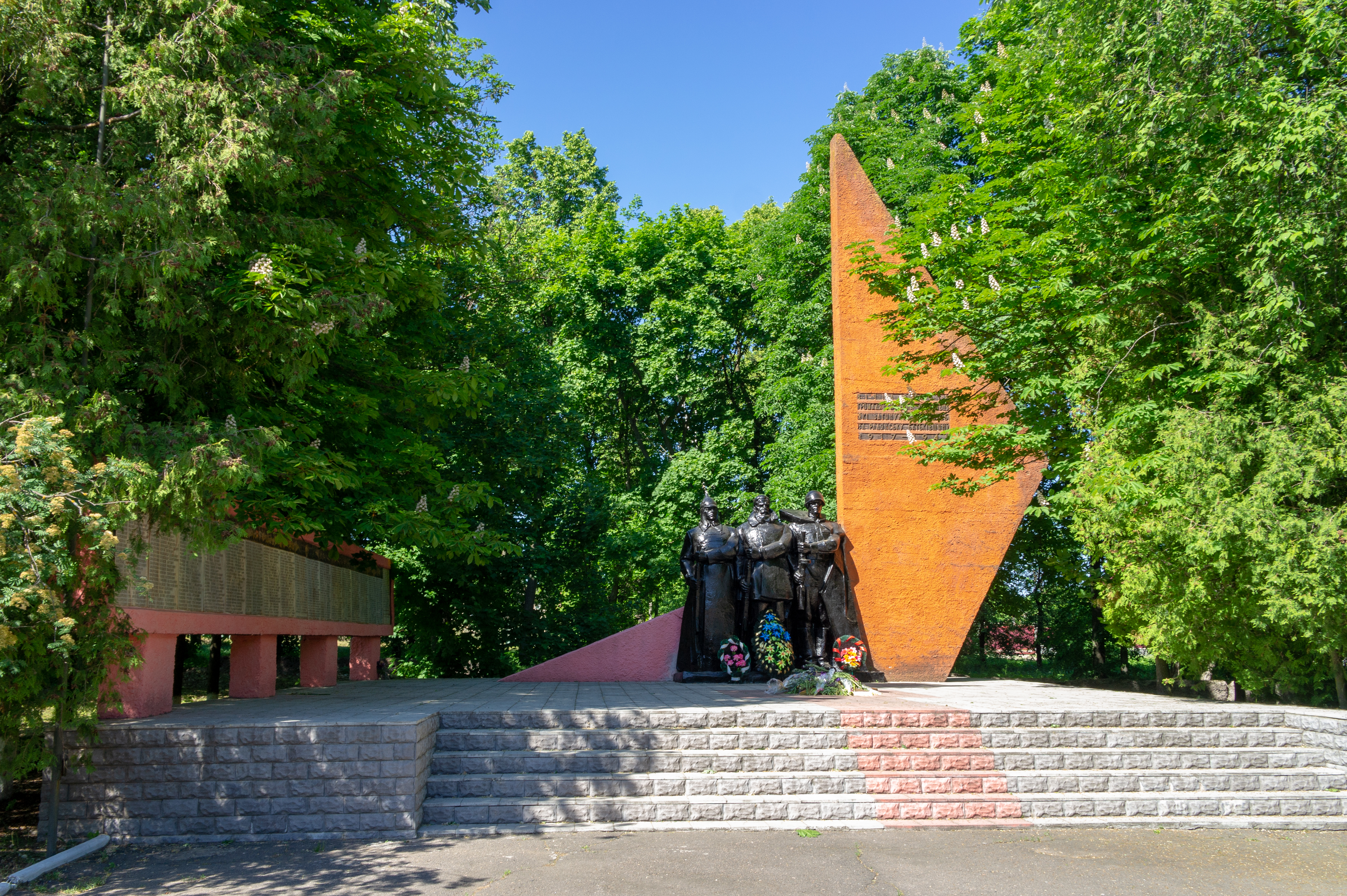
- Monument to Red Army soldiers killed during World War II

- Location of Vilkhovets in Cherkasy Oblast Location of Vilkhovets in Ukraine
- Coordinates: 49°01′56″N 30°53′46″E
- Country: Ukraine
- Oblast: Cherkasy Oblast
- Raion: Zvenyhorodka Raion
- Hromada: Zvenyhorodka urban hromada
- First mentioned: 1633

Population
  - Total: 3,048

Vilkhovets (Ukrainian: Вільховець; Russian: Ольховец, romanized: Olkhovets) is a village in Zvenyhorodka urban hromada, Zvenyhorodka Raion, Cherkasy Oblast, Ukraine. Its population is 3,048 (as of 2024).

== History ==
Vilkhovets was first mentioned in 1633. During the Ruin, it was looted and burned by soldiers of the Ottoman Empire. Hetman of the Zaporizhian Host Ivan Vyhovsky was executed by Polish soldiers near the village in 1664.

From the 17th century, the village was ruled by the Jabłonowski, Branicki, and Potocki families. Most of the residents were serfs who worked in agriculture. In a protest against landlordism, local peasants felled the private forest of the Potocki family in January 1893. The village was first occupied by the Red Army in February 1918 before coming under the occupation of Austria-Hungary and the German Empire a month later. In December, it was captured by the Directorate of Ukraine, before again being occupied by the Red Army on 4 March 1919. It was taken over by the White Army in August before being occupied by the Red Army for the final time in December.

Ukrainian dissident leader Viacheslav Chornovil lived in Vilkhovets during his childhood. A museum dedicated to him exists in the village.

== Notable people ==
- Lev Bykovskyi, bibliographer, historian, and journalist
- Mykola Liubarskyi, Hero of the Soviet Union
- Anatolii Mykhalevskyi, educator, mathematician, and filmmaker
- Serhii Syrotenko, colonel of the Armed Forces of Ukraine killed during the War in Donbas
- Petro Tymoshenko, linguist
