= Mamaivtsi =

Mamaivtsi Мамаївці
- Village
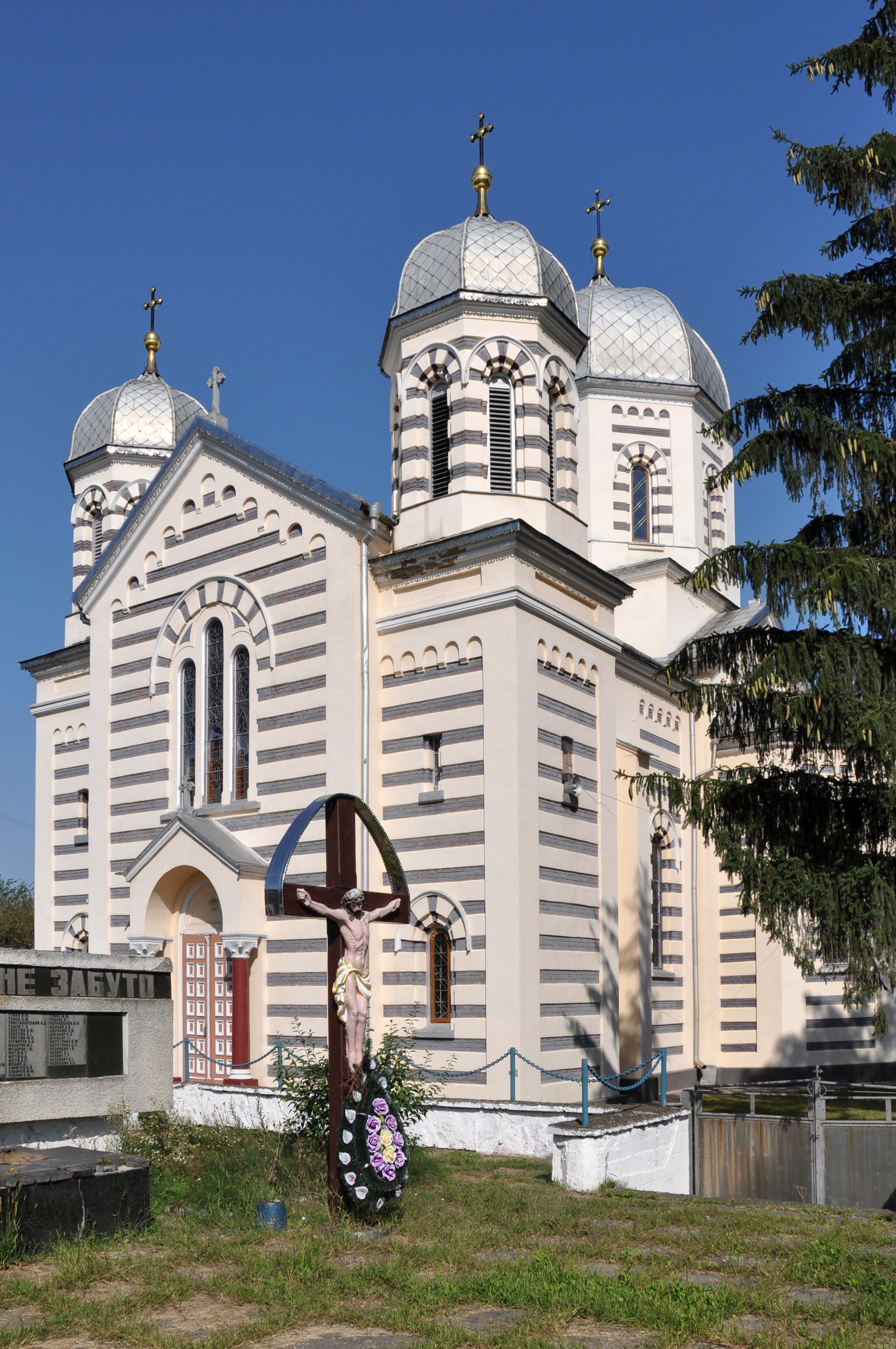
- Church in Mamaivsti

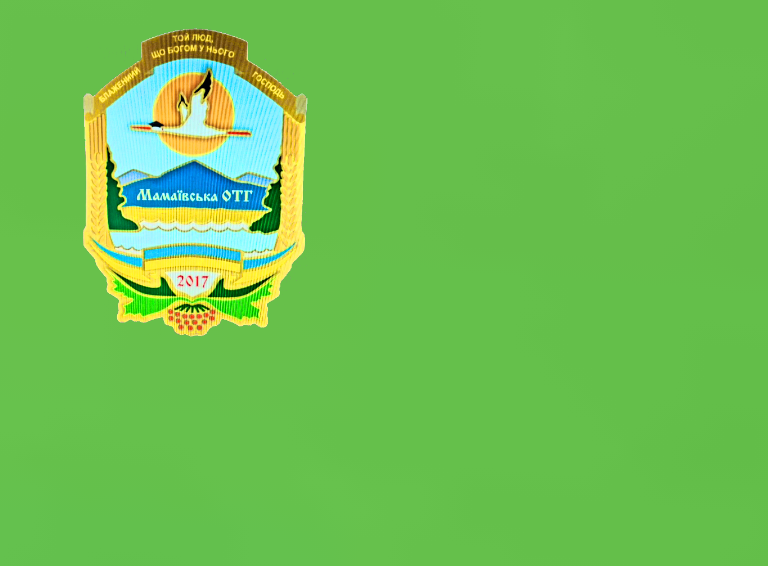
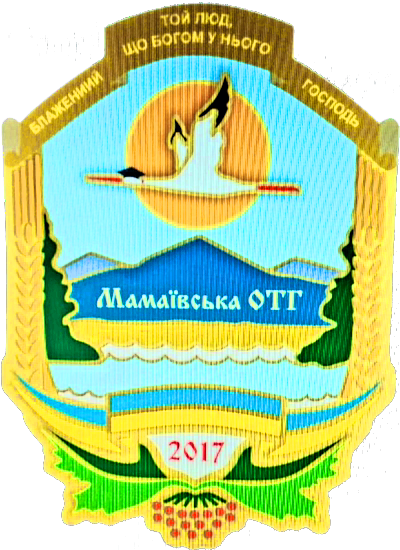
- Flag Coat of arms

- Location in Ukraine Mamaivtsi (Chernivtsi Oblast)
- Country: Ukraine
- Oblast: Chernivtsi Oblast
- Raion: Chernivtsi Raion
- Hromada: Mamaivtsi rural hromada
- Elevation: 174 m (571 ft)
- Time zone: UTC+2 (CET)
  - Summer (DST): UTC+3 (CEST)

Mamaivtsi (Ukrainian: Мамаївці; German: Alt Mamajestie; Romanian: Mămăeștii Vechi) is a village in Chernivtsi Raion in the southern part of Chernivtsi Oblast in western Ukraine. It hosts the administration of Mamaivtsi rural hromada, one of the hromadas of Ukraine. The population in 2017 was 5,818. The postal code is 59343. The telephone code is 3736. It covers an area of 4.5 square kilometres (1.7 mi^{2}). Mamaivtsi is 12.6 kilometers (7.8 miles) from the capital of Bukovina, Chernivtsi.

== History ==
The village was first mentioned in 1580. Originally, Mamaivtsi had been part of the Bukovina historical region in the Principality of Moldavia. In January 1775, following the military conflict between Turkey and Russia (1768-1774), the Habsburg monarchy (currently Austria) received part of the territory of Moldova, known as Bukovina. Since 1775, Mamaivtsi, as part of the Duchy of Bukovina, was ruled by the Austrians, part of the Chernivtsi district (German Czernowitz).

Until 18 July 2020, Mamaivtsi belonged to Kitsman Raion. The raion was abolished in July 2020 as part of the administrative reform of Ukraine, which reduced the number of raions of Chernivtsi Oblast to three. The area of Kitsman Raion was split between Chernivtsi Raion and Vyzhnytsia Raion, with Mamaivtsi being transferred to Chernivtsi Raion.

== Notable people ==
- Dmytro Hnatyuk (1925–2016) – opera singer and politician
- Zirka Menzatyuk (1954) – children's book author and journalist
