= Husakove =

Village in Cherkasy Oblast, Ukraine

Husakove Гусакове
- Village
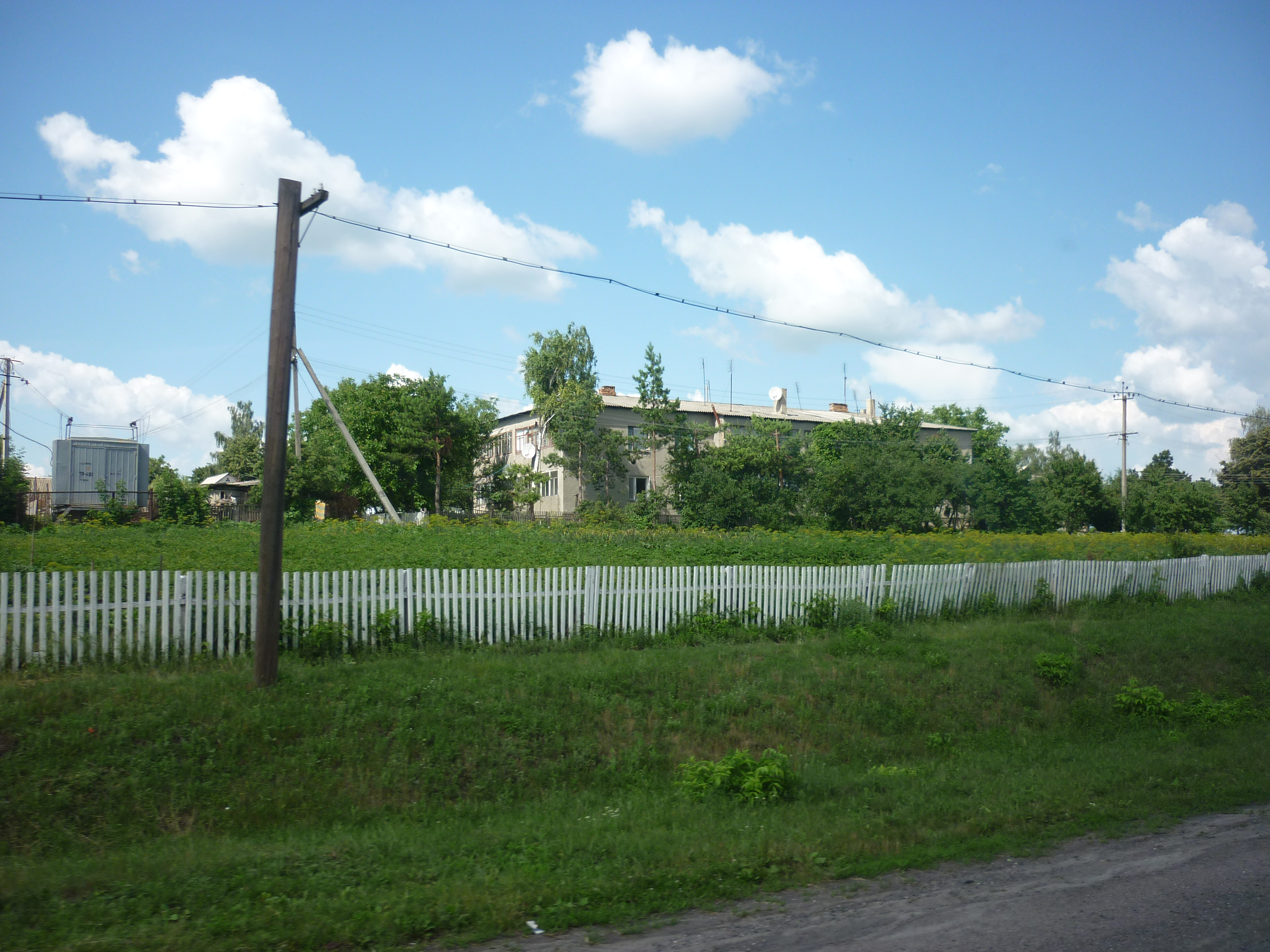

- Location of Husakove in Cherkasy Oblast Location of Husakove in Ukraine
- Coordinates: 48°59′44″N 30°49′44″E
- Country: Ukraine
- Oblast: Cherkasy Oblast
- Raion: Zvenyhorodka Raion
- Hromada: Zvenyhorodka urban hromada
- First mentioned: mid-18th century

Population
  - Total: 538

Husakove (Ukrainian: Гусакове) is a village in Zvenyhorodka urban hromada, Zvenyhorodka Raion, in Ukraine's central Cherkasy Oblast. Its population is 538 (as of 2024).

== History ==
Husakove was first mentioned in the mid-18th century. 315 local inhabitants, of whom 158 were killed, joined the Red Army during World War II; a monument to those killed was later erected. The family of Viacheslav Chornovil also briefly lived in the village during the war.

Husakove's local school was threatened with closure in 2016 due to a lack of funding. Local residents protested the proposal, arguing that it would lead to the village becoming abandoned. Protesters briefly blocked Highway H16 as part of the protest.

A local protected area is dedicated to the study of entomology.

== Notable people ==
- Valentyna Chornovil, philologist and journalist, sister of Viacheslav Chornovil
- Halyna Hnatyuk, linguist, lexicographer, and historian
- Mykhailo Ivanchenko, writer, poet, artist, and historian
- Oleksa Nehrebets'kyi, dubbing director and translator
