= Zirka Menzatyuk =

Ukrainian children's book writer

- Зірка Мензатюк
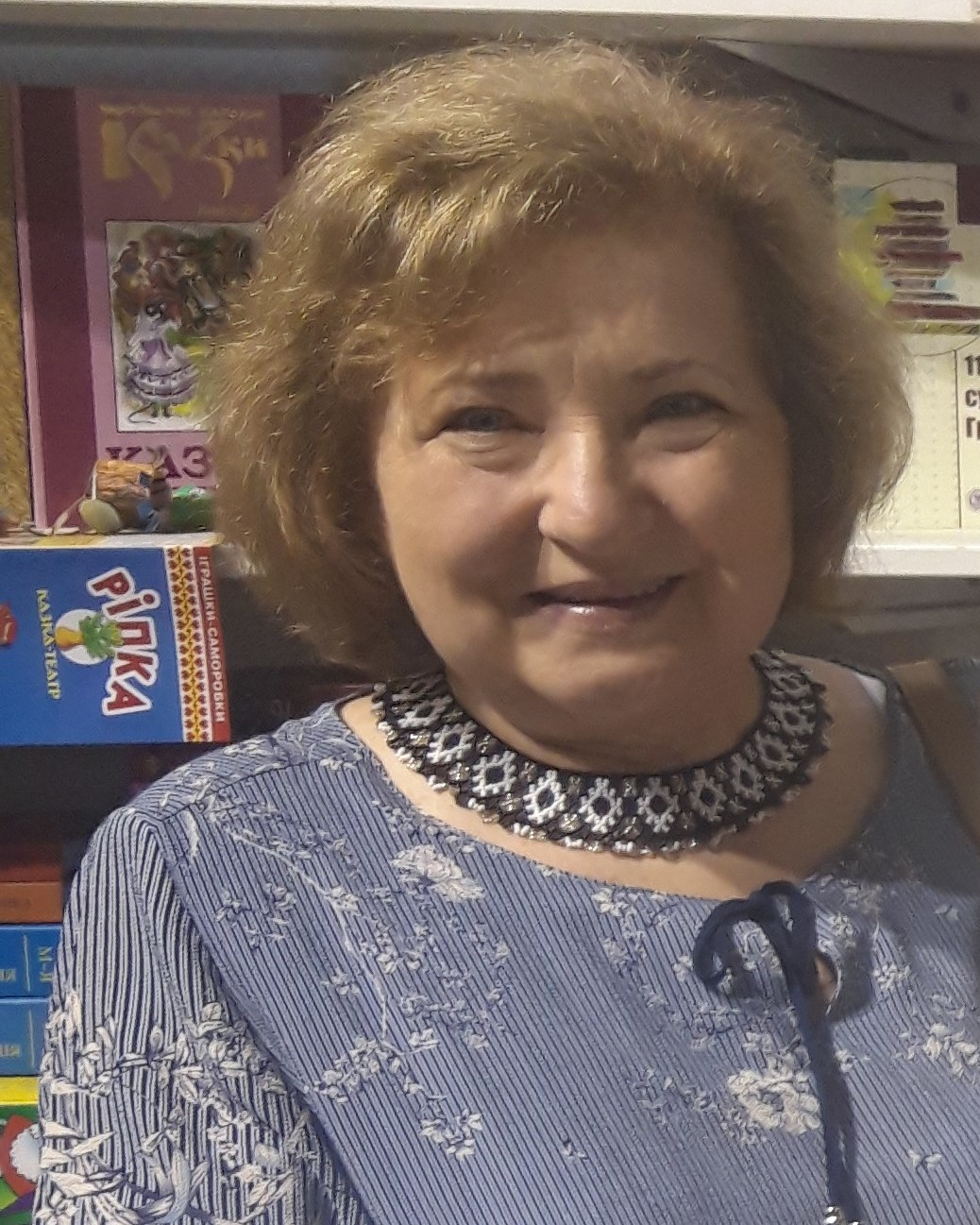
- Zirka Menzatyuk (Kyiv, 2021)
- Born: 21 October 1954 (age 71); Mamaivtsi, Ukrainian Soviet Socialist Republic (USSR) (present-day Ukraine)
- Citizenship: Ukraine
- Education: Ivan Franko University of Lviv
- Occupations: Writer, journalist

Zirka Menzatyuk (Ukrainian: Зірка Захаріївна Мензатюк; 21 October 1954) is a Ukrainian children's book author and journalist; from 1995 the Member of National Writers' Union of Ukraine. She lives and works in Kyiv.

== Biography ==
She was born in 1954 in Mamaivtsi in Chernivtsi Oblast.

After winning first place at the regional Olympics for Ukrainian language and literature, she was able to study journalism at the Ivan Franko University of Lviv from 1972 to 1977 on the recommendation of the Writers’ Union. After graduation she worked as a correspondent for various Soviet-Ukrainian newspapers in the region and nationwide. Dissatisfied with the situation of false reporting, she gave up her journalism career and as of 1988 devoted herself to writing literary texts.

== Writing career ==
The first fairy tale book of the author was published in 1990 under the title "Тисяча парасольок" (A Thousand Umbrellas). Her second book "Арніка" (Arnica, 1993) is a story about a Carpathian magic potion.

After the Ukrainian book market crisis, during which Zirka Menzatyuk published her texts in magazines, a book about famous churches and monasteries in Ukraine was published in 2002.

Zirka Menzatyuk also published a book entitled "Київські казки" (Kyiv Stories, 2006) about Kyiv and its fairy-tale aspects with heroes such as the sorceress Dobrada. In the same year, one of her the most famous book "Таємниця козацької шаблі" (The Mystery of the Cossack Sabre) was published.

== Recognition ==
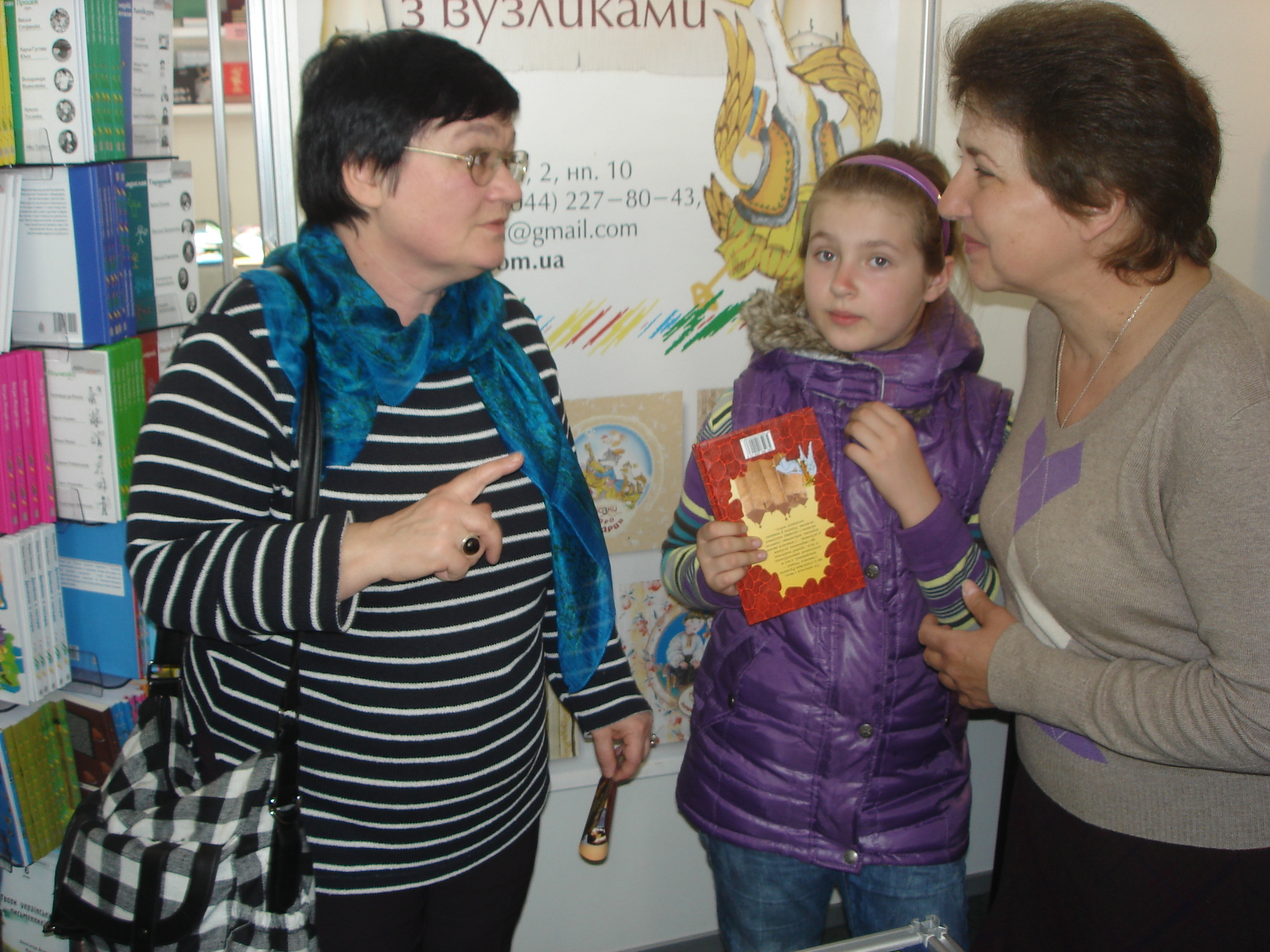
Lesya Voronyna (left) and Zirka Menzatyuk (right) in 2011

The books of Zirka Menzatyuk have been published in Ukraine and in the United States, and have been awarded the Lesia Ukrainka Prize (2007). She has received prizes in Slovakia and Poland, won the US International Literary Competition, and was awarded the Natali Zabila Literary Prize for her work (2005).

== Books ==
- Тисяча парасольок. Казки.- К.: «Веселка», 1990
- Арніка. Казка.- К.: «Веселка», 1993
- Оповідання з історії Києва. Підручник для 5 класу загальноосвітньої школи.- К.: «Гранд», 1998
- Мільйон мільйонів сестричок. Казки.- К.: «Лелека», 1999
- Наші церкви: історія, дива, легенди. Нариси для дітей середнього шкільного віку.- К.: «Соняшник», 2002
- Київські казки.- Львів: «Видавництво Старого Лева», 2006
- Kyiv Stories. Переклад Оксани Луцишиної.- Львів: «Видавництво Старого Лева», 2006
- Казочки-куцохвостики.- Львів: «Видавництво Старого Лева», 2006
- Таємниця козацької шаблі. Пригодницька повість.- Львів: «Видавництво Старого Лева», 2006
- Катрусині скарби. Оповідання,-Чернівці: «Букрек», 2007
- Як до жабок говорити. Казки.- К.: «Грані-Т», 2007
- Макове князювання. Казки.- К.: «Школа», 2008
- Український квітник. Есе.- К.: «Грані-Т», 2010, 2011
- Дочка Троянди. Драма-казка.- Острог: «Острозька академія», 2012
- Зварю тобі борщику. Казки.- Львів: «Видавництво Старого Лева», 2012
- Зелені чари. Нариси.- Чернівці, «Букрек», 2012
- Arnica. Переклад на англійську мову Стівена Кента і Віри Міченер. Електронне видання amazon.com (США), 2013.
- Як я руйнувала імперію.- Л.: «Видавництво Старого Лева», 2014
- Чарівні слова. Казочки про мову. — Чернівці: «Букрек», 2016
- Київські казки — Ранок, 2017
- Дике літо в Криму — Абабагаламага, 2018
- Ангел Золоте волосся, 2019
- Величні собори України: нариси для допитливих.- Чернівці: «Букрек», 2020
