= Zvenyhorodka =

City in Cherkasy Oblast, Ukraine

Zvenyhorodka Звенигородка
- City
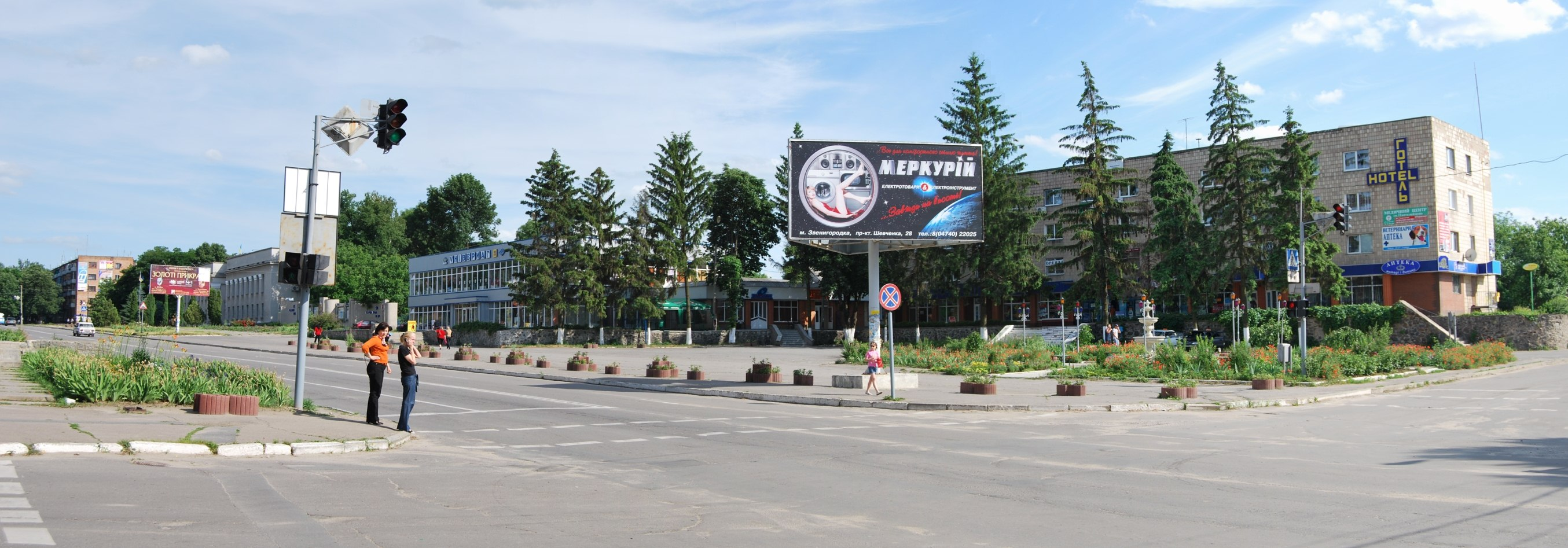
- City centre

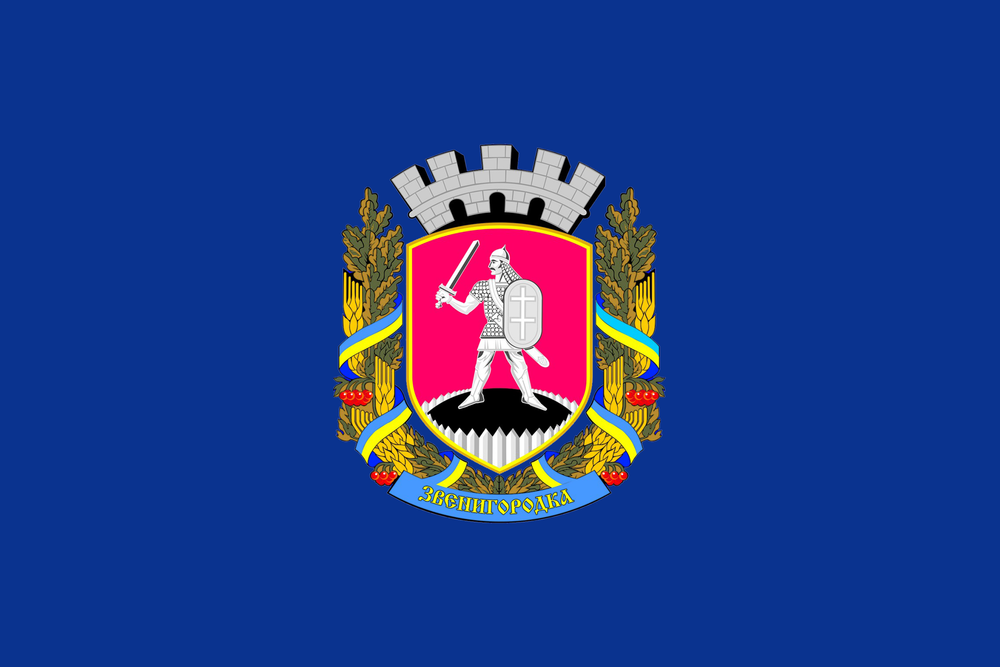
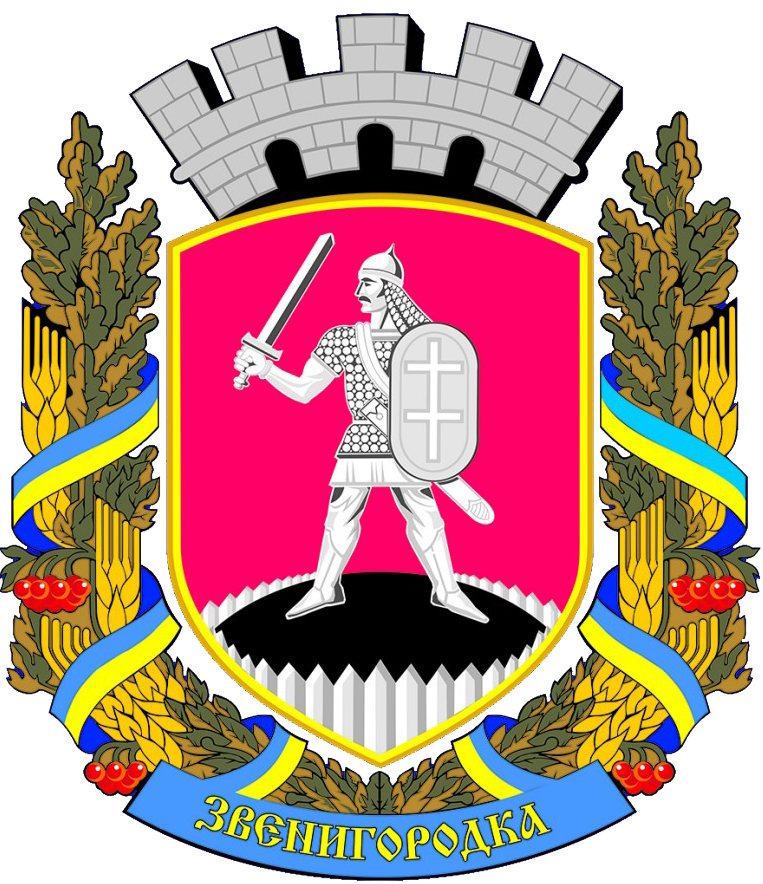
- Flag Coat of arms
- Interactive map of Zvenyhorodka
- Location of Zvenyhorodka Zvenyhorodka (Ukraine)
- Coordinates: 49°4′11″N 30°58′4″E
- Country: Ukraine
- Oblast: Cherkasy Oblast
- Raion: Zvenyhorodka Raion
- Hromada: Zvenyhorodka urban hromada
- Established: 1394
- City rights: 1938

Area
  - Total: 20.8 km^{2} (8.0 sq mi)

Population (2022)
  - Total: 16,269
- Postal code: 20200-20207
- Area code: +380 4740
- Website: www.zven.gov.ua

Zvenyhorodka (Ukrainian: Звенигородка, IPA: [zwenɪɦoˈrɔdkɐ]) is a city in Cherkasy Oblast, central Ukraine. The town is the administrative center of Zvenyhorodka Raion. It hosts the administration of Zvenyhorodka urban hromada, one of the hromadas of Ukraine. The city has a population of 16,269 (2022 estimate).

== History ==
=== Early history ===
Zvenyhorodka has its origins in the days of the Kievan Rus' and the first mention of the city dates back to 1394, although its actual origins are likely to be older, as the city was previously destroyed during the Mongol invasion of Kievan Rus'. According to modern legend, the original city was situated 3 km further from its current location, encircling a conical mountain.

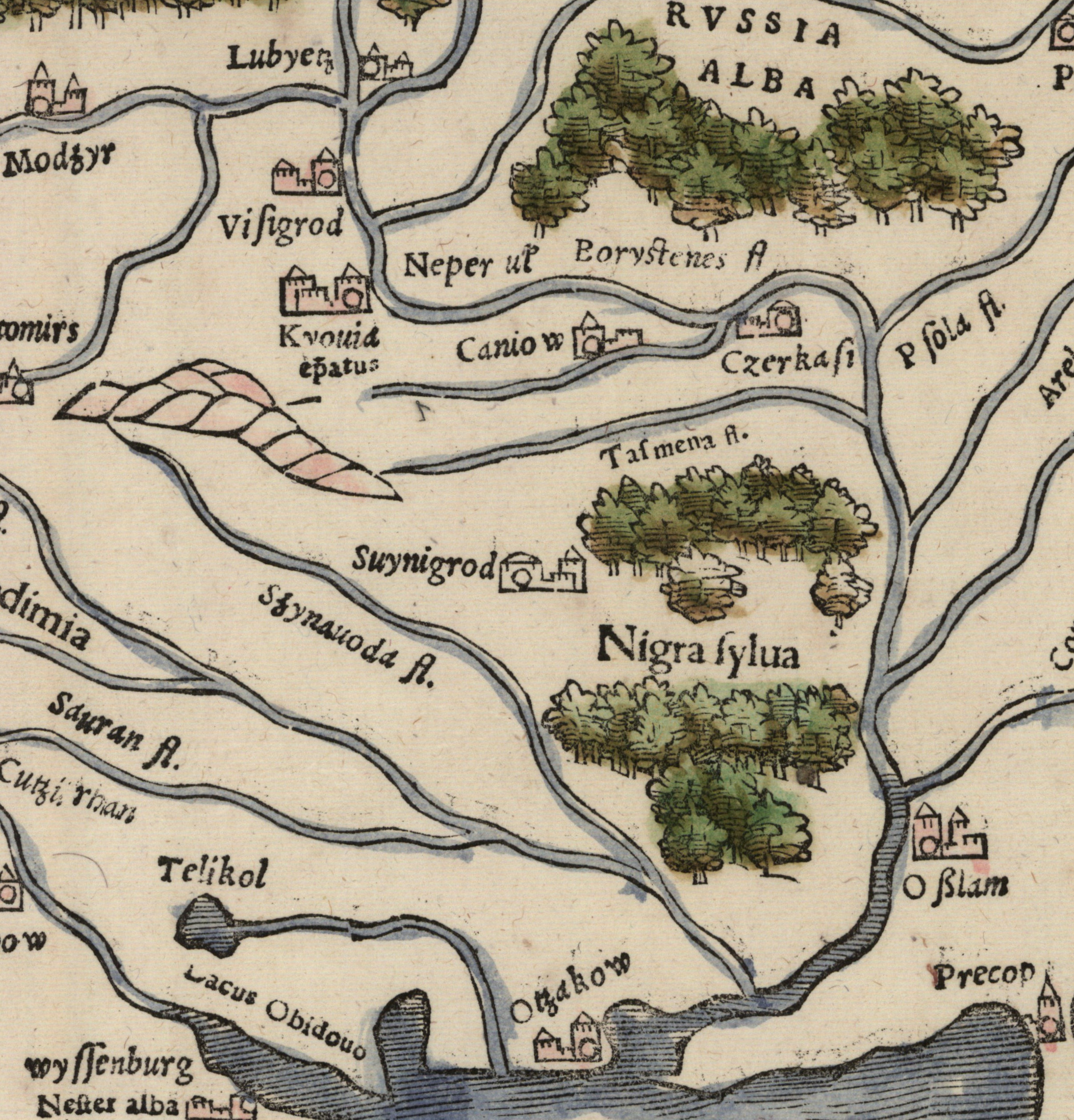
Zvenyhorodka labeled as Suynigrod in a 1552 map

In 1504 Zvenyhorodka became part of the Grand Duchy of Lithuania, after being relinquished by Meñli I Giray. It passed to the Crown of the Kingdom of Poland in 1569 following the capture of Right-bank Ukraine. Following this takeover, the population was subject to significant socio-economic oppression from the Polish aristocracy in the forms of various taxes. During the 1648–1654 Khmelnytsky Uprising, the townsfolk revolted and expelled the Polish nobility from the region. Zvenyhorodka then remained part of the Korsun Regiment, a military-territorial unit of the Hetman state, until the Polish crown regained control of Right-bank Ukraine in 1667 as per the Andrusiv Armistice.

Under Polish rule, the population suffered under socio-economic oppression again and fell victim to various national and religious hostilities. The Catholic clergy violently pursued a campaign of polarising Ukrainian nationals, which led to several uprisings in the 18th century. Haydamak forces were active in the area, led by the Cossack Hnat Holy, and they twice stormed the local castle, in 1737 and then 1743. Following these attacks, the Polish government built fortifications around the castle, including new towers and barracks.

During the Koliivshchyna rebellion in 1768, many residents of the city joined the insurgents in fighting against the Catholic church and Polish nobility, among others, due to the treatment of peasants and their serfdom. The rebellion was unsuccessful and the city remained under Polish control. In 1792 King Stanisław August Poniatowski granted Zwinogródka (as it was known in Polish) city rights under Magdeburg law and it became a royal city of Poland. In the following year it was annexed by Russia after the Second Partition of Poland.

=== Russian Empire ===
From 1796 Zvenyhorodka became an administrative centre of an uyezd in Kiev Governorate of the Russian Empire. The intensive development of trade owing to the inclusion of Zvenyhorodka in the Russian market allowed for rapid development of industries, in particularly dairy and lumber, as well as pottery and handicrafts. The city became one of the centres of the dairy industry alongside Chyhyryn and Bila Tserkva. In the 1830s the city saw considerable development including the construction of a local hospital, post office, telegraph communications, and a bridge over the river Hnylyi Tikych. Classes began at the parish school in 1833 with just over 20 students being educated and most of the population being illiterate at the time.

=== Modern history ===
Around the turn to the 20th century the town had a train station, three Greek Orthodox churches and one Roman Catholic church.

A congress of Free Cossacks took place in the town in April 1917 during the Ukrainian struggle for independence. On 1 February 1918 Zaporozhian Regiment of the Ukrainian People's Army defeated Bolshevik forces there. A local newspaper has been published in Zvenyhorodka since March 14, 1919.

During the Second World War, Zvenyhorodka was occupied by Nazi Germany from July 29, 1941 to January 28, 1944. In September 1941, a ghetto was set up here where around 1,500 Jews were shot.

== Population ==
=== Number of inhabitants in years ===
- 1850: 7, 501
- 1897: 16, 972
- 1926: 18, 020, 61% Ukrainians, 37% Jews, 1% Russians and 1% Poles.
- 1933: c. 15,000
- 1989: 22, 740
- 2013: 17, 958

=== Language ===
Distribution of the population by native language according to the 2001 census:

Language	Percentage
Ukrainian	96.36%
Russian	2.99%
other/undecided	0.65%

== Geography ==
Zvenyhorodka lies on the Hnylyi Tikych River in the Dnieper Upland.

=== Climate ===
Climate data for Zvenyhorodka (1981–2010)
Month	Jan	Feb	Mar	Apr	May	Jun	Jul	Aug	Sep	Oct	Nov	Dec	Year
Mean daily maximum °C (°F)	−1.4 (29.5)	−0.3 (31.5)	5.3 (41.5)	14.1 (57.4)	20.9 (69.6)	23.7 (74.7)	25.9 (78.6)	25.6 (78.1)	19.6 (67.3)	12.8 (55.0)	4.6 (40.3)	−0.2 (31.6)	12.6 (54.7)
Daily mean °C (°F)	−3.9 (25.0)	−3.4 (25.9)	1.4 (34.5)	8.9 (48.0)	15.2 (59.4)	18.3 (64.9)	20.3 (68.5)	19.7 (67.5)	14.2 (57.6)	8.2 (46.8)	1.8 (35.2)	−2.6 (27.3)	8.2 (46.8)
Mean daily minimum °C (°F)	−6.4 (20.5)	−6.1 (21.0)	−1.8 (28.8)	4.3 (39.7)	9.8 (49.6)	13.3 (55.9)	15.1 (59.2)	14.4 (57.9)	9.6 (49.3)	4.5 (40.1)	−0.6 (30.9)	−5.0 (23.0)	4.3 (39.7)
Average precipitation mm (inches)	35.4 (1.39)	35.0 (1.38)	33.8 (1.33)	40.2 (1.58)	51.5 (2.03)	81.1 (3.19)	73.8 (2.91)	60.7 (2.39)	54.6 (2.15)	39.0 (1.54)	45.0 (1.77)	40.1 (1.58)	590.2 (23.24)
Average precipitation days (≥ 1.0 mm)	7.4	7.1	7.0	7.8	8.3	9.0	7.9	5.8	6.9	6.2	7.5	7.6	88.5
Average relative humidity (%)	84.6	82.1	77.0	67.0	64.9	70.9	70.0	67.2	73.2	78.8	85.9	87.0	75.7
Mean monthly sunshine hours	50.9	73.9	133.2	186.8	278.6	279.4	300.8	283.5	192.6	129.0	54.5	42.0	2,005.2
Source: World Meteorological Organization

== Economy ==
Zvenyhorodka is a centre of food industry and houses a foundry.

== Notable residents ==
- Ahatanhel Krymsky (1871–1942), Ukrainian philologist and orientalist.
- David Günzburg (1857–1910), Russian orientalist and Jewish communal leader.
- Horace Günzburg (1833–1909), Russian philanthropist.
- Grigory Petrovich Nikulin (1895–1965), Russian Bolshevik and Chekist.
- Yurii Karmazin (1957-2022), Ukrainian politician.

== See also ==
- List of cities in Ukraine

== Gallery ==
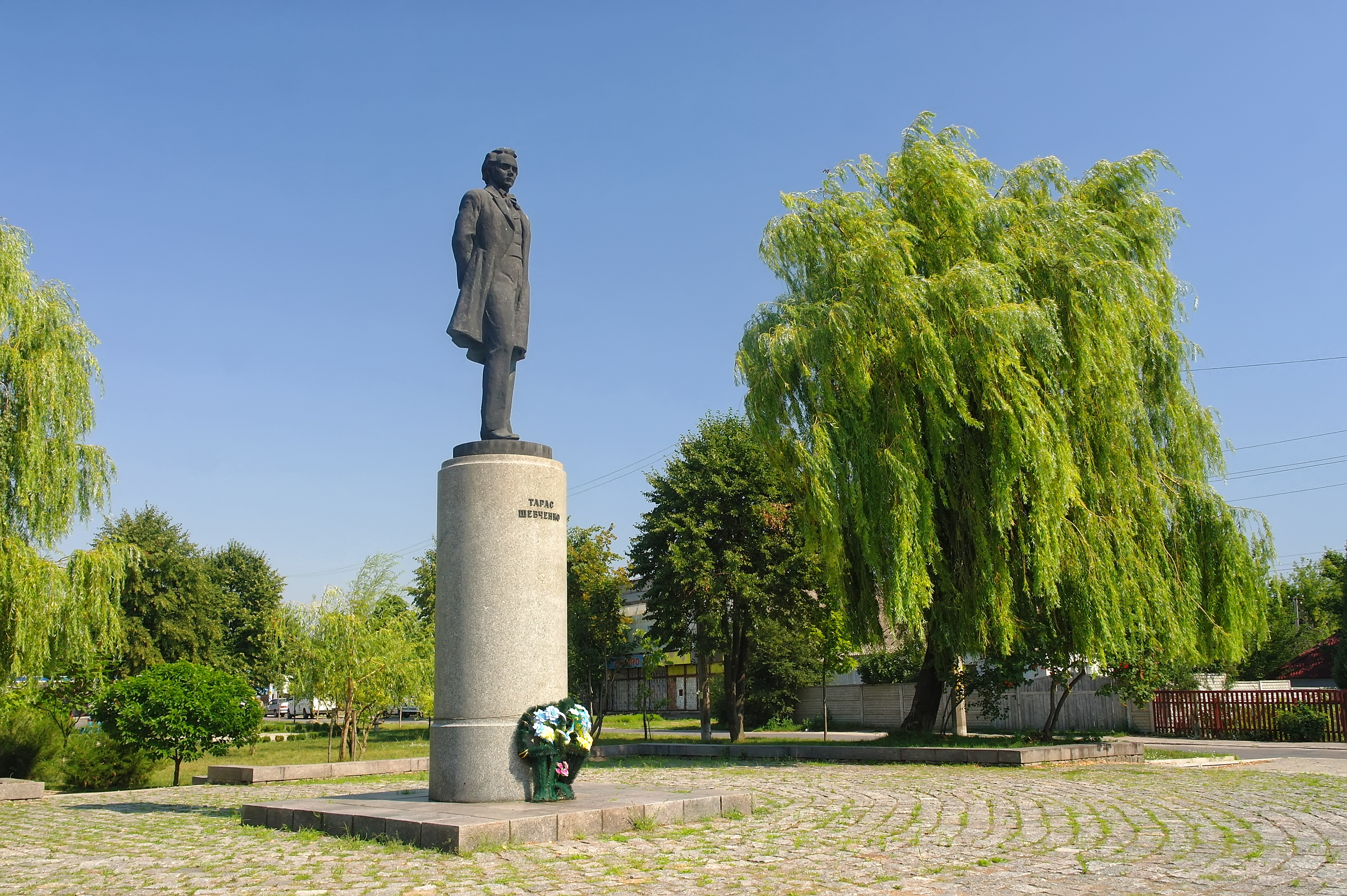
Taras Shevchenko monument

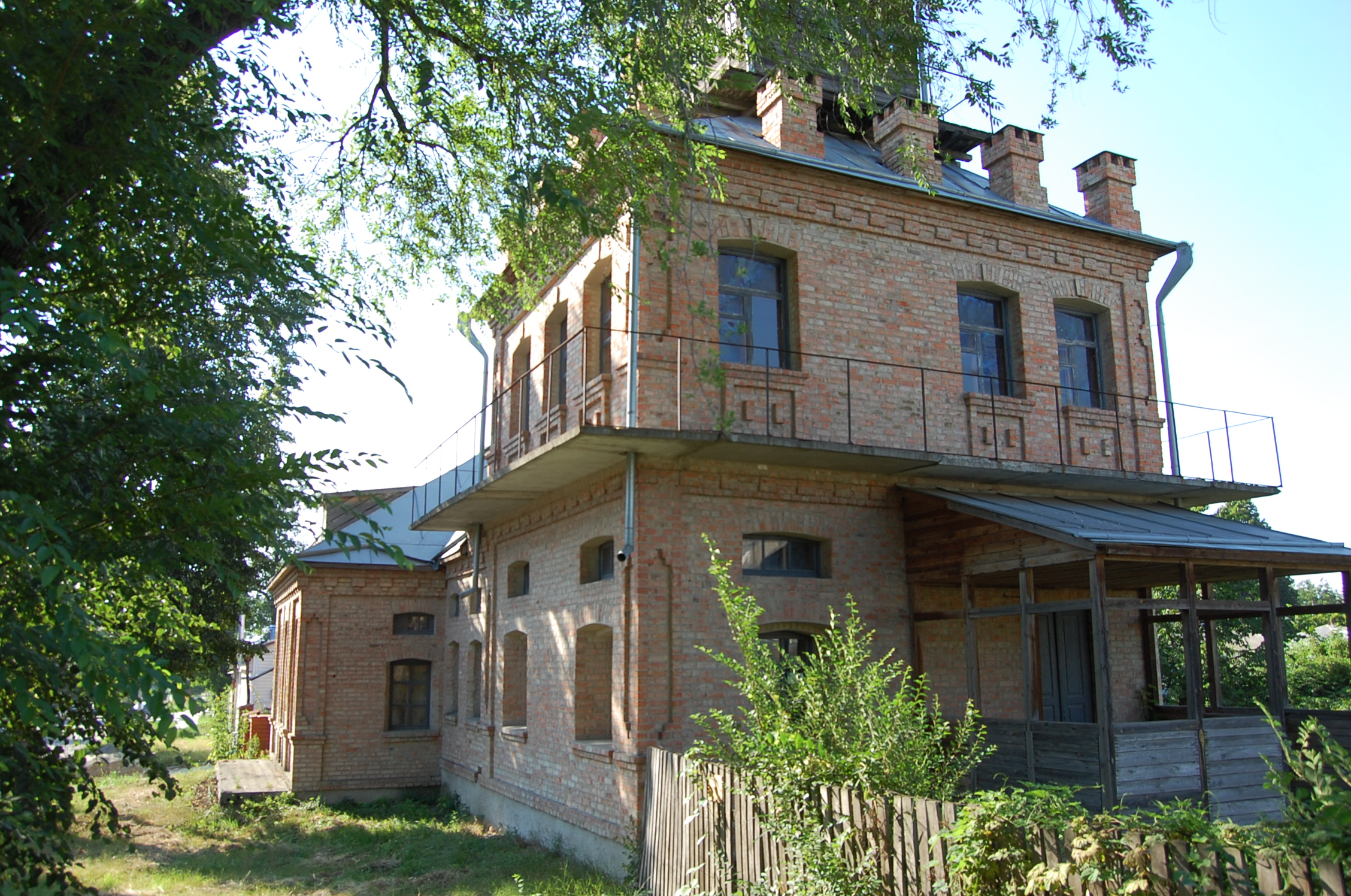
Ahatanhel Krymsky Museum

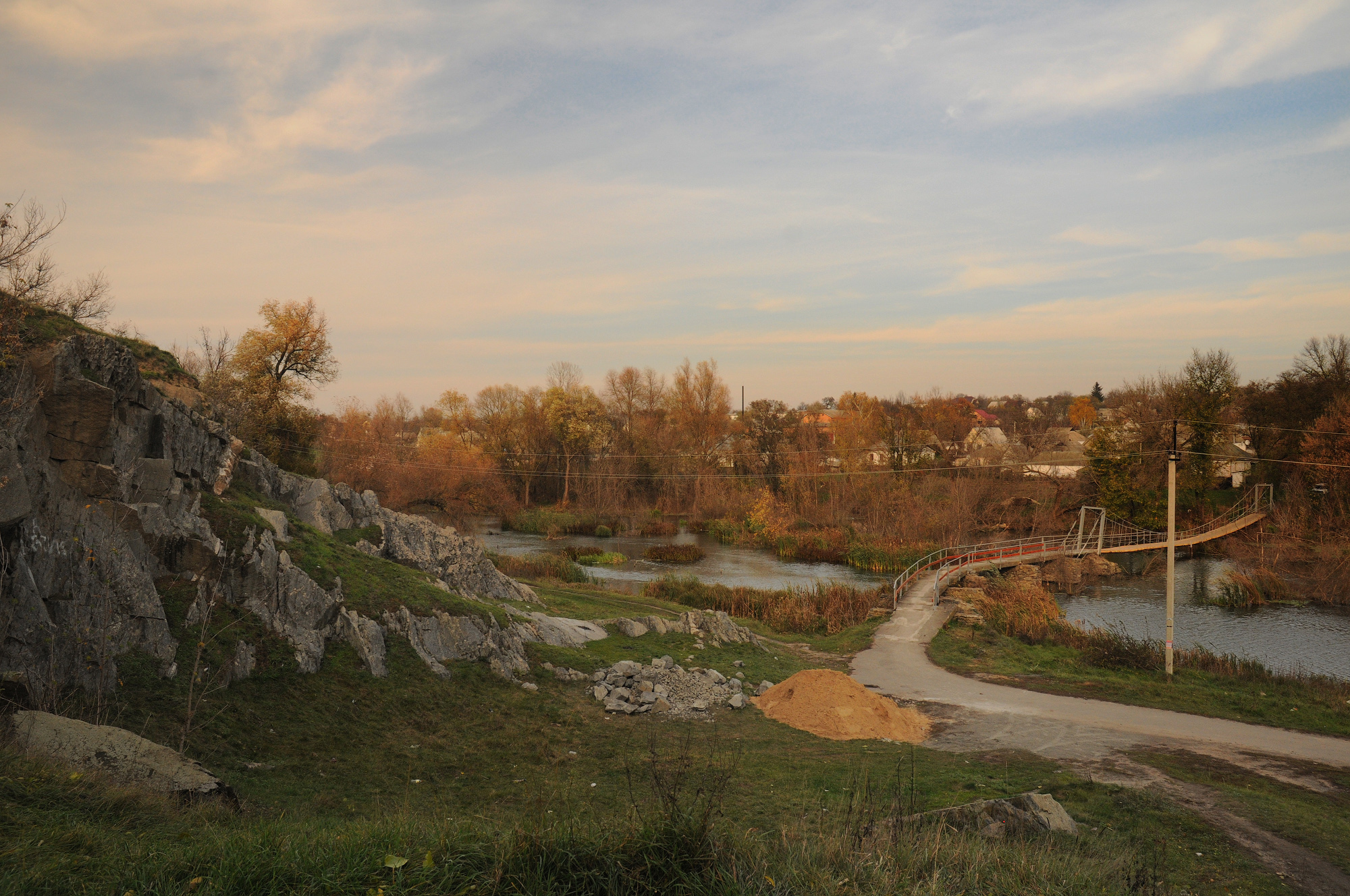
Zvenyhorodka Conglomerate geologic landmark
