= Oleksa Nehrebets'kyi =

Ukrainian dubbing director, editor, and translator

- Олекса Негребецький
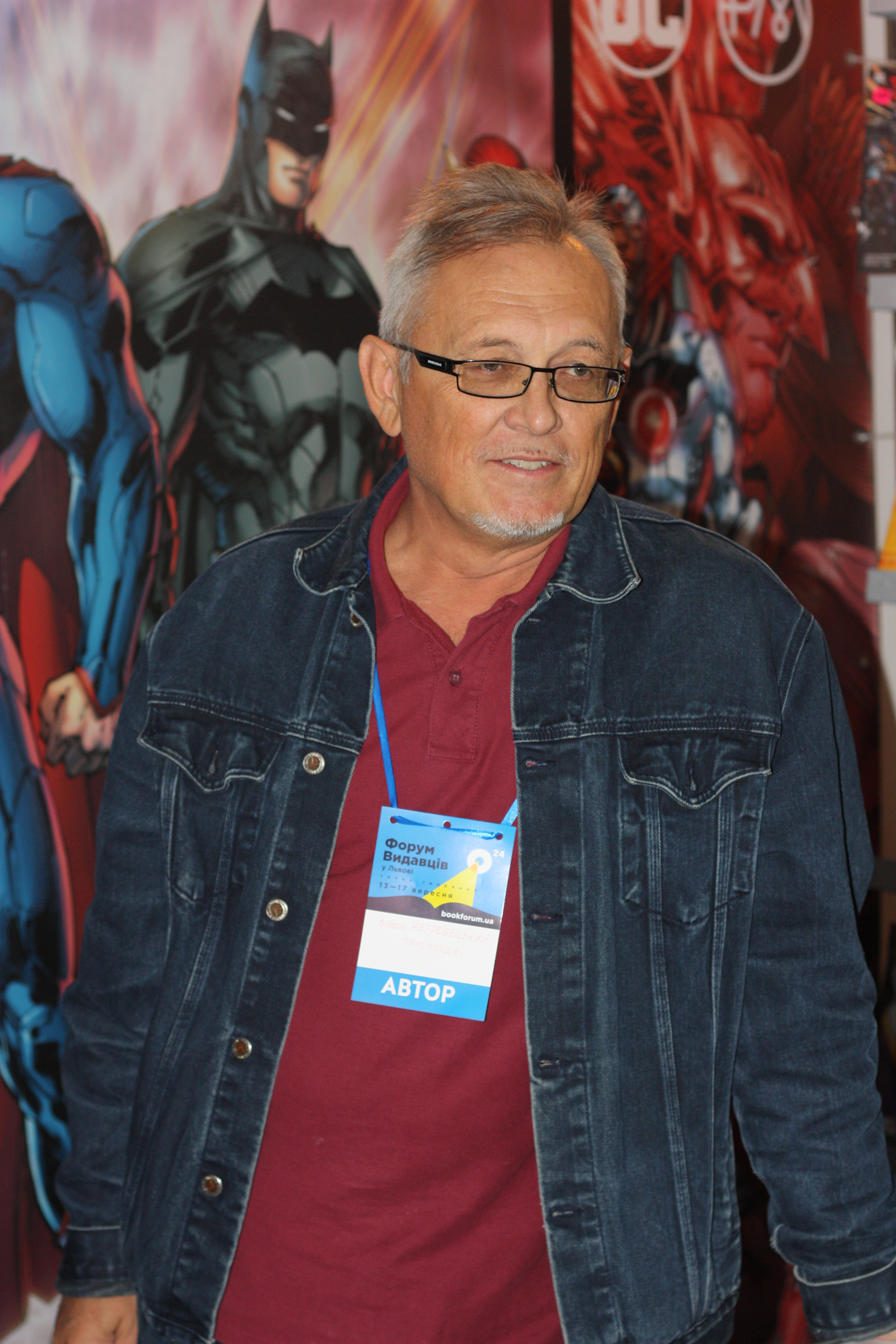
- Nehrebets'kyi in 2017
- Born: Leonid Yuriiovych Dmytrenko; 30 October 1955 (age 70); Husakove, Ukrainian SSR, Soviet Union (now Ukraine)
- Education: Taras Shevchenko National University of Kyiv
- Occupations: Dubbing director; editor; translator
- Years active: 1994–present
- Notable work: Coraline; Paul; Ted; (translations)

Leonid Yuriiovych Dmytrenko (Ukrainian: Леонід Юрійович Дмитре́нко; born 30 October 1955), better known by the pseudonym Oleksa Nehrebets'kyi (Ukrainian: Оле́кса Негребе́цький), is a Ukrainian dubbing director, editor and translator who works mainly with feature films.

== Career ==
Nehrebets'kyi is a graduate of the biological faculty in Taras Shevchenko National University of Kyiv, 1978. From 1998 to 2002 he studied at the university's faculty of philology. Since 1994 he has worked as a writer and freelance translator.

By his efforts such famous films as ALF (TV series), Pirates of the Caribbean, Shrek, the animated series Thomas the Tank Engine & Friends, Teletubbies, the animated film Cars, Open Season, Flushed Away, The Adventures of Despereaux and Happy Feet were translated into Ukrainian. He collaborated with editing books of J. K. Rowling's Harry Potter series. In 2002-2003 he worked as a screenwriter of radio series called "The Life in distance of ten minutes". He also translated David Mitchell's novel Number 9 Dream. In 2009 he became dubbing director and author of the translation of the film Enemies of Society with Johnny Depp in the leading role.

Among his best known translations are Coraline, Paul, and Ted.

== Translation for cinema ==
- Cars
- Pirates of the Caribbean: Dead Man's Chest
- Pirates of the Caribbean: At World's End
- Charlie Wilson's War
- Children of Men
- Coralline in the Land of Nightmares
- Flushed Away
- Happy Feet
- Eragon
- I Now Pronounce You Chuck & Larry
- Harry Potter and the Order of the Phoenix
- G.I. Joe
- Madagascar 2
- Robinson Family
- Open Season
- Kung Fu Panda
- Kung Fu Panda 2
- Shrek
- Shrek Forever After
- Stardust
- The Spiderwick Chronicles
- The Holiday
- Wild Hogs
- Top

== Translator and director of dubbing ==
- Love without rules
- You Don't Mess With the Zohan
- The Adventures of Despereaux
- Helboy: The Golden Army
- I love you, man
- Katyń
- The Unborn
- Johnny D.
- Rock wave
- Dilemma
- Paul;
- The Smurfs
- Anonym
- Arthur Christmas
- Ted and others.

== TV series translation ==
- Thomas & Friends
- Alf
- Friends

== Author of scripts ==
- 2009 - The television series "Only Love" (1+1) - editor, dialogues author, scriptwriter of last series
- 2004-2008 - Sunday poetical TV lottery "Patriot" (1st National)
- 2003-2004 - Daily radio serial "Life in distance of 10 minutes"

== Books translation ==
- Rudyard Kipling "Just so stories"
- Marina Lewycka "From Tractors to Caravan", " Various Pets Alive and Dead "
- David Mitchell "Number 9 Dream"
