= Padraic Kenney =

American historian

- Born: Padraic Jeremiah Kenney; 1963 (age 62–63)
- Occupation: Historian

Academic background
- Education: UMich

Academic work
- Discipline: History
- Sub-discipline: History of Poland
- Institutions: CU Boulder; IU
- Website: Publications by Padraic Kenney at ResearchGate

Padraic Jeremiah Kenney (born 1963) is an American writer, historian, and educator. He was dean of the University of Kentucky's graduate school until May 2025. Previously Kenney was professor of history and International Studies at Indiana University (IU). At IU, he served as an Associate Dean for Social and Historical Sciences and Graduate Education in the College of Arts and Sciences; he also served a two-year tenure as director of Collins Living-Learning Center from 2018 to 2020. Previously, he was Professor of History at the University of Colorado, Boulder. He graduated from Harvard College (BA), University of Toronto (MA), and the University of Michigan (PhD).

He is the author of several books on East European (particularly Polish) history and politics; his area of specialization is social change and political change in the contemporary world, in particular civil resistance to authoritarian regimes and democratic revolutions. His most recent book, Dance in Chains: Political Imprisonment in the Modern World (Oxford, 2017), examines political prisoners and imprisoning regimes from the mid-19th century, in particular in Ireland, Northern Ireland, Poland, and South Africa, as well as the men detained at Guantanamo Bay. His 2002 work, A Carnival of Revolution: Central Europe, 1989 (Princeton), has been translated into Polish, Ukrainian, Romanian, and Czech. A history of post-communism, Burdens of Freedom: Eastern Europe Since 1989 (Zed Books), was translated into Croatian and Italian.

In 2016, he was president of the Association for Slavic, East European, and Eurasian Studies (ASEEES).

He is a frequent contributor to the Polish online weekly Kultura liberalna. Other essays have appeared in The New York Times, The Boston Globe, and The Denver Post.

He was awarded a grant under the Fulbright Program in 2005.

== Selected publications ==
- Dance in Chains: Political Imprisonment in the Modern World, Oxford University Press, 2017, ISBN 978-0-199-37574-5
- The Burdens of Freedom: Eastern Europe Since 1989, Zed Books, 2006, ISBN 1-84277-663-0
- Partisan Histories: The Past in Contemporary Global Politics (coeditor), Palgrave Macmillan, 2005, ISBN 1-4039-6456-4
- A Carnival of Revolution: Central Europe 1989, Princeton University Press, 2002, ISBN 0-691-05028-7
- Rebuilding Poland: Workers and Communists, 1945-1950, Cornell University Press, 1996, ISBN 0-8014-3287-1
