= Dmytro Hnatyuk =

Soviet and Ukrainian singer and politician

Hero of Ukraine People's Artist Dmytro Hnatyuk
- Дмитро Гнатюк
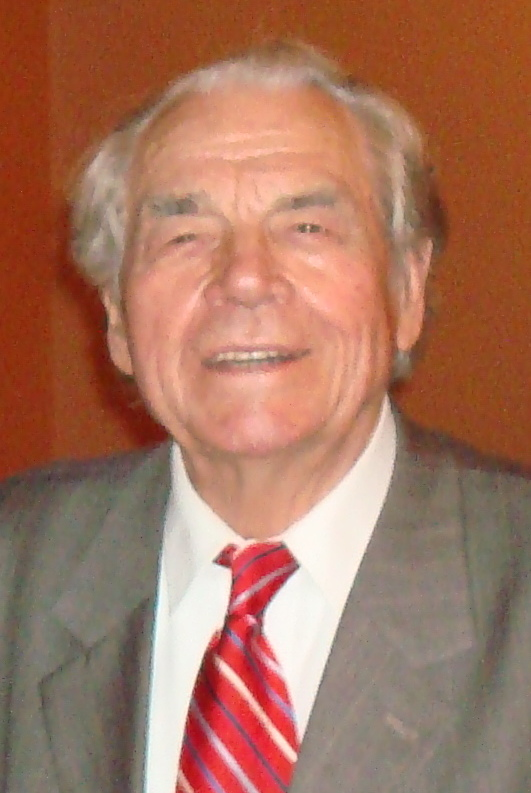
- Born: 28 March 1925; Mămăești, Romania (present-day Mamaivtsi, Ukraine)
- Died: 29 April 2016 (aged 91); Kyiv, Ukraine
- Education: Kyiv Conservatory
- Occupations: Opera singer; politician
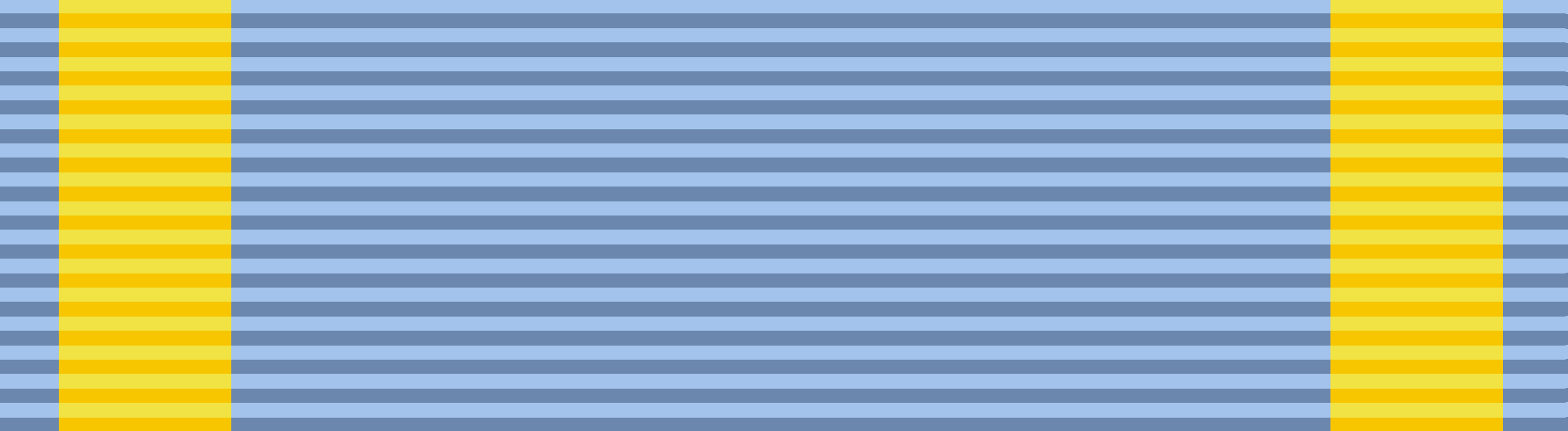
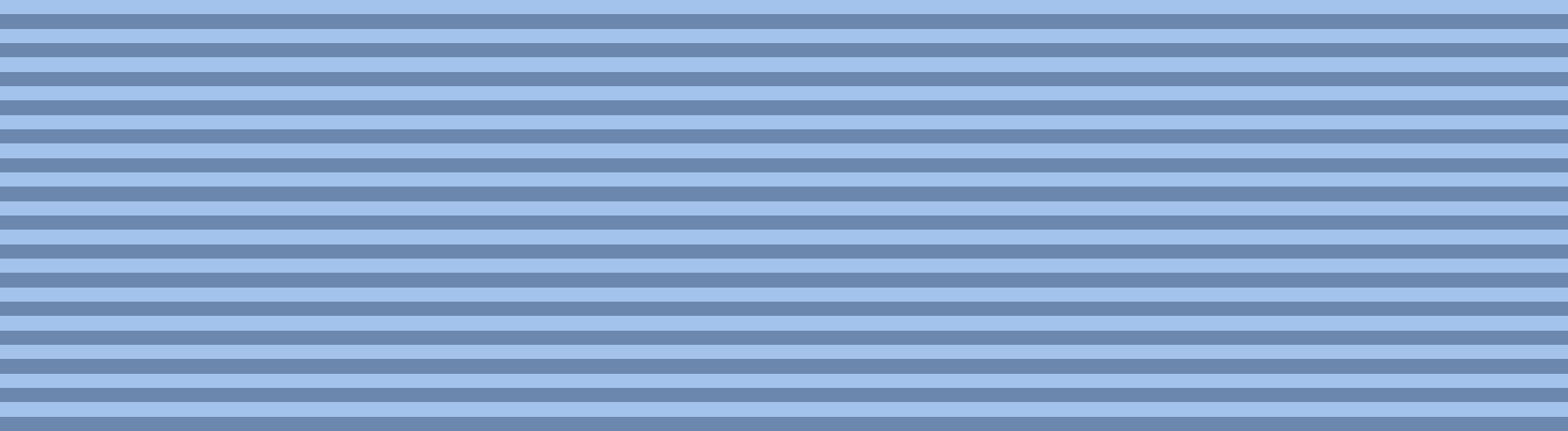
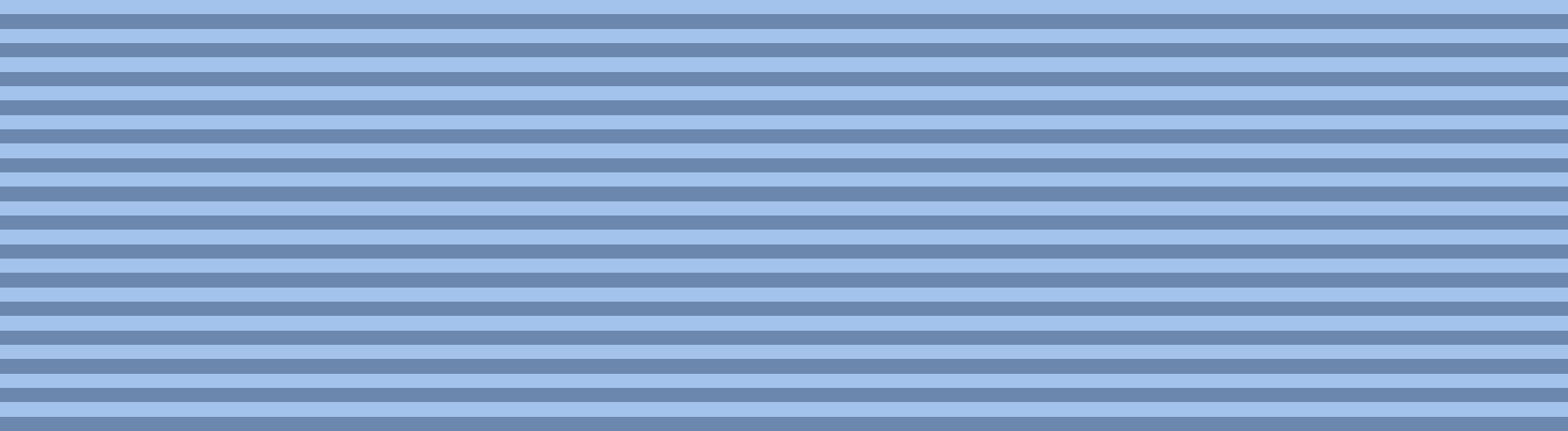
- Awards: Shevchenko National Prize

Dmytro Hnatyuk (Dmytro Mykhailovych Hnatyuk, (Note: Ukrainian: Дмитро Михайлович Гнатюк, romanized: Dmytro Mykhailovych Hnatiuk) (28 March 1925 – 29 April 2016) was a Soviet and Ukrainian baritone opera singer and a former member of the Ukrainian Parliament.

== Biography ==
Dmytro Hnatyuk was born on 28 March 1925 in the village of Mămăești, Sipeniț district, Cernăuți County, Romania. He graduated from a Romanian-language school and then from the Kyiv Conservatory in 1951 as an opera and chamber singer.

He was a singer at the Kiev Opera and Ballet Theatre appearing as a soloist in many songs. In 1979, Hnatyuk graduated from the State Institute and of Theatrical Arts as a Director (rezhyser). From 1951 to 1988, he worked as an opera singer and from 1975 also as a director of the State Academic Theatre of Opera and Ballet, as well working as a trainer of the National Academic Theatre. In 1988, he became the director of the State Academic Theatre of Opera and Ballet. Hnatyuk sang in many operas by Ukrainian and worldwide composers.

Hnatyuk was a member of the Supreme Soviet of the Soviet Union (8th–10th sessions) from 1972 to 1984. He also was a member of the Ukrainian Parliament from 1998 to 2002. He had been elected into parliament as member of Hromada. Early 1999 he switched to the Hromada breakaway faction "Fatherland". Early 2001 he again moved to another faction in parliament, this time to Labour Ukraine.

Hnatyuk was elected the head of the Musical Society of Ukraine, as the head of the Kiyvan Theatrical Society, as a member of the Committee of State Shevchenko Prizes, the Committee of Defense and Peace and others. Member of the Board of the All Ukrainian Fund of Recreating Memorials of the Historical-Architectural Heritage in the name of O. Honchar, a member of the Board of the Fund of Influence of Development of Arts; the Committee "Ukraine-Europe".

Hnatyuk died on 29 April 2016. He was buried at Kyiv's Baikove Cemetery.

== Family ==
Dmytro Hnatyuk was married to Doctor of Philological Sciences and historian of Ukrainian language Halyna Hnatyuk.

== Awards ==
Hnatyuk was a People's Artist of Ukraine, was a People's Artist of the Ukrainian SSR, an "Academic" of the Academy of Arts of Ukraine, and a professor of the Tchaikovsky Music Academy. In 2005 he was awarded with the Hero of Ukraine, the highest decoration of Ukraine. He received many Soviet awards including Hero of Socialist Labor and the USSR State Prize.

In 1960 he had also been granted the title of the People's Artist of the USSR.

- Hero of Ukraine (March 28, 2005).
- Order of Prince Yaroslav the Wise 3rd class (March 27, 2015).
- Order of Prince Yaroslav the Wise 4th class (January 16, 2009).
- Order of Prince Yaroslav the Wise 5th class (March 28, 2000).
