= Halyna Hnatyuk =

Ukrainian linguist, lexicographer, and philologist (1927–2016)

- Галина Гнатюк
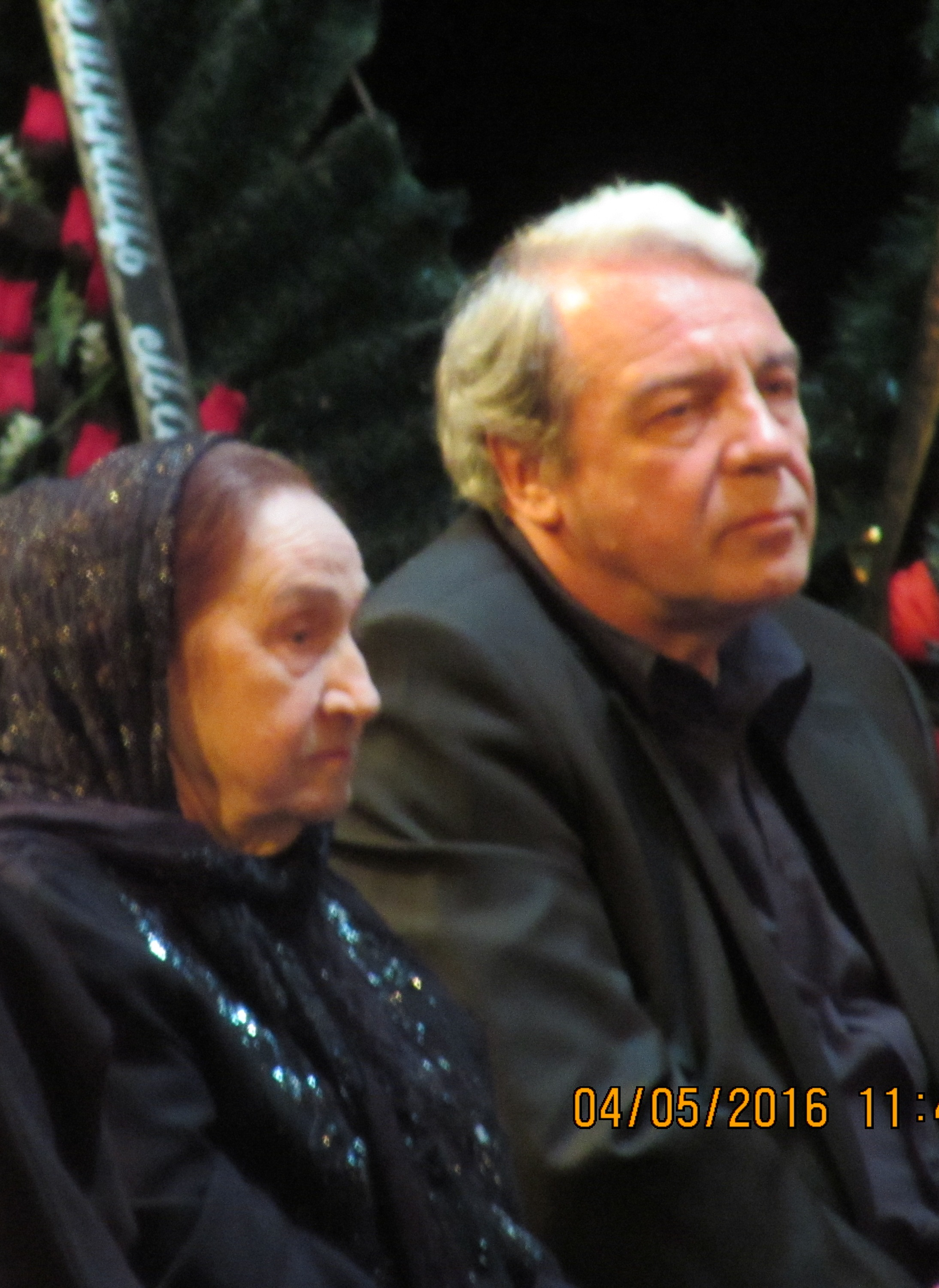
- Halyna Hnatyuk with her son Andriy at the funeral of her husband Dmytro
- Born: 26 December 1927; Husakove, Ukrainian SSR, Soviet Union
- Died: 20 June 2016 (aged 88); Kyiv, Ukraine
- Education: Taras Shevchenko University of Kyiv
- Occupations: Linguist; lexicographer; philologist

Halyna Makarivna Hnatyuk (Ukrainian: Галина Макарівна Гнатюк; 20 June 1927 – 26 December 2016) was a Ukrainian linguist, lexicographer, and philologist who was a research fellow of the Potebnia Institute of Linguistics from 1956 to 1992.

Hnatyuk is primarily accredited as co-editor and co-author of the Ukrainian language dictionary published in 1970s. In 1983 all members of the Potebnia Institute of Lingual Studies who worked on the dictionary including Hnatyuk received the USSR State Prize.

She was a wife of Ukrainian singer Dmytro Hnatyuk.

== Published works ==
- Russian-Ukrainian literary and lingual relations in the second half of the 18th century – the first quarter of the 19th century. Kyiv, 1957 [Російсько-українські літературно-мовні зв’язки в другій половині XVIII – першій чверті XIX ст. К., 1957];
- Russian-Ukrainian technical dictionary. Kyiv, 1961 (co-author) [Російсько-український технічний словник. К., 1961 (співавт.)];
- Questions of terminology. Moscow, 1961 (co-author) [Вопросы терминологии. Москва, 1961 (співавт.)];
- Philosophical questions of linguistics. Kyiv, 1972 (co-author) [Філософські питання мовознавства. К., 1972 (співавт.)];
- Word and phraseology in dictionary. Kyiv, 1980 [Слово і фразеологізм у словнику. К., 1980];
- Participle in the modern Ukrainian literal language. Kyiv, 1982 [Дієприкметник у сучасній українській літературній мові. К., 1982].
