= List of hromadas of Ukraine =

There are 1,469 hromadas (Ukrainian: територіальна громада, romanized: terytorialna hromada, lit. 'territorial community') (Note: «Громада» is the singular Ukrainian word for hromada. The plural word for hromadas is «громади» (hromady).) in Ukraine. They were formed in 2020 (there are no hromadas in Kyiv, Sevastopol and in the Autonomous Republic of Crimea). A hromada is designated urban hromada if its administration is located in a city; settlement hromada if it is located in a rural settlement (selyshche), and rural hromada if it is located in a selo.

== Cherkasy Oblast ==
Hromada	Type	Center	Raion	Raion before 2020
Babanka	settlement	Babanka	Uman	Uman
Balakleia	rural	Balakleia	Cherkasy	Smila
Bashtechky	rural	Bashtechky	Uman	Zhashkiv
Berezniaky	rural	Berezniaky	Cherkasy	Smila
Biloziria	rural	Biloziria	Cherkasy	Cherkasy
Bobrytsia	rural	Bobrytsia	Cherkasy	Kaniv
Budyshche	rural	Budyshche	Cherkasy	Cherkasy
Buky	settlement	Buky	Uman	Mankivka
Buzhanka	rural	Buzhanka	Zvenyhorodka	Lysianka
Cherkasy	urban	Cherkasy	Cherkasy	Cherkasy municipality
Chervona Sloboda	rural	Chervona Sloboda	Cherkasy	Cherkasy
Chornobai	settlement	Chornobai	Zolotonosha	Chornobai
Chyhyryn	urban	Chyhyryn	Cherkasy	Chyhyryn
Dmytrushky	rural	Dmytrushky	Uman	Uman
Drabiv	settlement	Drabiv	Zolotonosha	Drabiv
Helmiaziv	rural	Helmiaziv	Zolotonosha	Zolotonosha
Horodyshche	urban	Horodyshche	Cherkasy	Horodyshche
Irkliiv	rural	Irkliiv	Zolotonosha	Chornobai
Ivanky	rural	Ivanky	Uman	Mankivka
Kamianka	urban	Kamianka	Cherkasy	Kamianka
Kaniv	urban	Kaniv	Cherkasy	city of Kaniv
Katerynopil	settlement	Kalynopil	Zvenyhorodka	Katerynopil
Khrystynivka	urban	Khrystynivka	Uman	Khrystynivka
Korsun-Shevchenkivskyi	urban	Korsun-Shevchenkivskyi	Cherkasy	Korsun-Shevchenkivskyi
Ladyzhynka	rural	Ladyzhynka	Uman	Uman
Lesky	rural	Lesky	Cherkasy	Cherkasy
Lipliave	rural	Lipliave	Cherkasy	Kaniv
Lypianka	rural	Lypianka	Zvenyhorodka	Shpola
Lysianka	settlement	Lysianka	Zvenyhorodka	Lysianka
Mankivka	settlement	Mankivka	Uman	Mankivka
Matusiv	rural	Matusiv	Zvenyhorodka	Shpola
Medvedivka	rural	Medvedivka	Cherkasy	Chyhyryn
Mliiv	rural	Mliiv	Cherkasy	Horodyshche
Mokra Kalyhirka	rural	Mokra Kalyhirka	Zvenyhorodka	Katerynopil
Monastyryshche	urban	Monastyryshche	Uman	Monastyryshche
Moshny	rural	Moshny	Cherkasy	Cherkasy
Mykhailivka	rural	Mykhailivka	Cherkasy	Kamianka
Nabutiv	rural	Nabutiv	Cherkasy	Korsun-Shevchenkivskyi
Nova Dmytrivka	rural	Nova Dmytrivka	Zolotonosha	Zolotonosha
Palanka	rural	Palanka	Uman	Uman
Pishchane	rural	Pishchane	Zolotonosha	Zolotonosha
Rotmistrivka	rural	Rotmistrivka	Cherkasy	Smila
Ruska Poliana	rural	Ruska Poliana	Cherkasy	Cherkasy
Sahunivka	rural	Sahunivka	Cherkasy	Cherkasy
Selyshche	rural	Selyshche	Zvenyhorodka	Korsun-Shevchenkivskyi
Shevchenkove	rural	Shevchenkove	Zvenyhorodka	Zvenyhorodka
Shpola	urban	Shpola	Zvenyhorodka	Shpola
Shramkivka	rural	Shramkivka	Zolotonosha	Drabiv
Smila	urban	Smila	Cherkasy	Smila municipality
Stebliv	settlement	Stebliv	Zvenyhorodka	Korsun-Shevchenkivskyi
Stepanky	rural	Stepanky	Cherkasy	Cherkasy
Stepantsi	rural	Stepantsi	Cherkasy	Kaniv
Talne	urban	Talne	Zvenyhorodka	Talne
Ternivka	rural	Ternivka	Cherkasy	Smila
Uman	urban	Uman	Uman	city of Uman
Vatutine	urban	Vatutine	Zvenyhorodka	Vatutine municipality
Velyky Khutir	rural	Velyky Khutir	Zolotonosha	Drabiv
Vilshana	settlement	Vilshana	Zvenyhorodka	Horodyshche
Vodianyky	rural	Vodianyky	Zvenyhorodka	Zvenyhorodka
Voznesenske	rural	Voznesenske	Zolotonosha	Zolotonosha
Vynohrad	rural	Vynohrad	Zvenyhorodka	Lysianka
Yerky	settlement	Yerky	Zvenyhorodka	Katerynopil
Zhashkiv	urban	Zhashkiv	Uman	Zhashkiv
Zolotonosha	urban	Zolotonosha	Zolotonosha	Zolotonosha municipality
Zorivka	rural	Zorivka	Zolotonosha	Zolotonosha
Zvenyhorodka	urban	Zvenyhorodka	Zvenyhorodka	Zvenyhorodka

== Chernihiv Oblast ==
Hromada	Type	Center	Raion	Raion before 2020
Bakhmach	urban	Bakhmach	Nizhyn	Bakhmach
Baturyn	urban	Baturyn	Nizhyn	Bakhmach
Berezna	settlement	Berezna	Chernihiv	Mena
Bobrovytsia	urban	Bobrovytsia	Nizhyn	Bobrovytsia
Borzna	urban	Borzna	Nizhyn	Borzna
Chernihiv	urban	Chernihiv	Chernihiv	city of Chernihiv
Desna	settlement	Desna	Chernihiv	Kozelets
Dmytrivka	settlement	Dmytrivka	Nizhyn	Bakhmach
Dobrianka	settlement	Dobrianka	Chernihiv	Ripky
Honcharivske	settlement	Honcharivske	Chernihiv	Chernihiv
Horodnia	urban	Horodnia	Chernihiv	Horodnia
Ichnia	urban	Ichnia	Pryluky	Ichnia
Ivanivka	rural	Ivanivka	Chernihiv	Chernihiv
Kholmy	settlement	Kholmy	Koriukivka	Koriukivka
Kipti	rural	Kipti	Chernihiv	Kozelets
Komarivka	rural	Komarivka	Nizhyn	Borzna
Koriukivka	urban	Koriukivka	Koriukivka	Koriukivka
Korop	settlement	Korop	Novhorod-Siverskyi	Korop
Kozelets	settlement	Kozelets	Chernihiv	Kozelets
Kruty	rural	Kruty	Nizhyn	Nizhyn
Kulykivka	settlement	Kulykivka	Chernihiv	Kulykivka
Kyinka	rural	Kyinka	Chernihiv	Chernihiv
Kyselivka	rural	Kyselivka	Chernihiv	Chernihiv
Ladan	settlement	Ladan	Pryluky	Pryluky
Liubech	settlement	Liubech	Chernihiv	Ripky
Losynivka	settlement	Losynivka	Nizhyn	Nizhyn
Lynovytsia	settlement	Lynovytsia	Pryluky	Pryluky
Makiivka	rural	Makiivka	Nizhyn	Nosivka
Mala Divytsia	settlement	Mala Divytsia	Pryluky	Pryluky
Mena	urban	Mena	Koriukivka	Mena
Mryn	rural	Mryn	Nizhyn	Nosivka
Mykhailo-Kotsiubynske	settlement	Mykhailo-Kotsiubynske	Chernihiv	Chernihiv
Nizhyn	urban	Nizhyn	Nizhyn	city of Nizhyn
Nosivka	urban	Nosivka	Nizhyn	Nosivka
Nova Basan	rural	Nova Basan	Nizhyn	Bobrovytsia
Novhorod-Siverskyi	urban	Novhorod-Siverskyi	Novhorod-Siverskyi	Novhorod-Siverskyi; Novhorod-Siverskyi municipality
Novy Bilous	rural	Novy Bilous	Chernihiv	Chernihiv
Olyshivka	settlement	Olyshivka	Chernihiv	Chernihiv
Oster	urban	Oster	Chernihiv	Kozelets
Parafiivka	settlement	Parafiivka	Pryluky	Ichnia
Plysky	rural	Plysky	Nizhyn	Borzna
Ponornytsia	settlement	Ponornytsia	Novhorod-Siverskyi	Korop
Pryluky	urban	Pryluky	Pryluky	city of Pryluky
Ripky	settlement	Ripky	Chernihiv	Ripky
Sedniv	settlement	Sedniv	Chernihiv	Chernihiv
Semenivka	urban	Semenivka	Novhorod-Siverskyi	Semenivka
Snovsk	urban	Snovsk	Koriukivka	Snovsk
Sosnytsia	settlement	Sosnytsia	Koriukivka	Sosnytsia
Sribne	settlement	Sribne	Pryluky	Sribne
Sukhopolova	rural	Sukhopolova	Pryluky	Pryluky
Talalaivka	settlement	Talalaivka	Pryluky	Talalaivka
Talalaivka	rural	Talalaivka	Nizhyn	Nizhyn
Tupychiv	rural	Tupychiv	Chernihiv	Horodnia
Varva	settlement	Varva	Pryluky	Varva
Vertiivka	rural	Vertiivka	Nizhyn	Nizhyn
Vysoke	rural	Vysoke	Nizhyn	Borzna
Yablunivka	rural	Yablunivka	Pryluky	Pryluky

== Chernivtsi Oblast ==
Hromada	Type	Center	Raion	Raion before 2020
Banyliv	rural	Banyliv	Vyzhnytsia	Vyzhnytsia
Berehomet	settlement	Berehomet	Vyzhnytsia	Vyzhnytsia
Boiany	rural	Boiany	Chernivtsi	Novoselytsia
Brusnytsia	rural	Brusnytsia	Vyzhnytsia	Kitsman
Chahor	rural	Chahor	Chernivtsi	Hlyboka
Chernivtsi	urban	Chernivtsi	Chernivtsi	city of Chernivtsi
Chudei	rural	Chudei	Chernivtsi	Storozhynets
Hertsa	urban	Hertsa	Chernivtsi	Hertsa
Hlyboka	settlement	Hlyboka	Chernivtsi	Hlyboka
Horishni Sherivtsi	rural	Horishni Sherivtsi	Chernivtsi	Zastavna
Kadubivtsi	rural	Kadubivtsi	Chernivtsi	Zastavna
Kamiana	rural	Kamiana	Chernivtsi	Storozhynets
Kamianka	rural	Kamianka	Chernivtsi	Hlyboka
Karapchiv	rural	Yordaneshty	Chernivtsi	Hlyboka
Kelmentsi	settlement	Kelmentsi	Dniester	Kelmentsi
Khotyn	urban	Khotyn	Dniester	Khotyn
Kitsman	urban	Kitsman	Chernivtsi	Kitsman
Klishkivtsi	rural	Klishkivtsi	Dniester	Khotyn
Koniatyn	rural	Koniatyn	Vyzhnytsia	Putyla
Kostryzhivka	settlement	Kostryzhivka	Chernivtsi	Zastavna
Krasnoilsk	settlement	Krasnoilsk	Chernivtsi	Storozhynets
Livyntsi	rural	Livyntsi	Dniester	Kelmentsi
Mahala	rural	Mahala	Chernivtsi	Novoselytsia
Mamaivtsi	rural	Mamaivtsi	Chernivtsi	Kitsman
Mamalyha	rural	Mamalyha	Dniester	Novoselytsia
Nedoboivtsi	rural	Nedoboivtsi	Dniester	Khotyn
Nepolokivtsi	settlement	Nepolokivtsi	Chernivtsi	Kitsman
Novodnistrovsk	urban	Novodnistrovsk	Dniester	city of Novodnistrovsk
Novoselytsia	urban	Novoselytsia	Chernivtsi	Novoselytsia
Ostrytsia	rural	Ostrytsia	Chernivtsi	Hertsa
Petrivtsi	rural	Verkhni Petrivtsi	Chernivtsi	Storozhynets
Putyla	settlement	Putyla	Vyzhnytsia	Putyla
Rukshyn	rural	Rukshyn	Dniester	Khotyn
Seliatyn	rural	Seliatyn	Vyzhnytsia	Putyla
Sokyriany	urban	Sokyriany	Dniester	Sokyriany
Stavchany	rural	Stavchany	Chernivtsi	Kitsman
Storozhynets	urban	Storozhynets	Chernivtsi	Storozhynets
Sucheveny	rural	Sucheveny	Chernivtsi	Hlyboka
Tarashany	rural	Tarashany	Chernivtsi	Hlyboka
Terebleche	rural	Terebleche	Chernivtsi	Hlyboka
Toporivtsi	rural	Toporivtsi	Chernivtsi	Novoselytsia
Ust-Putyla	rural	Ust-Putyla	Vyzhnytsia	Putyla
Vanchykivtsi	rural	Vanchykivtsi	Chernivtsi	Novoselytsia
Vashkivtsi	urban	Vashkivtsi	Vyzhnytsia	Vyzhnytsia
Vashkivtsi	rural	Vashkivtsi	Dniester	Sokyriany
Velykyi Kuchuriv	rural	Velykyi Kuchuriv	Chernivtsi	Storozhynets
Verenchanka	rural	Verenchanka	Chernivtsi	Zastavna
Vikno	rural	Vikno	Chernivtsi	Zastavna
Voloka	rural	Voloka	Chernivtsi	Hlyboka
Vyzhnytsia	urban	Vyzhnytsia	Vyzhnytsia	Vyzhnytsia
Yurkivtsi	rural	Yurkivtsi	Chernivtsi	Zastavna
Zastavna	urban	Zastavna	Chernivtsi	Zastavna

== Dnipropetrovsk Oblast ==
Hromada	Type	Center	Raion	Raion before 2020
Apostolove	urban	Apostolove	Kryvyi Rih	Apostolove
Bohdanivka	rural	Bohdanivka	Pavlohrad	Pavlohrad
Bohunivka	rural	Bohunivka	Synelnykove	Petropavlivka
Bozhedarivka	settlement	Bozhedarivka	Kamianske	Krynychky
Cherkaske	settlement	Cherkaske	Samar	Novomoskovsk
Chernechyna	rural	Chernechyna	Samar	Mahdalynivka
Chervonohryhorivka	settlement	Chervonohryhorivka	Nikopol	Nikopol
Chumaky	rural	Chumaky	Dnipro	Dnipro
Devladove	rural	Devladove	Kryvyi Rih	Sofiivka
Dnipro	urban	Dnipro	Dnipro	Dnipro Municipality
Dubovyky	rural	Dubovyky	Synelnykove	Vasylkivka
Hleiuvatka	rural	Hleiuvatka	Kryvyi Rih	Kryvyi Rih
Hrechani Pody	rural	Hrechani Pody	Kryvyi Rih	Shyroke
Hrushivka	rural	Hrushivka	Kryvyi Rih	Apostolove
Hubynykha	settlement	Hubynykha	Samar	Novomoskovsk
Ilarionove	settlement	Ilarionove	Synelnykove	Synelnykove
Kamianske	urban	Kamianske	Kamianske	Kamianske Municipality
Karpivka	rural	Karpivka	Kryvyi Rih	Shyroke
Krynychky	settlement	Krynychky	Kamianske	Krynychky
Kryvyi Rih	urban	Kryvyi Rih	Kryvyi Rih	Kryvyi Rih Municipality
Kytaihorod	rural	Kytaihorod	Dnipro	Tsarychanka
Liashkivka	rural	Liashkivka	Dnipro	Tsarychanka
Liubymivka	rural	Liubymivka	Dnipro	Dnipro
Lozuvatka	rural	Lozuvatka	Kryvyi Rih	Kryvyi Rih
Lychkove	rural	Lychkove	Samar	Mahdalynivka
Lykhivka	settlement	Lykhivka	Kamianske	Piatykhatky
Mahdalynivka	settlement	Mahdalynivka	Samar	Mahdalynivka
Malomykhailivka	rural	Malomykhailivka	Synelnykove	Pokrovske
Marhanets	urban	Marhanets	Nikopol	Marhanets Municipality
Mezhova	settlement	Mezhova	Synelnykove	Mezhova
Mezhyrich	rural	Mezhyrich	Pavlohrad	Pavlohrad
Mohyliv	rural	Mohyliv	Dnipro	Tsarychanka
Mykolaivka	rural	Mykolaivka	Dnipro	Dnipro
Mykolaivka	rural	Mykolaivka	Synelnykove	Petropavlivka
Myrove	rural	Myrove	Nikopol	Tomakivka
Nikopol	urban	Nikopol	Nikopol	city of Nikopol
Novolativka	rural	Novolativka	Kryvyi Rih	Shyroke
Samar	urban	Samar	Samar	city of Samar
Novooleksandrivka	rural	Novooleksandrivka	Dnipro	Dnipro
Novopavlivka	rural	Novopavlivka	Synelnykove	Mezhova
Novopillia	rural	Novopillia	Kryvyi Rih	Kryvyi Rih
Novopokrovka	settlement	Novopokrovka	Dnipro	Solone
Nyva Trudova	rural	Nyva Trudova	Kryvyi Rih	Apostolove
Obukhivka	settlement	Obukhivka	Dnipro	Dnipro
Pavlohrad	urban	Pavlohrad	Pavlohrad	city of Pavlohrad
Pereshchepyne	urban	Pereshchepyne	Samar	Novomoskovsk
Shakhtarske	urban	Shakhtarske	Synelnykove	city of Pershotravensk
Pershotravneve	rural	Mozolevske	Nikopol	Nikopol
Petropavlivka	settlement	Petropavlivka	Synelnykove	Petropavlivka
Petrykivka	settlement	Petrykivka	Dnipro	Petrykivka
Piatykhatky	urban	Piatykhatky	Kamianske	Piatykhatky
Pidhorodne	urban	Pidhorodne	Dnipro	Dnipro
Pishchanka	rural	Pishchanka	Samar	Novomoskovsk
Pokrov	urban	Pokrov	Nikopol	Pokrov Municipality
Pokrovske	settlement	Pokrovske	Synelnykove	Pokrovske
Pokrovske	rural	Pokrovske	Nikopol	Nikopol
Raivka	rural	Raivka	Synelnykove	Synelnykove
Rozdory	settlement	Rozdory	Synelnykove	Synelnykove
Saksahan	rural	Saksahan	Kamianske	Piatykhatky
Shyroke	settlement	Shyroke	Kryvyi Rih	Shyroke
Slavhorod	settlement	Slavhorod	Synelnykove	Synelnykove
Slobozhanske	settlement	Slobozhanske	Dnipro	Dnipro
Slovianka	rural	Slovianka	Synelnykove	Mezhova
Sofiivka	settlement	Sofiivka	Kryvyi Rih	Sofiivka
Solone	settlement	Solone	Dnipro	Solone
Sursko-Lytovske	rural	Sursko-Lytovske	Dnipro	Dnipro
Sviatovasylivka	rural	Sviatovasylivka	Dnipro	Solone
Synelnykove	urban	Synelnykove	Synelnykove	city of Synelnykove
Ternivka	urban	Ternivka	Pavlohrad	Ternivka Municipality
Tomakivka	settlement	Tomakivka	Nikopol	Tomakivka
Troitske	rural	Troitske	Pavlohrad	Pavlohrad
Tsarychanka	settlement	Tsarychanka	Dnipro	Tsarychanka
Ukrainske	rural	Ukrainske	Synelnykove	Petropavlivka
Vakulove	rural	Vakulove	Kryvyi Rih	Sofiivka
Vasylkivka	settlement	Vasylkivka	Synelnykove	Vasylkivka
Velykomykhailivka	rural	Velykomykhailivka	Synelnykove	Pokrovske
Verbky	rural	Verbky	Pavlohrad	Pavlohrad
Verkhivtseve	urban	Verkhivtseve	Kamianske	Verkhniodniprovsk
Verkhniodniprovsk	urban	Verkhniodniprovsk	Kamianske	Verkhniodniprovsk
Vilnohirsk	urban	Vilnohirsk	Kamianske	city of Vilnohirsk
Vyshneve	settlement	Vyshneve	Kamianske	Piatykhatky
Yurivka	settlement	Yurivka	Pavlohrad	Yurivka
Zaitseve	rural	Zaitseve	Synelnykove	Synelnykove
Zatyshne	rural	Zatyshne	Kamianske	Krynychky
Zelenodolsk	urban	Zelenodolsk	Kryvyi Rih	Apostolove
Zhovti Vody	urban	Zhovti Vody	Kamianske	Zhovti Vody Municipality

== Donetsk Oblast ==
Hromada	Type	Center	Raion	Raion before 2020
Donetsk	urban	Donetsk	Donetsk	
Avdiivka	urban	Avdiivka	Pokrovsk	
Bakhmut	urban	Bakhmut	Bakhmut	
Horlivka	urban	Horlivka	Horlivka	
Debaltseve	urban	Debaltseve	Horlivka	
Toretsk	urban	Toretsk	Bakhmut	
Myrnohrad	urban	Myrnohrad	Pokrovsk	
Bilozerske	urban	Bilozerske	Pokrovsk	
Dobropillia	urban	Dobropillia	Pokrovsk	
Novodonetske	settlement	Novodonetske	Kramatorsk	
Dokuchaievsk	urban	Dokuchaievsk	Kalmiuske	
Druzhkivka	urban	Druzhkivka	Kramatorsk	
Yenakiieve	urban	Yenakiieve	Horlivka	
Zhdanivka	urban	Zhdanivka	Horlivka	
Mariupol	urban	Mariupol	Mariupol	
Sartana	settlement	Sartana	Mariupol	
Khrestivka	urban	Khrestivka	Horlivka	
Kostiantynivka	urban	Kostiantynivka	Kramatorsk	
Kramatorsk	urban	Kramatorsk	Kramatorsk	
Pokrovsk	urban	Pokrovsk	Pokrovsk	
Lyman	urban	Lyman	Kramatorsk	
Makiivka	urban	Makiivka	Donetsk	
Novohrodivka	urban	Novohrodivka	Pokrovsk	
Selydove	urban	Selydove	Pokrovsk	
Sviatohirsk	urban	Sviatohirsk	Kramatorsk	
Sloviansk	urban	Sloviansk	Kramatorsk	
Snizhne	urban	Snizhne	Horlivka	
Chystiakove	urban	Chystiakove	Horlivka	
Vuhledar	urban	Vuhledar	Volnovakha	
Ilovaisk	urban	Ilovaisk	Donetsk	
Khartsyzk	urban	Khartsyzk	Donetsk	
Shakhtarsk	urban	Shakhtarsk	Horlivka	
Yasynuvata	urban	Yasynuvata	Donetsk	
Oleksandrivka	settlement	Oleksandrivka	Kramatorsk	
Amvrosiivka	urban	Amvrosiivka	Donetsk	
Vuhlehirsk	urban	Vuhlehirsk	Horlivka	
Svitlodarsk	urban	Svitlodarsk	Bakhmut	
Siversk	urban	Siversk	Bakhmut	
Soledar	urban	Soledar	Bakhmut	
Chasiv Yar	urban	Chasiv Yar	Bakhmut	
Zvanivka	rural	Zvanivka	Bakhmut	
Velyka Novosilka	settlement	Velyka Novosilka	Volnovakha	
Komar	rural	Komar	Volnovakha	
Staromlynivka	rural	Staromlynivka	Volnovakha	
Volnovakha	urban	Volnovakha	Volnovakha	
Myrne	settlement	Myrne	Volnovakha	
Olhynka	settlement	Olhynka	Volnovakha	
Khlibodarivka	rural	Khlibodarivka	Volnovakha	
Nikolske	settlement	Nikolske	Mariupol	
Kalchyk	rural	Kalchyk	Mariupol	
Kryvorizhzhia	rural	Kryvorizhzhia	Pokrovsk	
Shakhove	rural	Shakhove	Pokrovsk	
Illinivka	rural	Illinivka	Kramatorsk	
Hrodivka	settlement	Hrodivka	Pokrovsk	
Udachne	settlement	Udachne	Pokrovsk	
Kurakhove	urban	Kurakhove	Pokrovsk	
Marinka	urban	Marinka	Pokrovsk	
Novoazovsk	urban	Novoazovsk	Kalmiuske	
Manhush	settlement	Manhush	Mariupol	
Mykolaivka	urban	Mykolaivka	Kramatorsk	
Cherkaske	settlement	Cherkaske	Kramatorsk	
Andriivka	rural	Andriivka	Kramatorsk	
Kalmiuske	urban	Kalmiuske	Kalmiuske	
Starobesheve	settlement	Starobesheve	Kalmiuske	
Boikivske	settlement	Boikivske	Kalmiuske	
Ocheretyne	settlement	Ocheretyne	Pokrovsk	

Hromadas that were occupied before the 2022 Russian Invasion of Ukraine
Hromadas that were occupied during the 2022 Russian Invasion of Ukraine

== Ivano-Frankivsk Oblast ==
Hromada	Type	Center	Raion	Raion before 2020
Biloberizka	rural	Biloberizka	Verkhovyna	Verkhovyna
Bilshivtsi	settlement	Bilshivtsi	Ivano-Frankivsk	Halych
Bohorodchany	settlement	Bohorodchany	Ivano-Frankivsk	Bohorodchany
Bolekhiv	urban	Bolekhiv	Kalush	Bolekhiv Municipality
Broshniv-Osada	settlement	Broshniv-Osada	Kalush	Rozhniativ
Bukachivtsi	settlement	Bukachivtsi	Ivano-Frankivsk	Rohatyn
Burshtyn	urban	Burshtyn	Ivano-Frankivsk	Burshtyn Municipality
Chernelytsia	settlement	Chernelytsia	Kolomyia	Horodenka
Deliatyn	settlement	Deliatyn	Nadvirna	Nadvirna
Dolyna	urban	Dolyna	Kalush	Dolyna
Duba	rural	Duba	Kalush	Rozhniativ
Dubivtsi	rural	Dubivtsi	Ivano-Frankivsk	Halych
Dzvyniach	rural	Dzvyniach	Ivano-Frankivsk	Bohorodchany
Halych	urban	Halych	Ivano-Frankivsk	Halych
Horodenka	urban	Horodenka	Kolomyia	Horodenka
Hvizdets	settlement	Hvizdets	Kolomyia	Kolomyia
Ivano-Frankivsk	urban	Ivano-Frankivsk	Ivano-Frankivsk	Ivano-Frankivsk Municipality
Kalush	urban	Kalush	Kalush	city of Kalush
Kolomyia	urban	Kolomyia	Kolomyia	city of Kolomyia
Korshiv	rural	Korshiv	Kolomyia	Kolomyia
Kosiv	urban	Kosiv	Kosiv	Kosiv
Kosmach	rural	Kosmach	Kosiv	Kosiv
Kuty	settlement	Kuty	Kosiv	Kosiv
Lanchyn	settlement	Lanchyn	Nadvirna	Nadvirna
Lysets	settlement	Lysets	Ivano-Frankivsk	Tysmenytsia
Mateyivtsi	rural	Mateyivtsi	Kolomyia	Kolomyia
Nadvirna	urban	Nadvirna	Nadvirna	Nadvirna
Novytsia	rural	Novytsia	Kalush	Kalush
Nyzhnii Verbizh	rural	Nyzhnii Verbizh	Kolomyia	Kolomyia
Obertyn	settlement	Obertyn	Ivano-Frankivsk	Tlumach
Olesha	rural	Olesha	Ivano-Frankivsk	Tlumach
Otyniia	settlement	Otyniia	Kolomyia	Kolomyia
Pasichna	rural	Pasichna	Nadvirna	Nadvirna
Pechenizhyn	settlement	Pechenizhyn	Kolomyia	Kolomyia
Perehinske	settlement	Perehinske	Kalush	Rozhniativ
Pererisl	rural	Pererisl	Nadvirna	Nadvirna
Piadyky	rural	Piadyky	Kolomyia	Kolomyia
Pidhaichyky	rural	Pidhaichyky	Kolomyia	Kolomyia
Polianytsia	rural	Polianytsia	Nadvirna	Yaremche Municipality
Rohatyn	urban	Rohatyn	Ivano-Frankivsk	Rohatyn
Rozhniativ	settlement	Rozhniativ	Kalush	Rozhniativ
Rozhniv	rural	Rozhniv	Kosiv	Kosiv
Sniatyn	urban	Sniatyn	Kolomyia	Sniatyn
Solotvyn	settlement	Solotvyn	Ivano-Frankivsk	Bohorodchany
Spas	rural	Spas	Kalush	Rozhniativ
Stari Bohorodchany	rural	Stari Bohorodchany	Ivano-Frankivsk	Bohorodchany
Tlumach	urban	Tlumach	Ivano-Frankivsk	Tlumach
Tysmenytsia	urban	Tysmenytsia	Ivano-Frankivsk	Tysmenytsia
Uhryniv	rural	Uhryniv	Ivano-Frankivsk	Tysmenytsia
Verkhnia	rural	Verkhnia	Kalush	Kalush
Verkhovyna	settlement	Verkhovyna	Verkhovyna	Verkhovyna
Voinyliv	settlement	Voinyliv	Kalush	Kalush
Vorokhta	settlement	Vorokhta	Nadvirna	Yaremche Municipality
Vyhoda	settlement	Vyhoda	Kalush	Dolyna
Vytvytsia	rural	Vytvytsia	Kalush	Dolyna
Yabluniv	settlement	Yabluniv	Kosiv	Kosiv
Yamnytsia	rural	Yamnytsia	Ivano-Frankivsk	Tysmenytsia
Yaremche	urban	Yaremche	Nadvirna	Yaremche Municipality
Yezupil	settlement	Yezupil	Ivano-Frankivsk	Tysmenytsia
Zabolotiv	settlement	Zabolotiv	Kolomyia	Sniatyn
Zahvizdia	rural	Zahvizdia	Ivano-Frankivsk	Tysmenytsia
Zelene	rural	Zelene	Verkhovyna	Verkhovyna

== Kharkiv Oblast ==
Hromada	Type	Center	Raion	Raion before 2020
Balakliia	urban	Balakliia	Izium	Balakliia
Barvinkove	urban	Barvinkove	Izium	Barvinkove
Bezliudivka	settlement	Bezliudivka	Kharkiv	Kharkiv
Biliaivka	rural	Biliaivka	Lozova	Pervomaiskyi
Blyzniuky	settlement	Blyzniuky	Lozova	Blyzniuky
Bohodukhiv	urban	Bohodukhiv	Bohodukhiv	Bohodukhiv
Borova	settlement	Borova	Izium	Borova
Chkalovske	settlement	Chkalovske	Chuhuiv	Chuhuiv
Chuhuiv	urban	Chuhuiv	Chuhuiv	Chuhuiv Municipality
Derhachi	urban	Derhachi	Kharkiv	Derhachi
Donets	settlement	Donets	Izium	Balakliia
Dvorichna	settlement	Dvorichna	Kupiansk	Dvorichna
Izium	urban	Izium	Izium	city of Izium
Kehychivka	settlement	Kehychivka	Krasnohrad	Kehychivka
Kharkiv	urban	Kharkiv	Kharkiv	city of Kharkiv
Kindrashivka	rural	Kindrashivka	Kupiansk	Kupiansk
Kolomak	settlement	Kolomak	Bohodukhiv	Kolomak
Krasnohrad	urban	Krasnohrad	Krasnohrad	Krasnohrad
Krasnokutsk	settlement	Krasnokutsk	Bohodukhiv	Krasnokutsk
Kunie	rural	Kunie	Izium	Izium
Kupiansk	urban	Kupiansk	Kupiansk	Kupiansk Municipality
Kurylivka	rural	Kurylivka	Kupiansk	Kupiansk
Liubotyn	urban	Liubotyn	Kharkiv	Liubotyn Municipality
Lozova	urban	Lozova	Lozova	Lozova; Lozova Municipality
Lyptsi	rural	Lyptsi	Kharkiv	Kharkiv
Mala Danylivka	settlement	Mala Danylivka	Kharkiv	Derhachi
Malynivka	settlement	Malynivka	Chuhuiv	Chuhuiv
Merefa	urban	Merefa	Kharkiv	Kharkiv
Natalyne	rural	Natalyne	Krasnohrad	Krasnohrad
Nova Vodolaha	settlement	Nova Vodolaha	Kharkiv	Nova Vodolaha
Novopokrovka	settlement	Novopokrovka	Chuhuiv	Chuhuiv
Oleksiivka	rural	Oleksiivka	Lozova	Pervomaiskyi
Oskil	rural	Oskil	Izium	Izium
Pechenihy	settlement	Pechenihy	Chuhuiv	Pechenihy
Pervomaiskyi	urban	Zlatopil	Lozova	city of Pervomaiskyi
Petropavlivka	rural	Petropavlivka	Kupiansk	Kupiansk
Pisochyn	settlement	Pisochyn	Kharkiv	Kharkiv
Pivdenne	urban	Pivdenne	Kharkiv	Kharkiv
Rohan	settlement	Rohan	Kharkiv	Kharkiv
Sakhnovshchyna	settlement	Sakhnovshchyna	Krasnohrad	Sakhnovshchyna
Savyntsi	settlement	Savyntsi	Izium	Balakliia
Shevchenkove	settlement	Shevchenkove	Kupiansk	Shevchenkove
Slobozhanske	settlement	Slobozhanske	Chuhuiv	Zmiiv
Solonytsivka	settlement	Solonytsivka	Kharkiv	Derhachi
Starovirivka	rural	Starovirivka	Krasnohrad	Nova Vodolaha
Staryi Saltiv	settlement	Staryi Saltiv	Chuhuiv	Vovchansk
Tsyrkuny	rural	Tsyrkuny	Kharkiv	Kharkiv
Valky	urban	Valky	Bohodukhiv	Valky
Velykyi Burluk	settlement	Velykyi Burluk	Kupiansk	Velykyi Burluk
Vilkhivka	rural	Vilkhivka	Kharkiv	Kharkiv
Vilkhuvatka	rural	Vilkhuvatka	Kupiansk	Velykyi Burluk
Vovchansk	urban	Vovchansk	Chuhuiv	Vovchansk
Vysokyi	settlement	Vysokyi	Kharkiv	Kharkiv
Zachepylivka	settlement	Zachepylivka	Krasnohrad	Zachepylivka
Zmiiv	urban	Zmiiv	Chuhuiv	Zmiiv
Zolochiv	settlement	Zolochiv	Bohodukhiv	Zolochiv

== Kherson Oblast ==
Hromada	Type	Center	Raion	Raion before 2020
Askania-Nova	settlement	Askania-Nova	Kakhovka	Chaplynka
Bekhtery	rural	Bekhtery	Skadovsk	Hola Prystan
Beryslav	urban	Beryslav	Beryslav	Beryslav
Bilozerka	settlement	Bilozerka	Kherson	Bilozerka
Borozenske	rural	Borozenske	Beryslav	Velyka Oleksandrivka
Chaplynka	settlement	Chaplynka	Kakhovka	Chaplynka
Chornobaivka	rural	Chornobaivka	Kherson	Bilozerka
Chulakivka	rural	Chulakivka	Skadovsk	Hola Prystan
Darivka	rural	Darivka, Kherson Raion	Kherson	Bilozerka
Dolmativka	rural	Dolmativka	Skadovsk	Hola Prystan
Henichesk	urban	Henichesk	Henichesk	Henichesk
Hola Prystan	urban	Hola Prystan	Skadovsk	Hola Prystan Municipality
Hornostaivka	settlement	Hornostaivka	Kakhovka	Hornostaivka
Hryhorivka	rural	Hryhorivka	Kakhovka	Chaplynka
Ivanivka	settlement	Ivanivka	Henichesk	Ivanivka
Kakhovka	urban	Kakhovka	Kakhovka	city of Kakhovka
Kalanchak	settlement	Kalanchak	Skadovsk	Kalanchak
Kalynivske	settlement	Kalynivske	Beryslav	Velyka Oleksandrivka
Kherson	urban	Kherson	Kherson	Kherson Municipality
Khrestivka	rural	Khrestivka	Kakhovka	Chaplynka
Kochubeivka	rural	Kochubeivka	Beryslav	Vysokopillia
Kostiantynivka	rural	Kostiantynivka	Kakhovka	Hornostaivka
Lazurne	settlement	Lazurne	Skadovsk	Skadovsk
Liubymivka	settlement	Liubymivka	Kakhovka	Kakhovka
Muzykivka	rural	Muzykivka	Kherson	Bilozerka
Mylove	rural	Mylove	Beryslav	Beryslav
Myrne	settlement	Myrne	Skadovsk	Kalanchak
Nyzhni Sirohozy	settlement	Nyzhni Sirohozy	Henichesk	Nyzhni Sirohozy
Nova Kakhovka	urban	Nova Kakhovka	Kakhovka	Nova Kakhovka Municipality
Novomykolaivka	rural	Novomykolaivka	Skadovsk	Skadovsk
Novooleksandrivka	rural	Novooleksandrivka	Beryslav	Novovorontsovka
Novoraisk	rural	Novoraisk	Beryslav	Beryslav
Novotroitske	settlement	Novotroitske	Henichesk	Novotroitske
Novovorontsovka	settlement	Novovorontsovka	Beryslav	Novovorontsovka
Oleshky	urban	Oleshky	Kherson	Oleshky
Rubanivka	rural	Rubanivka	Kakhovka	Velyka Lepetykha
Skadovsk	urban	Skadovsk	Skadovsk	Skadovsk
Stanislav	rural	Stanislav	Kherson	Bilozerka
Tavriisk	urban	Tavriisk	Kakhovka	Kakhovka Nova Kakhovka Municipality
Tavrychanka	rural	Tavrychanka	Kakhovka	Kakhovka
Tiahynka	rural	Tiahynka	Beryslav	Beryslav
Velyka Lepetykha	settlement	Velyka Lepetykha	Kakhovka	Velyka Lepetykha
Velyka Oleksandrivka	settlement	Velyka Oleksandrivka	Beryslav	Velyka Oleksandrivka
Velyki Kopani	rural	Velyki Kopani	Kherson	Oleshky
Verkhnii Rohachyk	settlement	Verkhnii Rohachyk	Kakhovka	Verkhnii Rohachyk
Vynohradove	rural	Vynohradove	Kherson	Oleshky
Vysokopillia	settlement	Vysokopillia	Beryslav	Vysokopillia
Yuvileine	rural	Yuvileine	Kherson	Oleshky
Zelenyi Pid	rural	Zelenyi Pid	Kakhovka	Kakhovka

== Khmelnytskyi Oblast ==
Hromada	Type	Center	Raion	Raion before 2020
Antoniny	settlement	Antoniny	Khmelnytskyi	Krasyliv
Berezdiv	rural	Berezdiv	Shepetivka	Slavuta
Bilohiria	settlement	Bilohiria	Shepetivka	Bilohiria
Chemerivtsi	settlement	Chemerivtsi	Kamianets-Podilskyi	Chemerivtsi
Chornyi Ostriv	settlement	Chornyi Ostriv	Khmelnytskyi	Khmelnytskyi
Derazhnia	urban	Derazhnia	Khmelnytskyi	Derazhnia
Dunaivtsi	urban	Dunaivtsi	Kamianets-Podilskyi	Dunaivtsi
Hannopil	rural	Hannopil	Shepetivka	Slavuta
Horodok	urban	Horodok	Khmelnytskyi	Horodok
Hrytsiv	settlement	Hrytsiv	Shepetivka	Shepetivka
Hukiv	rural	Hukiv	Kamianets-Podilskyi	Chemerivtsi
Humentsi	rural	Humentsi	Kamianets-Podilskyi	Kamianets-Podilskyi
Hvardiiske	rural	Hvardiiske	Khmelnytskyi	Khmelnytskyi
Iziaslav	urban	Iziaslav	Shepetivka	Iziaslav
Kamianets-Podilskyi	urban	Kamianets-Podilskyi	Kamianets-Podilskyi	city of Kamianets-Podilskyi
Khmelnytskyi	urban	Khmelnytskyi	Khmelnytskyi	city of Khmelnytskyi
Krasyliv	urban	Krasyliv	Khmelnytskyi	Krasyliv
Krupets	rural	Krupets	Shepetivka	Slavuta
Kytaihorod	rural	Kytaihorod	Kamianets-Podilskyi	Kamianets-Podilskyi
Lenkivtsi	rural	Lenkivtsi	Shepetivka	Shepetivka
Letychiv	settlement	Letychiv	Khmelnytskyi	Letychiv
Lisovi Hrynivtsi	rural	Lisovi Hrynivtsi	Khmelnytskyi	Khmelnytskyi
Makiv	rural	Makiv	Kamianets-Podilskyi	Dunaivtsi
Medzhybizh	settlement	Medzhybizh	Khmelnytskyi	Letychiv
Mykhailiuchka	rural	Mykhailiuchka	Shepetivka	Shepetivka
Myroliubne	rural	Myroliubne	Khmelnytskyi	Starokostiantyniv
Narkevychi	settlement	Narkevychi	Khmelnytskyi	Volochysk
Netishyn	urban	Netishyn	Shepetivka	city of Netishyn
Nova Ushytsia	settlement	Nova Ushytsia	Kamianets-Podilskyi	Nova Ushytsia
Novodunaivtsi	settlement	Dunaivtsi	Kamianets-Podilskyi	Dunaivtsi
Orynyn	rural	Orynyn	Kamianets-Podilskyi	Kamianets-Podilskyi
Pluzhne	rural	Pluzhne	Shepetivka	Iziaslav
Polonne	urban	Polonne	Shepetivka	Polonne
Poninka	settlement	Poninka	Shepetivka	Polonne
Rozsosha	rural	Rozsosha	Khmelnytskyi	Khmelnytskyi
Sakhnivtsi	rural	Sakhnivtsi	Shepetivka	Iziaslav
Sataniv	settlement	Sataniv	Khmelnytskyi	Horodok
Shchyborivka	rural	Shchyborivka	Khmelnytskyi	Krasyliv
Shepetivka	urban	Shepetivka	Shepetivka	city of Shepetivka
Slavuta	urban	Slavuta	Shepetivka	city of Slavuta
Slobidka-Kulchiievetska	rural	Slobidka-Kulchiievetska	Kamianets-Podilskyi	Kamianets-Podilskyi
Smotrych	settlement	Smotrych	Kamianets-Podilskyi	Dunaivtsi
Solobkivtsi	rural	Solobkivtsi	Khmelnytskyi	Yarmolyntsi
Stara Syniava	settlement	Stara Syniava	Khmelnytskyi	Stara Syniava
Stara Ushytsia	settlement	Stara Ushytsia	Kamianets-Podilskyi	Kamianets-Podilskyi
Starokostiantyniv	urban	Starokostiantyniv	Khmelnytskyi	Starokostiantyniv city of Starokostiantyniv
Staryi Ostropil	rural	Staryi Ostropil	Khmelnytskyi	Starokostiantyniv
Sudylkiv	rural	Sudylkiv	Shepetivka	Shepetivka
Teofipol	settlement	Teofipol	Khmelnytskyi	Teofipol
Ulashanivka	rural	Ulashanivka	Shepetivka	Slavuta
Viitivtsi	settlement	Viitivtsi	Khmelnytskyi	Volochysk
Vinkivtsi	settlement	Vinkivtsi	Khmelnytskyi	Vinkivtsi
Volochysk	urban	Volochysk	Khmelnytskyi	Volochysk
Vovkovyntsi	settlement	Vovkovyntsi	Khmelnytskyi	Derazhnia
Yampil	settlement	Yampil	Shepetivka	Bilohiria
Yarmolyntsi	settlement	Yarmolyntsi	Khmelnytskyi	Yarmolyntsi
Zakupne	settlement	Zakupne	Kamianets-Podilskyi	Chemerivtsi
Zasluchne	rural	Zasluchne	Khmelnytskyi	Krasyliv
Zhvanets	rural	Zhvanets	Kamianets-Podilskyi	Kamianets-Podilskyi
Zinkiv	rural	Zinkiv	Khmelnytskyi	Vinkivtsi

== Kirovohrad Oblast ==
Hromada	Type	Center	Raion	Raion before 2020
Adzhamka	rural	Adzhamka	Kropyvnytskyi	Kropyvnytskyi
Blahovishchenske	urban	Blahovishchenske	Holovanivsk	Blahovishchenske
Bobrynets	urban	Bobrynets	Kropyvnytskyi	Bobrynets
Dmytrivka	rural	Dmytrivka	Kropyvnytskyi	Znamianka
Dobrovelychkivka	settlement	Dobrovelychkivka	Novoukrainka	Dobrovelychkivka
Dolynska	urban	Dolynska	Kropyvnytskyi	Dolynska
Haivoron	urban	Haivoron	Holovanivsk	Haivoron
Hannivka	rural	Hannivka	Novoukrainka	Novoukrainka
Hlodosy	rural	Hlodosy	Novoukrainka	Novoukrainka
Holovanivsk	settlement	Holovanivsk	Holovanivsk	Holovanivsk
Hurivka	rural	Hurivka	Kropyvnytskyi	Dolynska
Katerynivka	rural	Katerynivka	Kropyvnytskyi	Kropyvnytskyi
Ketrysanivka	rural	Ketrysanivka	Kropyvnytskyi	Bobrynets
Kompaniivka	settlement	Kompaniivka	Kropyvnytskyi	Kompaniivka
Kropyvnytskyi	urban	Kropyvnytskyi	Kropyvnytskyi	Kropyvnytskyi Municipality
Mala Vyska	urban	Mala Vyska	Novoukrainka	Mala Vyska
Marianivska	rural	Velyka Vyska	Novoukrainka	Mala Vyska
Nadlak	rural	Nadlak	Holovanivsk	Novoarkhanhelsk
Nova Praha	settlement	Nova Praha	Oleksandriia	Oleksandriia
Novhorodka	settlement	Novhorodka	Kropyvnytskyi	Novhorodka
Novoarkhanhelsk	settlement	Novoarkhanhelsk	Holovanivsk	Novoarkhanhelsk
Novomyrhorod	urban	Novomyrhorod	Novoukrainka	Novomyrhorod
Novoukrainka	urban	Novoukrainka	Novoukrainka	Novoukrainka
Oleksandriia	urban	Oleksandriia	Oleksandriia	Oleksandriia Municipality
Oleksandrivka	settlement	Oleksandrivka	Kropyvnytskyi	Oleksandrivka
Onufriivka	settlement	Onufriivka	Oleksandriia	Onufriivka
Pantaivka	settlement	Pantaivka	Oleksandriia	Oleksandriia Municipality
Perehonivka	rural	Perehonivka	Holovanivsk	Holovanivsk
Pervozvanivka	rural	Pervozvanivka	Kropyvnytskyi	Kropyvnytskyi
Petrove	settlement	Petrove	Oleksandriia	Petrove
Pidvysoke	rural	Pidvysoke	Holovanivsk	Novoarkhanhelsk
Pishchanyi Brid	rural	Pishchanyi Brid	Novoukrainka	Dobrovelychkivka
Pobuzke	settlement	Pobuzke	Holovanivsk	Holovanivsk
Pomichna	urban	Pomichna	Novoukrainka	Dobrovelychkivka
Popelnaste	rural	Popelnaste	Oleksandriia	Oleksandriia
Pryiutivka	settlement	Pryiutivka	Oleksandriia	Oleksandriia
Rivne	rural	Rivne	Novoukrainka	Novoukrainka
Smoline	settlement	Smoline	Novoukrainka	Mala Vyska
Sokolivske	rural	Sokolivske	Kropyvnytskyi	Kropyvnytskyi
Subottsi	rural	Subottsi	Kropyvnytskyi	Znamianka
Svitlovodsk	urban	Svitlovodsk	Oleksandriia	Svitlovodsk Municipality
Tyshkivka	rural	Tyshkivka	Novoukrainka	Dobrovelychkivka
Ustynivka	settlement	Ustynivka	Kropyvnytskyi	Ustynivka
Velyka Andrusivka	rural	Velyka Andrusivka	Oleksandriia	Svitlovodsk
Velyka Severynka	rural	Velyka Severynka	Kropyvnytskyi	Kropyvnytskyi
Vilshanka	settlement	Vilshanka	Holovanivsk	Vilshanka
Zavallia	settlement	Zavallia	Holovanivsk	Haivoron
Zlynka	rural	Zlynka	Novoukrainka	Mala Vyska
Znamianka	urban	Znamianka	Kropyvnytskyi	Znamianka Municipality

== Kyiv City ==
Hromada	Type	Center	Raion	Raion before 2020
Kyiv	urban	Kyiv	–	–

== Kyiv Oblast ==
Hromada	Type	Center	Raion	Raion before 2020
Baryshivka	settlement	Baryshivka	Brovary	Baryshivka
Berezan	urban	Berezan	Brovary	city of Berezan
Bila Tserkva	urban	Bila Tserkva	Bila Tserkva	city of Bila Tserkva
Bilohorodka	rural	Bilohorodka	Bucha	Kyiv-Sviatoshyn
Bohuslav	urban	Bohuslav	Obukhiv	Bohuslav
Boiarka	urban	Boiarka	Fastiv	Kyiv-Sviatoshyn
Borodianka	settlement	Borodianka	Bucha	Borodianka
Borshchahivka	rural	Sofiivska Borshchahivka	Bucha	Kyiv-Sviatoshyn
Boryspil	urban	Boryspil	Boryspil	city of Boryspil
Brovary	urban	Brovary	Brovary	city of Brovary
Bucha	urban	Bucha	Bucha	city of Bucha
Byshiv	rural	Byshiv	Fastiv	Makariv
Chabany	settlement	Chabany	Fastiv	Kyiv-Sviatoshyn
Divychky	rural	Divychky	Boryspil	Pereiaslav-Khmelnytskyi
Dmytrivka	rural	Dmytrivka	Bucha	Kyiv-Sviatoshyn
Dymer	settlement	Dymer	Vyshhorod	Vyshhorod
Fastiv	urban	Fastiv	Fastiv	city of Fastiv
Feodosiivka	rural	Khodosivka	Obukhiv	Kyiv-Sviatoshyn
Fursy	rural	Fursy	Bila Tserkva	Bila Tserkva
Hatne	rural	Hatne	Fastiv	Kyiv-Sviatoshyn
Hlevakha	settlement	Hlevakha	Fastiv	Vasylkiv
Hora	rural	Hora	Boryspil	Boryspil
Hostomel	settlement	Hostomel	Bucha	Irpin Municipality
Hrebinky	settlement	Hrebinky	Bila Tserkva	Vasylkiv
Irpin	urban	Irpin	Bucha	Irpin Municipality
Ivankiv	settlement	Ivankiv	Vyshhorod	Ivankiv
Kaharlyk	urban	Kaharlyk	Obukhiv	Kaharlyk
Kalynivka	settlement	Kalynivka	Brovary	Brovary
Kalynivka	settlement	Kalynivka	Fastiv	Vasylkiv
Kalyta	settlement	Kalyta	Brovary	Brovary
Kotsiubynske	settlement	Kotsiubynske	Bucha	Irpin Municipality
Kovalivka	rural	Kovalivka	Bila Tserkva	Vasylkiv
Kozhanka	settlement	Kozhanka	Fastiv	Fastiv
Kozyn	settlement	Kozyn	Obukhiv	Obukhiv
Makariv	settlement	Makariv	Bucha	Makariv
Mala Vilshanka	rural	Mala Vilshanka	Bila Tserkva	Bila Tserkva
Medvyn	rural	Medvyn	Bila Tserkva	Bohuslav
Myronivka	urban	Myronivka	Obukhiv	Myronivka
Nemishaieve	settlement	Nemishaieve	Bucha	Borodianka
Obukhiv	urban	Obukhiv	Obukhiv	Obukhiv Municipality
Pereiaslav	urban	Pereiaslav	Boryspil	city of Pereiaslav
Petrivtsi	rural	Novi Petrivtsi	Vyshhorod	Vyshhorod
Pirnove	rural	Pirnove	Vyshhorod	Vyshhorod
Piskivka	settlement	Piskivka	Bucha	Borodianka
Poliske	settlement	Krasiatychi	Vyshhorod	Poliske
Prystolychchia	rural	Shchaslyve	Boryspil	Boryspil
Rokytne	settlement	Rokytne	Bila Tserkva	Rokytne
Rzhyshchiv	urban	Rzhyshchiv	Obukhiv	city of Rzhyshchiv
Skvyra	urban	Skvyra	Bila Tserkva	Skvyra
Slavutych	urban	Slavutych	Vyshhorod	city of Slavutych
Stavyshche	settlement	Stavyshche	Bila Tserkva	Stavyshche
Studenyky	rural	Studenyky	Boryspil	Pereiaslav-Khmelnytskyi
Tarashcha	urban	Tarashcha	Bila Tserkva	Tarashcha
Tashan	rural	Tashan	Boryspil	Pereiaslav-Khmelnytskyi
Tetiiv	urban	Tetiiv	Bila Tserkva	Tetiiv
Tomashivka	rural	Tomashivka	Fastiv	Fastiv
Tsybli	rural	Tsybli	Boryspil	Pereiaslav-Khmelnytskyi
Ukrainka	urban	Ukrainka	Obukhiv	Obukhiv
Uzyn	urban	Uzyn	Bila Tserkva	Bila Tserkva
Vasylkiv	urban	Vasylkiv	Obukhiv	Vasylkiv and city of Vasylkiv
Velyka Dymerka	settlement	Velyka Dymerka	Brovary	Brovary
Volodarka	settlement	Volodarka	Bila Tserkva	Volodarka
Voronkiv	rural	Voronkiv	Boryspil	Boryspil
Vyshhorod	urban	Vyshhorod	Vyshhorod	Vyshhorod
Vyshneve	urban	Vyshneve	Bucha	Kyiv-Sviatoshyn
Yahotyn	urban	Yahotyn	Boryspil	Yahotyn
Zazymia	rural	Zazymia	Brovary	Brovary
Zghurivka	settlement	Zghurivka	Brovary	Zghurivka
Zolochiv	rural	Hnidyn	Boryspil	Boryspil

== Luhansk Oblast ==
Hromada	Type	Center	Raion	Raion before 2020
Luhansk	urban	Luhansk	Luhansk	
Antratsyt	urban	Antratsyt	Rovenky	
Alchevsk	urban	Alchevsk	Alchevsk	
Molodohvardiisk	urban	Molodohvardiisk	Luhansk	
Sorokyne	urban	Sorokyne	Dovzhansk	
Khrustalnyi	urban	Khrustalnyi	Rovenky	
Lysychansk	urban	Lysychansk	Sievierodonetsk	
Rovenky	urban	Rovenky	Rovenky	
Rubizhne	urban	Rubizhne	Sievierodonetsk	
Dovzhansk	urban	Dovzhansk	Dovzhansk	
Sievierodonetsk	urban	Sievierodonetsk	Sievierodonetsk	
Kadiivka	urban	Kadiivka	Alchevsk	
Bilovodsk	settlement	Bilovodsk	Starobilsk	
Bilokurakyne	settlement	Bilokurakyne	Svatove	
Lozno-Oleksandrivka	settlement	Lozno-Oleksandrivka	Svatove	
Kreminna	urban	Kreminna	Sievierodonetsk	
Krasnorichenske	settlement	Krasnorichenske	Svatove	
Lutuhyne	urban	Lutuhyne	Luhansk	
Markivka	settlement	Markivka	Starobilsk	
Milove	settlement	Milove	Starobilsk	
Shchastia	urban	Shchastia	Shchastia	
Novoaidar	settlement	Novoaidar	Shchastia	
Bilolutsk	settlement	Bilolutsk	Starobilsk	
Novopskov	settlement	Novopskov	Starobilsk	
Hirske	urban	Hirske	Sievierodonetsk	
Popasna	urban	Popasna	Sievierodonetsk	
Svatove	urban	Svatove	Svatove	
Nyzhnia Duvanka	settlement	Nyzhnia Duvanka	Svatove	
Kolomyichykha	rural	Kolomyichykha	Svatove	
Zymohiria	urban	Zymohiria	Alchevsk	
Stanytsia Luhanska	settlement	Stanytsia Luhanska	Shchastia	
Nyzhnioteple	rural	Nyzhnioteple	Shchastia	
Shyrokyi	rural	Shyrokyi	Shchastia	
Starobilsk	urban	Starobilsk	Starobilsk	
Chmyrivka	rural	Chmyrivka	Starobilsk	
Shulhynka	rural	Shulhynka	Starobilsk	
Troitske	settlement	Troitske	Svatove	

Hromadas that were occupied before the 2022 Russian Invasion of Ukraine

== Lviv Oblast ==
Hromada	Type	Center	Raion	Raion before 2020
Belz	urban	Belz	Chervonohrad	Sokal
Bibrka	urban	Bibrka	Lviv	Peremyshliany
Biskovychi	rural	Biskovychi	Sambir	Sambir
Borynia	settlement	Borynia	Sambir	Turka
Boryslav	urban	Boryslav	Drohobych	Boryslav Municipality
Brody	urban	Brody	Zolochiv	Brody
Busk	urban	Busk	Zolochiv	Busk
Chervonohrad	urban	Chervonohrad	Chervonohrad	Chervonohrad Municipality
Davydiv	rural	Davydiv	Lviv	Pustomyty
Dobromyl	urban	Dobromyl	Sambir	Staryi Sambir
Dobrosyn-Maheriv	settlement	Maheriv	Lviv	Zhovkva
Dobrotvir	settlement	Dobrotvir	Chervonohrad	Kamianka-Buzka
Drohobych	urban	Drohobych	Drohobych	Drohobych Municipality
Hlyniany	urban	Hlyniany	Lviv	Zolochiv
Hnizdychiv	settlement	Hnizdychiv	Stryi	Zhydachiv
Horodok	urban	Horodok	Lviv	Horodok
Hrabovets-Duliby	rural	Duliby	Stryi	Stryi
Ivano-Frankove	settlement	Ivano-Frankove	Yavoriv	Yavoriv
Kamianka-Buzka	urban	Kamianka-Buzka	Lviv	Kamianka-Buzka
Khodoriv	urban	Khodoriv	Stryi	Zhydachiv
Khyriv	urban	Khyriv	Sambir	Staryi Sambir
Komarno	urban	Komarno	Lviv	Horodok
Koziova	rural	Kozova	Stryi	Skole
Krasne	settlement	Krasne	Zolochiv	Busk
Kulykiv	settlement	Kulykiv	Lviv	Zhovkva
Lopatyn	settlement	Lopatyn	Chervonohrad	Radekhiv
Lviv	urban	Lviv	Lviv	Lviv Municipality
Medenychi	settlement	Medenychi	Drohobych	Drohobych
Morshyn	urban	Morshyn	Stryi	city of Morshyn
Mostyska	urban	Mostyska	Yavoriv	Mostyska
Murovane	rural	Soroky-Lvivski	Lviv	Pustomyty
Mykolaiv	urban	Mykolaiv	Stryi	Mykolaiv
Novoiavorivsk	urban	Novoiavorivsk	Yavoriv	Yavoriv
Novyi Kalyniv	urban	Novyi Kalyniv	Sambir	Sambir
Novyi Rozdil	urban	Novyi Rozdil	Stryi	city of Novyi Rozdil
Novyi Yarychiv	settlement	Novyi Yarychiv	Lviv	Kamianka-Buzka
Obroshyne	rural	Obroshyne	Lviv	Pustomyty
Peremyshliany	urban	Peremyshliany	Lviv	Peremyshliany
Pidberiztsi	rural	Pidberiztsi	Lviv	Pustomyty
Pidkamin	settlement	Pidkamin	Zolochiv	Brody
Pomoriany	settlement	Pomoriany	Zolochiv	Zolochiv
Pustomyty	urban	Pustomyty	Lviv	Pustomyty
Radekhiv	urban	Radekhiv	Chervonohrad	Radekhiv
Ralivka	rural	Ralivka	Sambir	Sambir
Rava-Ruska	urban	Rava-Ruska	Lviv	Zhovkva
Rozvadiv	rural	Rozvadiv	Stryi	Mykolaiv
Rudky	urban	Rudky	Sambir	Sambir
Sambir	urban	Sambir	Sambir	city of Sambir
Shchyrets	settlement	Shchyrets	Lviv	Pustomyty
Shehyni	rural	Shehyni	Yavoriv	Mostyska
Skhidnytsia	settlement	Skhidnytsia	Drohobych	Boryslav Municipality
Skole	urban	Skole	Stryi	Skole
Slavske	settlement	Slavske	Stryi	Skole
Sokal	urban	Sokal	Chervonohrad	Sokal
Sokilnyky	rural	Sokilnyky	Lviv	Pustomyty
Solonka	rural	Solonka	Lviv	Pustomyty
Staryi Sambir	urban	Staryi Sambir	Sambir	Staryi Sambir
Strilky	rural	Strilky	Sambir	Staryi Sambir
Stryi	urban	Stryi	Stryi	city of Stryi
Sudova Vyshnia	urban	Sudova Vyshnia	Yavoriv	Mostyska
Trostianets	rural	Trostianets	Stryi	Mykolaiv
Truskavets	urban	Truskavets	Drohobych	city of Truskavets
Turka	urban	Turka	Sambir	Turka
Velyki Mosty	urban	Velyki Mosty	Chervonohrad	Sokal
Velykyi Liubin	settlement	Velykyi Liubin	Lviv	Horodok
Yavoriv	urban	Yavoriv	Yavoriv	Yavoriv
Zabolottsi	rural	Zabolottsi	Zolochiv	Brody
Zhovkva	urban	Zhovkva	Lviv	Zhovkva
Zhovtantsi	rural	Zhovtantsi	Lviv	Kamianka-Buzka
Zhuravne	settlement	Zhuravne	Stryi	Zhydachiv
Zhydachiv	urban	Zhydachiv	Stryi	Zhydachiv
Zolochiv	urban	Zolochiv	Zolochiv	Zolochiv
Zymna Voda	rural	Zymna Voda	Lviv	Pustomyty

== Mykolaiv Oblast ==
Hromada	Type	Center	Raion	Raion before 2020
Arbuzynka	settlement	Arbuzynka	Pervomaisk	Arbuzynka
Bashtanka	urban	Bashtanka	Bashtanka	Bashtanka
Berezanka	settlement	Berezanka	Mykolaiv	Berezanka
Bereznehuvate	settlement	Bereznehuvate	Bashtanka	Bereznehuvate
Blahodatne	rural	Blahodatne	Pervomaisk	Arbuzynka
Bratske	settlement	Bratske	Voznesensk	Bratske
Buzke	rural	Buzke	Voznesensk	Voznesensk
Chornomorka	rural	Chornomorka	Mykolaiv	Ochakiv
Domanivka	settlement	Domanivka	Voznesensk	Domanivka
Doroshivka	rural	Doroshivka	Voznesensk	Voznesensk
Halytsynove	rural	Halytsynove	Mykolaiv	Vitovka
Horokhivske	rural	Horokhivske	Bashtanka	Snihurivka
Inhulka	rural	Inhulka	Bashtanka	Bashtanka
Kamianyi Mist	rural	Kamianyi Mist	Pervomaisk	Pervomaisk
Kazanka	settlement	Kazanka	Bashtanka	Kazanka
Kobleve	rural	Kobleve	Mykolaiv	Berezanka
Kostiantynivka	rural	Kostiantynivka	Mykolaiv	Nova Odesa
Kryve Ozero	settlement	Kryve Ozero	Pervomaisk	Kryve Ozero
Kutsurub	rural	Kutsurub	Mykolaiv	Ochakiv
Mishkovo-Pohorilove	rural	Mishkovo-Pohorilove	Mykolaiv	Vitovka
Mostove	rural	Mostove	Voznesensk	Domanivka
Myhiia	rural	Myhiia	Pervomaisk	Pervomaisk
Mykolaiv	urban	Mykolaiv	Mykolaiv	City of Mykolaiv
Nechaiane	rural	Nechaiane	Mykolaiv	Mykolaiv
Nova Odesa	urban	Nova Odesa	Mykolaiv	Nova Odesa
Novomaryivka	rural	Novomaryivka	Voznesensk	Bratske
Novyi Buh	urban	Novyi Buh	Bashtanka	Novyi Buh
Ochakiv	urban	Ochakiv	Mykolaiv	City of Ochakiv
Oleksandrivka	settlement	Oleksandrivka	Voznesensk	Voznesensk
Olshanske	settlement	Olshanske	Mykolaiv	Mykolaiv
Pervomaisk	urban	Pervomaisk	Pervomaisk	City of Pervomaisk
Pervomaiske	settlement	Pervomaiske	Mykolaiv	Vitovka
Prybuzhany	rural	Prybuzhany	Voznesensk	Voznesensk
Prybuzhzhia	rural	Prybuzhzhia	Voznesensk	Domanivka
Pryvilne	rural	Pryvilne	Bashtanka	Bashtanka
Radisnyi Sad	rural	Radisnyi Sad	Mykolaiv	Mykolaiv
Shevchenkove	rural	Shevchenkove	Mykolaiv	Vitovka
Shyroke	rural	Shyroke	Bashtanka	Snihurivka
Snihurivka	urban	Snihurivka	Bashtanka	Snihurivka
Sofiivka	rural	Sofiivka	Bashtanka	Novyi Buh
Stepove	rural	Stepove	Mykolaiv	Mykolaiv
Sukhyi Yelanets	rural	Sukhyi Yelanets	Mykolaiv	Nova Odesa
Syniukhyn Brid	rural	Syniukhyn Brid	Pervomaisk	Pervomaisk
Veselynove	settlement	Veselynove	Voznesensk	Veselynove
Vesniane	rural	Vesniane	Mykolaiv	Mykolaiv
Vilne Zaporizhzhia	rural	Vilne Zaporizhzhia	Bashtanka	Novyi Buh
Volodymyrivka	rural	Volodymyrivka	Bashtanka	Kazanka
Voskresenske	settlement	Voskresenske	Mykolaiv	Vitovka
Voznesensk	urban	Voznesensk	Voznesensk	City of Voznesensk
Vradiivka	settlement	Vradiivka	Pervomaisk	Vradiivka
Yelanets	settlement	Yelanets	Voznesensk	Yelanets
Yuzhnoukrainsk	urban	Pivdennoukrainsk	Voznesensk	City of Yuzhnoukrainsk

== Odesa Oblast ==
Hromada	Type	Center	Raion	Raion before 2020
Ananiv	urban	Ananiv	Podilsk	Ananiv
Andriievo-Ivanivka	rural	Andriivo-Ivanivka	Berezivka	Mykolaivka
Artsyz	urban	Artsyz	Bolhrad	Artsyz
Avanhard	settlement	Avanhard	Odesa	Ovidiopol
Balta	urban	Balta	Podilsk	Balta Municipality
Berezivka	urban	Berezivka	Berezivka	Berezivka
Bilhorod-Dnistrovskyi	urban	Bilhorod-Dnistrovskyi	Bilhorod-Dnistrovskyi	Bilhorod-Dnistrovskyi Municipality
Biliaivka	urban	Biliaivka	Odesa	Biliaivka Municipality
Bolhrad	urban	Bolhrad	Bolhrad	Bolhrad
Borodino	settlement	Budzhak	Bolhrad	Tarutyne
Chohodarivka	rural	Chohodarivka	Berezivka	Shyriaieve
Chornomorsk	urban	Chornomorsk	Odesa	Illichivsk Municipality
Chornomorske	settlement	Chornomorske	Odesa	Lyman
Dachne	rural	Dachne	Odesa	Biliaivka
Dalnyk	rural	Dalnyk	Odesa	Ovidiopol
Dobroslav	settlement	Dobroslav	Odesa	Lyman
Dolynske	rural	Dolynske	Podilsk	Ananiv
Dyviziia	rural	Dyviziia	Bilhorod-Dnistrovskyi	Tatarbunary
Fontanka	rural	Fontanka	Odesa	Lyman
Horodnie	rural	Horodnie	Bolhrad	Bolhrad
Ivanivka	settlement	Ivanivka	Berezivka	Ivanivka
Izmail	urban	Izmail	Izmail	City of Izmail
Karolino-Buhaz	rural	Karolino-Buhaz	Bilhorod-Dnistrovskyi	Ovidiopol
Kiliia	urban	Kiliia	Izmail	Kiliia
Kodyma	urban	Kodyma	Podilsk	Kodyma
Konopliane	rural	Konopliane	Berezivka	Ivanivka
Krasnosilka	rural	Krasnosilka	Odesa	Lyman
Krynychne	rural	Krynychne	Bolhrad	Bolhrad
Kubei	rural	Kubei	Bolhrad	Bolhrad
Kuialnyk	rural	Kuialnyk	Podilsk	Podilsk
Kulevcha	rural	Kulevcha	Bilhorod-Dnistrovskyi	Sarata
Kurisove	rural	Kurisove	Berezivka	Lyman
Liubashivka	settlement	Liubashivka	Podilsk	Liubashivka
Lyman	rural	Lyman	Bilhorod-Dnistrovskyi	Tatarbunary
Lymanske	settlement	Lymanske	Rozdilna	Rozdilna
Maiaky	rural	Maiaky	Odesa	Biliaivka
Marazliivka	rural	Marazliivka	Bilhorod-Dnistrovskyi	Bilhorod-Dnistrovskyi
Moloha	rural	Moloha	Bilhorod-Dnistrovskyi	Bilhorod-Dnistrovskyi
Mykolaivka	settlement	Mykolaivka	Berezivka	Mykolaivka
Nerubaiske	rural	Nerubaiske	Odesa	Biliaivka
Novoborysivka	rural	Novoborysivka	Rozdilna	Velyka Mykhailivka
Novokalcheve	rural	Novokalcheve	Berezivka	Berezivka
Odesa	urban	Odesa	Odesa	City of Odesa
Okny	settlement	Okny	Podilsk	Okny
Ovidiopol	settlement	Ovidiopol	Odesa	Ovidiopol
Pavlivka	rural	Pavlivka	Bolhrad	Artsyz
Petropavlivka	rural	Petropavlivka	Bilhorod-Dnistrovskyi	Sarata
Petrovirivka	rural	Petrovirivka	Berezivka	Shyriaieve
Pishchana	rural	Pishchana	Podilsk	Balta
Plakhtiivka	rural	Plakhtiivka	Bilhorod-Dnistrovskyi	Sarata
Podilsk	urban	Podilsk	Podilsk	City of Podilsk
Raukhivka	settlement	Raukhivka	Berezivka	Berezivka
Reni	urban	Reni	Izmail	Reni
Rozdilna	urban	Rozdilna	Rozdilna	Rozdilna
Rozkvit	rural	Rozkvit	Berezivka	Berezivka
Safiany	rural	Safiany	Izmail	Izmail
Sarata	settlement	Sarata	Bilhorod-Dnistrovskyi	Sarata
Savran	settlement	Savran	Podilsk	Savran
Serhiivka	settlement	Serhiivka	Bilhorod-Dnistrovskyi	Bilhorod-Dnistrovskyi; Bilhorod-Dnistrovskyi Municipality
Shabo	rural	Shabo	Bilhorod-Dnistrovskyi	Bilhorod-Dnistrovskyi
Shyriaieve	settlement	Shyriaieve	Berezivka	Shyriaieve
Slobidka	settlement	Slobidka	Podilsk	Kodyma
Stari Maiaky	rural	Stari Maiaky	Berezivka	Shyriaieve
Starokozache	rural	Starokozache	Bilhorod-Dnistrovskyi	Bilhorod-Dnistrovskyi
Stepanivka	rural	Stepanivka	Rozdilna	Rozdilna
Striukove	rural	Striukove	Berezivka	Mykolaivka
Suvorove	settlement	Suvorove	Izmail	Izmail
Tairove	settlement	Tairove	Odesa	Ovidiopol
Tarutyne	settlement	Bessarabske	Bolhrad	Tarutyne
Tatarbunary	urban	Tatarbunary	Bilhorod-Dnistrovskyi	Tatarbunary
Teplodar	urban	Teplodar	Odesa	City of Teplodar
Teplytsia	rural	Teplytsia	Bolhrad	Artsyz
Tsebrykove	settlement	Tsebrykove	Rozdilna	Velyka Mykhailivka
Tuzly	rural	Tuzly	Bilhorod-Dnistrovskyi	Tatarbunary
Usatove	rural	Usatove	Odesa	Biliaivka
Uspenivka	rural	Uspenivka	Bilhorod-Dnistrovskyi	Sarata
Vasylivka	rural	Vasylivka	Bolhrad	Bolhrad
Velyka Mykhailivka	settlement	Velyka Mykhailivka	Rozdilna	Velyka Mykhailivka
Velykodolynske	settlement	Velykodolynske	Odesa	Ovidiopol
Velykoploske	rural	Velykoploske	Rozdilna	Velyka Mykhailivka
Velykyi Buialyk	rural	Velykyi Buialyk	Berezivka	Ivanivka
Velykyi Dalnyk	rural	Velykyi Dalnyk	Odesa	Biliaivka
Vyhoda	rural	Vyhoda	Odesa	Biliaivka
Vylkove	urban	Vylkove	Izmail	Kiliia
Vyzyrka	rural	Vyzyrka	Odesa	Lyman
Yasky	rural	Yasky	Odesa	Biliaivka
Yuzhne	urban	Pivdenne	Odesa	Lyman; City of Yuzhne
Zakharivka	settlement	Zakharivka	Rozdilna	Zakharivka
Zatyshshia	settlement	Zatyshshia	Rozdilna	Zakharivka
Zelenohirske	settlement	Zelenohirske	Podilsk	Liubashivka
Znamianka	rural	Znamianka	Berezivka	Ivanivka

== Poltava Oblast ==
Hromada	Type	Center	Raion	Raion before 2020
Poltava	urban	Poltava	Poltava	Poltava; City of Poltava
Horishni Plavni	urban	Horishni Plavni	Kremenchuk	Kremenchuk; City of Horishni Plavni
Hadiach	urban	Hadiach	Myrhorod	Hadiach; City of Hadiach
Kremenchuk	urban	Kremenchuk	Kremenchuk	Kremenchuk; City of Kremenchuk
Lubny	urban	Lubny	Lubny	Lubny; City of Lubny
Myrhorod	urban	Myrhorod	Myrhorod	Myrhorod; City of Myrhorod
Velyka Bahachka	settlement	Velyka Bahachka	Myrhorod	
Hoholeve	settlement	Hoholeve	Myrhorod	
Bilotserkivka	rural	Bilotserkivka	Myrhorod	
Velyki Budyshcha	rural	Velyki Budyshcha	Myrhorod	Hadiach
Krasna Luka	rural	Krasna Luka	Myrhorod	Hadiach
Liutenka	rural	Liutenka	Myrhorod	Hadiach
Petrivka-Romenska	rural	Petrivka-Romenska	Myrhorod	Hadiach
Serhiivka	rural	Serhiivka	Myrhorod	Hadiach
Hlobyne	urban	Hlobyne	Kremenchuk	Hlobyne
Hradyzk	settlement	Hradyzk	Kremenchuk	Hlobyne
Hrebinka	urban	Hrebinka	Lubny	Hrebinka
Dykanka	settlement	Dykanka	Poltava	Dykanka
Zinkiv	urban	Zinkiv	Poltava	
Opishnia	settlement	Opishnia	Poltava	
Karlivka	urban	Karlivka	Poltava	Karlivka
Lanna	rural	Lanna	Poltava	Karlivka
Martynivka	rural	Martynivka	Poltava	Karlivka
Kobeliaky	urban	Kobeliaky	Poltava	Kobeliaky
Bilyky	settlement	Bilyky	Poltava	Kobeliaky
Kozelshchyna	settlement	Kozelshchyna	Kremenchuk	Kozelshchyna
Nova Haleshchyna	settlement	Nova Haleshchyna	Kremenchuk	Kozelshchyna
Kotelva	settlement	Kotelva	Poltava	Kotelva
Velyka Rublivka	rural	Velyka Rublivka	Poltava	Kotelva
Kamiani Potoky	rural	Kamiani Potoky	Kremenchuk	Kremenchuk
Omelnyk	rural	Omelnyk	Kremenchuk	Kremenchuk
Pishchane	rural	Pishchane	Kremenchuk	Kremenchuk
Pryshyb	rural	Pryshyb	Kremenchuk	Kremenchuk
Zavodske	urban	Zavodske	Myrhorod	Lokhvytsia
Lokhvytsia	urban	Lokhvytsia	Myrhorod	Lokhvytsia
Sencha	rural	Sencha	Myrhorod	Lokhvytsia
Mashivka	settlement	Mashivka	Poltava	Mashivka
Mykhailivka	rural	Mykhailivka	Poltava	Mashivka
Komyshnia	settlement	Komyshnia	Myrhorod	Myrhorod
Romodan	settlement	Romodan	Myrhorod	Myrhorod
Velyki Sorochyntsi	rural	Velyki Sorochyntsi	Myrhorod	Myrhorod
Novi Sanzhary	settlement	Novi Sanzhary	Poltava	Novi Sanzhary
Drabynivka	rural	Drabynivka	Poltava	Novi Sanzhary
Nekhvoroshcha	rural	Nekhvoroshcha	Poltava	Novi Sanzhary
Novoorzhytske	settlement	Novoorzhytske	Lubny	
Orzhytsia	settlement	Orzhytsia	Lubny	
Pyriatyn	urban	Pyriatyn	Lubny	
Kolomatske	rural	Kolomatske	Poltava	Poltava
Machukhy	rural	Machukhy	Poltava	Poltava
Novoselivka	rural	Novoselivka	Poltava	Poltava
Tereshky	rural	Tereshky	Poltava	Poltava
Shcherbani	rural	Shcherbani	Poltava	Poltava
Reshetylivka	urban	Reshetylivka	Poltava	
Semenivka	settlement	Semenivka	Kremenchuk	
Obolon	rural	Obolon	Kremenchuk	
Khorol	urban	Khorol	Lubny	Khorol
Chornukhy	settlement	Chornukhy	Lubny	Chornukhy
Skorokhodove	settlement	Skorokhodove	Poltava	Chutove
Chutove	settlement	Chutove	Poltava	Chutove
Shyshaky	settlement	Shyshaky	Myrhorod	

== Rivne Oblast ==
Hromada	Type	Center	Raion	Raion before 2020
Rivne	urban	Rivne	Rivne	
Dubno	urban	Dubno	Dubno	
Varash	urban	Varash	Varash	
Ostroh	urban	Ostroh	Rivne	
Berezne	urban	Berezne	Rivne	
Sosnove	settlement	Sosnove	Rivne	
Malynsk	rural	Malynsk	Rivne	
Volodymyrets	settlement	Volodymyrets	Varash	
Rafalivka	settlement	Rafalivka	Varash	
Antonivka	rural	Antonivka	Varash	
Kanonychi	rural	Kanonychi	Varash	
Polytsi	rural	Polytsi	Varash	
Hoshcha	settlement	Hoshcha	Rivne	
Babyn	rural	Babyn	Rivne	
Buhryn	rural	Buhryn	Rivne	
Demydivka	settlement	Demydivka	Dubno	
Boremel	rural	Boremel	Dubno	
Smyha	settlement	Smyha	Dubno	
Varkovychi	rural	Varkovychi	Dubno	
Verba	rural	Verba	Dubno	
Myrohoshcha	rural	Myrohoshcha Persha	Dubno	
Povcha	rural	Povcha	Dubno	
Pryvilne	rural	Pryvilne	Dubno	
Semyduby	rural	Semyduby	Dubno	
Tarakaniv	rural	Tarakaniv	Dubno	
Dubrovytsia	urban	Dubrovytsia	Sarny	
Vysotsk	rural	Vysotsk	Sarny	
Myliach	rural	Myliach	Sarny	
Zarichne	settlement	Zarichne	Varash	
Loknytsia	rural	Loknytsia	Varash	
Zdolbuniv	urban	Zdolbuniv	Rivne	
Mizoch	settlement	Mizoch	Rivne	
Zdovbytsia	rural	Zdovbytsia	Rivne	
Korets	urban	Korets	Rivne	
Velyki Mezhyrichi	rural	Velyki Mezhyrichi	Rivne	
Kostopil	urban	Kostopil	Rivne	
Holovyn	rural	Holovyn	Rivne	
Derazhne	rural	Derazhne	Rivne	
Mala Liubasha	rural	Mala Liubasha	Rivne	
Mlyniv	settlement	Mlyniv	Dubno	
Bokiima	rural	Bokiima	Dubno	
Ostrozhets	rural	Ostrozhets	Dubno	
Pidloztsi	rural	Pidloztsi	Dubno	
Yaroslavychi	rural	Yaroslavychi	Dubno	
Klevan	settlement	Klevan	Rivne	
Bila Krynytsia	rural	Bila Krynytsia	Rivne	
Velyka Omeliana	rural	Velyka Omeliana	Rivne	
Horodok	rural	Horodok	Rivne	
Diadkovychi	rural	Diadkovychi	Rivne	
Zoria	rural	Zoria	Rivne	
Kornyn	rural	Kornyn	Rivne	
Oleksandriia	rural	Oleksandriia	Rivne	
Shpaniv	rural	Shpaniv	Rivne	
Rokytne	settlement	Rokytne	Sarny	
Berezove	rural	Berezove	Sarny	
Stare Selo	rural	Stare Selo	Sarny	
Sarny	urban	Sarny	Sarny	
Klesiv	settlement	Klesiv	Sarny	
Stepan	settlement	Stepan	Sarny	
Vyry	rural	Vyry	Sarny	
Nemovychi	rural	Nemovychi	Sarny	
Radyvyliv	urban	Radyvyliv	Dubno	
Kozyn	rural	Kozyn	Dubno	
Krupets	rural	Krupets	Dubno	

== Sevastopol ==
Hromada	Type	Center	Raion	Raion before 2020
Sevastopol	urban	Sevastopol	–	–

== Sumy Oblast ==
Hromada	Type	Center	Raion	Raion before 2020
Andriiashivka	rural	Andriiashivka	Romny	Romny
Bereza	rural	Bereza	Shostka	Shostka
Bezdryk	rural	Bezdryk	Sumy	Sumy
Bilopillia	urban	Bilopillia	Sumy	Bilopillia
Bochechky	rural	Bochechky	Konotop	Konotop
Boromlia	rural	Boromlia	Okhtyrka	Trostianets
Buryn	urban	Buryn	Konotop	Buryn
Chernechchyna	rural	Chernechchyna	Okhtyrka	Okhtyrka
Chupakhivka	settlement	Chupakhivka	Okhtyrka	Okhtyrka
Khutir-Mykhailivskyi	urban	Khutir-Mykhailivskyi	Shostka	Yampil
Duboviazivka	settlement	Duboviazivka	Konotop	Konotop
Esman	settlement	Esman	Shostka	Hlukhiv
Hlukhiv	urban	Hlukhiv	Shostka	Hlukhiv Municipality
Hrun	rural	Hrun	Okhtyrka	Okhtyrka
Khmeliv	rural	Khmeliv	Romny	Romny
Khotin	settlement	Khotin	Sumy	Sumy
Komyshi	rural	Komyshi	Okhtyrka	Sumy
Konotop	urban	Konotop	Konotop	Konotop Municipality
Korovyntsi	rural	Korovyntsi	Romny	Nedryhailiv
Krasnopillia	settlement	Krasnopillia	Sumy	Krasnopillia
Krolevets	urban	Krolevets	Konotop	Krolevets
Kyrykivka	settlement	Kyrykivka	Okhtyrka	Velyka Pysarivka
Lebedyn	urban	Lebedyn	Sumy	Lebedyn
Lypova Dolyna	settlement	Lypova Dolyna	Romny	Lypova Dolyna
Mykolaivka	settlement	Mykolaivka	Sumy	Bilopillia
Mykolaivka	rural	Mykolaivka	Sumy	Sumy
Myropillia	rural	Myropillia	Sumy	Krasnopillia
Nedryhailiv	settlement	Nedryhailiv	Romny	Nedryhailiv
Nova Sloboda	rural	Nova Sloboda	Konotop	Putyvl
Nyzhnia Syrovatka	rural	Nyzhnia Syrovatka	Sumy	Sumy
Okhtyrka	urban	Okhtyrka	Okhtyrka	Okhtyrka Municipality
Popivka	rural	Popivka	Konotop	Konotop
Putyvl	urban	Putyvl	Konotop	Putyvl
Richky	rural	Richky	Sumy	Bilopillia
Romny	urban	Romny	Romny	Romny Municipality
Sad	rural	Sad	Sumy	Sumy
Seredyna-Buda	urban	Seredyna-Buda	Shostka	Seredyna-Buda
Shalyhyne	settlement	Shalyhyne	Shostka	Hlukhiv
Shostka	urban	Shostka	Shostka	Shostka Municipality
Stepanivka	settlement	Stepanivka	Sumy	Sumy
Sumy	urban	Sumy	Sumy	Sumy Municipality
Svesa	settlement	Svesa	Shostka	Yampil
Synivka	rural	Synivka	Romny	Lypova Dolyna
Trostianets	urban	Trostianets	Okhtyrka	Trostianets
Velyka Pysarivka	settlement	Velyka Pysarivka	Okhtyrka	Velyka Pysarivka
Verkhnia Syrovatka	rural	Verkhnia Syrovatka	Sumy	Sumy
Vilshana	rural	Vilshana	Romny	Nedryhailiv
Vorozhba	urban	Vorozhba	Sumy	Bilopillia
Yampil	settlement	Yampil	Shostka	Yampil
Yunakivka	rural	Yunakivka	Sumy	Sumy
Znob-Novhorodske	settlement	Znob-Novhorodske	Shostka	Seredyna-Buda

== Ternopil Oblast ==
Hromada	Type	Center	Raion	Raion before 2020
Baikivtsi	rural	Baikivtsi	Ternopil	Ternopil
Berezhany	urban	Berezhany	Ternopil	Berezhany; Berezhany Municipality
Bila	rural	Bila	Ternopil	Ternopil
Bilche-Zolote	rural	Bilche-Zolote	Chortkiv	Borshchiv
Bilobozhnytsia	rural	Bilobozhnytsia	Chortkiv	Chortkiv
Borshchiv	urban	Borshchiv	Chortkiv	Borshchiv
Borsuky	rural	Borsuky	Kremenets	Lanivtsi
Buchach	urban	Buchach	Chortkiv	Buchach
Chortkiv	urban	Chortkiv	Chortkiv	Chortkiv city of Chortkiv
Hrymailiv	settlement	Hrymailiv	Chortkiv	Husiatyn
Husiatyn	settlement	Husiatyn	Chortkiv	Husiatyn
Ivane-Puste	rural	Ivane-Puste	Chortkiv	Borshchiv
Ivanivka	rural	Ivanivka	Ternopil	Terebovlia
Khorostkiv	urban	Khorostkiv	Chortkiv	Husiatyn
Kolyndiany	rural	Kolyndiany	Chortkiv	Chortkiv
Kopychyntsi	urban	Kopychyntsi	Chortkiv	Husiatyn
Koropets	settlement	Koropets	Chortkiv	Monastyryska
Kozliv	settlement	Kozliv	Ternopil	Kozova
Kozova	settlement	Kozova	Ternopil	Kozova
Kremenets	urban	Kremenets	Kremenets	Kremenets city of Kremenets
Kupchyntsi	rural	Kupchyntsi	Ternopil	Kozova
Lanivtsi	urban	Lanivtsi	Kremenets	Lanivtsi
Lopushne	rural	Lopushne	Kremenets	Kremenets
Melnytsia-Podilska	settlement	Melnytsia-Podilska	Chortkiv	Borshchiv
Monastyryska	urban	Monastyryska	Chortkiv	Monastyryska
Mykulyntsi	settlement	Mykulyntsi	Ternopil	Terebovlia
Nahirianka	rural	Nahirianka	Chortkiv	Chortkiv
Naraiv	rural	Naraiv	Ternopil	Berezhany
Ozerna	rural	Ozerna	Ternopil	Zboriv
Pidhaitsi	urban	Pidhaitsi	Ternopil	Pidhaitsi
Pidhorodne	rural	Pidhorodne	Ternopil	Ternopil
Pidvolochysk	settlement	Pidvolochysk	Ternopil	Pidvolochysk
Pochaiv	urban	Pochaiv	Kremenets	Kremenets
Saranchuky	rural	Saranchuky	Ternopil	Berezhany
Shumsk	urban	Shumsk	Kremenets	Shumsk
Skala-Podilska	settlement	Skala-Podilska	Chortkiv	Borshchiv
Skalat	urban	Skalat	Ternopil	Pidvolochysk
Skoryky	rural	Skoryky	Ternopil	Pidvolochysk
Terebovlia	urban	Terebovlia	Ternopil	Terebovlia
Ternopil	urban	Ternopil	Ternopil	city of Ternopil; Zboriv
Tovste	settlement	Tovste	Chortkiv	Zalishchyky
Trybukhivtsi	rural	Trybukhivtsi	Chortkiv	Buchach
Vasylkivtsi	rural	Vasylkivtsi	Chortkiv	Husiatyn
Velyka Berezovytsia	settlement	Velyka Berezovytsia	Ternopil	Ternopil
Velyki Birky	settlement	Velyki Birky	Ternopil	Ternopil
Velyki Dederkaly	rural	Velyki Dederkaly	Kremenets	Shumsk
Velyki Hai	rural	Velyki Hai	Ternopil	Ternopil
Vyshnivets	settlement	Vyshnivets	Kremenets	Zbarazh
Zalishchyky	urban	Zalishchyky	Chortkiv	Zalishchyky
Zaliztsi	settlement	Zaliztsi	Ternopil	Zboriv
Zavodske	settlement	Zavodske	Chortkiv	Chortkiv
Zbarazh	urban	Zbarazh	Ternopil	Zbarazh
Zboriv	urban	Zboriv	Ternopil	Zboriv
Zolotnyky	rural	Zolotnyky	Ternopil	Terebovlia
Zolotyi Potik	settlement	Zolotyi Potik	Chortkiv	Buchach

== Vinnytsia Oblast ==
Hromada	Type	Center	Raion	Raion before 2020	pop.places
Vinnytsia	urban	Vinnytsia	Vinnytsia		9
Zhmerynka	urban	Zhmerynka	Zhmerynka		34
Mohyliv-Podilskyi	urban	Mohyliv-Podilskyi	Mohyliv-Podilskyi		26
Koziatyn	urban	Koziatyn	Khmilnyk		16
Ladyzhyn	urban	Ladyzhyn	Haisyn		6
Khmilnyk	urban	Khmilnyk	Khmilnyk		42
Bar	urban	Bar	Zhmerynka		70
Kopaihorod	settlement	Kopaihorod	Zhmerynka		21
Bershad	urban	Bershad	Haisyn		29
Dzhulynka	rural	Dzhulynka	Haisyn		16
Voronovytsia	settlement	Voronovytsia	Vinnytsia		21
Stryzhavka	settlement	Stryzhavka	Vinnytsia		13
Ahronomichne	rural	Ahronomichne	Vinnytsia		6
Luka-Meleshivska	rural	Luka-Meleshivska	Vinnytsia		13
Yakushyntsi	rural	Yakushyntsi	Vinnytsia		17
Haisyn	urban	Haisyn	Haisyn		43
Krasnopilka	rural	Krasnopilka	Haisyn		13
Kunka	rural	Kunka	Haisyn		11
Severynivka	rural	Severynivka	Zhmerynka		19
Stanislavchyk	rural	Stanislavchyk	Zhmerynka		16
Illintsi	urban	Illintsi	Vinnytsia		30
Dashiv	settlement	Dashiv	Haisyn		24
Hlukhivtsi	settlement	Hlukhivtsi	Khmilnyk		17
Makhnivka	rural	Makhnivka	Khmilnyk		20
Samhorodok	rural	Samhorodok	Khmilnyk		20
Kalynivka	urban	Kalynivka	Khmilnyk		49
Ivaniv	rural	Ivaniv	Khmilnyk		14
Kryzhopil	settlement	Kryzhopil	Tulchyn		19
Horodkivka	rural	Horodkivka	Tulchyn		25
Lypovets	urban	Lypovets	Vinnytsia		38
Turbiv	settlement	Turbiv	Vinnytsia		22
Lityn	settlement	Lityn	Vinnytsia		36
Vendychany	settlement	Vendychany	Mohyliv-Podilskyi		25
Yaryshiv	rural	Yaryshiv	Mohyliv-Podilskyi		13
Murovani Kurylivtsi	settlement	Murovani Kurylivtsi	Mohyliv-Podilskyi		50
Nemyriv	urban	Nemyriv	Vinnytsia		53
Bratslav	settlement	Bratslav	Tulchyn		19
Rayhorod	rural	Rayhorod	Haisyn		20
Orativ	settlement	Orativ	Vinnytsia		52
Pishchanka	settlement	Pishchanka	Tulchyn		14
Studena	rural	Studena	Tulchyn		15
Pohrebyshche	urban	Pohrebyshche	Vinnytsia		60
Teplyk	settlement	Teplyk	Haisyn		31
Sobolivka	rural	Sobolivka	Haisyn		12
Vapniarka	settlement	Vapniarka	Tulchyn		6
Tomashpil	settlement	Tomashpil	Tulchyn		28
Trostianets	settlement	Trostianets	Haisyn		27
Obodivka	rural	Obodivka	Haisyn		10
Tulchyn	urban	Tulchyn	Tulchyn		36
Shpykiv	settlement	Shpykiv	Tulchyn		27
Hnivan	urban	Hnivan	Vinnytsia		11
Sutysky	settlement	Sutysky	Vinnytsia		3
Tyvriv	settlement	Tyvriv	Vinnytsia		26
Zhdaniv	rural	Viitivtsi	Khmilnyk		15
Ulaniv	rural	Ulaniv	Khmilnyk		36
Chernivtsi	settlement	Chernivtsi	Mohyliv-Podilskyi		30
Babchyntsi	rural	Babchyntsi	Mohyliv-Podilskyi		13
Chechelnyk	settlement	Chechelnyk	Haisyn		17
Olhopil	rural	Olhopil	Haisyn		5
Sharhorod	urban	Sharhorod	Zhmerynka		32
Dzhuryn	rural	Dzhuryn	Zhmerynka		16
Murafa	rural	Murafa	Zhmerynka		7
Yampil	urban	Yampil	Mohyliv-Podilskyi		38

== Volyn Oblast ==
Hromada	Type	Center	Raion	Raion before 2020	pop.places
Lutsk	urban	Lutsk	Lutsk		36
Volodymyr-Volynskyi	urban	Volodymyr	Volodymyr		9
Kovel	urban	Kovel	Kovel		15
Novovolynsk	urban	Novovolynsk	Volodymyr		8
Ustyluh	urban	Ustyluh	Volodymyr		26
Zymne	rural	Zymne	Volodymyr		30
Ovadne	rural	Ovadne	Volodymyr		21
Berestechko	urban	Berestechko	Lutsk		21
Horokhiv	urban	Horokhiv	Lutsk		42
Marianivka	settlement	Marianivka	Lutsk		14
Ivanychi	settlement	Ivanychi	Volodymyr		9
Lytovezh	rural	Lytovezh	Volodymyr		6
Pavlivka	rural	Pavlivka	Volodymyr		20
Poromiv	rural	Poromiv	Volodymyr		18
Kamin-Kashyrskyi	urban	Kamin-Kashyrskyi	Kamin-Kashyrskyi		55
Soshychne	rural	Soshychne	Kamin-Kashyrskyi		12
Kivertsi	urban	Kivertsi	Lutsk		24
Olyka	urban	Olyka	Lutsk		17
Tsuman	settlement	Tsuman	Lutsk		16
Holoby	settlement	Holoby	Kovel		23
Liublynets	settlement	Liublynets	Kovel		9
Velytsk	rural	Velytsk	Kovel		12
Dubove	rural	Dubove	Kovel		10
Kolodiazhne	rural	Kolodiazhne	Kovel		19
Povorsk	rural	Povorsk	Kovel		11
Lokachi	settlement	Lokachi	Volodymyr		28
Zaturtsi	rural	Zaturtsi	Volodymyr		26
Torchyn	settlement	Torchyn	Lutsk		24
Boratyn	rural	Boratyn	Lutsk		24
Horodyshche	rural	Horodyshche	Lutsk		21
Pidhaitsi	rural	Pidhaitsi	Lutsk		20
Liubeshiv	settlement	Liubeshiv	Kamin-Kashyrskyi		41
Liuboml	urban	Liuboml	Kovel		15
Holovne	settlement	Holovne	Kovel		14
Vyshniv	rural	Vyshniv	Kovel		21
Rivne	rural	Rivne	Kovel		17
Kolky	settlement	Kolky	Lutsk		28
Manevychi	settlement	Manevychi	Kamin-Kashyrskyi		36
Prylisne	rural	Prylisne	Kamin-Kashyrskyi		11
Zabolottia	settlement	Zabolottia	Kovel		4
Ratne	settlement	Ratne	Kovel		24
Velymche	rural	Velymche	Kovel		4
Zabrody	rural	Zabrody	Kovel		18
Samary	rural	Samary	Kovel		19
Rozhyshche	urban	Rozhyshche	Lutsk		37
Dorosyni	rural	Dorosyni	Lutsk		13
Kopachivka	rural	Kopachivka	Lutsk		14
Stara Vyzhivka	settlement	Stara Vyzhivka	Kovel		17
Dubechne	rural	Dubechne	Kovel		10
Serekhovychi	rural	Serekhovychi	Kovel		11
Smidyn	rural	Smidyn	Kovel		10
Lukiv	settlement	Lukiv	Kovel		14
Turiisk	settlement	Turiisk	Kovel		52
Shatsk	settlement	Shatsk	Kovel		31

== Zakarpattia Oblast ==
Hromada	Type	Center	Raion	Raion before 2020
Baranyntsi	rural	Baranyntsi	Uzhhorod	
Batiovo	settlement	Batiovo	Berehove	
Bedevlia	rural	Bedevlia	Tiachiv	
Berehove	urban	Berehove	Berehove	
Bilky	rural	Bilky	Khust	
Bohdan	rural	Bohdan	Rakhiv	
Bushtyno	settlement	Bushtyno	Tiachiv	
Chop	urban	Chop	Uzhhorod	
Chynadiiovo	settlement	Chynadiiovo	Mukachevo	
Dovhe	rural	Dovhe	Khust	
Drahovo	rural	Drahovo	Khust	
Dubove	settlement	Dubove	Tiachiv	
Dubrynychi	rural	Dubrynychi	Uzhhorod	
Horinchovo	rural	Horinchovo	Khust	
Horonda	rural	Horonda	Mukachevo	
Irshava	urban	Irshava	Khust	
Ivanivtsi	rural	Ivanivtsi	Mukachevo	
Kamianske	rural	Kamianske	Berehove	
Keretsky	rural	Keretsky	Khust	
Kholmok	rural	Kholmok	Uzhhorod	
Khust	urban	Khust	Khust	
Kolchyno	settlement	Kolchyno	Mukachevo	
Kolochava	rural	Kolochava	Khust	
Korolevo	settlement	Korolevo	Berehove	
Koson	rural	Koson	Berehove	
Kostryna	rural	Kostryna	Uzhhorod	
Mizhhiria	settlement	Mizhhiria	Khust	
Mukachevo	urban	Mukachevo	Mukachevo	
Nelipyno	rural	Nelipyno	Mukachevo	
Neresnytsia	rural	Neresnytsia	Tiachiv	
Nyzhni Vorota	rural	Nyzhni Vorota	Mukachevo	
Onokivtsi	rural	Onokivtsi	Uzhhorod	
Perechyn	urban	Perechyn	Uzhhorod	
Poliana	rural	Poliana	Mukachevo	
Pyiterfolvo	rural	Pyiterfolvo	Berehove	
Pylypets	rural	Pylypets	Khust	
Rakhiv	urban	Rakhiv	Rakhiv	
Serednie	settlement	Serednie	Uzhhorod	
Siurte	rural	Siurte	Uzhhorod	
Solotvyno	settlement	Solotvyno	Tiachiv	
Stavne	rural	Stavne	Uzhhorod	
Svaliava	urban	Svaliava	Mukachevo	
Synevyr	rural	Synevyr	Khust	
Teresva	settlement	Teresva	Tiachiv	
Tiachiv	urban	Tiachiv	Tiachiv	
Turi Remety	rural	Turi Remety	Uzhhorod	
Uhlia	rural	Uhlia	Tiachiv	
Ust-Chorna	settlement	Ust-Chorna	Tiachiv	
Uzhhorod	urban	Uzhhorod	Uzhhorod	
Velyka Bihan	rural	Velyka Bihan	Berehove	
Velyka Dobron	rural	Velyka Dobron	Uzhhorod	
Velyki Berehy	rural	Velyki Berehy	Berehove	
Velyki Luchky	rural	Velyki Luchky	Mukachevo	
Velykyi Bereznyi	settlement	Velykyi Bereznyi	Uzhhorod	
Velykyi Bychkiv	settlement	Velykyi Bychkiv	Rakhiv	
Verkhni Koropets	rural	Verkhni Koropets	Mukachevo	
Vilkhivtsi	rural	Vilkhivtsi	Tiachiv	
Volovets	settlement	Volovets	Mukachevo	
Vylok	settlement	Vylok	Berehove	
Vynohradiv	urban	Vynohradiv	Berehove	
Vyshkovo	settlement	Vyshkovo	Khust	
Yasinia	settlement	Yasinia	Rakhiv	
Zarichia	rural	Zarichia	Khust	
Zhdeniievo	settlement	Zhdeniievo	Mukachevo	

== Zaporizhzhia Oblast ==
Hromada	Type	Center	Raion	Raion before 2020
Zaporizhzhia	urban	Zaporizhzhia	Zaporizhzhia	
Berdiansk	urban	Berdiansk	Berdiansk	
Melitopol	urban	Melitopol	Melitopol	
Tokmak	urban	Tokmak	Polohy	
Enerhodar	urban	Enerhodar	Vasylivka	
Kyrylivka	settlement	Kyrylivka	Melitopol	
Yakymivka	settlement	Yakymivka	Melitopol	
Andriivka	settlement	Andriivka	Berdiansk	
Andrivka	rural	Andrivka	Berdiansk	
Berestove	rural	Berestove	Berdiansk	
Osypenko	rural	Osypenko	Berdiansk	
Vasylivka	urban	Vasylivka	Vasylivka	
Dniprorudne	urban	Dniprorudne	Vasylivka	
Stepnohirsk	settlement	Stepnohirsk	Vasylivka	
Mala Bilozerka	rural	Mala Bilozerka	Vasylivka	
Velyka Bilozerka	rural	Velyka Bilozerka	Vasylivka	
Vesele	settlement	Vesele	Melitopol	
Novouspenivka	rural	Novouspenivka	Melitopol	
Chkalove	rural	Chkalove	Melitopol	
Vilniansk	urban	Vilniansk	Zaporizhzhia	
Matviivka	rural	Matviivka	Zaporizhzhia	
Mykhailivka	rural	Mykhailivka	Zaporizhzhia	
Mykhailo-Lukasheve	rural	Mykhailo-Lukasheve	Zaporizhzhia	
Pavlivske	rural	Pavlivske	Zaporizhzhia	
Petro-Mykhailivka	rural	Petro-Mykhailivka	Zaporizhzhia	
Huliaipole	urban	Huliaipole	Polohy	
Vozdvyzhivka	rural	Vozdvyzhivka	Polohy	
Malynivka	rural	Malynivka	Polohy	
Kushuhum	settlement	Kushuhum	Zaporizhzhia	
Bilenke	rural	Bilenke	Zaporizhzhia	
Dolynske	rural	Dolynske	Zaporizhzhia	
Novooleksandrivka	rural	Novooleksandrivka	Zaporizhzhia	
Stepne	rural	Stepne	Zaporizhzhia	
Shyroke	rural	Shyroke	Zaporizhzhia	
Kamianka-Dniprovska	urban	Kamianka-Dniprovska	Vasylivka	
Blahovishchenka	rural	Blahovishchenka	Vasylivka	
Vodiane	rural	Vodiane	Vasylivka	
Kamianka	settlement	Kamianka	Polohy	
Komysh-Zoria	settlement	Komysh-Zoria	Polohy	
Smyrnove	rural	Smyrnove	Polohy	
Myrne	settlement	Myrne	Melitopol	
Kostiantynivka	rural	Kostiantynivka	Melitopol	
Nove	rural	Nove	Melitopol	
Novobohdanivka	rural	Novobohdanivka	Melitopol	
Semenivka	rural	Semenivka	Melitopol	
Terpinnia	rural	Terpinnia	Melitopol	
Mykhailivka	settlement	Mykhailivka	Vasylivka	
Plodorodne	rural	Plodorodne	Melitopol	
Rozdol	rural	Rozdol	Vasylivka	
Novomykolaivka	settlement	Novomykolaivka	Zaporizhzhia	
Ternuvate	settlement	Ternuvate	Zaporizhzhia	
Orikhiv	urban	Orikhiv	Polohy	
Komyshuvakha	settlement	Komyshuvakha	Zaporizhzhia	
Mala Tokmachka	rural	Mala Tokmachka	Polohy	
Preobrazhenka	rural	Preobrazhenka	Polohy	
Tavriiske	rural	Tavriiske	Zaporizhzhia	
Polohy	urban	Polohy	Polohy	
Voskresenka	rural	Voskresenka	Polohy	
Fedorivka	rural	Fedorivka	Polohy	
Novovasylivka	settlement	Novovasylivka	Melitopol	
Pryazovske	settlement	Pryazovske	Melitopol	
Oleksandrivka	rural	Oleksandrivka	Melitopol	
Prymorsk	urban	Prymorsk	Berdiansk	
Sofiivka	rural	Sofiivka	Berdiansk	
Rozivka	settlement	Rozivka	Polohy	
Molochansk	urban	Molochansk	Polohy	
Chernihivka	settlement	Chernihivka	Berdiansk	

== Zhytomyr Oblast ==
Hromada	Type	Center	Raion	Raion before 2020
Zhytomyr	urban	Zhytomyr	Zhytomyr	
Berdychiv	urban	Berdychiv	Berdychiv	
Korosten	urban	Korosten	Korosten	
Malyn	urban	Malyn	Korosten	
Zviahel	urban	Zviahel	Zviahel	
Andrushivka	urban	Andrushivka	Berdychiv	
Chervone	settlement	Chervone	Berdychiv	
Volytsia	rural	Volytsia	Zhytomyr	
Baranivka	urban	Baranivka	Zviahel	
Dovbysh	settlement	Dovbysh	Zviahel	
Dubrivka	rural	Dubrivka	Zviahel	
Hryshkivtsi	settlement	Hryshkivtsi	Berdychiv	
Raihorodok	rural	Raihorodok	Berdychiv	
Semenivka	rural	Semenivka	Berdychiv	
Shvaikivka	rural	Shvaikivka	Berdychiv	
Brusyliv	settlement	Brusyliv	Zhytomyr	
Irshansk	settlement	Irshansk	Korosten	
Nova Borova	settlement	Nova Borova	Zhytomyr	
Khoroshiv	settlement	Khoroshiv	Zhytomyr	
Myropil	settlement	Myropil	Zhytomyr	
Romaniv	settlement	Romaniv	Zhytomyr	
Yemilchyne	settlement	Yemilchyne	Zviahel	
Barashi	rural	Barashi	Zviahel	
Novohuivynske	settlement	Novohuivynske	Zhytomyr	
Berezivka	rural	Berezivka	Zhytomyr	
Hlybochytsia	rural	Hlybochytsia	Zhytomyr	
Oliivka	rural	Oliivka	Zhytomyr	
Stanyshivka	rural	Stanyshivka	Zhytomyr	
Teterivka	rural	Teterivka	Zhytomyr	
Horshchik	rural	Horshchik	Korosten	
Ushomyr	rural	Ushomyr	Korosten	
Korostyshiv	urban	Korostyshiv	Zhytomyr	
Starosiltsi	rural	Starosiltsi	Zhytomyr	
Kharytonivka	rural	Kharytonivka	Zhytomyr	
Luhyny	settlement	Luhyny	Korosten	
Liubar	settlement	Liubar	Zhytomyr	
Chopovychi	settlement	Chopovychi	Korosten	
Narodychi	settlement	Narodychi	Korosten	
Horodnytsia	settlement	Horodnytsia	Zviahel	
Romanivka	rural	Romanivka	Zviahel	
Pishchiv	rural	Pishchiv	Zviahel	
Stryieva	rural	Stryieva	Zviahel	
Chyzhivka	rural	Chyzhivka	Zviahel	
Yarun	rural	Yarun	Zviahel	
Ovruch	urban	Ovruch	Korosten	
Hladkovychi	rural	Hladkovychi	Korosten	
Slovechne	rural	Slovechne	Korosten	
Olevsk	urban	Olevsk	Korosten	
Bilokorovychi	rural	Bilokorovychi	Korosten	
Kornyn	settlement	Kornyn	Zhytomyr	
Popilnia	settlement	Popilnia	Zhytomyr	
Andrushky	rural	Andrushky	Zhytomyr	
Kvitneve	rural	Kvitneve	Zhytomyr	
Radomyshl	urban	Radomyshl	Zhytomyr	
Horodok	settlement	Horodok	Zhytomyr	
Vyshnevychi	rural	Vyshnevychi	Zhytomyr	
Potiivka	rural	Potiivka	Zhytomyr	
Ruzhyn	settlement	Ruzhyn	Berdychiv	
Vchoraishe	rural	Vchoraishe	Berdychiv	
Pulyny	settlement	Pulyny	Zhytomyr	
Kurne	rural	Kurne	Zhytomyr	
Cherniakhiv	settlement	Cherniakhiv	Zhytomyr	
Vysoke	rural	Vysoke	Zhytomyr	
Chudniv	urban	Chudniv	Zhytomyr	
Vilshanka	rural	Vilshanka	Zhytomyr	
Krasnopil	rural	Krasnopil	Berdychiv	

== See also ==
- List of raions of Ukraine (1966–2020)
