= TOZ =

TOZ may refer to:

== Companies and organizations ==
- Association for Joint Cultivation of Land or TOZ, a form of agricultural cooperative in early Soviet Union (1918–1938)
- TOZ Penkala, a company from Zagreb, Croatia
- TOZ rifle (Tulsky Oruzheyny Zavod), manufactured by Russian Tula Arms Plant, founded by Tsar Peter I of Russia
- Towarzystwo Opieki nad Zwierzętami w Polsce, Association of the Protection of Animals in Poland

== Entertainment ==
- "A Toz", a humorous French novelty rap song by the duo Farid & Oussama featuring Aymane Serhani
- FC Arsenal Tula or TOZ Tula, a Russian football team from Tula, Russia
- Tonhalle-Orchester Zürich, a Swiss symphony orchestra based in Zürich, Switzerland
- Toz (film), a 2005 Turkish short film
