= Andriiashivka, Sumy Oblast =

Village in Sumy Oblast, Ukraine

Andriiashivka Андріяшівка
- Village
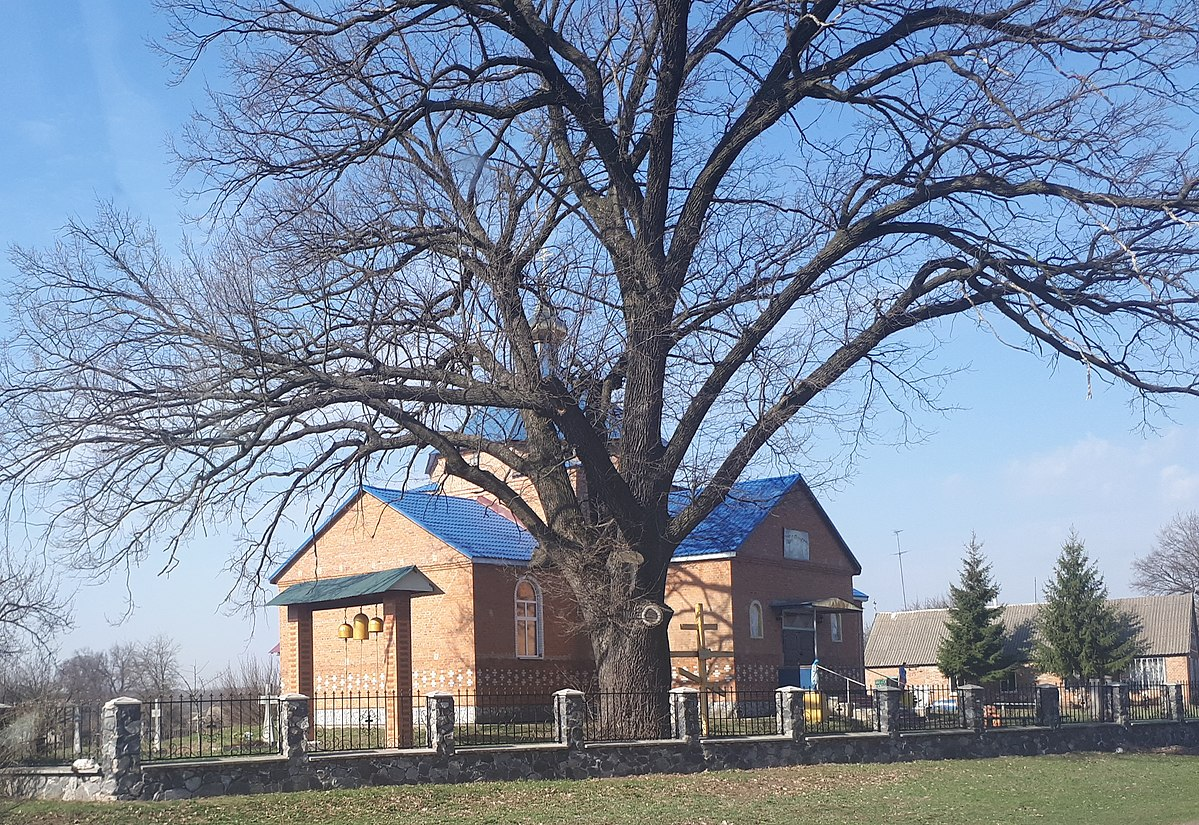
- The Andriiashivka oak and church in Andriiashivka

- Location of Andriiashivka in Sumy Oblast Location of Andriiashivka in Ukraine
- Coordinates: 50°34′15″N 33°22′45″E
- Country: Ukraine
- Oblast: Sumy Oblast
- Raion: Romny Raion
- Hromada: Andriiashivka rural hromada
- First mentioned: 1666

Population
  - Total: 1,352

Andriiashivka (Ukrainian: Андріяшівка; Belarusian: Андрыяшыўка, romanized: Andryjašyŭka; Russian: Андрияшевка, romanized: Andriyashevka) is a village in Romny Raion, in Ukraine's central Sumy Oblast. It is the administrative centre of Andriiashivka rural hromada, one of the hromadas of Ukraine. Its population is 1,352 (as of 2024).

== History ==
Andriiashivka was first mentioned in 1666. Around this time, it was one of the primary centres of the potato farming industry in Ukraine. The village is known for the Andriiashivka oak, a 400-year-old oak tree, which is located near the church.

Andriiashivka came under the control of the Russian Soviet Federative Socialist Republic in January 1918. An Association for Joint Cultivation of Land was established in 1923, followed by an artel named for Rosa Luxemburg the next year. 147 inhabitants of the village died during World War II.

== Demographics ==
According to the 1989 Soviet census Andriiashivka's population was 2,358. By 2001, this number had dropped to 2,087. As of the 2001 census, the majority (97.94%) of Andriiashivka speaks Ukrainian. The remaining population speaks Russian (2.01%) and Belarusian (0.05%).

== Notable people ==
- Pavlo Ivanchenko, Ukrainian ceramicist
- Petro Ivanchenko, Ukrainian porcelain artist
- Nadezhda Leontyeva, Soviet chess composer
- Vasyl Melnyk, Ukrainian pulmonologist
