= Komyshuvakha settlement hromada =

Komyshuvakha settlement hromada Комишуваська селищна громада
- Hromada
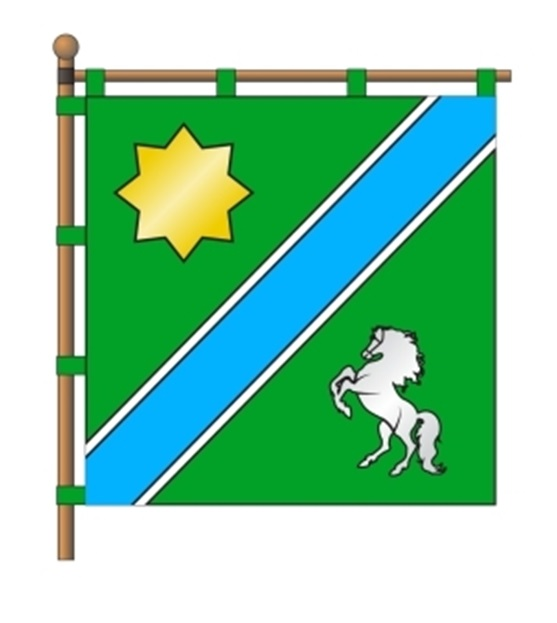
- Interactive map of Komyshuvakha settlement hromada
- Country: Ukraine
- Oblast: Zaporizhzhia Oblast
- Raion: Zaporizhzhia Raion

Area
  - Total: 531.0 km^{2} (205.0 sq mi)

Population (2020)
  - Total: 12,514
  - Density: 23.57/km^{2} (61.04/sq mi)
- Settlements: 30
- Rural settlements: 4
- Villages: 25
- Towns: 1

Komyshuvakha settlement hromada (Ukrainian: Комишуваська селищна громада) is a hromada of Ukraine, located in Zaporizhzhia Raion, Zaporizhzhia Oblast. Its administrative center is the town of Komyshuvakha.

It has an area of 531.0 square kilometres (205.0 mi^{2}) and a population of 12,514, as of 2020.

The hromada includes 30 settlements: 1 town (Komyshuvakha), 25 villages:

- Blakytne
- Vesele
- Vilne
- Hryhorivske
- Druzhne
- Dudnykove
- Zhovta Krucha
- Zhovtenke
- Zapasne
- Kushchove
- Mahdalynivvka
- Novoboikivske
- Novoivanivka
- Novomykhailivka
- Novorozivka
- Novotroitske
- Novoiakovlivka
- Odarivka
- Olenivka
- Slavne
- Tarasivka
- Trudoliubivka
- Trudoolenivka
- Shchaslyve
- Yasna Poliana

And 4 rural-type settlements: Zarichne, Kalynivka, Kyrpotyne, and Novotavrycheske.

== See also ==
- List of hromadas of Ukraine
