= Bochechky =

Village in Sumy Oblast, Ukraine

Bochechky Бочечки
- Village
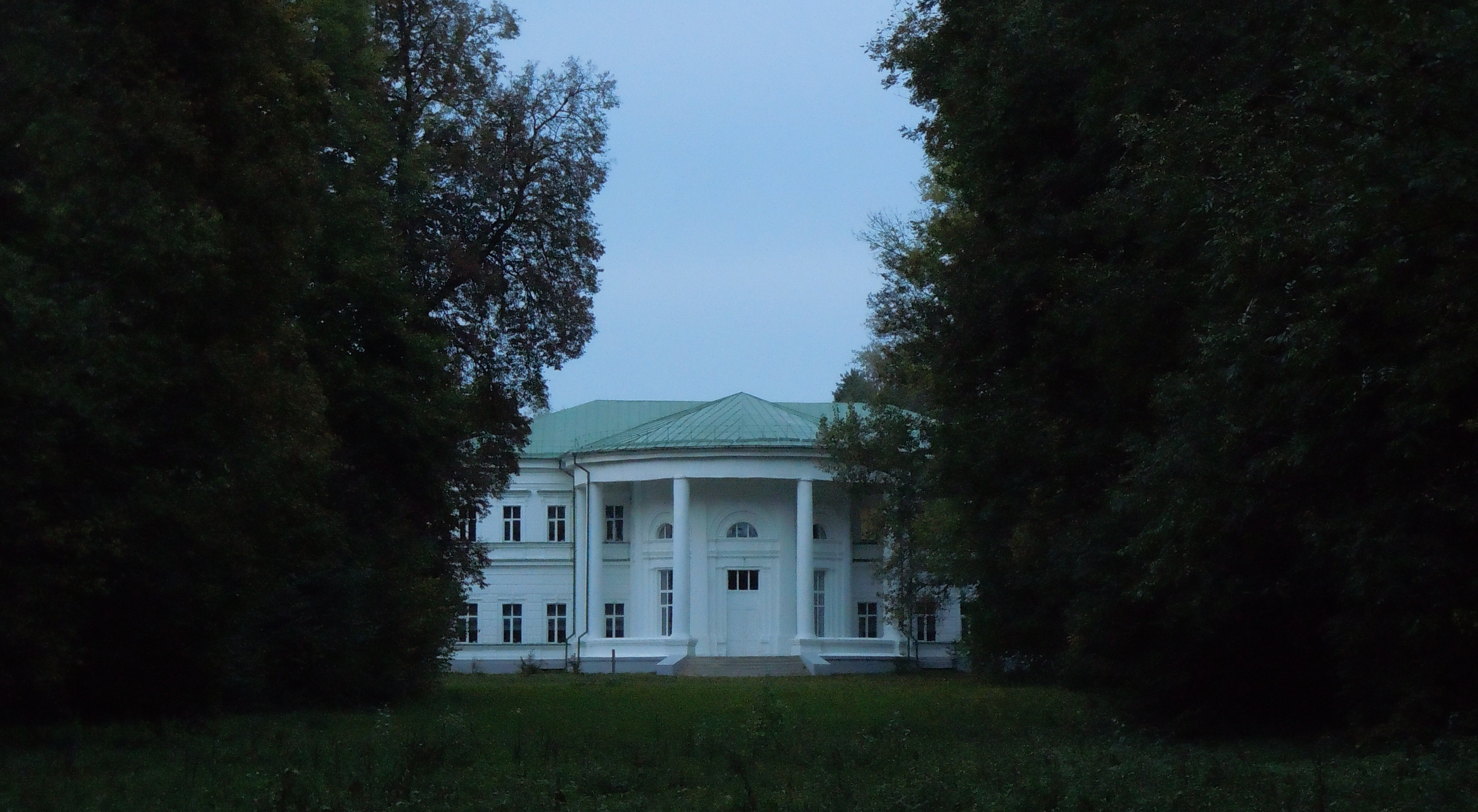
- The palace of the Lvov princely family in Bochechky

- Location of Bochechky in Sumy Oblast Location of Bochechky in Ukraine
- Coordinates: 51°18′00″N 33°24′39″E
- Country: Ukraine
- Oblast: Sumy Oblast
- Raion: Konotop Raion
- Hromada: Bochechky rural hromada
- First mentioned: 1659

Population
  - Total: 1,679

Bochechky (Ukrainian: Бочечки) is a village in Konotop Raion, Sumy Oblast, Ukraine. It is the administrative centre of the Bochechky rural hromada, one of the hromadas of Ukraine. Its population is 1,679 (as of 2023).

== History ==
Bochechky was first mentioned in 1659. Prior to the Emancipation reform of 1861 the majority of villagers were serfs under the Byrdyn, Lvov, or Yazuchevskyi families. The Lvov family historically owned an 18th-century palace.

Following the establishment of the Ukrainian Soviet Socialist Republic, two kolkhozes were established in Bochechky. Two more were established between 1930 and 1931, as was a theatre and a library. 850 residents of the village died during World War II.

== Notable people ==
- Anatolii Davydov, Ukrainian writer.
- Lidia Kovalenko, Ukrainian journalist and historian of the Holodomor.
- Pavlo Mokrous, Ukrainian engineer and bibliographer
- Pavlo Prykhodchenko, Ukrainian Soviet politician
