= Andrivka rural hromada =

Andrivka rural hromada Андрівська селищна громада
- Hromada
- Interactive map of Andrivka rural hromada
- Country: Ukraine
- Oblast: Zaporizhzhia Oblast
- Raion: Berdiansk Raion

Area
  - Total: 194.8 km^{2} (75.2 sq mi)

Population (2020)
  - Total: 3,257
  - Density: 16.72/km^{2} (43.30/sq mi)
- Settlements: 4
- Villages: 4

Andrivka rural hromada (Ukrainian: Андрівська селищна громада) is a hromada of Ukraine, located in Berdiansk Raion, Zaporizhzhia Oblast. Its administrative center is the village of Andrivka.

It has an area of 194.8 square kilometres (75.2 mi^{2}) and a population of 3,257, as of 2020.

The hromada contains 4 settlements, which are all villages:

- Andrivka
- Novotroitske
- Polouzivka
- Troiany

== See also ==
- List of hromadas of Ukraine
