= Pavlivske rural hromada =

Pavlivske rural hromada Павлівська селищна громада
- Hromada
- Interactive map of Pavlivske rural hromada
- Country: Ukraine
- Oblast: Zaporizhzhia Oblast
- Raion: Zaporizhzhia Raion

Area
  - Total: 169.8 km^{2} (65.6 sq mi)

Population (2020)
  - Total: 4,629
  - Density: 27.26/km^{2} (70.61/sq mi)
- Settlements: 21
- Villages: 21

Pavlivske rural hromada (Ukrainian: Павлівська селищна громада) is a hromada of Ukraine, located in Zaporizhzhia Raion, Zaporizhzhia Oblast. Its administrative center is the village of Pavlivske.

It has an area of 169.8 square kilometres (65.6 mi^{2}) and a population of 4,629, as of 2020.

The hromada contains 21 settlements, which are all villages:

- Berestove
- Biliaivka
- Vasylivka
- Vyshneve
- Vivcharne
- Zadorozhnie
- Zelene
- Znachkove
- Liubomyrivka
- Novovasylivka
- Novoselevka
- Novoukrainka
- Pavlivske
- Pershozvanivka
- Pody
- Rezedivka
- Rozdollia
- Semenenkove
- Solone
- Spasivka
- Shevchenkove

== See also ==
- List of hromadas of Ukraine
