= Komyshi =

Village in Sumy Oblast, Ukraine

Komyshi Комиші
- Village
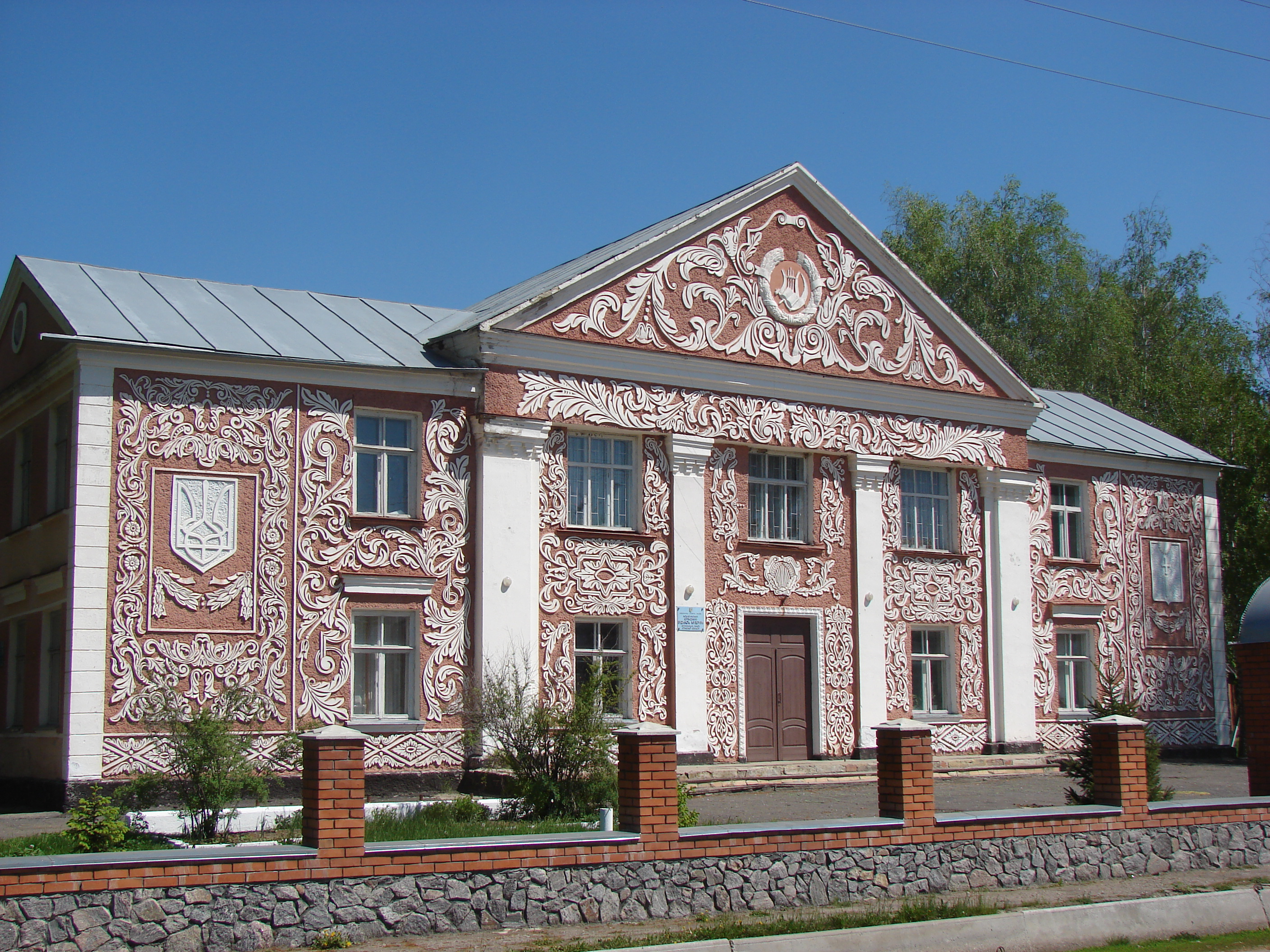
- The Palace of Culture in Komyshi

- Location of Komyshi in Sumy Oblast Location of Komyshi in Ukraine
- Coordinates: 50°18′36″N 34°28′35″E
- Country: Ukraine
- Oblast: Sumy Oblast
- Raion: Okhtyrka Raion
- Hromada: Komyshi rural hromada
- First mentioned: 17th century

Population
  - Total: 1,225

Komyshi (Ukrainian: Комиші; Russian: Камыши, romanized: Kamyshi) is a village in Okhtyrka Raion, in Ukraine's central Sumy Oblast. It is the administrative centre of Komyshi rural hromada, one of the hromadas of Ukraine. Its population is 1,225 (as of 2024).

== History ==
Komyshi was first mentioned sometime in the 17th century. It was occupied by the Russian Soviet Federative Socialist Republic in December 1917, after which a kolkhoz named "Ilyich's Testament" was established in the village. 166 inhabitants of Komyshi were killed in World War II, and a monument to Soviet soldiers killed in the war was constructed in 1958.

Komyshi's economy is primarily driven by the local farm, which has leveraged its economic output to improve local living standards since the 1990s.
