= Novooleksandrivka rural hromada =

Novooleksandrivka rural hromada Новоолександрівська селищна громада
- Hromada
- Interactive map of Novooleksandrivka rural hromada
- Country: Ukraine
- Oblast: Zaporizhzhia Oblast
- Raion: Zaporizhzhia Raion

Area
  - Total: 142.8 km^{2} (55.1 sq mi)

Population (2020)
  - Total: 4,860
  - Density: 34.0/km^{2} (88.1/sq mi)
- Settlements: 7
- Rural settlements: 1
- Villages: 6

Novooleksandrivka rural hromada (Ukrainian: Новоолександрівська селищна громада) is a hromada of Ukraine, located in Zaporizhzhia Raion, Zaporizhzhia Oblast. Its administrative center is the village of Novooleksandrivka.

It has an area of 142.8 square kilometres (55.1 mi^{2}) and a population of 4,860, as of 2020.

The hromada contains 7 settlements, including 6 villages:

- Veselianka
- Hryhorivka
- Zaporozhets
- Novooleksandrivka
- Novoolenivka
- Yulivka

And 1 rural-type settlement: Richne.

== See also ==
- List of hromadas of Ukraine
