= Andriivka settlement hromada =

Andriivka settlement hromada Андріївська селищна громада
- Hromada
- Interactive map of Andriivka settlement hromada
- Country: Ukraine
- Oblast: Zaporizhzhia Oblast
- Raion: Berdiansk Raion

Area
  - Total: 498.7 km^{2} (192.5 sq mi)

Population (2020)
  - Total: 7,001
  - Density: 14.04/km^{2} (36.36/sq mi)
- Settlements: 14
- Villages: 13
- Towns: 1

Andriivka settlement hromada (Ukrainian: Андріївська селищна громада) is a hromada of Ukraine, located in Berdiansk Raion, Zaporizhzhia Oblast. Its administrative center is the town of Andriivka.

It has an area of 498.7 square kilometres (192.5 mi^{2}) and a population of 7,001, as of 2020.

The hromada includes 14 settlements: 1 town (Andriivka) and 13 villages:

- Dakhno
- Dmytrivka
- Dolynske
- Ivanivka
- Koza
- Krymka
- Novosilske
- Olenivka
- Sakhno
- Sofiivka
- Uspenivka
- Shevchenka
- Shevchenkove

== See also ==
- List of hromadas of Ukraine
