= Mykhailo-Lukasheve rural hromada =

Mykhailo-Lukasheve rural hromada Михайло-Лукашівська селищна громада
- Hromada
- Interactive map of Mykhailo-Lukasheve rural hromada
- Country: Ukraine
- Oblast: Zaporizhzhia Oblast
- Raion: Zaporizhzhia Raion

Area
  - Total: 368.0 km^{2} (142.1 sq mi)

Population (2020)
  - Total: 5,447
  - Density: 14.80/km^{2} (38.34/sq mi)
- Settlements: 26
- Villages: 26

Mykhailo-Lukasheve rural hromada (Ukrainian: Михайло-Лукашівська селищна громада) is a hromada of Ukraine, located in Zaporizhzhia Raion, Zaporizhzhia Oblast. Its administrative center is the village of Mykhailo-Lukasheve.

It has an area of 368.0 square kilometres (142.1 mi^{2}) and a population of 5,447, as of 2020.

The hromada contains 26 settlements, which are all villages:

- Antonivka
- Blahovishchenske
- Bohdanivka
- Vasylkivske
- Veselivske
- Volodymyrivka
- Helendzhyk
- Zelenyi Hai
- Kozache
- Kolos
- Krutyi Yar
- Maksymivka
- Mykilske
- Myroliubivka
- Mykhailo-Lukasheve
- Moskovka
- Novovasylivske
- Novomyrhorodka
- Novomykhailivske
- Novofedorivka
- Pryvilne
- Raiske
- Tersianka
- Trudoliubivka
- Ukromne
- Shyroke

== See also ==
- List of hromadas of Ukraine
