= Novomykolaivka settlement hromada =

Novomykolaivka settlement hromada Новомиколаївська селищна громада
- Hromada
- Interactive map of Novomykolaivka settlement hromada
- Country: Ukraine
- Oblast: Zaporizhzhia Oblast
- Raion: Zaporizhzhia Raion

Area
  - Total: 659.3 km^{2} (254.6 sq mi)

Population (2020)
  - Total: 11,208
  - Density: 17.00/km^{2} (44.03/sq mi)
- Settlements: 54
- Rural settlements: 1
- Villages: 52
- Towns: 1

Novomykolaivka settlement hromada (Ukrainian: Новомиколаївська селищна громада) is a hromada of Ukraine, located in Zaporizhzhia Raion, Zaporizhzhia Oblast. Its administrative center is the town of Novomykolaivka.

It has an area of 659.3 square kilometres (254.6 mi^{2}) and a population of 11,208, as of 2020.

The hromada includes 54 settlements: 1 town (Novomykolaivka), 52 villages:

- Berestove
- Blahodatne
- Bohdanivka
- Bohunivka
- Veselyi Hai
- Viktorivka
- Vilne
- Voskresenka
- Holubkove
- Horlytske
- Hranychne
- Dubovyi Hai
- Dudnykove
- Zalyvne
- Zelena Dibrova
- Zelene
- Ivanivske
- Kamianka
- Kamianuvate
- Kashtanivka
- Kyivske
- Krynivka
- Lystivka
- Marianivka
- Mykolaivka Druha
- Mykolai-Pole
- Mykhailivske
- Nizhenka
- Nove Pole
- Novoviktorivka
- Novovolodymyrivka
- Novohryhorivka
- Novoivankivka
- Novokasianivka
- Novosolone
- Novoukrainka
- Oleksiivka
- Ostrovske
- Petropavlivka
- Petropavlivske
- Pidhirne
- Rybalske
- Rodynske
- Rozivka
- Sadove
- Serhiivka
- Sorochyne
- Sofiivka
- Storchove
- Ternivka
- Tersianka
- Shevchenkivske

And 1 rural-type settlement: Trudove.

== See also ==
- List of hromadas of Ukraine
