= Synivka =

Village in Sumy Oblast, Ukraine

Synivka Синівка
- Village
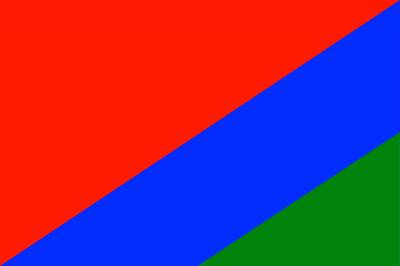
- Flag

- Location of Synivka in Sumy Oblast Location of Synivka in Ukraine
- Coordinates: 50°32′22″N 34°05′34″E
- Country: Ukraine
- Oblast: Sumy Oblast
- Raion: Romny Raion
- Hromada: Synivka rural hromada
- First mentioned: 1669

Population
  - Total: 1,267

Synivka (Ukrainian: Синівка) is a village in Romny Raion, Sumy Oblast, Ukraine. It is the administrative centre of Synivka rural hromada, one of the hromadas of Ukraine. Its population is 1,267 (as of 2024).

== History ==
Synivka was first mentioned in 1669. According to local legend, its name derives from the phrase "Land of the Sons of Veletskyi" (Ukrainian: Земля синів Велецького, romanized: Zemlia syniv Veletskoho), after a noble family which had been given ownership of the village by Hetman of the Zaporizhian Host Ivan Skoropadsky.

Synivka was taken over by the Russian Soviet Federative Socialist Republic in January 1918, and a kolkhoz named after Vladimir Lenin was established in the village afterwards. During World War II two partisan groups were established, including a group of Komsomol members led by M. Artiukh, which was responsible for killing 20 German soldiers and officers. A total of 165 residents were killed during the war.

Prior to the 2020 administrative division reform in Ukraine, Synivka was part of Lypova Dolyna Raion.

A series of protests occurred in the village in 2020, in opposition to the plowing of fields. The protesters cited livestock grazing as a reason for their opposition to the plowing.

== Notable people ==
- Ivan Dakhno, Ukrainian economics professor.
