= Zabrody, Kovel Raion, Volyn Oblast =

Zabrody Заброди
- Village
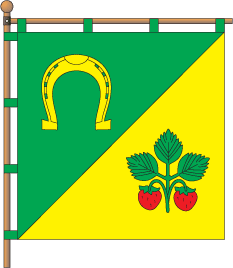
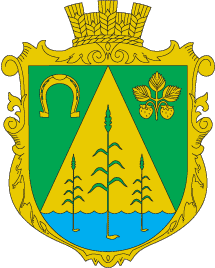
- Flag Coat of arms

- Location of Zabrody in Volyn Oblast Location of Zabrody in Ukraine
- Coordinates: 51°40′03″N 24°36′09″E
- Country: Ukraine
- Oblast: Volyn Oblast
- Raion: Kovel Raion
- Hromada: Zabrody rural hromada
- Founded: 1600

Area
  - Total: 2.16 km^{2} (0.83 sq mi)
- Elevation: 154 m (505 ft)

Population (2001)
  - Total: 853
  - Density: 395/km^{2} (1,020/sq mi)
- Time zone: UTC+2 (EET)
  - Summer (DST): UTC+3 (EEST)
- Postal code: 44160
- Area code: +380 3366

Zabrody (Ukrainian: Заброди) is a village in northwestern Ukraine, in Kovel Raion of Volyn Oblast, but was formerly administered within Ratne Raion. In 2001, the community had 853 residents. Postal code — 44160. KOATUU code — 724283401.
