= Neresnytsia =

Village in Zakarpattia Oblast, Ukraine

Neresnytsia Нересниця Nyéresháza (Hungarian)
- Village
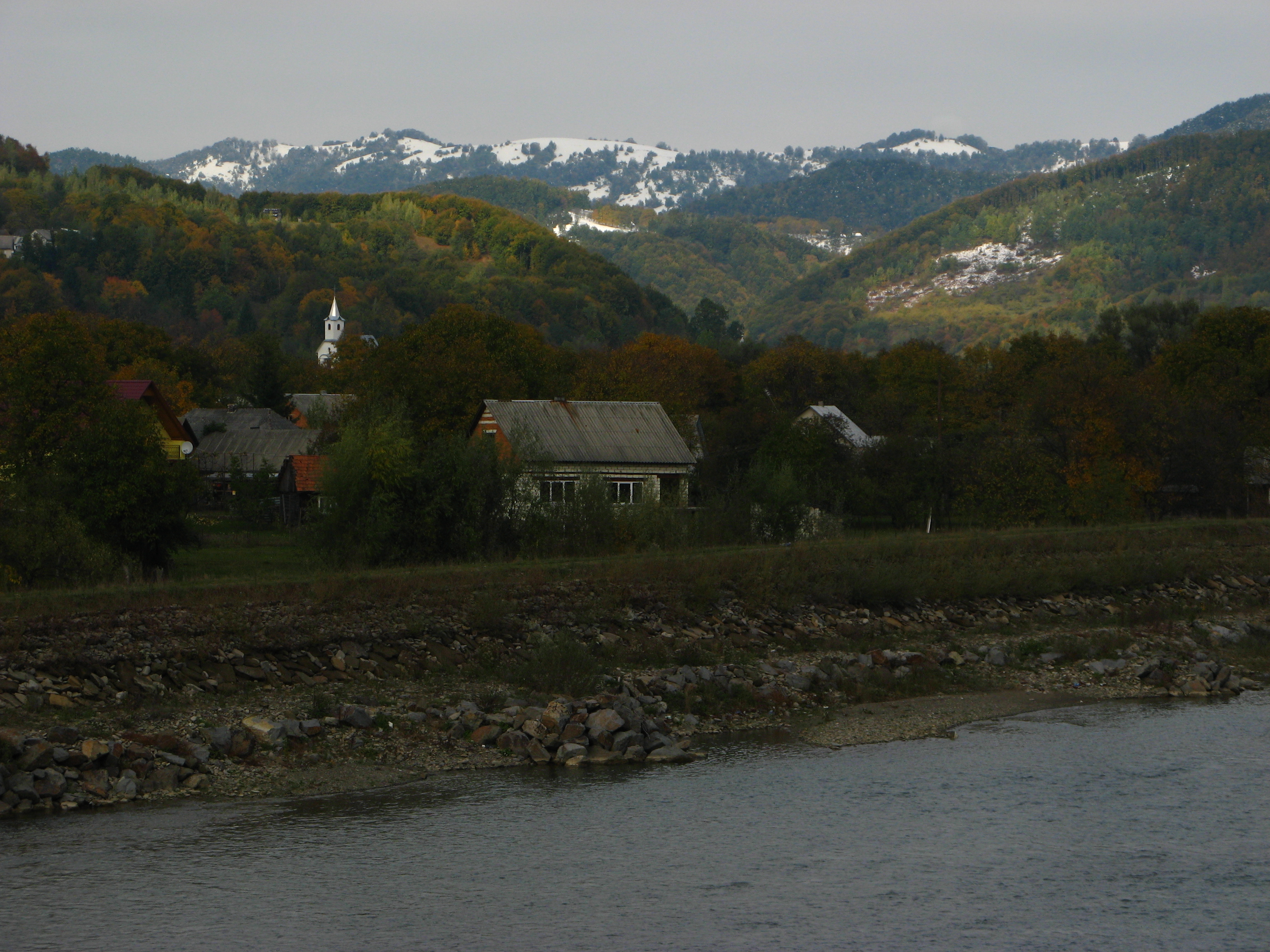

- Location of Neresnytsia in Zakarpattia Oblast Location of Neresnytsia in Ukraine
- Coordinates: 48°07′02″N 23°46′09″E
- Country: Ukraine
- Oblast: Zakarpattia Oblast
- Raion: Tiachiv Raion
- First mentioned: 1411

Population (2025)
  - Total: 3,732

Neresnytsia (Ukrainian: Нересниця; Hungarian: Nyéresháza) is a village in Tiachiv Raion, Zakarpattia Oblast, Ukraine. It is the administrative centre of Neresnytsia rural hromada, one of the hromadas of Ukraine. Its population is 3,732 (as of 2025).

== Overview ==
Neresnytsia was first mentioned in writing in 1411, though archaeological finds indicate that it has been inhabited since the Bronze Age. The primary industry in the village has been salt extraction since the mid-19th century, with salt being ferried down the Tisza before being distributed. An oak plantation also exists in the village. Neresnytsia was historically ruled by the Piarists, a Catholic religious order.

In the present day, ecotourism has provided further growth to the local economy. A cave system with a total length of between 200 and 700 metres is located near Neresnytsia, as are two salt lakes, which are the source of the salt industry. Local legend claims that one of the lakes was formed by the collapse of a church and salt mine, and that church bells can be heard from the lake at night.
