= Prylisne rural hromada =

Rural hromada of Volyn Oblast, Ukraine

Prylisne rural hromada Прилісненська громада
- Hromada
- Interactive map of Prylisne rural hromada
- Country: Ukraine
- Oblast: Volyn
- Raion: Kamin-Kashyrskyi

Area
  - Total: 526.7 km^{2} (203.4 sq mi)

Population
  - Total: 8,896
  - Density: 16.89/km^{2} (43.75/sq mi)
- Settlements: 11
- Villages: 11
- Website: https://prylisnenska-gromada.gov.ua/

Prylisne rural territorial hromada is one of the hromadas of Ukraine, located in Kamin-Kashyrskyi Raion in Volyn Oblast. Its administrative centre is the village of Prylisne.

== Composition ==
The hromada contains 19 villages:

- Haluziya
- Horodok
- Karasyn
- Lyshnivka
- Novi Chervyshcha
- Prylisne (administrative centre)
- Rudka-Chervynska
- Serkhiv
- Stari Chervyshcha
- Toboly
- Zamostia

== International partnerships ==
- (Poland) Nielisz
