= Zhytomyr urban hromada =

Urban hromada of Zhytomyr Oblast, Ukraine

Zhytomyr urban hromada Житомирська міська громада
- Hromada
- Coat of arms

- Location within Zhytomyr Oblast Location within Ukraine
- Coordinates: 50°15′0″N 28°40′0″E
- Country: Ukraine
- Oblast: Zhytomyr
- Raion: Zhytomyr
- Established: 28 June 2018

Area
  - Total: 91.5 km^{2} (35.3 sq mi)

Population (2023)
  - Total: 275,412
- Website: zt-rada.gov.ua

Zhytomyr urban territorial hromada (Ukrainian: Житомирська міська територіальна громада, romanized: Zhytomyrska miska terytorialna hromada) is one of Ukraine's hromadas, located in Zhytomyr Raion in Zhytomyr Oblast. Its capital is the city of Zhytomyr.

The hromada has an area of 91.5 km^{2} (35.3 mi^{2}), as well as a population of 275,412 (as of 2023). It was first established as an amalgamated hromada on 28 June 2018, before being expanded to its current size as part of decentralisation in Ukraine.

== Composition ==
In addition to one city (Zhytomyr), the hromada contains a single village: Veresy.
