= Samary rural hromada =

Rural hromada of Volyn Oblast, Ukraine

Samary rural hromada Самарівська громада
- Hromada
- Interactive map of Samary rural hromada
- Country: Ukraine
- Oblast: Volyn
- Raion: Kovel

Area
  - Total: 256.8 km^{2} (99.2 sq mi)

Population
  - Total: 5,460
  - Density: 21.3/km^{2} (55.1/sq mi)
- Settlements: 19
- Villages: 19
- Website: https://samary-otg.gov.ua/

Samary rural territorial hromada is one of the hromadas of Ukraine, located in Kovel Raion in Volyn Oblast. Its administrative centre is the village of Samary.

== Composition ==
The hromada contains 19 villages:

- Bereznyky
- Borovukha
- Brodiatyne
- Holovyshche
- Khabaryshche
- Kozovata
- Male Orikhove
- Mezhysyt
- Pochapy
- Pidyazivni
- Samary (administrative centre)
- Samary-Orikhovi
- Shchytynska Volia
- Terebovychi
- Yazavni
- Zalysytsia
- Zalukhiv
- Zanyvske
- Zaprypiat
