= Povorsk =

Povorsk Поворськ
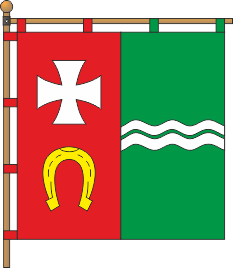
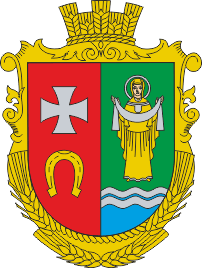
- Flag Coat of arms

- Country: Ukraine
- Oblast: Volyn Oblast
- Raion: Kovel Raion
- Hromada: Povorsk rural hromada

Area
  - Total: 6.335 km^{2} (2.446 sq mi)
- Elevation: 169 m (554 ft)

Population (2001)
  - Total: 1,875
  - Density: 295.97/km^{2} (766.6/sq mi)
- Postal code: 45050
- Area code: +380 3352

Povorsk (Ukrainian: Поворськ) is a village in Volhyna region in Ukraine, in Kovel Raion of Volyn Oblast. The town is 25 kilometers east of Kovel. It has a population of 1875.

== History ==
On June 26, 1941, the German army occupied the village. From August to September 1942, Jews of the village were kept in a ghetto. In September 1942, an Einsatzgruppen murdered 200 Jews in a mass execution.
