= Volodymyr urban hromada =

Urban hromada in Volyn Oblast, Ukraine

Volodymyr urban hromada Володимирська міська громада
- Hromada
- Seal
- Interactive map of Volodymyr urban hromada
- Country: Ukraine
- Oblast: Volyn Oblast
- Raion: Volodymyr Raion
- Admin. center: Volodymyr

Area
  - Total: 104.2 km^{2} (40.2 sq mi)

Population (2023)
  - Total: 43,779
  - Density: 420.1/km^{2} (1,088/sq mi)
- CATOTTG code: UA07020010000096841
- Settlements: 9
- Cities: 1
- Villages: 8
- Website: volodymyrrada.gov.ua

Volodymyr urban territorial hromada (Ukrainian: Володимирська міська територіальна громада, romanized: Volodymyrska miska terytorialna hromada) is a hromada of Ukraine, located in Volodymyr Raion in the western Volyn Oblast. Its administrative centre is the city of Volodymyr. On 1 December 2025, the Cabinet of Ministers renamed the hromada from Volodymyr-Volynskyi to Volodymyr in line with the city's renaming in 2021.

The hromada has a size of 104.2 km^{2} (40.2 mi^{2}), as well as a population of 43,779 (as of 2023).

== Composition ==
In addition to one city (Volodymyr), the hromada includes eight villages:

- Dihtiv
- Fedorivka
- Laskiv
- Novosilky
- Orani
- Sukhodoly
- Voshchatyn
- Zarichchia

== Starosta okruhs ==
- Laskiv (Laskiv, Voshchatyn)
- Zarichchia (Dihtiv, Fedorivka, Novosilky, Orani, Sukhodoly, Zarichchia)
