= Soshychne rural hromada =

Rural hromada of Volyn Oblast, Ukraine

Soshychne rural hromada Сошичненська громада
- Hromada
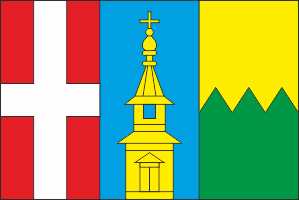
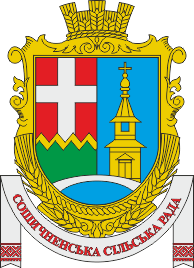
- Flag Seal
- Interactive map of Soshychne rural hromada
- Country: Ukraine
- Oblast: Volyn
- Raion: Kamin-Kashyrskyi
- Established: 2019

Area
  - Total: 158.25 km^{2} (61.10 sq mi)

Population
  - Total: 9,558
  - Density: 60.40/km^{2} (156.4/sq mi)
- Settlements: 7
- Villages: 7

Soshychne rural territorial hromada is one of the hromadas of Ukraine, located in Kamin-Kashyrskyi Raion in Volyn Oblast. Its administrative centre is the village of Soshychne.

== Composition ==
The hromada contains 7 villages:

- Kachyn
- Karasyn
- Lychyny
- Nuino
- Soshychne (administrative centre)
- Stobykhivka
- Zalissia
