= Association for Joint Cultivation of Land =

Type of agricultural cooperative in the early Soviet Union

An Association for Joint Cultivation of Land (Russian: Товарищество по совместной обработке земли, ТОЗ), TOZ, was a form of Agricultural cooperative in early Soviet Union (1918–1938).

== See also ==
- Kolkhoz
- Sovkhoz
