= Kosivka, Odesa Oblast =

Rural locality in Odesa Oblast, Ukraine

Kosivka Косівка
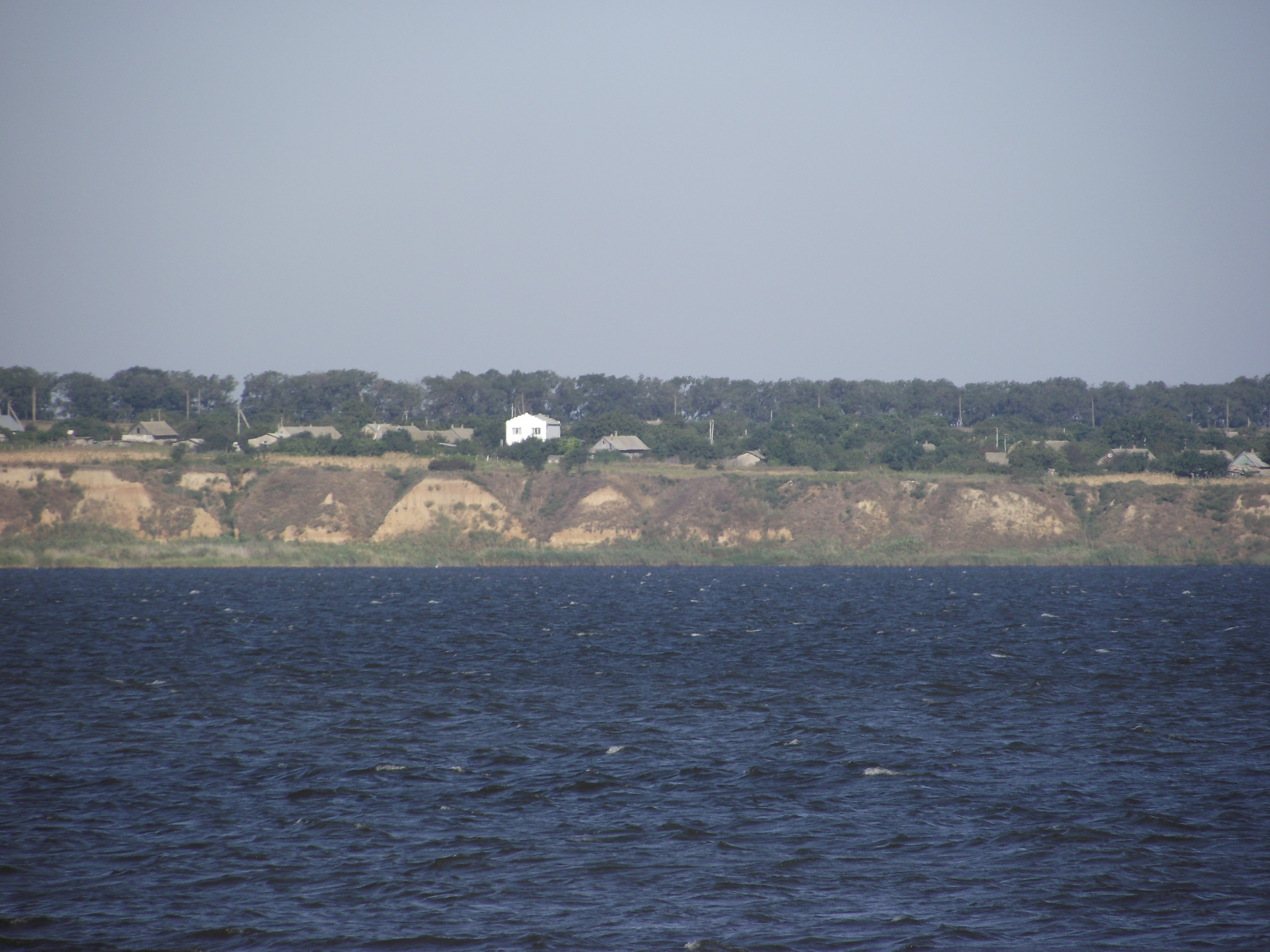
- Kosivka view

- Location within Odesa Oblast Location within Ukraine
- Coordinates: 45°59′54″N 30°19′17″E
- Country: Ukraine
- Oblast: Odesa Oblast
- Raion: Bilhorod-Dnistrovskyi Raion
- Hromada: Serhiivka settlement hromada
- Time zone: UTC+2 (EET (Kyiv))
  - Summer (DST): UTC+3 (EEST)

Kosivka (Ukrainian: Косівка, Russian: Косовка) is a village in Ukraine of Bilhorod-Dnistrovskyi Raion (sub-region) of Odesa Oblast (region). It belongs to Serhiivka settlement hromada, one of the hromadas of Ukraine. The population of the village is 258 people.

== Geography ==
Kosivka is a typical Bessarabian village with people of Ukrainian majority. Before the World War II, 80% of people were Ukrainians and 20% are Russians. After the War, many Moldavians settled in Kosivka. They worked in Serhiivka, Serhiivka settlement hromada, Bilhorod-Dnistrovskyi Raion, Odesa Oblast, mainly in construction works and later in sanatoriums. During Soviet Period, Moldavian Soviet Government financed the building of sanatoriums and big houses of Serhiivka. Today many sanatoriums still belong to or are connected to the Ministry of Health of Moldova. Today many people of Kosivka continue to work in sanatoriums of Serhiivka. Markets of Serhiivka are supplied by vegetables, fruits, milk products of nearest villages, including Kosivka. People of the village have many goats and unfortunately few cows only. During the Soviet Period, two farms were built in Kosivka. One of the farms works now. Most of the village's houses were built before World War II. Only several houses were built in the 20th century. The main material for the construction of houses was clay. But the new houses of the 20th century were made of modern materials.

The village has a very important situation. The village is situated close by the coastal salt lake Budak (or Shabolat) and the Black Sea. Mud and salt water of the lake are healing and used for therapeutic mud-baths. To get to the Black Sea from the village is possible by a motor boat or by land transport via Serhiivka or Kurortne. There are no entertainment centers at the village. The sole shop does not sell alcohol. It is not typical for local tourist destinations.

== Language ==
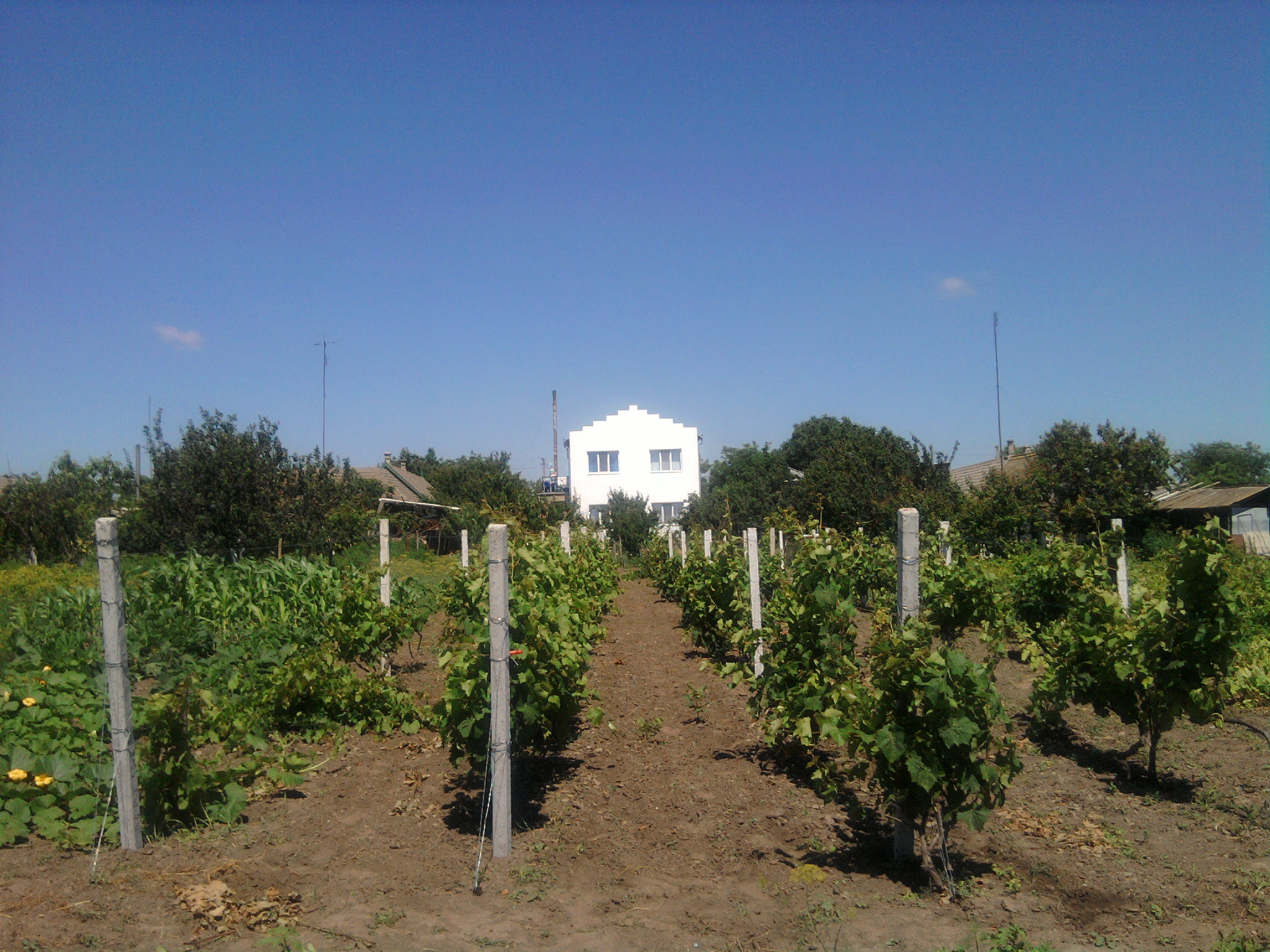
Kosivka vineyard

Local people speak Bessarabian dialect of Ukrainian, where are many Romanian and Russian words. Also many people speak Russian and minority speaks Moldavian. Old generation of people of Kosivka speaks Romanian because Kosivka was a part of Romania until 1940. New generation speaks both Ukrainian and Russian languages.

== History ==
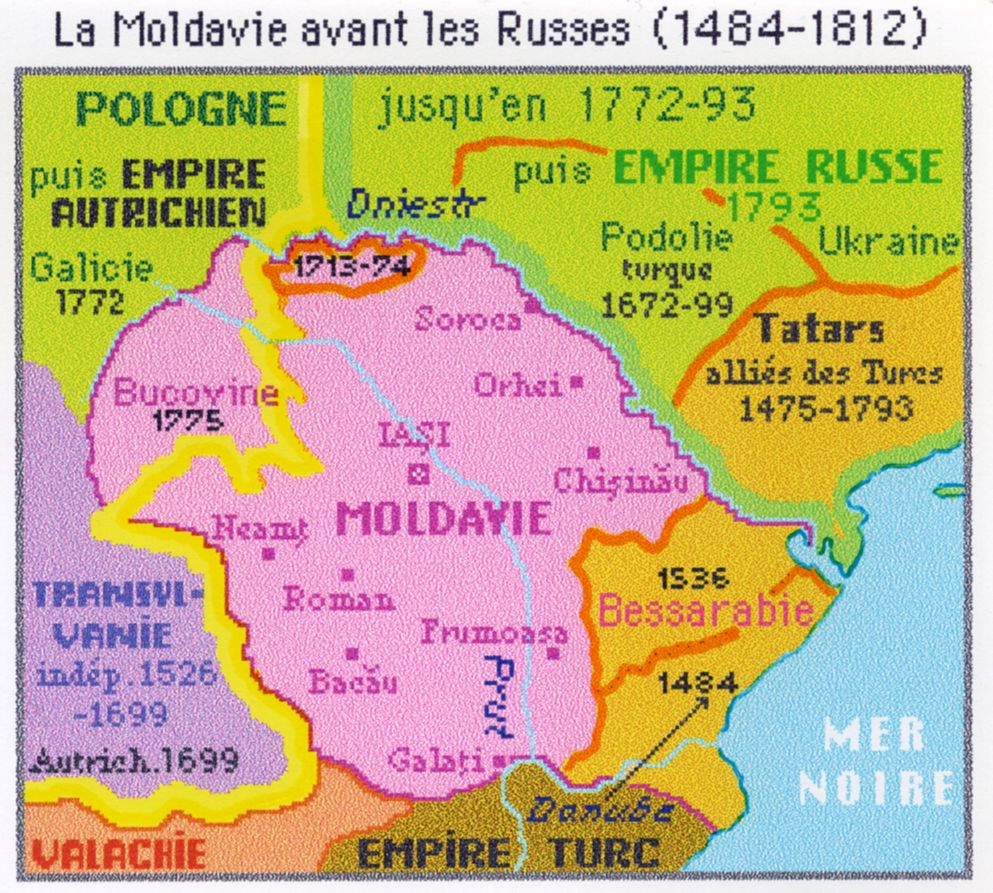
Moldavia between 1484 and 1812

=== Tatar period (15th-19th centuries) ===
The village was founded in the 15th century by Tatars. It was the Budgak Horde with the main city - Ak-Kerman (White Fortress). There are old Tatar's monuments at the village's cemetery.

=== Russian Empire period (1812–1918) ===
In 1812 the territory of Bessarabia was attached to the Russian Empire. Tatars were evicted to Russia.

=== Romanian period (1918–1940) ===
In 1918 Romanian Army occupied Bessarabia and Bessarabian Parliament decided on 25 November 1918 to be a part of Romania. Kosivka was a Romanian village till 1940. The Romanian name of the village was Codăeşti (Kadayeshty).

=== Second World War period (1940–1944) ===
In 1940 Bessarabia was occupied by USSR. Kosivka as a part of Akkerman "povit" (region) became a part of Ukraine. During World War II from 19 July 1941 to 25 August 1944 the village was occupied by Romania.

=== Soviet period (1944–1991) ===
In 1944 Kosivka was occupied by the Soviet Army. In 1954 the village became a part of Odesa Oblast of Soviet Ukraine.

=== Ukrainian period (Since 1991) ===
After independence of Ukraine from the Soviet Union on 24 August 1991, Kosivka became a part of Odesa Oblast of Ukraine. Therefore, Ukrainian history of Kosivka, including World War II and Soviet Ukraine, begins in 1940 only. Kosivka never was a part of Ukraine before.

== Religion ==
=== Baptist church ===
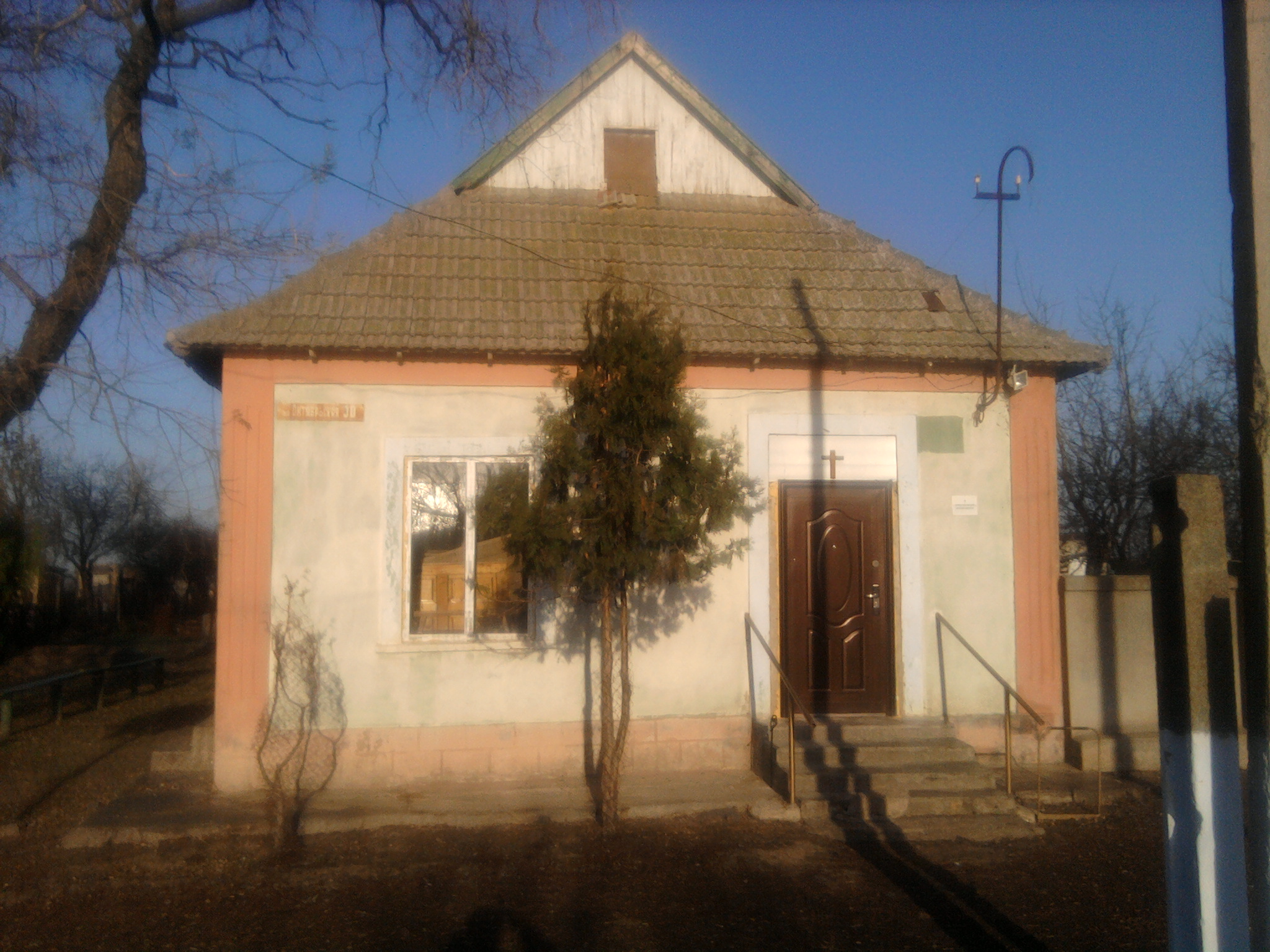
Kosivka Baptist Church

The Kosivka Baptist Church was built in 1931. After the Soviet occupation the church building was transformed to a stable and later to a village club. After independence of Ukraine, the church building was returned to Baptists by the President's Act.

The Baptist Church is a part of Evangelical Baptist Union of Ukraine (aka All-Ukrainian Union of Churches of Evangelical Christian Baptists; Ukrainian: Всеукраїнський союз церков євангельських християн-баптистів) is a union of Baptists in Ukraine. It is the largest protestant union in Ukraine. According to the union, it is composed by over 2,800 churches and groups, with 150,000 conscious believers, and about 300,000 people that attend church services.

The Kosivka Baptist Church has about 25 members. It is about 10% of the village population. The Church had and has now a big influence on the village's life. No alcohol is for sale at the village's sole shop. No criminal activity is recorded at the village. The Christian Club for children "Future of Ukraine" was founded on base of the Church. Children of the village are involved in the Church activity.

== School ==
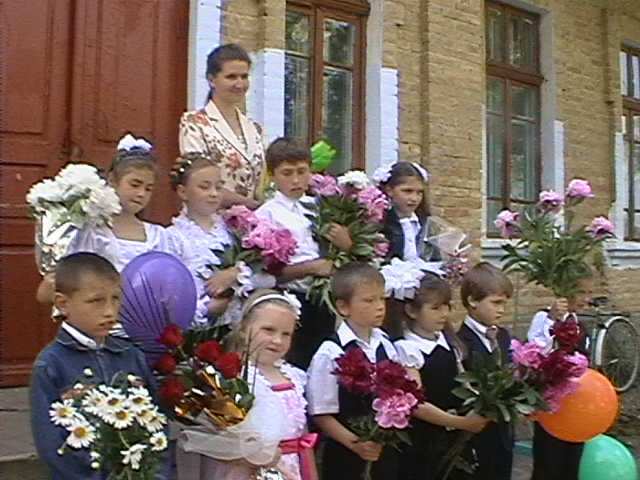
Kosivka School

Kosivka School is situated on the main street of the village 1, Zhovtneva Street, Kosivka, 67792.

The school building was built in 1917. However the building is in good condition. The local authorities has financed repairing of the building for the past years.

The school building also hosts a medical office and the village's library. The library has a large collection of books. Many books were granted by the Kosivka Baptist Church.

Children of the school attend 1st, 2nd and 3rd classes only. All other children of 4th class and higher attend the school at Primorske, 5 kilometers from Kosivka. The children are transported to and from the Primorske School by a school bus.

The school has a small number of children but quality of education is high. Children love the school very much. Children study English on the second year (2nd class).

== Transport and Communication ==
Kosivka is connected to Bilhorod-Dnistrovskyi, Shabo, Serhiivka and other towns and villages by the bus service "Bilhorod-Dnistrovskyi - Popazdra".

Kosivka may be reached by three ways:

- From Bilhorod-Dnistrovskyi to Kosivka by a bus "Bilhorod-Dnistrovskyi - Popazdra";
- From Odesa to Serhiivka by a bus "Odesa - Serhiivka" and from Serhiivka to Kosivka by a taxi or bus "Bilhorod-Dnistrovskyi - Popazdra";
- From Odesa to Kosivka by a bus "Odesa - Tatarbunary". The bus does not go through Kosivka but one kilometer by-pass.

Communication of the village is based mainly on mobile phones (GSM) and mobile internet (CDMA). The main mobile phone provider is "Kyivstar". Other mobile phone providers (MTS, Life and others) have poor coverage in the village. The main mobile internet provider is "Intertelecom", a first CDMA operator in Ukraine. 3G is available with external antenna only. The school and medical office have wired phones, provided by "Ukrtelecom".

== See also ==
- Bessarabia
- Budjak (Southern Bessarabia)
