= Prymorske, Lyman rural hromada, Bilhorod-Dnistrovskyi Raion, Odesa Oblast =

Prymorske
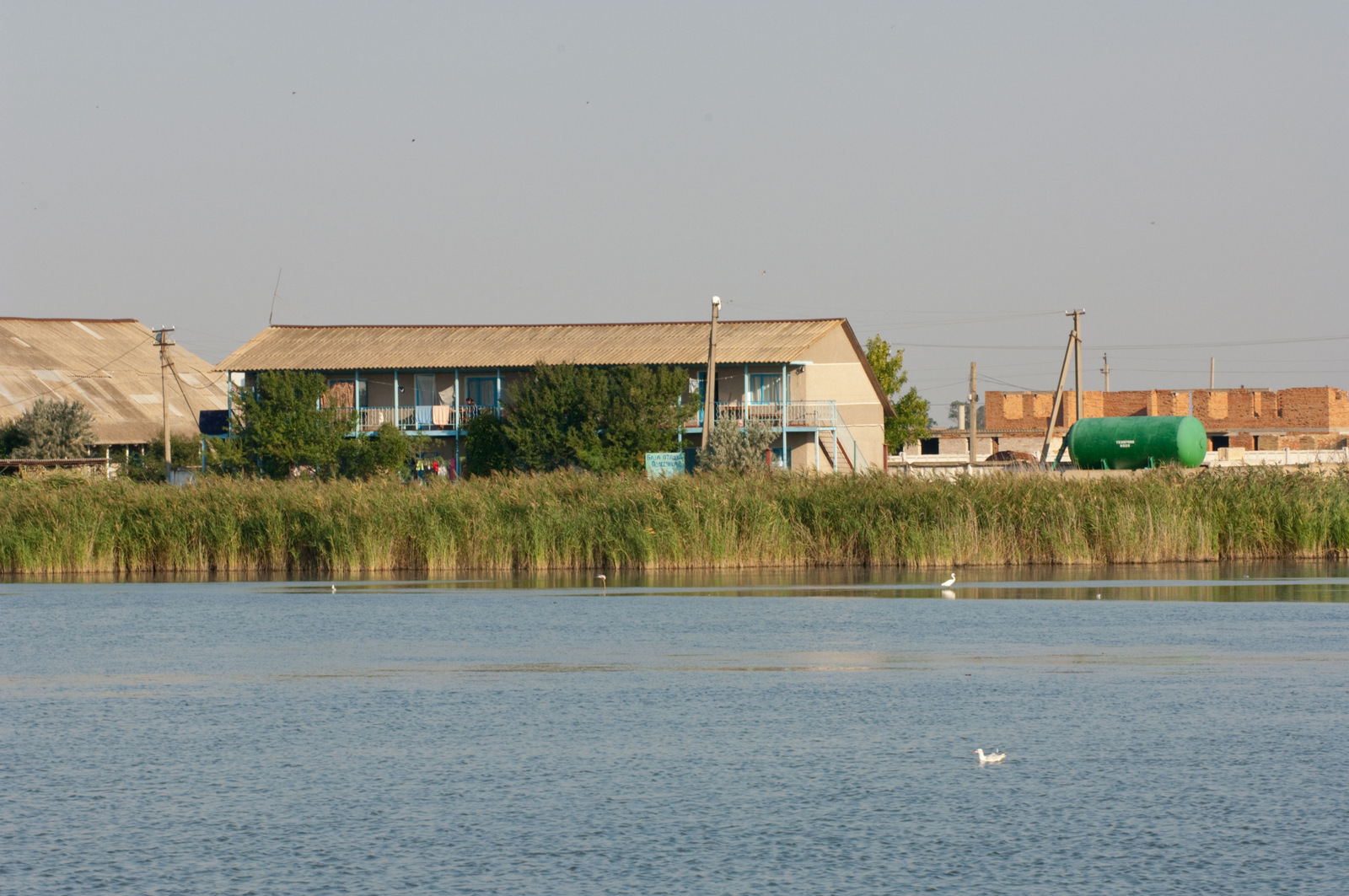
- Interactive map of Prymorske
- Location within Odesa Oblast Location within Ukraine
- Coordinates: 45°41′30″N 29°47′40″E
- Country: Ukraine
- Oblast: Odesa Oblast
- Raion: Bilhorod-Dnistrovskyi Raion
- Hromada: Lyman rural hromada
- Time zone: UTC+2 (EET (Kyiv))
  - Summer (DST): UTC+3 (EEST)

Prymorske (known as Shagani until 1945; Romanian: Șagani) is a village in Bilhorod-Dnistrovskyi Raion, Ukraine. it belongs to Lyman rural hromada, one of the hromadas of Ukraine.

== History ==
The village was founded by cossacks from Danubian Sich on the place of the former Tatar settlement Biyuk-Shagin. Before Soviet occupation of Bessarabia and Northern Bukovina, the village was as part of Kingdom of Romania. The previous name of the village was "Shagani". It was renamed to its current name on 14 November 1945.

Until 18 July 2020, Prymorske belonged to Tatarbunary Raion. In July 2020, as part of the administrative reform of Ukraine, which reduced the number of raions of Odesa Oblast to seven, Tatarbunary Raion was merged into Bilhorod-Dnistrovskyi Raion.

== Population ==
Distribution of the population by native language according to the 2001 census:

Language	Percentage
Ukrainian	94.84%
Russian	3.48%
Bulgarian	0.81%
Romanian	0.65%
Belarusian	0.16%
Gagauzian	0.05%
