= Novomykhailivka, Bilhorod-Dnistrovskyi Raion, Odesa Oblast =

Novomykhailivka Новомихайлівка
- Location in Odesa Oblast#Location in Ukraine Novomykhailivka (Ukraine)
- Coordinates: 45°50′23″N 30°04′12″E
- Country: Ukraine
- Oblast: Odesa Oblast
- Raion: Bilhorod-Dnistrovskyi Raion
- Hromada: Tuzly rural hromada

Population (2001)
  - Total: 105
- Time zone: UTC+2 (EET)
  - Summer (DST): UTC+3 (EEST)

Novomykhailivka is a village located in Bilhorod-Dnistrovskyi Raion of Odesa Oblast, Ukraine. It belongs to Tuzly rural hromada, one of the hromadas of Ukraine.

Until 18 July 2020, Novomykhailivka belonged to Tatarbunary Raion. The raion was abolished in July 2020 as part of the administrative reform of Ukraine, which reduced the number of raions of Odesa Oblast to seven. The area of Tatarbunary Raion was merged into Bilhorod-Dnistrovskyi Raion.

== Demographics ==
According to the 1989 census, the population of the village was 154 people, of whom 67 were men and 87 were women. According to the 2001 census of Ukraine, 105 people lived in the village.

=== Languages ===
Native language as of the Ukrainian Census of 2001:

Language	Percentage
Ukrainian	97.17 %
Russian	2.83 %
