= Serhiivka missile strike =

July 2022 missile attack in Ukraine

- Part of the 2022 Russian invasion of Ukraine
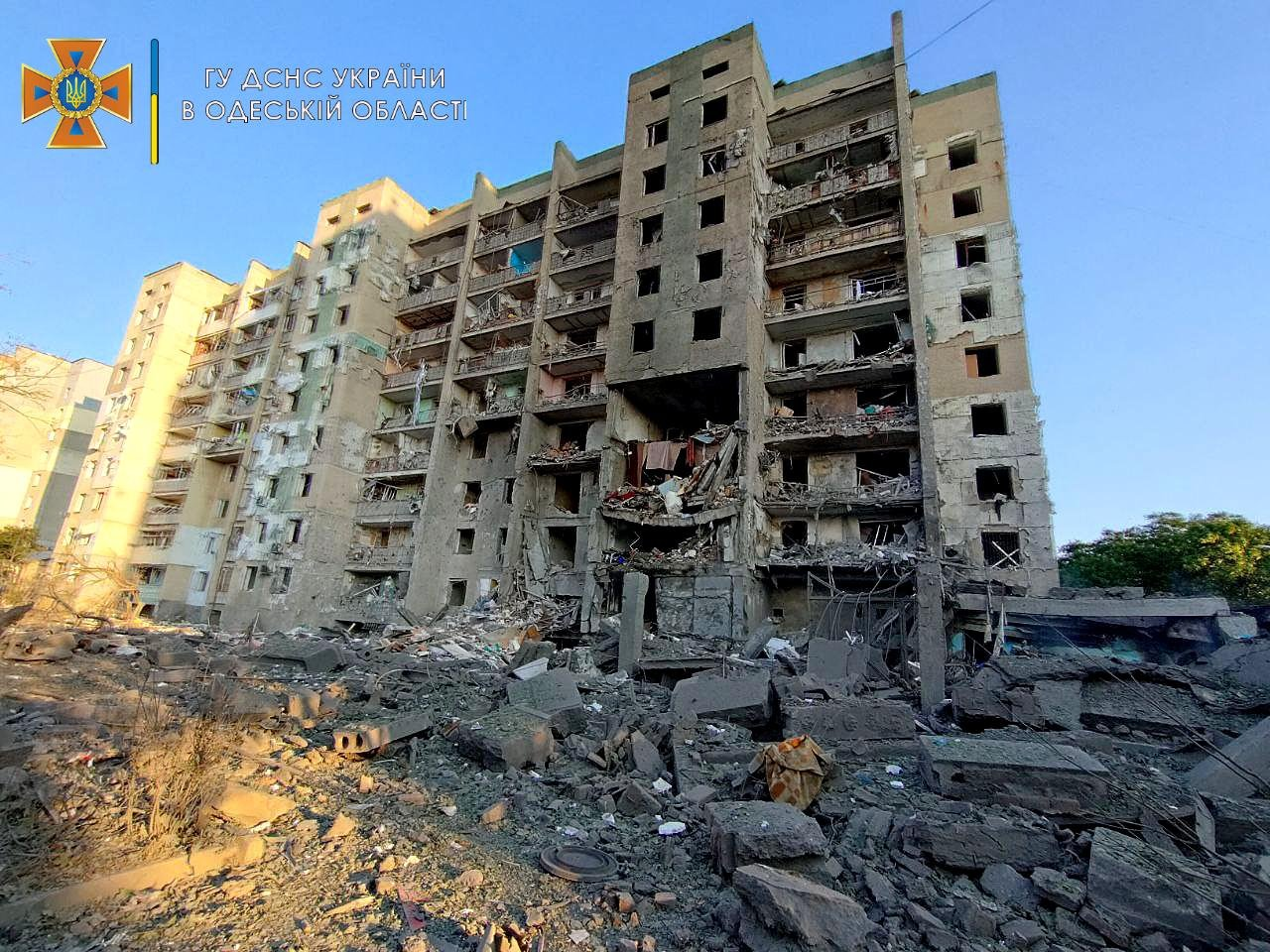
- The residential building after the strike
- Location: 46.0234359°N 30.3569191°E; Serhiivka, Serhiivka settlement hromada, Bilhorod-Dnistrovskyi Raion, Odesa Oblast, Ukraine
- Date: 1 July 2022; 01:00 AM (UTC+3)
- Target: Residential building and recreation facility
- Attack type: Missile strike
- Deaths: 21 (including 1 child)
- Injuries: 38 (including 6 children)
- Perpetrator: Russian Air Force

The residential building with attached shop after the strike

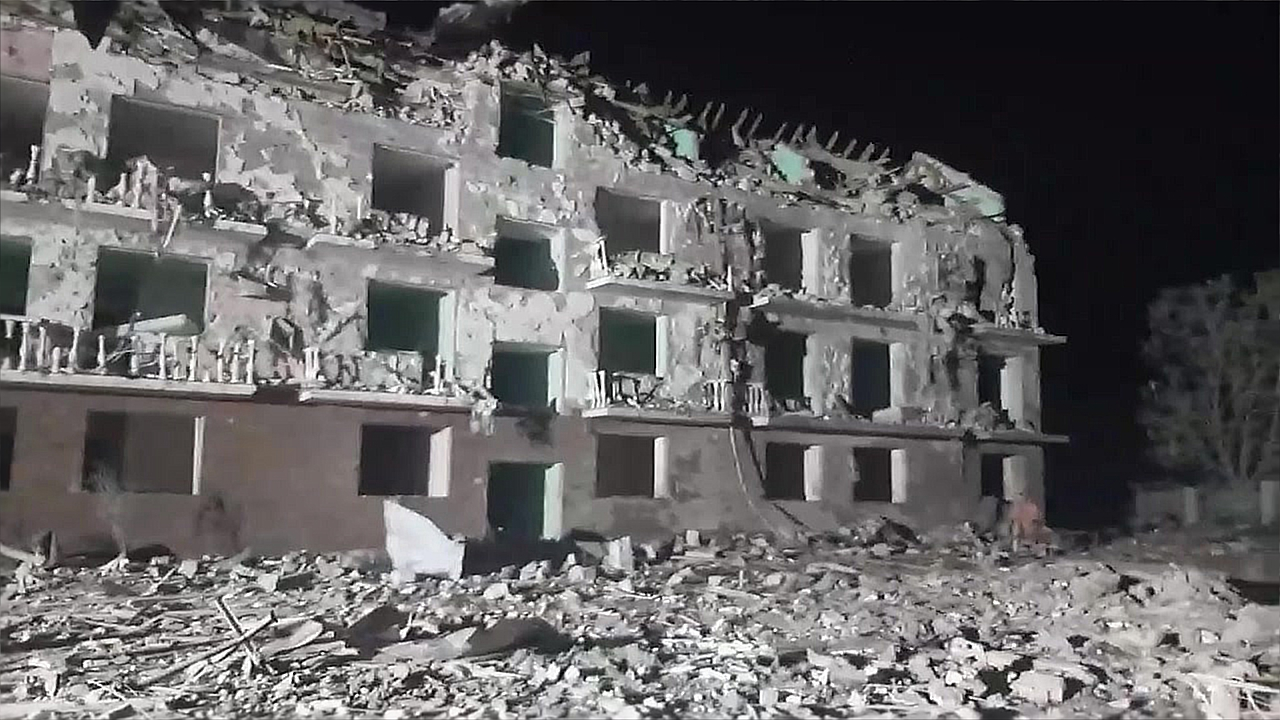
The recreational center after the strike

On 1 July 2022, at 01:00 am (UTC+3), a Russian missile hit a residential building and two missiles hit a recreational center in Serhiivka, Bilhorod-Dnistrovskyi Raion, Odesa Oblast. The missile strike killed at least 21 people (including a 12-year-old boy). July 2 was declared a day of mourning in the region.

== Course of events ==
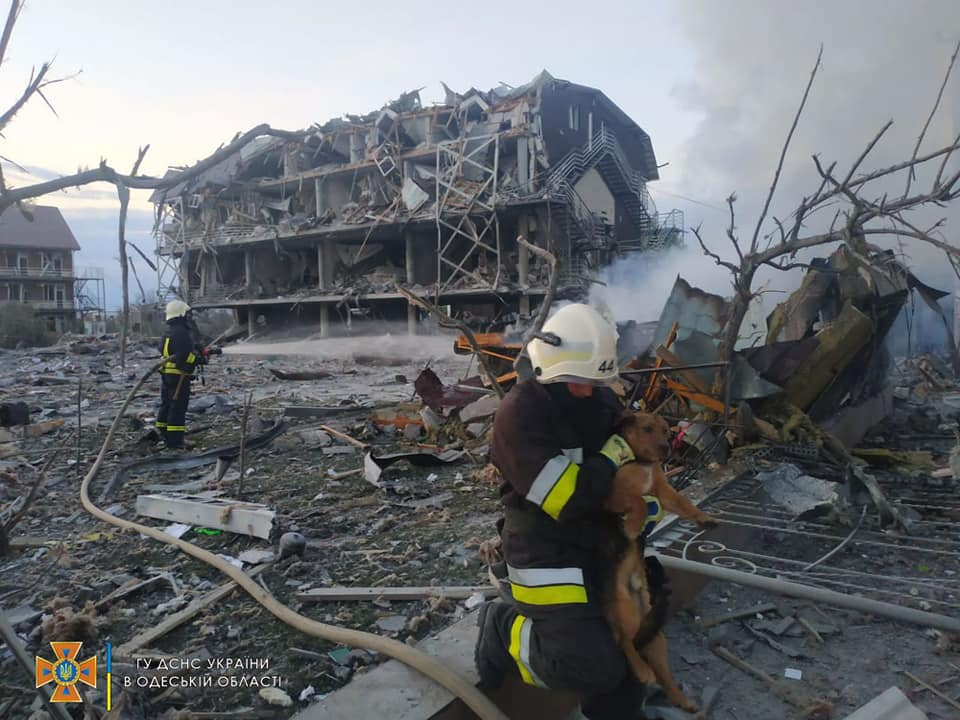
Russian destruction of another Ukrainian recreational center in same district on May 9, 2022

According to preliminary information, three Tu-22M3 aircraft of the Russian Air Force flew from Volgograd Oblast to Crimea, and after 1,200 kilometres (750 mi) fired three Kh-22s, supersonic anti-ship missiles designed for use against aircraft carriers, in the direction of the Bilhorod-Dnistrovskyi district to the resort Serhiivka village.

One missile hit a 9-story residential building, completely destroying one section. The fire spread from the apartment building to the attached store.

The second missile hit a recreation center in the Bilhorod-Dnistrovskyi region. The fire did not start at the recreation center.

As a result of these strikes, a rehabilitation center for children administered by Moldova in the village was hit. One of its workers died and five others were injured.

== Victims ==
According to preliminary data, at least 16 Ukrainian civilians were killed in the residential building and at least 5 (including a 12 year old boy) in the recreation center. 38 were injured (including 6 children). In addition to people, pets also have died.

== Reactions ==
2 July was declared a day of mourning in the region. The Ministry of Foreign Affairs and European Integration of Moldova condemned the attack and gave information about the damages the Moldovan rehabilitation center had suffered. Romania also condemned the attack, and said that the Romanian authorities would be in contact with its Moldovan partners.

Ukrainian President Zelenskyy accused Russia of having committed "an act of conscious, deliberately targeted Russian terror – and not some kind of mistake." He noted that as in the recent Kremenchuk shopping mall attack, the Russian army used unnecessarily powerful weapons to strike a civilian object: "These missiles, Kh-22, were designed to destroy aircraft carriers and other large warships, and the Russian army used them against an ordinary nine-story building with ordinary civilian people."

Official representative of Germany Steffen Hebestreit described the missile strike as an "inhumane and cynical" war crime.

A spokesman of the Russian Presidency, Dmitry Peskov, denied that Russia was attacking civilian objects in Ukraine and said that the targeted buildings were used for military purposes. Amnesty International visited the locations and studied satellite imagery, finding no evidence that the targeted buildings were used by the military.
