= Serhiivka, Kulevcha rural hromada, Bilhorod-Dnistrovskyi Raion, Odesa Oblast =

Village in Odesa Oblast, Ukraine

Serhiivka Сергіївка
- Village
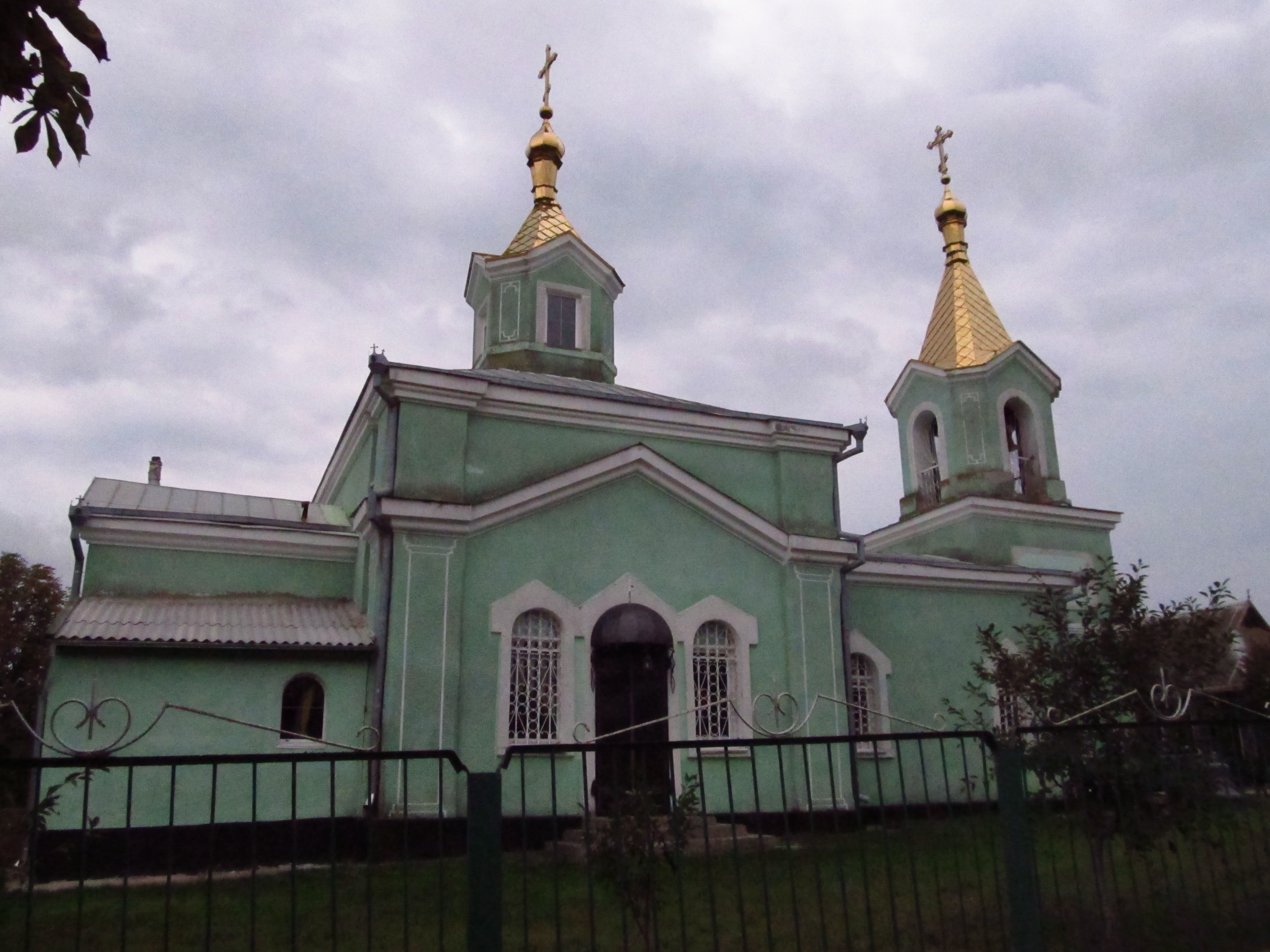

- Location in Ukraine Serhiivka (Ukraine)
- Coordinates: 45°59′53″N 29°57′17″E
- Country: Ukraine
- Oblast: Odesa Oblast
- Raion: Bilhorod-Dnistrovskyi Raion
- Hromada: Kulevcha rural hromada
- Founded: 1827

Area
  - Total: 2.67 km^{2} (1.03 sq mi)
- Elevation: 30 m (98 ft)

Population (2001)
  - Total: 1,408
  - Density: 527/km^{2} (1,370/sq mi)
- Time zone: UTC+2 (EET)
  - Summer (DST): UTC+3 (EEST)
- Postal code: 68263
- Area code: +380-4848

Serhiivka (Ukrainian: Сергіївка; Romanian: Sergheevca) is a village located in the Bilhorod-Dnistrovskyi Raion of Odesa Oblast (region) of central Ukraine. It forms part of Kulevcha rural hromada, one of the hromadas of Ukraine.

== History ==
As of 1886, 1,126 people lived in the village of the Divisional Volost of the Akkermansky Uyezd of the Bessarabia Governorate, there were 170 farmsteads, and there was an Orthodox church and a bench.

Until 18 July 2020, Serhiivka was located in Sarata Raion. The raion was abolished in July 2020 as part of the administrative reform of Ukraine, which reduced the number of raions of Odesa Oblast to seven. The area of Sarata Raion was merged into Bilhorod-Dnistrovskyi Raion.

== Demographics ==
According to the 1989 Soviet census, the population of the village was 1,556 people, of whom 672 were men and 884 women.

According to the 2001 Ukrainian census, 1408 people lived in the village.

=== Languages ===
According to the 2001 census, the primary languages of the inhabitants of the village were:

| Language | Percentage |
|---|---|
| Russian | 82.89 % |
| Ukrainian | 9.23 % |
| Bulgarian | 5.00 % |
| Moldovan (Romanian) | 2.11 % |
| Romani | 0.49 % |
| Belarusian | 0.07 % |
| Armenian | 0.07 % |
| German | 0.07 % |
