= Lebedivka =

Village in Odesa Oblast, Ukraine

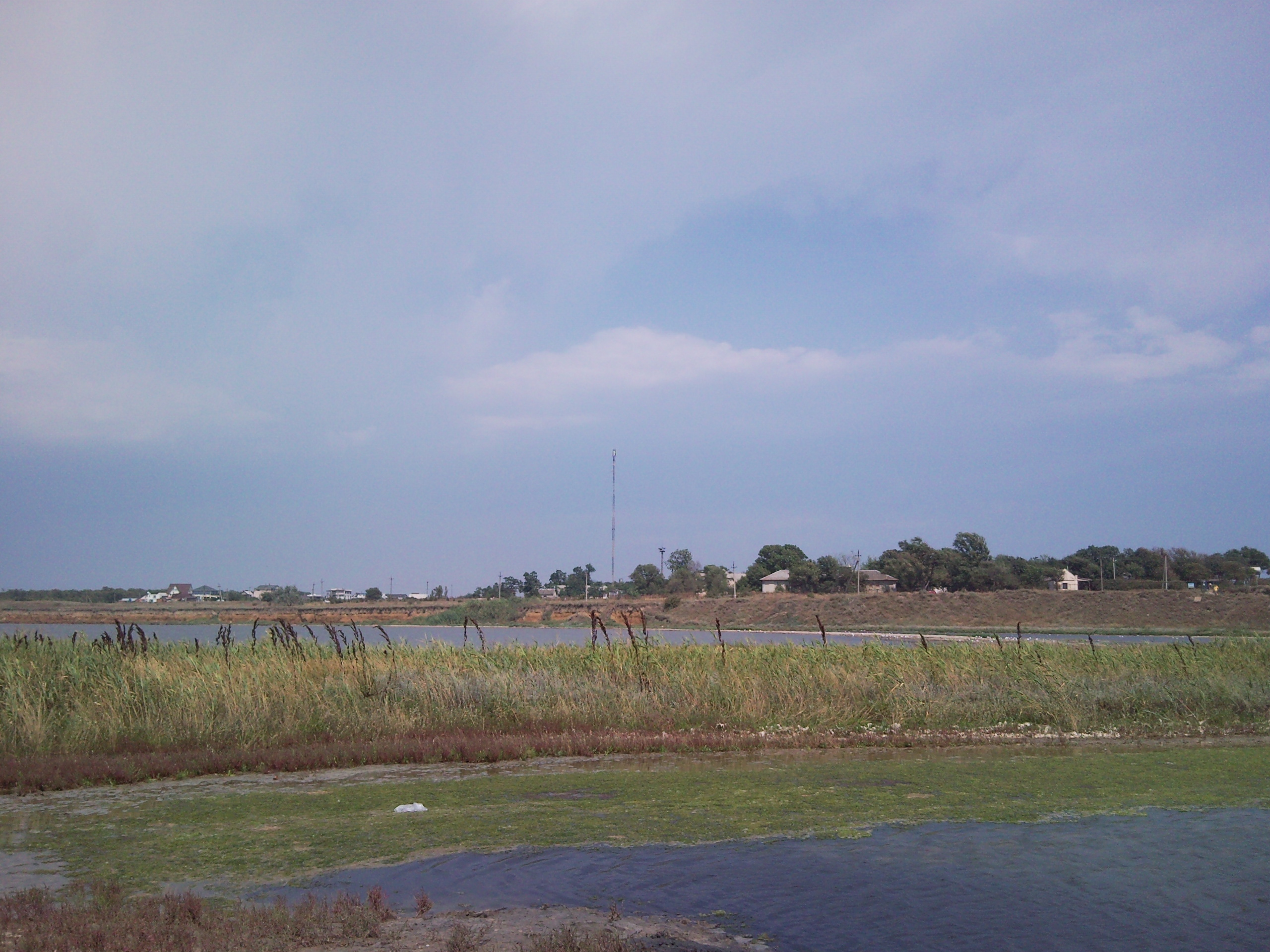

- Location within Odesa Oblast Location within Ukraine
- Coordinates: 45°49′33″N 30°8′48″E
- Country: Ukraine
- Oblast: Odesa Oblast
- Raion: Bilhorod-Dnistrovskyi Raion
- Hromada: Tuzly rural hromada

Population (2001)
  - Total: 26
- Time zone: UTC+2 (EET (Kyiv))
  - Summer (DST): UTC+3 (EEST)

Lebedivka (Ukrainian: Лебедівка) is a locality in Bilhorod-Dnistrovskyi Raion in the Odesa Oblast of Ukraine. It belongs to Tuzly rural hromada, one of the hromadas of Ukraine. In the 2001 census, it had a population of 26.

Until 18 July 2020, Lebedivka belonged to Tatarbunary Raion. In July 2020, as part of the administrative reform of Ukraine, which reduced the number of raions of Odesa Oblast to seven, Tatarbunary Raion was merged into Bilhorod-Dnistrovskyi Raion.
