= Vesela Balka =

Vesela Balka (Ukrainian: Весела Балка) may refer to the following places in Ukraine:

- Vesela Balka, Mykolaiv Oblast, village in Kazanka Raion, Mykolaiv Oblast
- Vesela Balka, Bilhorod-Dnistrovskyi Raion, Odesa Oblast, village in Bilhorod-Dnistrovskyi Raion, Odesa Oblast
- Vesela Balka, Rozdilna Raion, Odesa Oblast, village in Rozdilna Raion, Odesa Oblast
