= Prymorske, Serhiivka settlement hromada, Bilhorod-Dnistrovskyi Raion, Odesa Oblast =

Prymorske Приморське
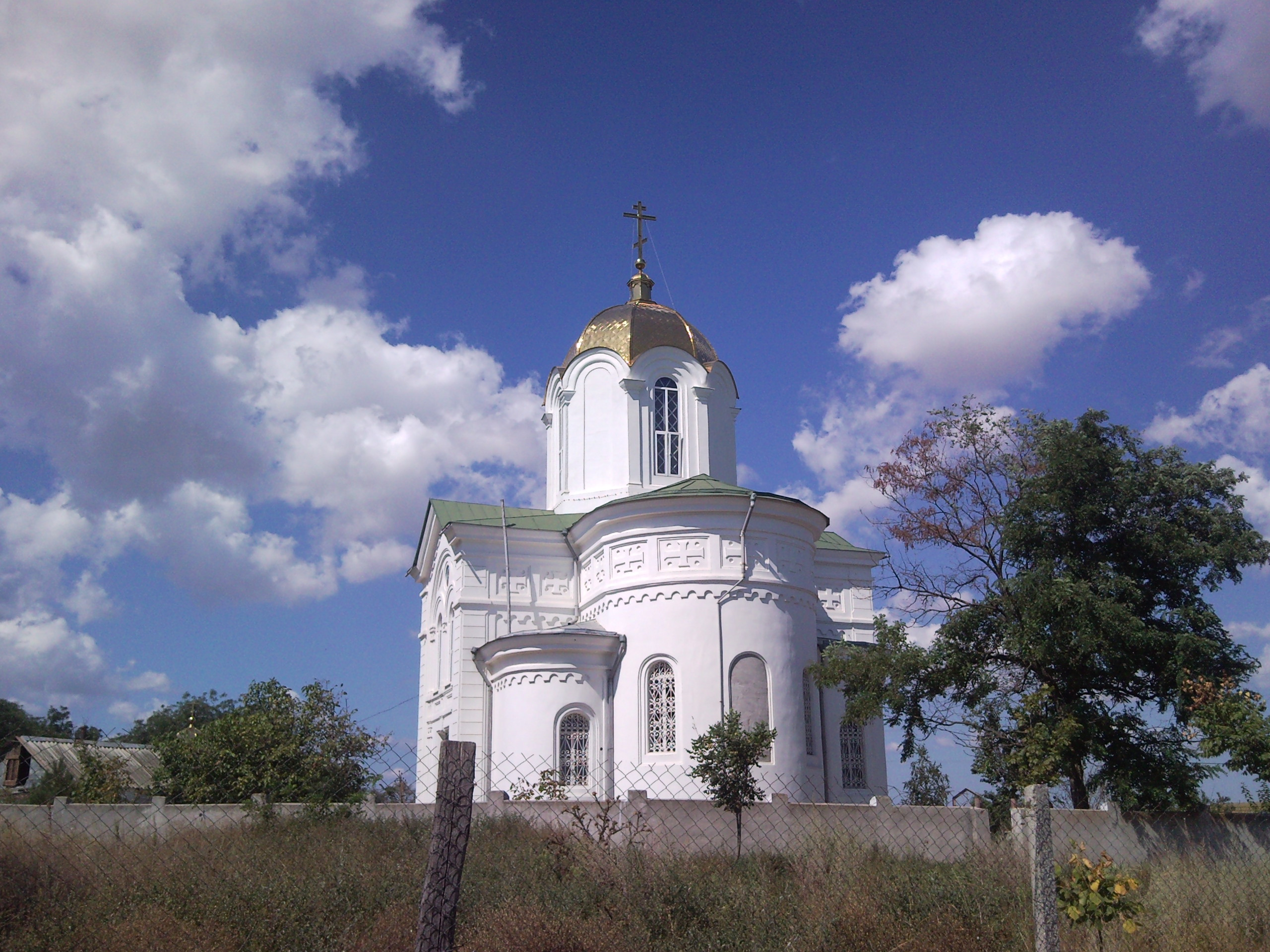

- Location within Odesa Oblast Location within Ukraine
- Country: Ukraine
- Oblast: Odesa Oblast
- Raion: Bilhorod-Dnistrovskyi Raion
- Hromada: Serhiivka settlement hromada
- Time zone: UTC+2 (EET (Kyiv))
  - Summer (DST): UTC+3 (EEST)

Prymorske is a village in Bilhorod-Dnistrovskyi Raion, Odesa Oblast, Ukraine. it belongs to Serhiivka settlement hromada, one of the hromadas of Ukraine.
