= Sarata Raion =

Former subdivision of Odesa Oblast, Ukraine

Sarata Raion Саратський район
- Raion
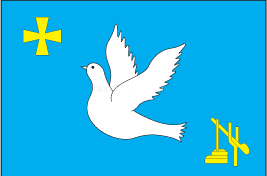
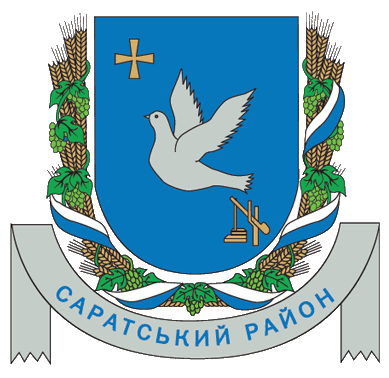
- Flag Coat of arms

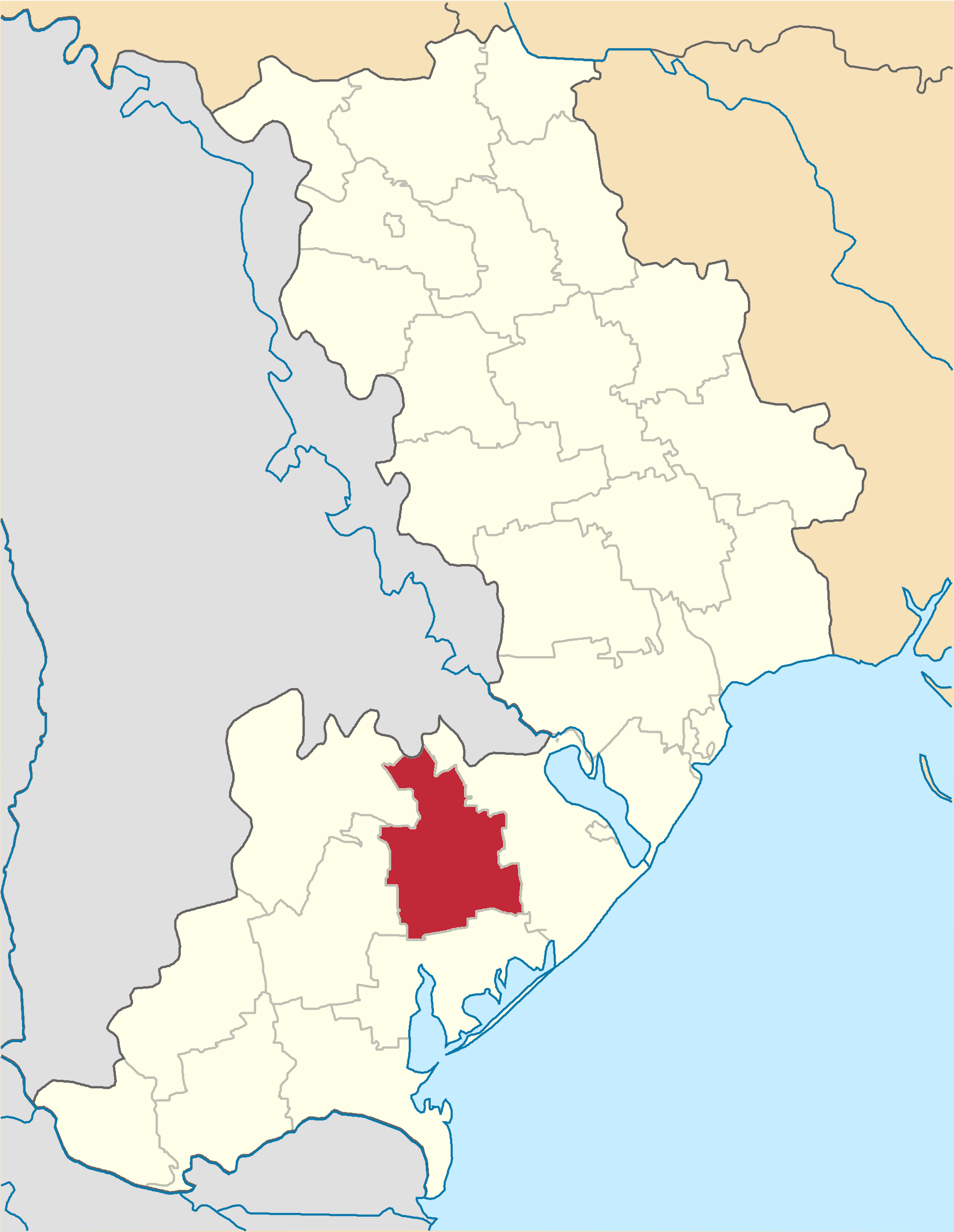
- Coordinates: 46°8′10″N 29°43′46″E
- Country: Ukraine
- Oblast: Odesa Oblast
- Established: 1965
- Disestablished: 18 July 2020
- Admin. center: Sarata
- Subdivisions: List: 0 — city councils; 1 — settlement councils; 22 — rural councils; Number of localities: 0 — cities; 1 — urban-type settlements; 37 — villages; 0 — rural settlements

Government
  - Governor: Anatoliy Korytnyi

Area
  - Total: 1,475 km^{2} (570 sq mi)

Population (2020)
  - Total: 44,171 ▼
  - Density: 29.95/km^{2} (77.56/sq mi)
- Time zone: UTC+02:00 (EET)
  - Summer (DST): UTC+03:00 (EEST)
- Postal index: 68200—68271
- Area code: +380 4848
- Website: http://sarata-rda.odessa.gov.ua

Sarata Raion (Ukrainian: Саратський район) was a raion (district) in Odesa Oblast of Ukraine. It was part of the historical region of Bessarabia. Its administrative center was the urban-type settlement of Sarata. The raion was abolished on 18 July 2020 as part of the administrative reform of Ukraine, which reduced the number of raions of Odesa Oblast to seven. The area of Sarata Raion was merged into Bilhorod-Dnistrovskyi Raion. The last estimate of the raion population was 44,171 (2020 est.). According to the 2001 census, the population was composed of speakers of Ukrainian (41.29%), Russian (21.42%), Bulgarian (19.13%) and Romanian (17.65%). Sarata raion, within its boundaries at that time, had in 2001 49,907 inhabitants, of which 43.92% were ethnic Ukrainians, 15.86% ethnic Russians, 18.91% Moldovans, 20.01% ethnic Bulgarians, 0.34% ethnic Gagauz and 0.04% Romanians.

At the time of disestablishment, the raion consisted of five hromadas:

- Kulevcha rural hromada with the administration in the selo of Kulevcha;
- Petropavlivka rural hromada with the administration in the selo of Petropavlivka;
- Plakhtiivka rural hromada with the administration in the selo of Plakhtiivka;
- Sarata settlement hromada with the administration in Sarata;
- Uspenivka rural hromada with the administration in the selo of Uspenivka.
