= Vesela Balka, Bilhorod-Dnistrovskyi Raion, Odesa Oblast =

Rural locality in Odesa Oblast, Ukraine

Vesela Balka Весела Балка
- Location in Ukraine Vesela Balka (Odesa Oblast)
- Coordinates: 45°51′10″N 30°02′28″E
- Country: Ukraine
- Oblast: Odesa Oblast
- Raion: Bilhorod-Dnistrovskyi Raion
- Hromada: Tuzly rural hromada

Area
  - Total: 0.55 km^{2} (0.21 sq mi)

Population (2001)
  - Total: 237
  - Density: 430/km^{2} (1,100/sq mi)
- Time zone: UTC+3 (+2)
- Postal code: 68160
- Area code: +380 4844

Vesela Balka (Ukrainian: Весела Балка, Russian: Весёлая Балка) is a village in Bilhorod-Dnistrovskyi Raion, Odesa Oblast, Ukraine. It belongs to Tuzly rural hromada, one of the hromadas of Ukraine.

Until 18 July 2020, Vesela Balka belonged to Tatarbunary Raion. The raion was abolished in July 2020 as part of the administrative reform of Ukraine, which reduced the number of raions of Odesa Oblast to seven. The area of Tatarbunary Raion was merged into Bilhorod-Dnistrovskyi Raion.

== Demographics ==
Native language as of the Ukrainian Census of 2001:

Language	Percentage
Ukrainian	99.58 %
Russian	0.42 %
