= Borysivka, Odesa Oblast =

Borysivka Борисівка (Ukrainian) Borisăuca (Romanian)
- Village
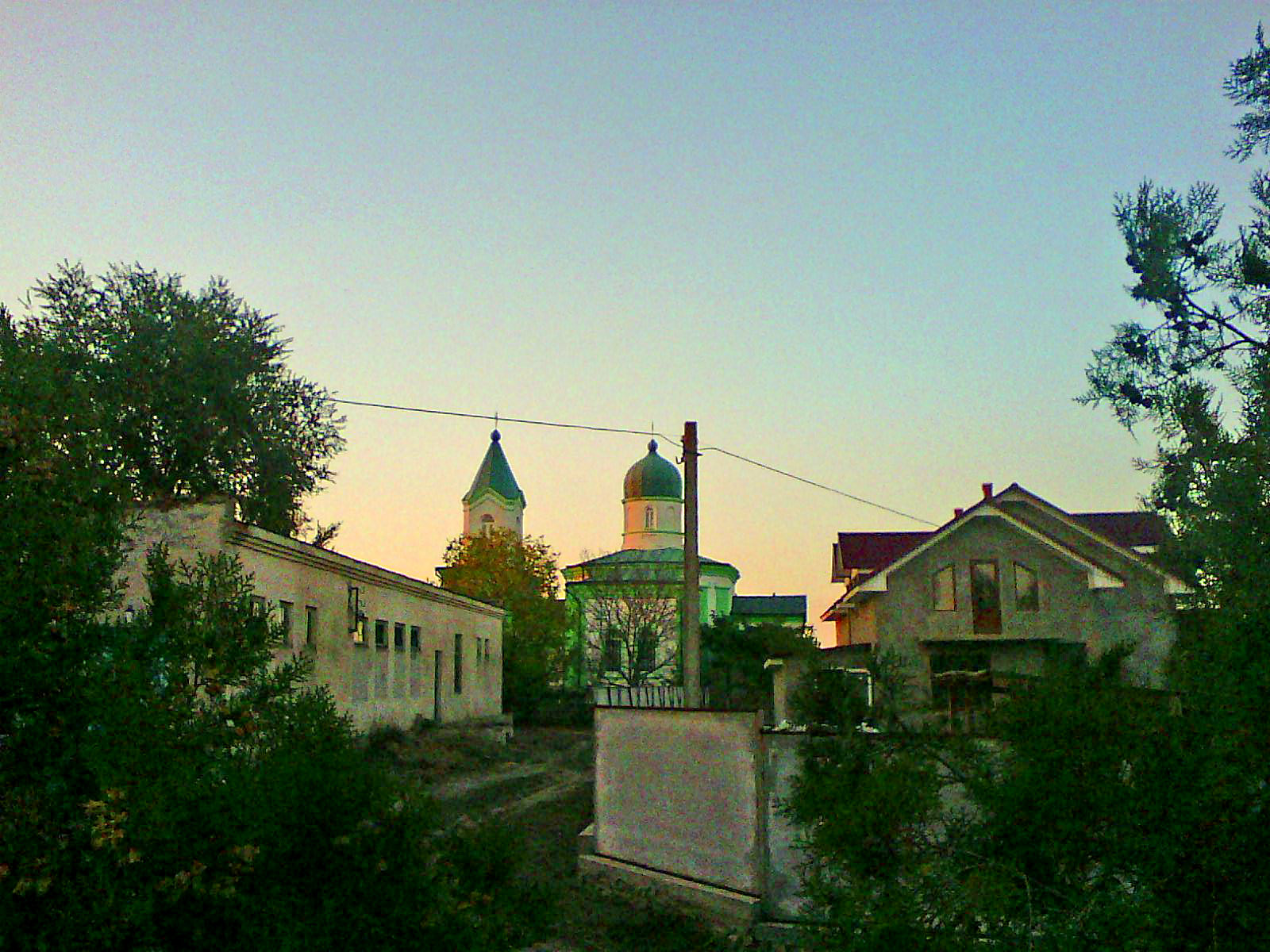

- Location within Odesa Oblast Location within Ukraine
- Coordinates: 45°47′22″N 29°38′17″E
- Country: Ukraine
- Oblast: Odesa Oblast
- Raion: Bilhorod-Dnistrovskyi Raion
- Hromada: Tatarbunary urban hromada
- Established: 1822

Area
  - Land: 1.55 km^{2} (0.60 sq mi)
- Elevation: 27 m (89 ft)

Population
  - Total: 1,803
  - Density: 1,163.23/km^{2} (3,012.8/sq mi)
- Postal code: 68112

Borysivka (Ukrainian: Борисівка; Romanian: Borisăuca) is a village in Tatarbunary urban hromada, Bilhorod-Dnistrovskyi Raion, Odesa Oblast, Ukraine. The population is 1,803 people.

A Romanian-inhabited village, its high school was the only in Odesa Oblast to feature education entirely in Romanian language as of 2026.

== Demographics ==
According to the 1989 Ukrainian SSR census, the population of the village was 1,748 people (849 men and 899 women). According to the 2001 Ukrainian census, the population was 1,783 people.

=== Language ===
Distribution of the population by native language according to the 2001 census:

Language	Percent of population
Romanian	91.80%
Ukrainian	3.55%
Russian	3.49%
Bulgarian	0.44%
Gagauz	0.33%
others	0.39%

The high school of Borysivka changed the name of the language used for teaching from "Moldovan" to Romanian and adopted the Romanian schools' curriculum in Ukraine on 25 May 2023, through a decision of the teaching staff. The high school was the first educational institution in Odesa Oblast to drop the term "Moldovan". As of 2026, the high school in Borysivka was the only educational institution in the oblast with education entirely in Romanian, with the other 11 institutions existing in Budjak at the time featuring Romanian-language education also including Ukrainian in a mixed system.

According to a decision by the Tatarbunary urban hromada's administration on 10 July 2026, the enrollment of 9th-grade students from the Borysivka high school into the 10th grade at the Romanian-language school was to be suspended, a move that would have entailed the students' transfer to a Ukrainian-language educational institution in Tatarbunary. The case caused concern among Romanians in Ukraine and drew the intervention of Romanian diplomacy, and the decision was reversed on 28 August, days before the start of the school year on 1 September.
