= Sarata =

Rural settlement in Odesa Oblast, Ukraine

Sarata Сарата Sărata (in Romanian)
- Rural settlement
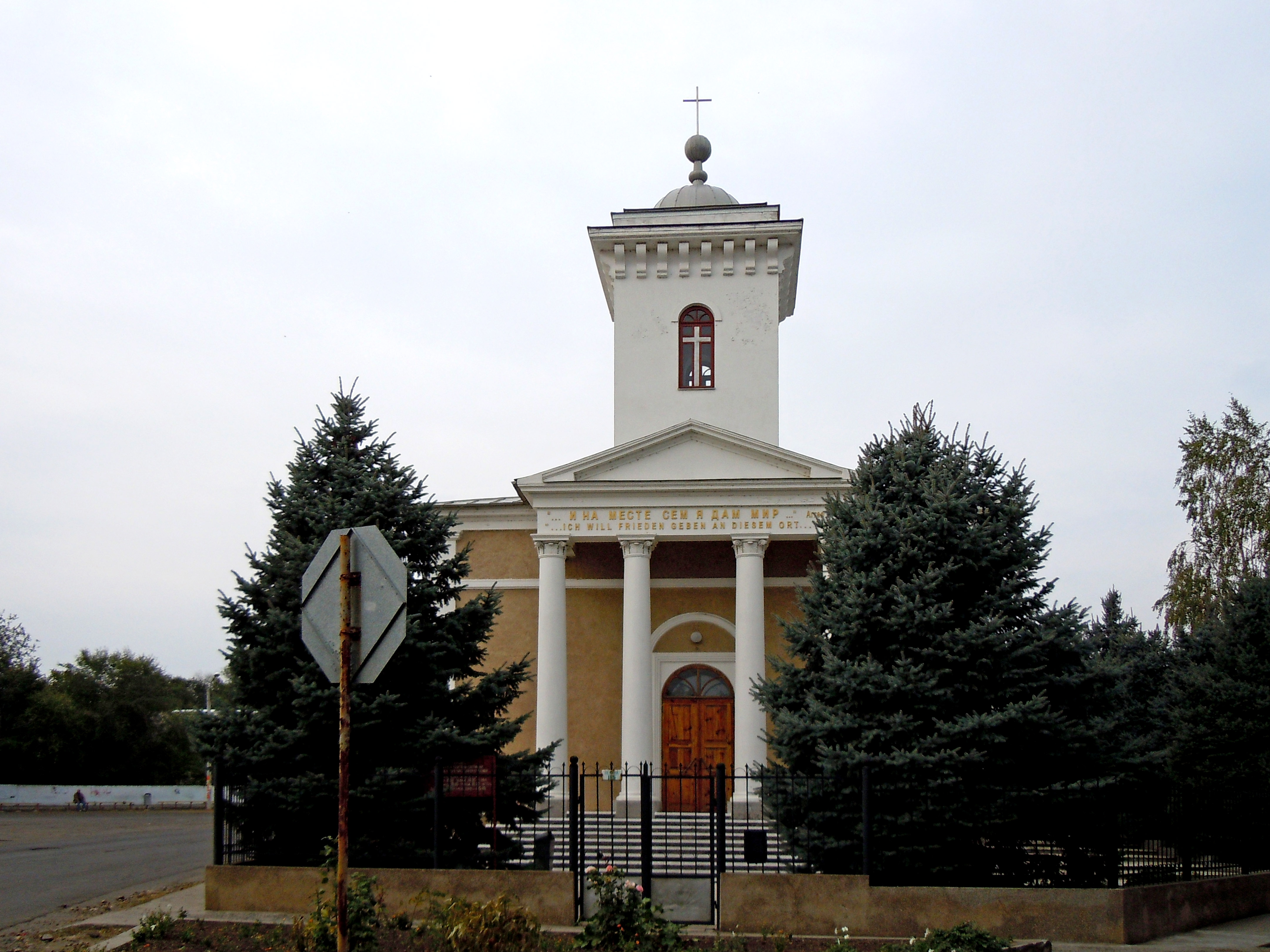

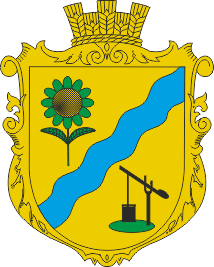
- Coat of arms

- Location within Odesa Oblast Location within Ukraine
- Coordinates: 46°01′23.5″N 29°39′47.3″E
- Country: Ukraine
- Oblast: Odesa Oblast
- Raion: Bilhorod-Dnistrovskyi Raion
- Hromada: Sarata settlement hromada

Population (2001)
  - Total: 5,200
- Time zone: UTC+2 (EET)
  - Summer (DST): UTC+3 (EEST)

Sarata (Ukrainian, Bulgarian, and Russian: Сарата; Romanian: Sărata) is a rural settlement in Bilhorod-Dnistrovskyi Raion, Odesa Oblast, south-western Ukraine. It is a part of the Bessarabian historic district of Budjak. Sarata hosts the administration of Sarata settlement hromada, one of the hromadas of Ukraine. Population: 4,159 (2022 estimate).

== History ==
=== Ottoman Period ===
The Sarata river valley and other adjacent Moldavian territories became Ottoman in 1484 following the conquest of Cetatea Albă (Turkish: Akkirman, Ukrainian: Bilhorod Dnistrovskyi) and Chilia by Sultan Bayezid II. The Sarata is mentioned frequently in Ottoman tax registers of the 16th century but no settlement of that name is known prior to 1597. The valley belonged to an area in the Budjak endowed by Sultan Selim I for the benefit of Mecca and Medina acquired by him in 1517. In 1610 the "qadi of Sarata" was involved in a conflict with Tatar noblemen (mirza) about the jurisdiction over the nomadic Tatar population living in the river valley. In the mid-17th century, Ottoman traveller Evliya Çelebi, called the village Sarı Ata. According to him it was inhabited by a majority of Tatars and he located the tomb of a Sufi mystic named Sarı Ata (Tatar/Turkish "Yellow Father") there. It is obvious that Evliya Çelebi derived Sarı Ata from Sarata by means of folk etymology as the hydronym actually goes back to Romanian "[apă] sărată" - "salty water".

=== German colony under Russian rule ===
Bessarabia came to the Russian Empire in 1812 following the Treaty of Bucharest when it was ceded from the Ottoman vassal Principality of Moldavia together with the adjacent Ottoman Budjak. The new acquisition was destined for colonization and initially assigned to the Governor General of New Russia. Tsar Alexander I, in a manifesto of 1813, called German colonists to the country to colonize the newly acquired steppe lands of New Russia. Here, in 1822, German emigrants reestablished Sarata and its agricultural lands on an allotted 16,000 dessiatins (approx. 18,000 ha). The village was one of originally 24 Bessarabian-German core colonies later joined by offshoots.

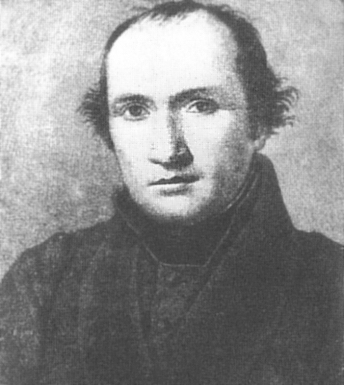
Ignaz Lindl

Of the emigrants who settled here in 1822, about 70 emigrant families came from Bavaria and Württemberg, including their leader, Pastor Ignaz Lindl. The families were of both Catholic and Protestant faith. Moving to Odesa first they arrived in covered wagons on March 19, 1822, at the Sarata River, where they built the village. The wealthy merchant Christian Friedrich Werner from Giengen an der Brenz joined them in 1823 at the age of 63, but died in Sarata just a few months later. Werner bequeathed his fortune of 25,000 rubles in silver to the Sarata community. From this funds a church was built around 1843, and in 1844 the Werner Evangelical German Teacher Training College (Evangelisch-deutsche Lehrerbildungsanstalt Werner), also called Werner School after its donor, was established. This was the first German-speaking teacher training institution in the Tsarist Empire and the only one in Bessarabia.

With his large audience among the faithful - in Germany, Saint Petersburg and Bessarabia up to 10,000 people came to his sermons - Lindl had enemies as well. They slandered him before the tsar, accusing him of being a popular rebel and a sectarian leader. In addition, despite his consecration as a Catholic priest, he entered into marriage with his housekeeper. As a result, Lindl was expelled by the Russian tsar in 1823. Werner's business partner Gottlieb Veygel took over as mayor of the Sarata community, which became Protestant. He ended the community of property introduced by Lindl and distributed the land to the families. On Sarata's original land of 16,000 dessiatins, the Bessarabian-German villages of Gnadental and Lichtental were also established in the 1830s.

=== 20th century ===
In 1917, the Moldovan Democratic Republic proclaimed its independence within the borders of Bessarabia, including the town of Sărata.

After the Union of Bessarabia with Romania on 27 March 1918, the village of Sărata became part of Romania, in the Tatar-Bunar district of the Cetatea Albă county. Subsequently, through the reorganization of the county, the commune of Sărata (the new name of the locality) was included in the district Sărata, but did not have the role of a district center. At that time, the majority of the population was German, with larger communities of Jews and Ukrainians. In the 1930 census, it was found that of the 2,661 inhabitants of the village, 1,948 were Germans (73.21%), 316 Jews (11.88%), 173 Ukrainians (6.50%), 89 Russians (3.34%), 75 Romanians (2.82%), 38 Bulgarians (1.43%), 13 Poles, 3 Czechs, 2 Armenians, 1 Hungarian and 1 Serb.

During the interwar period, a railway station, a state hospital, an orphanage and an old people's home operated here. There was also the "Iacob Staib" agricultural machinery factory.

In 1924, the village of Sărata (24 km north of Tatarbunar) was not occupied by the Bolshevik insurgents who had launched the so-called Tatarbunar Uprising. Their rebellion was not supported by the Romanian peasants of Bessarabia and the German settlers.

On the night of 15/16 September, the commander of the gendarmerie post in Achmanghit managed to flee to the village of Sărata, where he gathered a group of 40 ethnic German volunteers. On the morning of the 16th, the volunteers opened fire on the rebels led by Ivan Bejan and fought for several hours until the communists heard the army approaching and retreated to Tatarbunar. To quell the rebellion, the Romanian government sent artillery troops from the III Corps of the Romanian Army and a marine unit. The first military units from Cetatea Albă arrived in the area on the evening of 16 September 1924 and fought the rebels at the bridge between Tatarbunar and Achmanghit, shooting Ivan Bejan (Koltsov) dead.

After the Soviet occupation of Bessarabia in the summer of 1940, covered by the Hitler-Stalin Pact, the approximately 1,600 Bessarabian-German local inhabitants joined the resettlement to the German Reich and German-occupied territories in the fall of 1940 under the slogan "Heim ins Reich".

Until 18 July 2020, Sarata was the administrative center of Sarata Raion. The raion was abolished in July 2020 as part of the administrative reform of Ukraine, which reduced the number of raions of Odesa Oblast to seven. The area of Sarata Raion was merged into Bilhorod-Dnistrovskyi Raion.

Until 26 January 2024, Sarata was designated urban-type settlement. On this day, a new law entered into force which abolished this status, and Sarata became a rural settlement.

== Climate ==
Climate data for Sarata (1991–2020)
Month	Jan	Feb	Mar	Apr	May	Jun	Jul	Aug	Sep	Oct	Nov	Dec	Year
Mean daily maximum °C (°F)	2.7 (36.9)	5.2 (41.4)	10.5 (50.9)	17.0 (62.6)	23.3 (73.9)	27.7 (81.9)	30.2 (86.4)	30.1 (86.2)	23.6 (74.5)	17.2 (63.0)	10.2 (50.4)	4.4 (39.9)	16.8 (62.2)
Daily mean °C (°F)	−1.1 (30.0)	0.5 (32.9)	4.7 (40.5)	10.5 (50.9)	16.4 (61.5)	21.0 (69.8)	23.3 (73.9)	22.7 (72.9)	17.1 (62.8)	11.1 (52.0)	5.7 (42.3)	0.6 (33.1)	11.0 (51.8)
Mean daily minimum °C (°F)	−4.4 (24.1)	−3.3 (26.1)	0.1 (32.2)	4.5 (40.1)	9.7 (49.5)	14.3 (57.7)	16.2 (61.2)	15.5 (59.9)	10.7 (51.3)	6.0 (42.8)	1.8 (35.2)	−2.8 (27.0)	5.7 (42.3)
Average precipitation mm (inches)	34 (1.3)	25 (1.0)	29 (1.1)	29 (1.1)	42 (1.7)	62 (2.4)	52 (2.0)	45 (1.8)	48 (1.9)	37 (1.5)	37 (1.5)	35 (1.4)	475 (18.7)
Average precipitation days (≥ 1.0 mm)	5.9	4.9	5.8	5.2	6.3	6.3	5.2	4.0	4.0	4.8	5.1	5.8	63.3
Average relative humidity (%)	85.2	81.4	74.8	71.7	70.5	68.7	65.4	64.8	71.4	79.2	84.5	86.0	75.3
Source: NOAA

== Notable persons born in Sarata ==
- Immanuel Winkler (1886–1932), born in Sarata, priest 1911–1918 in Hoffnungstal and chairman of the main committee of the "All Russian association of Russian citizens of German nationality"
- Heinz Schöch (born 1940), German law professor and criminologist
- Hennadiy Hanyev (born 1990), footballer
- Vladyslav Supryaha (born 2000), footballer
