= Borysivka =

Borysivka (Ukrainian: Борисівка) is a common toponym (place name) in Ukraine. The name is a diminutive derivative of Borys.

== Villages ==
- Borysivka, Kharkiv Oblast
- Borysivka, Odesa Oblast
