= Moloha rural hromada =

Coordinates: 46°12′58″N 30°13′52″E

Moloha rural hromada Мологівська сільська громада
- Hromada
- Interactive map of Moloha rural hromada
- Country: Ukraine
- Oblast: Odesa Oblast
- Raion: Bilhorod-Dnistrovskyi Raion
- Admin. center: Moloha

Area
  - Total: 205.59 km^{2} (79.38 sq mi)

Population (2020)
  - Total: 15,792
  - Density: 76.813/km^{2} (198.94/sq mi)
- CATOTTG code: UA51040130000049323
- Settlements: 8
- Villages: 8

Moloha rural hromada (Ukrainian: Мологівська сільська громада) is a hromada in Bilhorod-Dnistrovskyi Raion of Odesa Oblast in southwestern Ukraine. Population: 15,792 (2020 est.)

The hromada consists of 8 villages:

- Andriivka
- Bykoza
- Vypasne
- Moloha (seat of administration)
- Nove
- Sadove
- Sukholuzhzhia
- Rozkishne

== Links ==
- Мологівська сільська ОТГ // Облікова картка на офіційному вебсайті Верховної Ради України.
- Децентралізація влади: Мологівська сільська громада
- gromada.info: Мологівська об'єднана територіальна громада
- http://atu.minregion.gov.ua/ua/ustriy_page/1665324573865804938
