= Sarata settlement hromada =

Coordinates: 46°03′N 29°36′E

Sarata settlement hromada Саратська селищна громада
- Hromada
- Interactive map of Sarata settlement hromada
- Country: Ukraine
- Oblast: Odesa Oblast
- Raion: Bilhorod-Dnistrovskyi Raion
- Admin. center: Sarata

Area
  - Total: 452.7 km^{2} (174.8 sq mi)

Population (2020)
  - Total: 16,742
  - Density: 36.98/km^{2} (95.78/sq mi)
- CATOTTG code: UA51040190000058077
- Settlements: 11
- Rural settlements: 1
- Villages: 10

Sarata settlement hromada (Ukrainian: Саратська селищна громада) is a hromada in Bilhorod-Dnistrovskyi Raion of Odesa Oblast in southwestern Ukraine, with an estimated 16,742 people as of 2020. It consists of the rural settlement of Sarata and ten villages:

- Dolynka
- Kamianka
- Mykhailivka
- Myrnopillia
- Nova Ivanivka
- Nova Plakhtiivka
- Novoselivka
- Svitlodolynske
- Vvedenka
- Zoria

== Links ==
- https://decentralization.gov.ua/newgromada/4373#
