= Serhiivka, Serhiivka settlement hromada, Bilhorod-Dnistrovskyi Raion, Odesa Oblast =

Rural locality in Odesa Oblast, Ukraine

Serhiivka Сергіївка
- Rural settlement
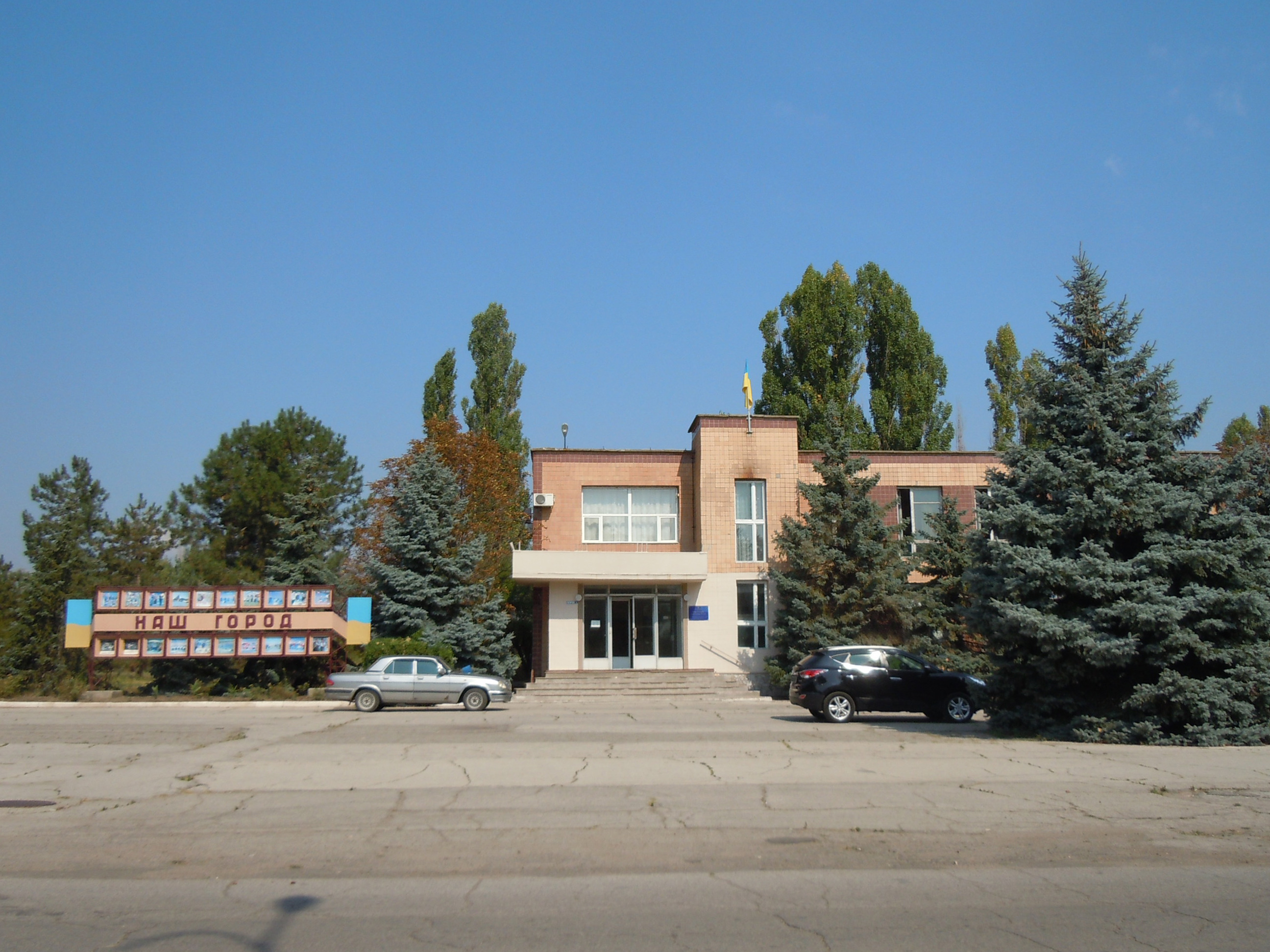
- Serhiivka Town hall

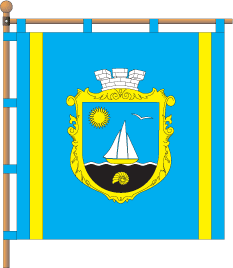
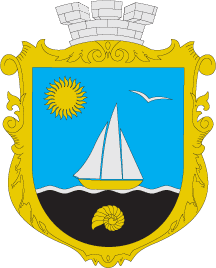
- Flag Coat of arms
- Interactive map of Serhiivka
- Location within Odesa Oblast Location within Ukraine
- Coordinates: 46°01′25″N 30°22′28″E
- Country: Ukraine
- Oblast: Odesa Oblast
- Raion: Bilhorod-Dnistrovskyi Raion
- Hromada: Serhiivka settlement hromada
- Founded: 1889

Area
  - Total: 4.44 km^{2} (1.71 sq mi)

Population (2022)
  - Total: 5,248
  - Density: 1,180/km^{2} (3,060/sq mi)
- Time zone: UTC+2 (EET)
  - Summer (DST): UTC+3 (EEST)
- Postal code: 67780
- Area code: +380 4849

Serhiivka (Ukrainian: Сергіївка; Romanian: Sergheevca or Serghiești; Russian: Сергеевка) is a rural settlement in Bilhorod-Dnistrovskyi Raion of Odesa Oblast in Ukraine. It is located at the Black Sea coast at the opening of Budaki Lagoon, about 10 kilometres (6.2 mi) of the city of Bilhorod-Dnistrovskyi. Serhiivka hosts the administration of Serhiivka settlement hromada, one of the hromadas of Ukraine. Population: 5,248 (2022 estimate).

== History ==
Until 18 July 2020, Serhiivka belonged to Bilhorod-Dnistrovskyi Municipality. The municipality was abolished as an administrative unit in July 2020 as part of the administrative reform of Ukraine, which reduced the number of raions of Odesa Oblast to seven. The area of Bilhorod-Dnistrovskyi Municipality was merged into Bilhorod-Dnistrovskyi Raion.

On 1 July 2022, a residential building and a recreation center in Serhiivka were hit by Russian rockets. At least 21 people were killed.

Until 26 January 2024, Serhiivka was designated urban-type settlement. On this day, a new law entered into force which abolished this status, and Serhiivka became a rural settlement.

== Economy ==
=== Transportation ===
The closest railway station is in Bilhorod-Dnistrovskyi, which has infrequent passenger connections with Odesa and Izmail.

The settlement has access to Highway H33 which connects Odesa and Bilhorod-Dnistrovskyi.
