= Tatarbunary urban hromada =

Coordinates: 45°49′N 29°35′E

Tatarbunary urban hromada Татарбунарська міська громада
- Hromada
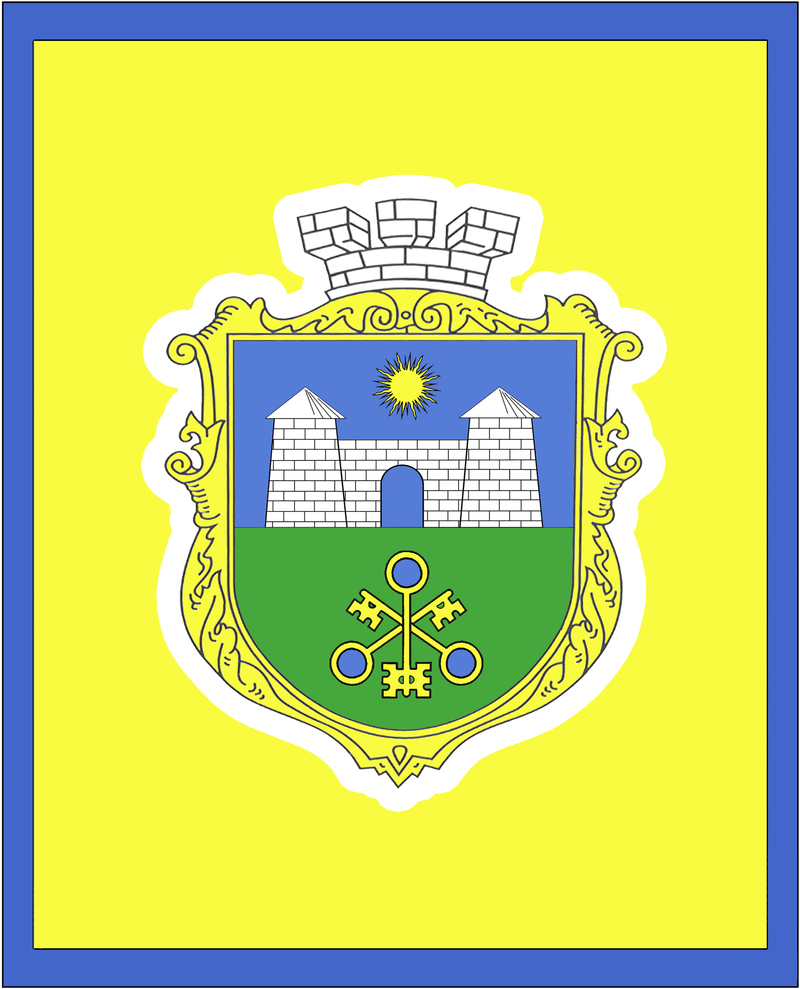
- Flag Coat of arms
- Interactive map of Tatarbunary urban hromada
- Country: Ukraine
- Oblast: Odesa Oblast
- Raion: Bilhorod-Dnistrovskyi Raion
- Admin. center: Tatarbunary

Area
  - Total: 616.7 km^{2} (238.1 sq mi)

Population (2015)
  - Total: 24,190
  - Density: 39.22/km^{2} (101.6/sq mi)
- CATOTTG code: UA51040250000099866
- Settlements: 10
- Cities: 1
- Villages: 9

Tatarbunary urban hromada (Ukrainian: Татарбунарська міська громада) is a hromada in Bilhorod-Dnistrovskyi Raion of Odesa Oblast in southwestern Ukraine. Population: 24,190 (2015 est.)

The hromada consists of a city of Tatarbunary and 9 villages:

- Bashtanka
- Bilolissia
- Borysivka
- Hlyboke
- Delzhyler
- Nerushai
- Nova Oleksiivka
- Strumok
- Spaske

The Tatarbunary urban hromada had 25,887 inhabitants in 2001, out of which 4,333 spoke Bulgarian (16.74%), 15,599 spoke Ukrainian (60.26%), 3,172 spoke Romanian (12.25%), 2,547 spoke Russian (9.84%) and 36 spoke Gagauz (0.14%).

== Links ==
- Татарбунарська міська громада // Облікова картка на офіційному вебсайті Верховної Ради України.
- Татарбунарська територіальна громада; decentralization.gov.ua.
- Паспорт Татарбунарської громади на сайті Одеського Центру розвитку місцевого самоврядування
- Татарбунарська громада; gromada.info.
