= Serhiivka settlement hromada =

Coordinates: 45°57′00″N 30°13′40″E

Serhiivka settlement hromada Сергіївська селищна громада
- Hromada
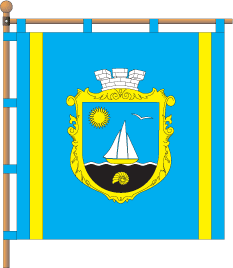
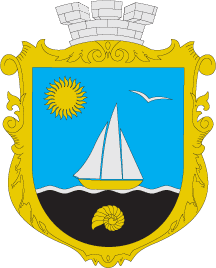
- Flag Coat of arms
- Interactive map of Serhiivka settlement hromada
- Country: Ukraine
- Oblast: Odesa Oblast
- Raion: Bilhorod-Dnistrovskyi Raion
- Admin. center: Serhiivka

Area
  - Total: 183.3 km^{2} (70.8 sq mi)

Population (2020)
  - Total: 9,475
  - Density: 51.69/km^{2} (133.9/sq mi)
- CATOTTG code: UA51040210000057879
- Settlements: 8
- Rural settlements: 1
- Villages: 7

Serhiivka settlement hromada (Ukrainian: Сергіївська селищна громада) is a hromada in Bilhorod-Dnistrovskyi Raion of Odesa Oblast in southwestern Ukraine. Population: 9,475 (2020 est.)

The hromada consists of a rural settlement of Serhiivka and 7 villages:

- Chabanske
- Kosivka
- Kurortne
- Mykolaivka
- Popazdra
- Prymorske
- Vilne

== Links ==
- https://decentralization.gov.ua/newgromada/4375#
