= Tuzly rural hromada =

Coordinates: 45°52′20″N 30°05′10″E

Tuzly rural hromada Тузлівська сільська громада
- Hromada
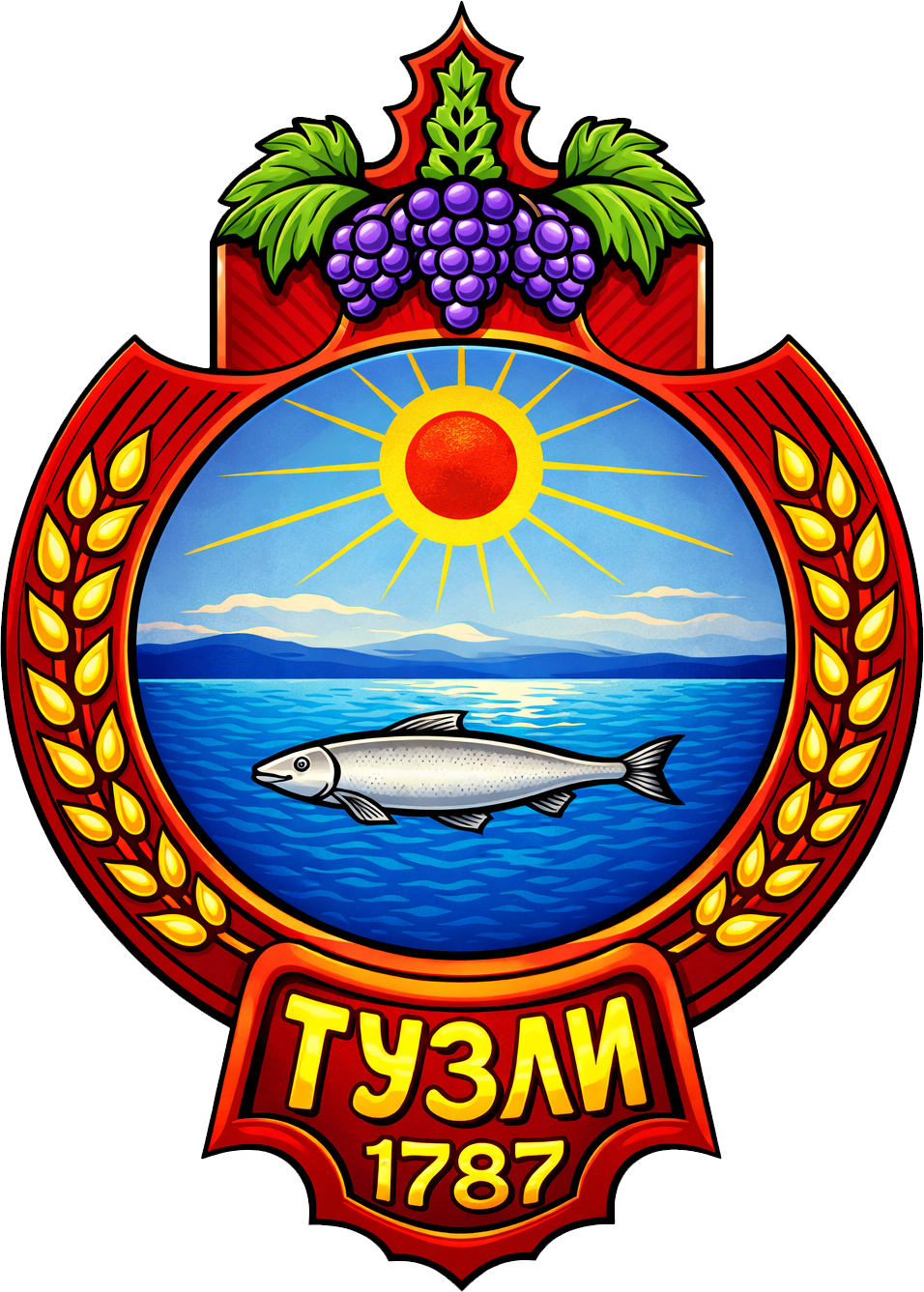
- Coat of arms
- Interactive map of Tuzly rural hromada
- Country: Ukraine
- Oblast: Odesa Oblast
- Raion: Bilhorod-Dnistrovskyi Raion
- Admin. center: Tuzly

Area
  - Total: 101 km^{2} (39 sq mi)

Population (2015)
  - Total: 2,545
  - Density: 25.2/km^{2} (65.3/sq mi)
- CATOTTG code: UA51040270000028361
- Settlements: 8
- Villages: 8
- Website: http://tuzlivska-gromada.gov.ua/

Tuzly rural hromada (Ukrainian: Тузлівська сільська громада) is a hromada in Bilhorod-Dnistrovskyi Raion of Odesa Oblast in southwestern Ukraine. Population: 2,545 (2015 est.)

The hromada consists of 8 villages:

- Bazarianka
- Bezimianka
- Lebedivka
- Novomykhailivka
- Sadove
- Tuzly (seat of administration)
- Vesela Balka
- Vesele

== Links ==
- Тузлівська сільська ОТГ // Облікова картка на офіційному вебсайті Верховної Ради України.
- http://gromada.info/gromada/tuzlivska/
- http://decentralization.gov.ua/region/common/id/27
