= Tatarbunary Raion =

Former subdivision of Odesa Oblast, Ukraine

Tatarbunary Raion Татарбунарський район
- Raion
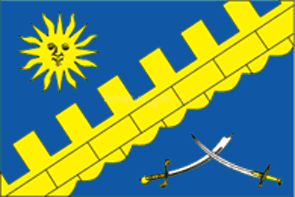
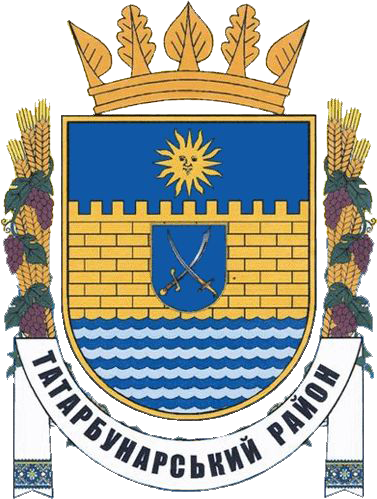
- Flag Coat of arms

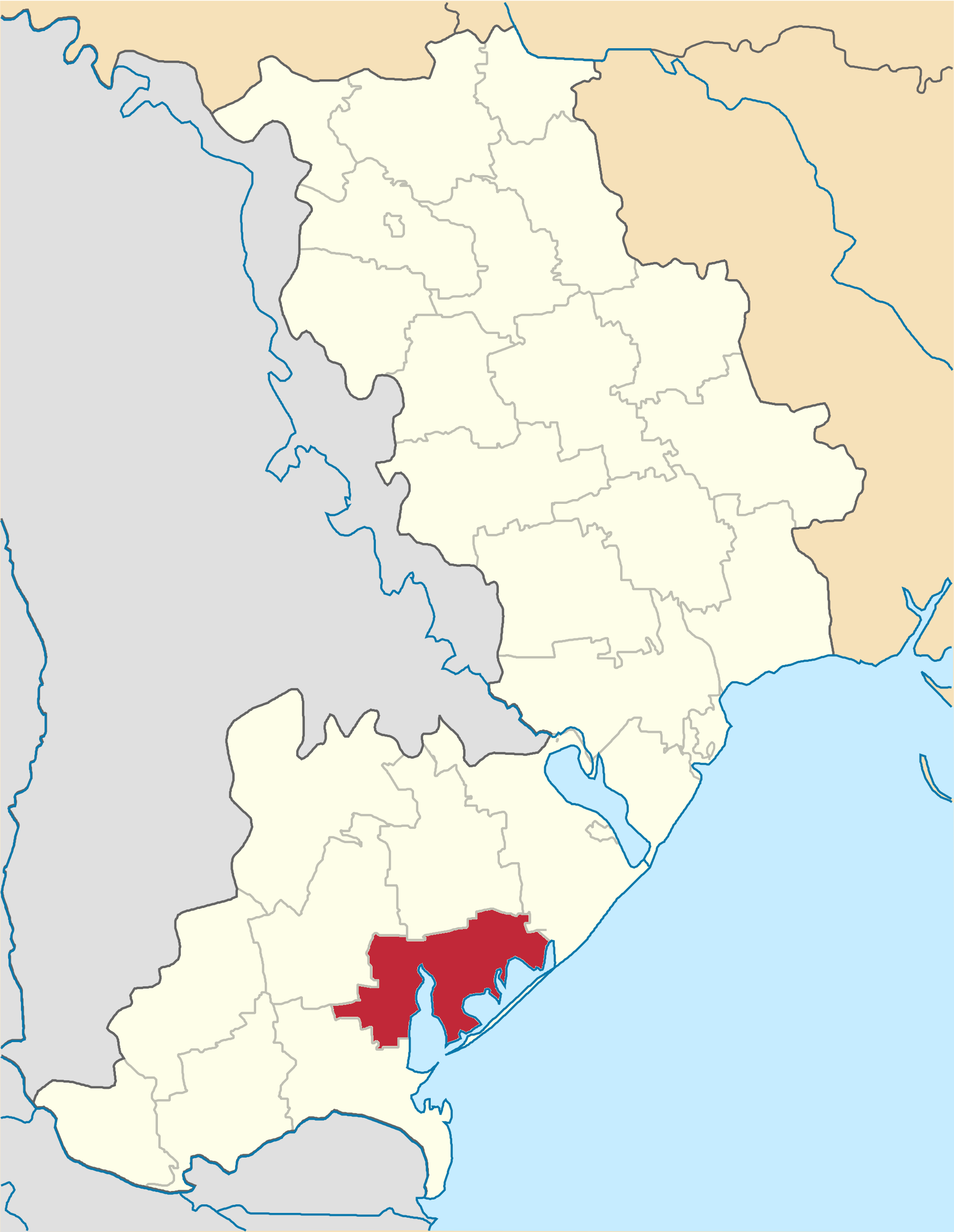
- Coordinates: 45°44′44″N 29°46′2″E
- Country: Ukraine
- Oblast: Odesa Oblast
- Disestablished: 18 July 2020
- Admin. center: Tatarbunary
- Subdivisions: List: 1 — city councils; 0 — settlement councils; 18 — rural councils; Number of localities: 1 — cities; 0 — urban-type settlements; 35 — villages; 0 — rural settlements

Area
  - Total: 1,748 km^{2} (675 sq mi)

Population (2020)
  - Total: 38,065
  - Density: 21.78/km^{2} (56.40/sq mi)
- Time zone: UTC+02:00 (EET)
  - Summer (DST): UTC+03:00 (EEST)
- Postal index: 68104
- Area code: +380 04844

Tatarbunary Raion (Ukrainian: Татарбунарський район) was a raion (district) in Odesa Oblast of Ukraine. The raion was located in the south-west part of the oblast, along the Black Sea coast, and it was part of the historical region of Bessarabia. Its administrative center was the city of Tatarbunary. The raion was abolished on 18 July 2020 as part of the administrative reform of Ukraine, which reduced the number of raions of Odesa Oblast to seven. The area of Tatarbunary Raion was merged into Bilhorod-Dnistrovskyi Raion. The last estimate of the raion population was 38,065 (2020 est.). According to the 2001 census, the majority of Tatarbunary raion's population spoke Ukrainian (72.4%), with a minority of Bulgarian (10.7%), Romanian (8.49%) and Russian (7.68%) speakers. Tatarbunary raion, within its boundaries at that time, had in 2001 41,710 inhabitants, of which 71.27% were ethnic Ukrainians, 6.42% ethnic Russians, 9.39% Moldovans, 11.48% ethnic Bulgarians, 0.24% ethnic Gagauz and 0.03% Romanians.

Geographically, there were 1 city (Tatarbunary), and 35 villages in the raion.

== History ==
Tatarbunary Raion was established in 1940, as one of 13 raions of newly established Akkerman Oblast (later Izmail Oblast) of Ukrainian SSR. The area was transferred from Kingdom of Romania to the USSR following June 1940 Soviet Ultimatum.

In 1954, Izmail Oblast was liquidated, and Tatarbunarskyi Raion, as well as other raions of the oblast, was transferred to Odesa Oblast.

In 1978, the administrative center of the raion, Tatarbunary, was given city status.

== Administrative divisions ==
At the time of disestablishment, the raion consisted of four hromadas:

- Dyvisiia rural hromada with the administration in the selo of Dyvisiia;
- Lyman rural hromada with the administration in the selo of Lyman;
- Tatarbunary urban hromada with the administration in Tatarbunary;
- Tuzly rural hromada with the administration in the selo of Tuzly.
