= Kulevcha rural hromada =

Coordinates: 46°01′4.350″N 29°56′47.278″E

Kulevcha rural hromada Кулевчанська сільська громада
- Hromada
- Interactive map of Kulevcha rural hromada
- Country: Ukraine
- Oblast: Odesa Oblast
- Raion: Bilhorod-Dnistrovskyi Raion
- Admin. center: Kulevcha

Area
  - Total: 210 km^{2} (81 sq mi)

Population (2020)
  - Total: 5,785
  - Density: 28/km^{2} (71/sq mi)
- CATOTTG code: UA51040070000074000
- Settlements: 4
- Villages: 4

Kulevcha rural hromada (Ukrainian: Кулевчанська сільська громада) is a hromada in Bilhorod-Dnistrovskyi Raion of Odesa Oblast in southwestern Ukraine. Population: 5,785 (2020 est.)

The hromada consists of 4 villages:

- Kostiantynivke
- Kulevcha (seat of administration)
- Rozivka
- Serhiivka

== Links ==
- https://decentralization.gov.ua/newgromada/4346#
- Паспорт Кулевчанської громади на сайті Одеського Центру розвитку місцевого самоврядування
