= Lyman rural hromada =

Lyman rural hromada Лиманська сільська громада
- Hromada
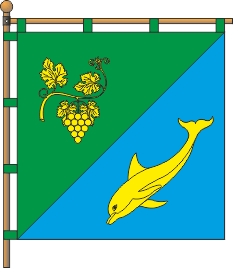
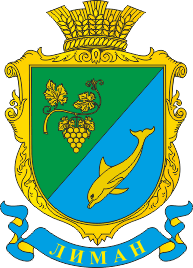
- Flag Coat of arms
- Interactive map of Lyman rural hromada
- Country: Ukraine
- Oblast: Odesa Oblast
- Raion: Bilhorod-Dnistrovskyi Raion
- Admin. center: Lyman

Area
  - Total: 145.7 km^{2} (56.3 sq mi)

Population (2020)
  - Total: 3,291
  - Density: 22.59/km^{2} (58.50/sq mi)
- CATOTTG code: UA51040090000096249
- Settlements: 6
- Villages: 6
- Website: http://lymanska.gromada.org.ua/

Lyman rural hromada (Ukrainian: Лиманська сільська громада) is a hromada in Bilhorod-Dnistrovskyi Raion of Odesa Oblast in southwestern Ukraine. Population: 3,291 (2020 est.)

The hromada consists of 6 villages:

- Lyman (seat of administration)
- Novoselytsia
- Prymorske
- Trapivka
- Trykhatky
- Zarichne

== Links ==
- Лиманська сільська ОТГ // Облікова картка на офіційному вебсайті Верховної Ради України.
- gromada.info: Лиманська об’єднана територіальна громада
- Децентралізація влади: Лиманська сільська громада
