= Tatarbunary =

City in Odesa Oblast, Ukraine

Tatarbunary Татарбунари Tatarpınarı (in Turkish)
- City
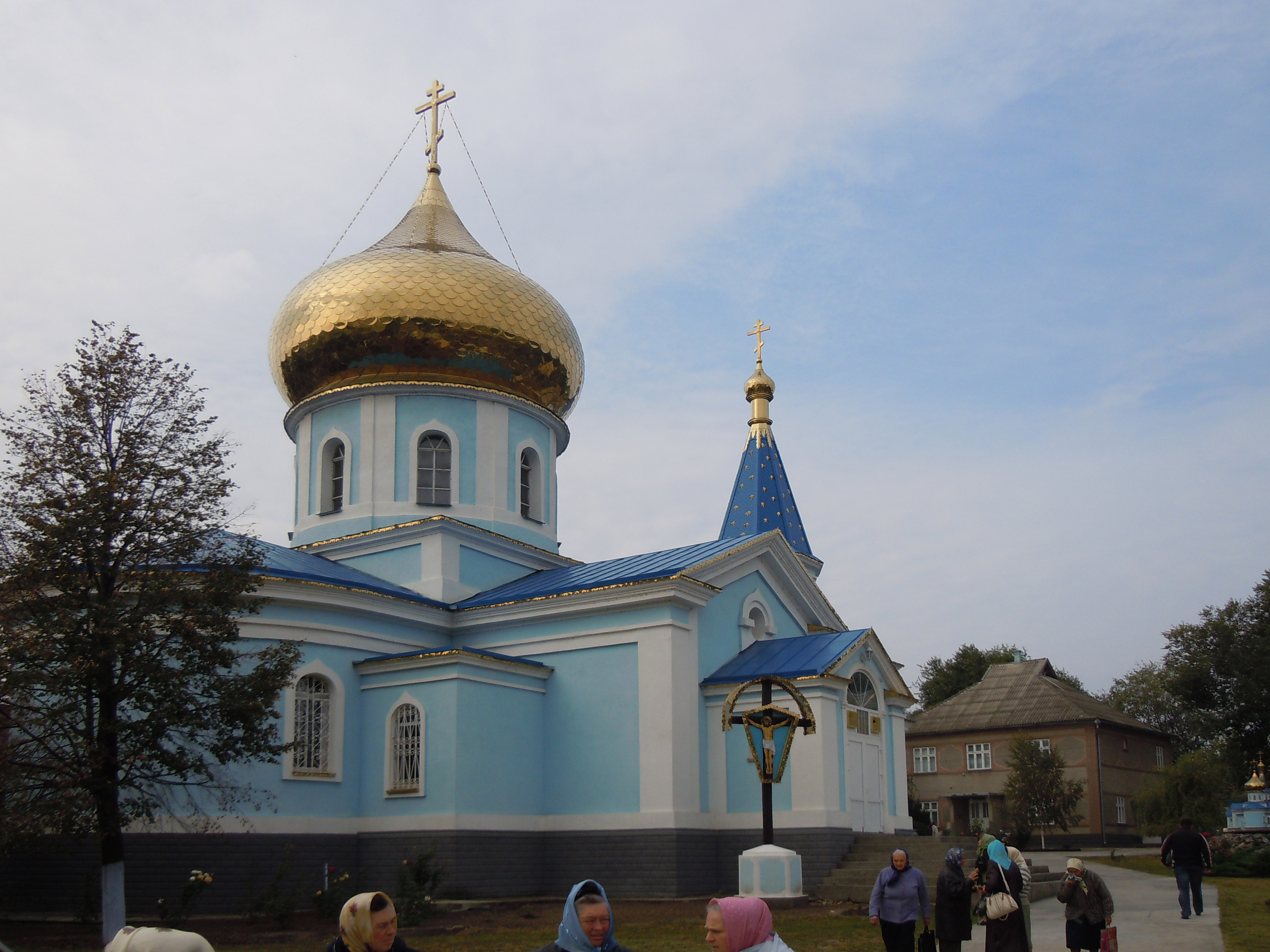
- Dormition Church in Tatarbunary

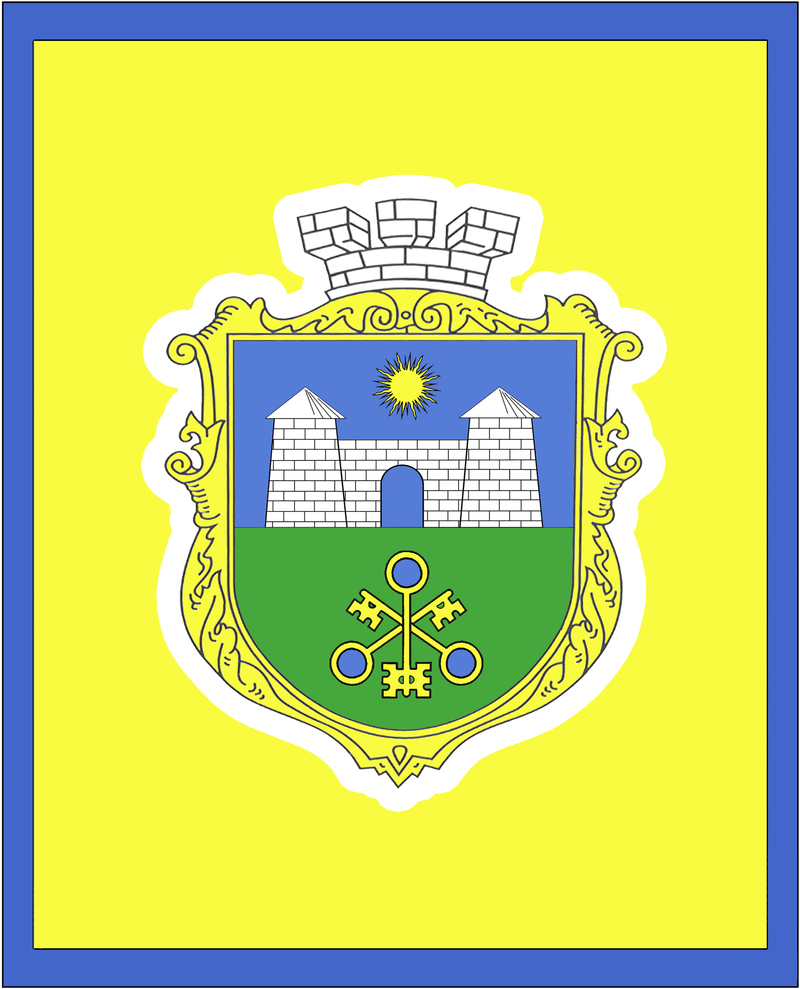
- Flag Coat of arms
- Interactive map of Tatarbunary
- Location within Odesa Oblast Location within Ukraine
- Coordinates: 45°50′25″N 29°36′45″E
- Country: Ukraine
- Oblast: Odesa Oblast
- Hromada: Tatarbunary urban hromada

Government
  - Mayor: Andriy Petrovych Hlushchenko

Area
  - Total: 8.07 km^{2} (3.12 sq mi)
- Elevation: 14 m (46 ft)

Population (2022)
  - Total: 10,836
  - Density: 1,340/km^{2} (3,480/sq mi)
- Time zone: UTC+2 (EET)
  - Summer (DST): UTC+3 (EEST)
- Postal code: 68100-68104
- Area code: +380 4844

Tatarbunary (Ukrainian: Татарбунари, pronounced [tɐtɐrbʊˈnɑrɪ]; Romanian: Tatarbunar; Turkish: Tatarpınarı) is a city in Odesa Oblast (province) of south-western Ukraine. It hosts the administration of Tatarbunary urban hromada, one of the hromadas of Ukraine. Tatarbunary is located north of the Danube Delta, in Budjak area, approximately 100 kilometers (62 mi) south-west of the oblast center, Odesa, close to Sasyk Lagoon. Population: 10,836 (2022 estimate).

The word "Tatarbunary" means "Tatar Wells" in South Slavic languages, with "bunar" borrowed from Turkic "pınar", "well, spring, fountain". The name Tatarbunar is mentioned by Dimitrie Cantemir in his work Descriptio Moldaviae (1714–1716).

== History ==
The settlement appears to have been founded in the 16th century, when the Principality of Moldavia, became dependent of the Ottoman Empire. Later it was annexed by the Russian Empire in 1812 along with Bessarabia (eastern half of the Principality of Moldavia). In the wake of the Russian Revolution, the region was claimed by the Moldavian Democratic Republic, the Ukrainian People's Republic and the Odesa Soviet Republic. Ultimately occupied by Romanian troops in mid February 1918, it formally became part of the Kingdom of Romania in March, after a regional council in Chişinău proclaimed the whole of Bessarabia united with the latter. During 1924, the settlement was the site of a peasants' revolt known as the Tatarbunary Uprising.

In 1940, following Soviet Ultimatum the city and the Budzhak region was transferred to the USSR and incorporated into Ukrainian SSR as Akkerman Oblast. In 1941–44 it was occupied by Romania following the Axis attack on the Soviet Union. During World War II, an Einsatzgruppen massacred the local Jewish population in a mass execution. According to the Yad Vashem database, 121 Jews whose names are listed were killed on that occasion.

In 1978, Tatarbunary obtained city status. It now produces wine and woollen cloth.

Until 18 July 2020, Tatarbunary was the administrative center of Tatarbunary Raion. The raion was abolished in July 2020 as part of the administrative reform of Ukraine, which reduced the number of raions of Odesa Oblast to seven. The area of Tatarbunary Raion was merged into Bilhorod-Dnistrovskyi Raion.

== Environmental issues ==
An assessment in August 2007 highlighted several problems.

=== Drinking water ===
The central water supply serves 60% of the population, drawing water from a depth of 120 metres. The water tastes salty, and the limited capacity means that water is available for only four hours per day. The other 40% of the population use private wells, but the water is dirty and unsuitable for drinking. Many people harvest rainwater, but this is considered unsuitable for drinking and is used for irrigation and washing. People have no choice but to drink processed water from water tanks.

=== Sanitation ===
Some sewage flows untreated into Sasyk Lagoon, others use pit latrines which present a problem because of regular flooding.

=== Pollution ===
The Sasyk Lagoon has become too dangerous for swimming because of pollution, including pesticides and heavy metals. The water is described as greenish with an unpleasant smell.

This follows a Soviet project in the late 1970s, when a dam was built separating Sasyk Lagoon from the Black Sea with the idea of converting the lagoon to a fresh water lake to use for irrigation. However, this failed and the use of water from Sasyk resulted in the salinization of about 30,000 hectares of land, with associated impact on crops, and mineralization of ground water and wells.

Many now favour breaking the dam and reconnecting the lagoon with the sea.

=== Health ===
The rates of cancer in this region are among the highest in Ukraine, especially among children and young adults.

== Demographics ==
Ethnic groups according to the 2001 Ukrainian census:

Ethnic groups in Tatarbunary
	percent
Ukrainians	81.50%
Russians	6.66%
Bulgarians	5.47%
Moldovans	3.82%
Gagauz	0.47%
Belarusians	0.27%

Native languages according to the 2001 Ukrainian census:

Native language in Tatarbunary
	percent
Ukrainian	84.6%
Russian	7.8%
Bulgarian	3.6%
Romanian	2.4%
Gagauz	0.2%
Belarusian	0.1%
others	1.2%

The Ukrainian government currently classifies the Moldovan language as Romanian.

== Gallery ==
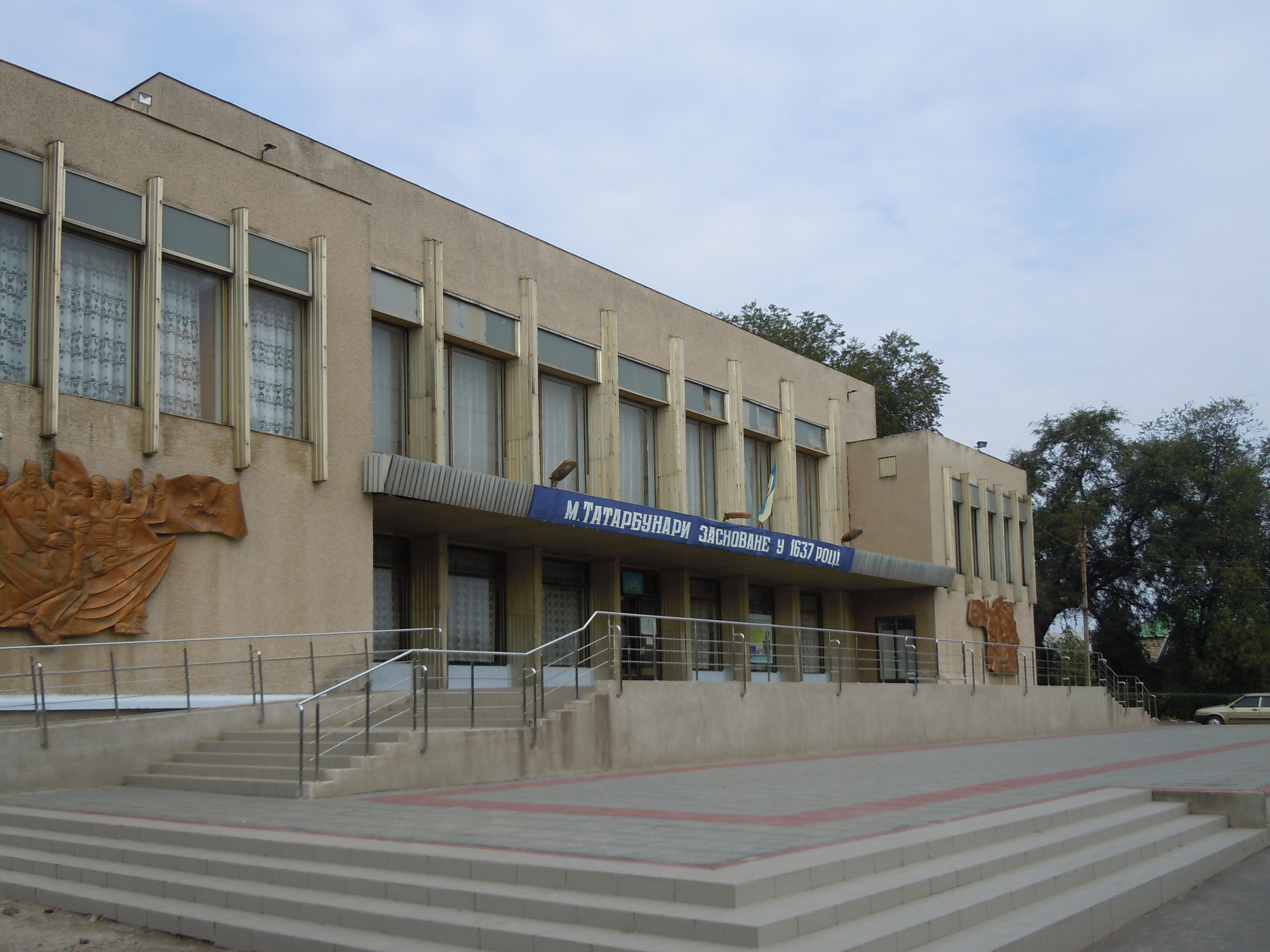
Tatarbunary culture palace

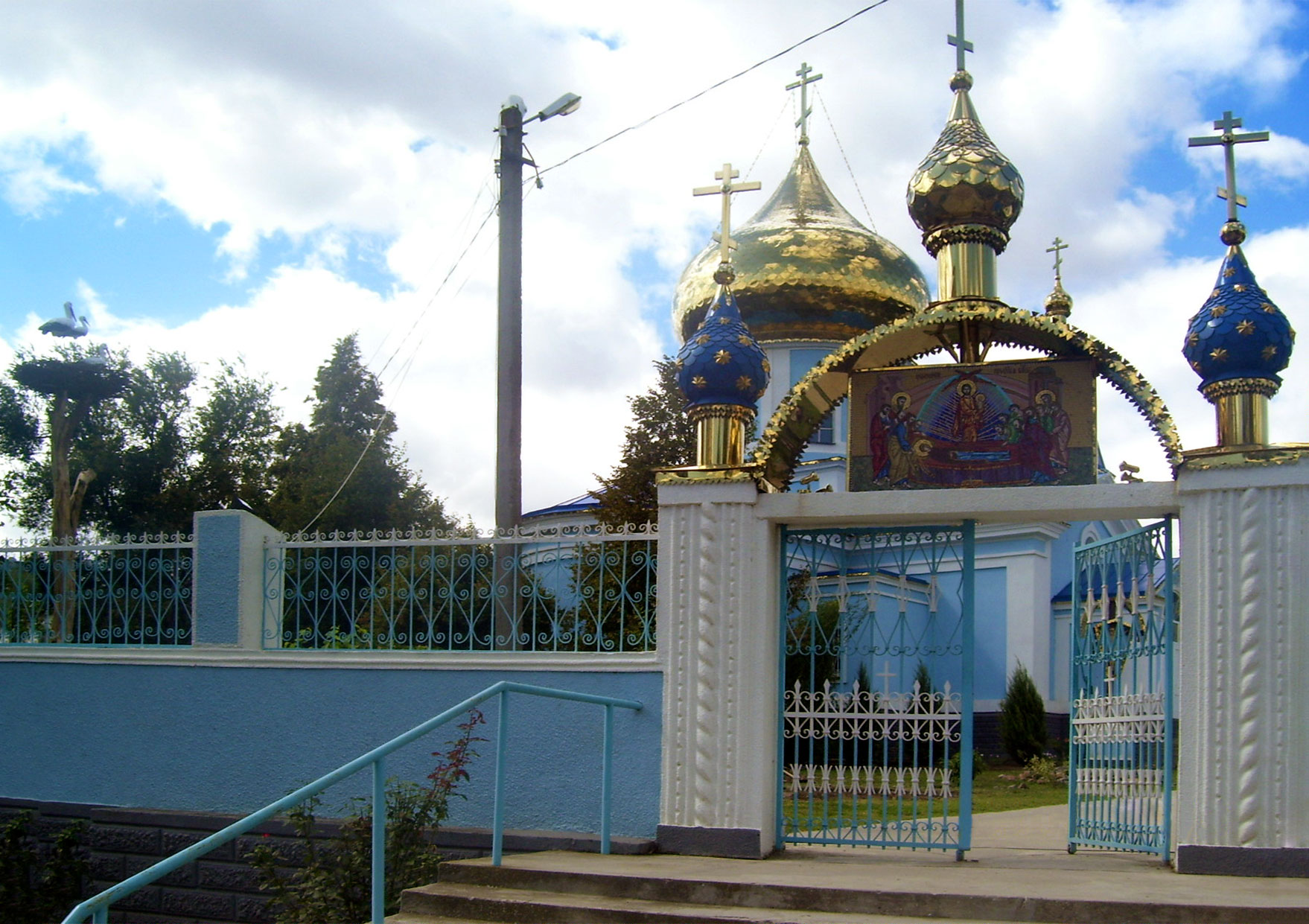
Church of the Dormition

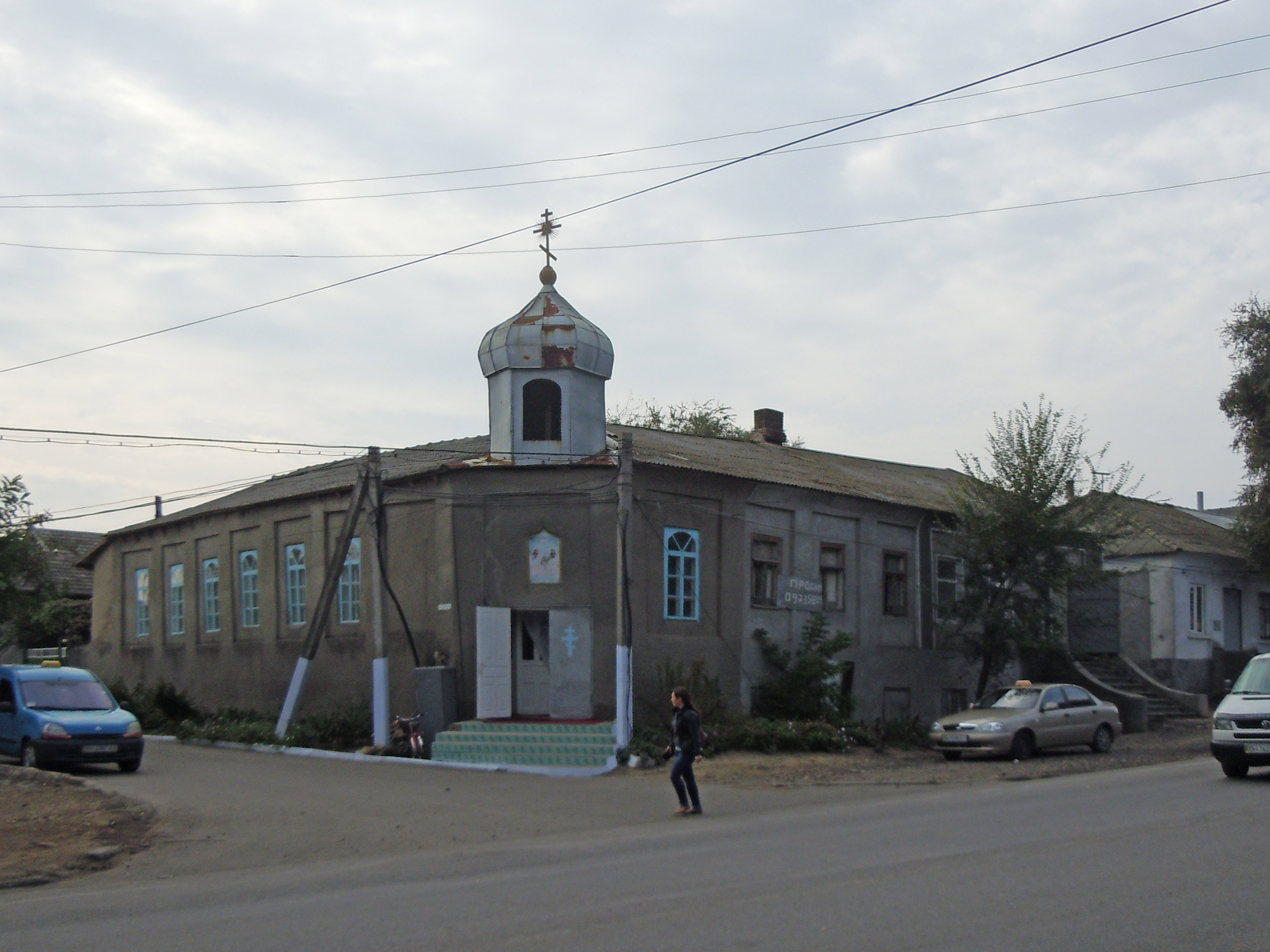
Holy Trinity Church

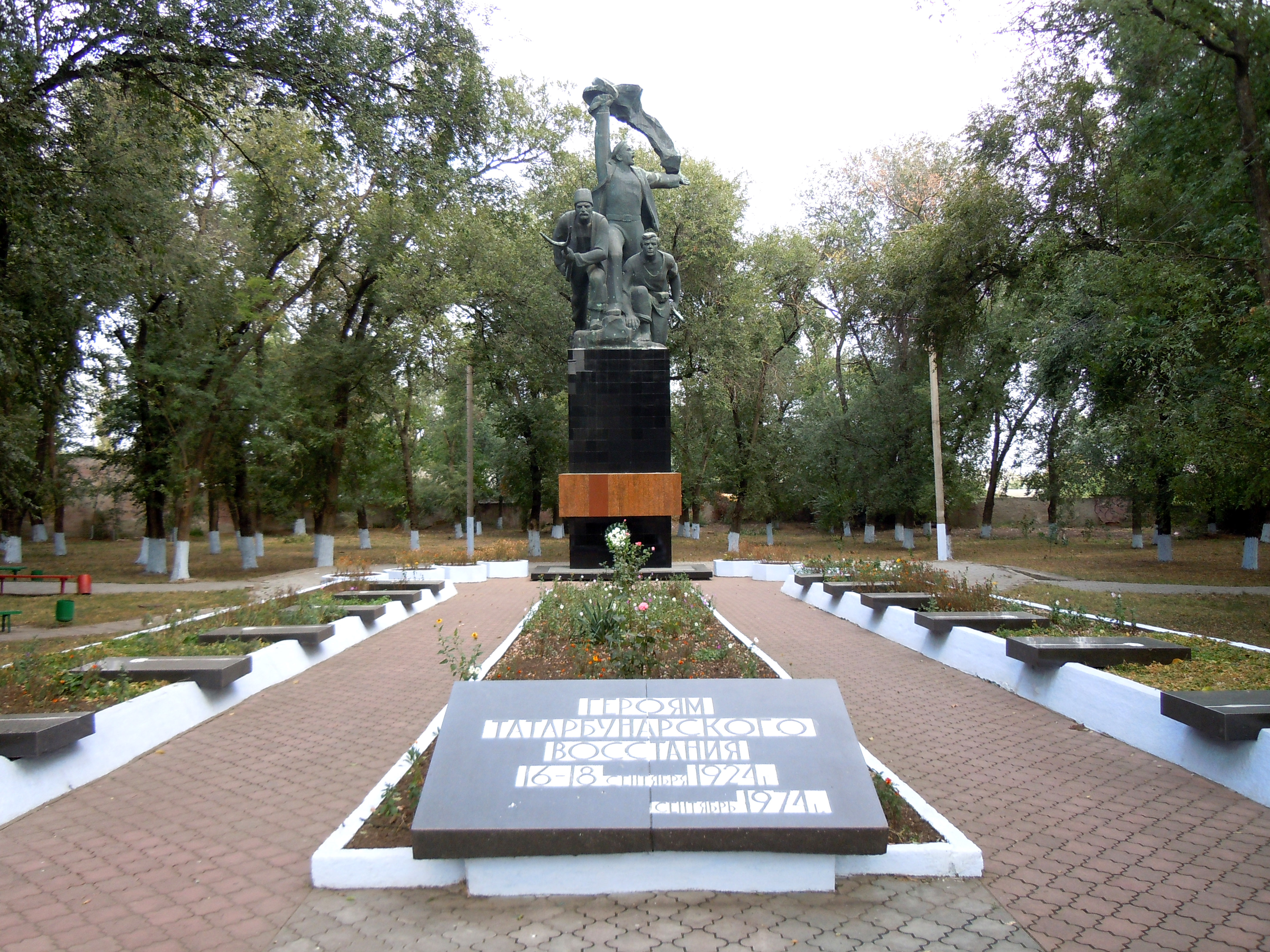
Tatarbunary Uprising monument
