= Bilhorod-Dnistrovskyi Raion =

Subdivision of Odesa Oblast, Ukraine

Bilhorod-Dnistrovskyi Raion Білгород-Дністровський район
- Raion
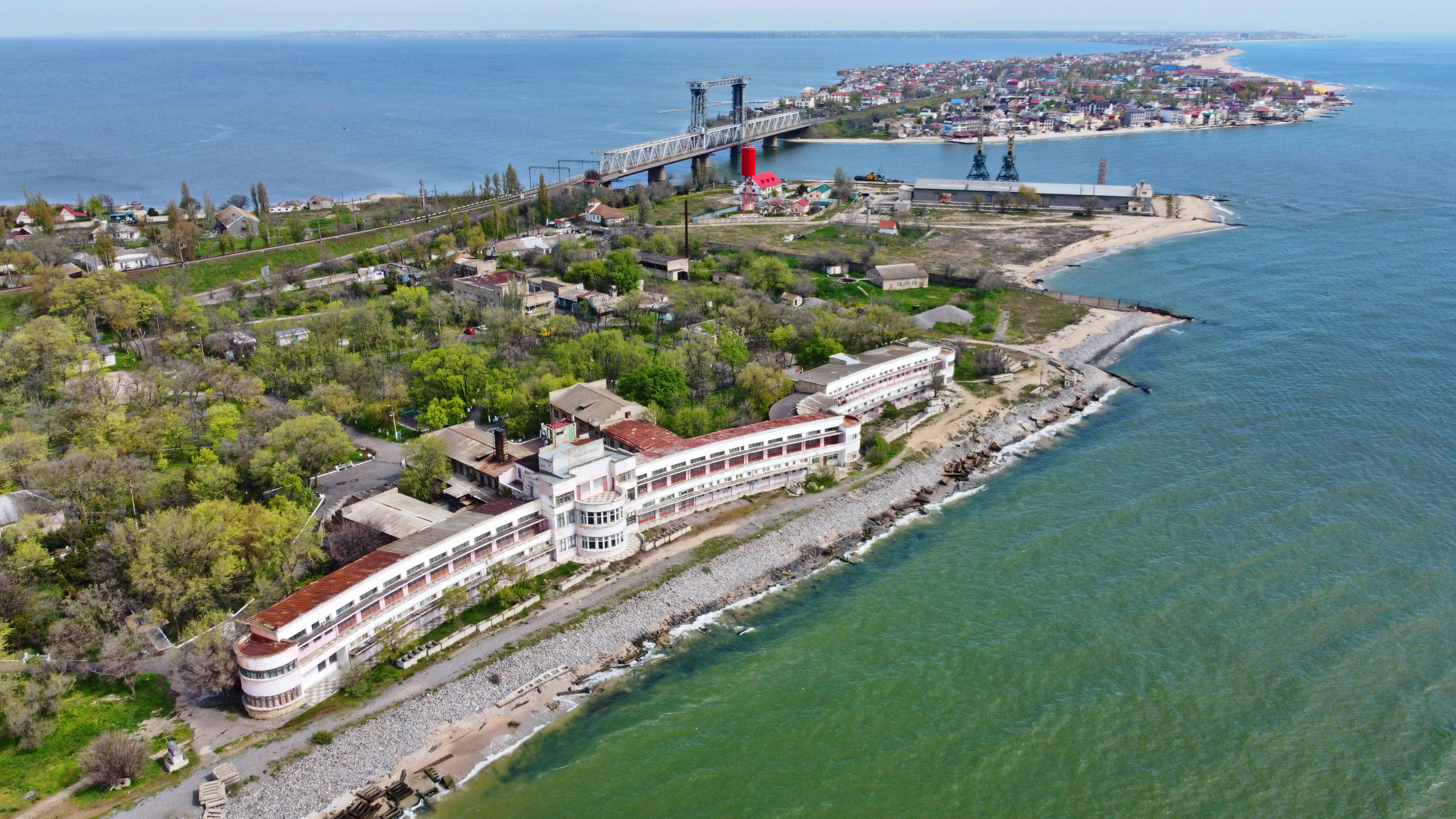

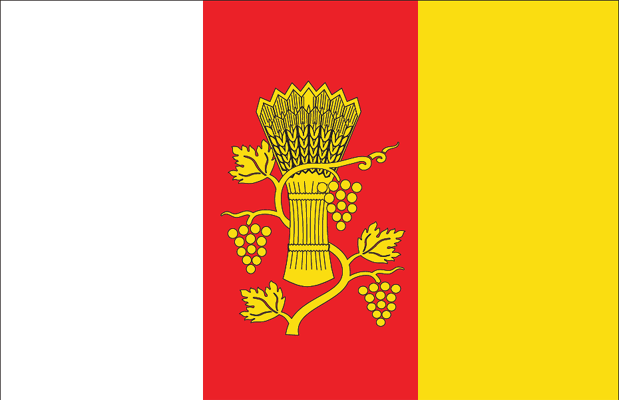
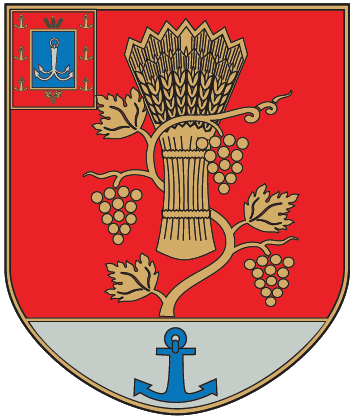
- Flag Coat of arms
- Interactive map of Bilhorod-Dnistrovskyi Raion
- Coordinates: 46°10′N 30°10′E
- Country: Ukraine
- Oblast: Odesa Oblast
- Established: 1957
- Admin. center: Bilhorod-Dnistrovskyi
- Subdivisions: 16 hromadas

Government
  - Governor: Vasyl Chornolutskiy

Area: since July 2020
  - Total: 5,154.98 km^{2} (1,990.35 sq mi)

Population (2022)
  - Total: 196,618
  - Density: 38.1414/km^{2} (98.7857/sq mi)
- Time zone: UTC+2 (EET)
  - Summer (DST): UTC+3 (EEST)
- Postal index: 67720—67798
- Area code: +380 4849
- Website: https://bd-rda.od.gov.ua/

Bilhorod-Dnistrovskyi Raion (Ukrainian: Білгород-Дністровський район; Romanian: Raionul Cetatea Albă) is a raion (district) in Odesa Oblast of Ukraine. It is part of the historical region of Bessarabia. Its administrative center is the town of Bilhorod-Dnistrovskyi. Population: 196,618 (2022 estimate).

On 18 July 2020, as part of the administrative reform of Ukraine, the number of raions of Odesa Oblast was reduced to seven, and the area of Bilhorod-Dnistrovskyi Raion was significantly expanded. Two abolished raions, Sarata and Tatarbunary Raions, as well as Bilhorod-Dnistrovskyi Municipality and part of Ovidiopol Raion, were merged into Bilhorod-Dnistrovskyi Raion. The January 2020 estimate of the raion population was 59,349 (2020 est.).

== Administrative division ==
=== Current ===
After the reform in July 2020, the raion consisted of 16 hromadas:

- Bilhorod-Dnistrovskyi urban hromada with the administration in the city of Bilhorod-Dnistrovskyi, transferred from Bilhorod-Dnistrovskyi Municipality;
- Dyvisiia rural hromada with the administration in the village of Dyvisiia, transferred from Tatarbunary Raion;
- Karolino-Buhaz rural hromada with the administration in the village of Karolino-Buhaz, transferred from Ovidiopol Raion;
- Kulevcha rural hromada with the administration in the village of Kulevcha, transferred from Sarata Raion;
- Lyman rural hromada with the administration in the village of Lyman, transferred from Tatarbunary Raion;
- Marazliivka rural hromada with the administration in the village of Marazliivka, retained from Bilhorod-Dnistrovskyi Raion;
- Moloha rural hromada with the administration in the village of Moloha, retained from Bilhorod-Dnistrovskyi Raion;
- Petropavlivka rural hromada with the administration in the village of Petropavlivka, transferred from Sarata Raion;
- Plakhtiivka rural hromada with the administration in the village of Plakhtiivka, transferred from Sarata Raion;
- Sarata settlement hromada with the administration in the rural settlement of Sarata, transferred from Sarata Raion;
- Serhiivka settlement hromada with the administration in the rural settlement of Serhiivka, retained from Bilhorod-Dnistrovskyi Raion and Bilhorod-Dnistrovskyi Municipality;
- Shabo rural hromada with the administration in the village of Shabo, retained from Bilhorod-Dnistrovskyi Raion;
- Starokozache rural hromada with the administration in the village of Starokozache, retained from Bilhorod-Dnistrovskyi Raion;
- Tatarbunary urban hromada with the administration in the city of Tatarbunary, transferred from Tatarbunary Raion;
- Tuzly rural hromada with the administration in the village of Tuzly, transferred from Tatarbunary Raion;
- Uspenivka rural hromada with the administration in the village of Uspenivka, transferred from Sarata Raion.

The Village of Krutoyarivka (Moldova in Romanian) in the Starokozache rural hromada had a population of 1,933, out of which 1,820 spoke Romanian (94.15%), including 1,792 who called the language "Moldovan" (92.71%) and 28 who declared the language to be "Romanian" (1.45%), while 25 spoke Ukrainian (1.29%) and 84 Russian (4.35%).

=== Before 2020 ===
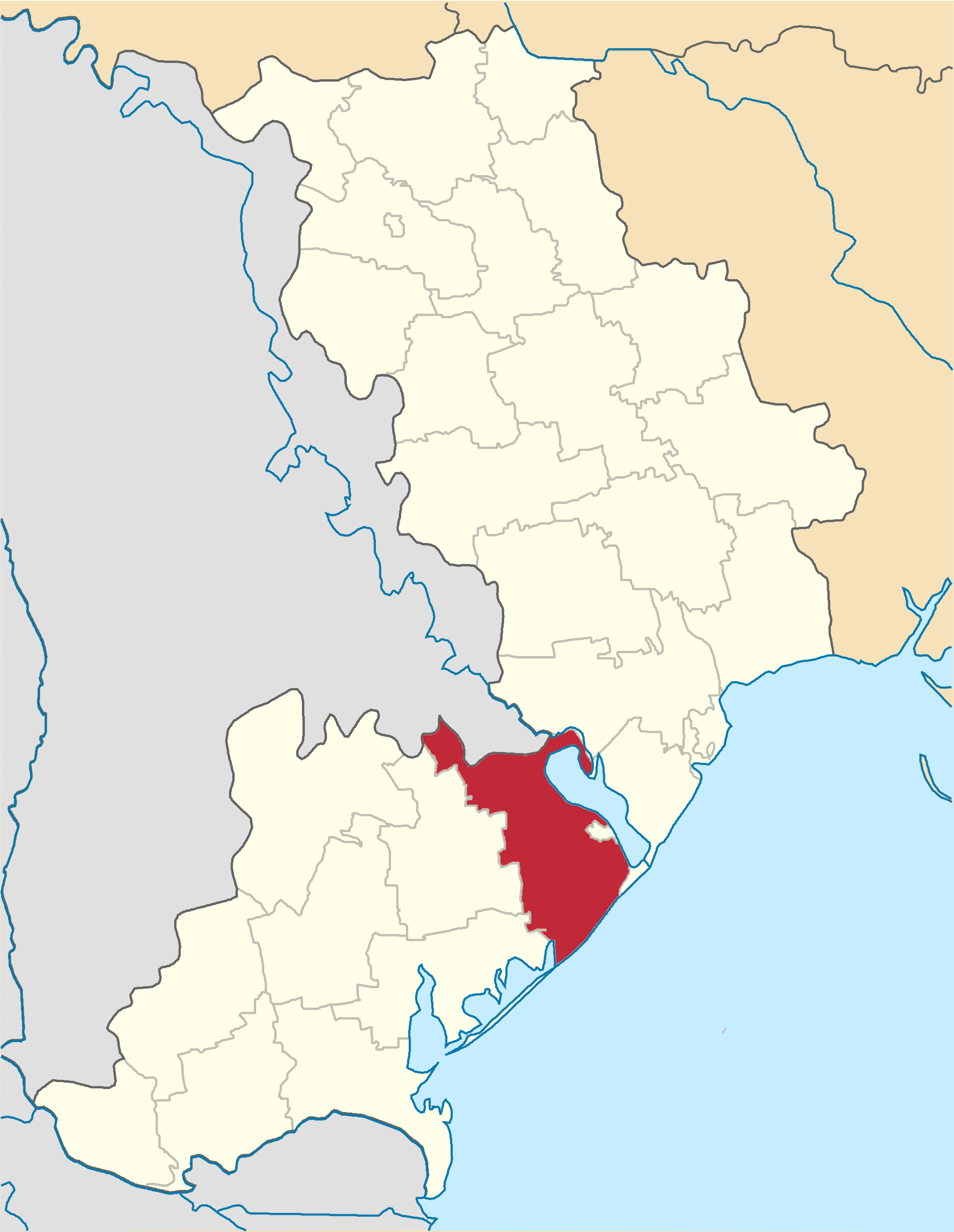
Bilhorod-Dnistrovskyi Raion in Odesa Oblast (1966-2020)

Before the 2020 reform, the raion consisted of five hromadas,

- Marazliivka rural hromada with the administration in Marazliivka;
- Moloha rural hromada with the administration in Moloha;
- Serhiivka settlement hromada with the administration in Serhiivka (partially in Bilhorod-Dnistrovskyi Municipality);
- Shabo rural hromada with the administration in Shabo;
- Starokozache rural hromada with the administration in Starokozache.
