= Administrative divisions of Khmelnytskyi Oblast =

Khmelnytskyi Oblast Хмельницька область
- Oblast
- Flag Coat of arms

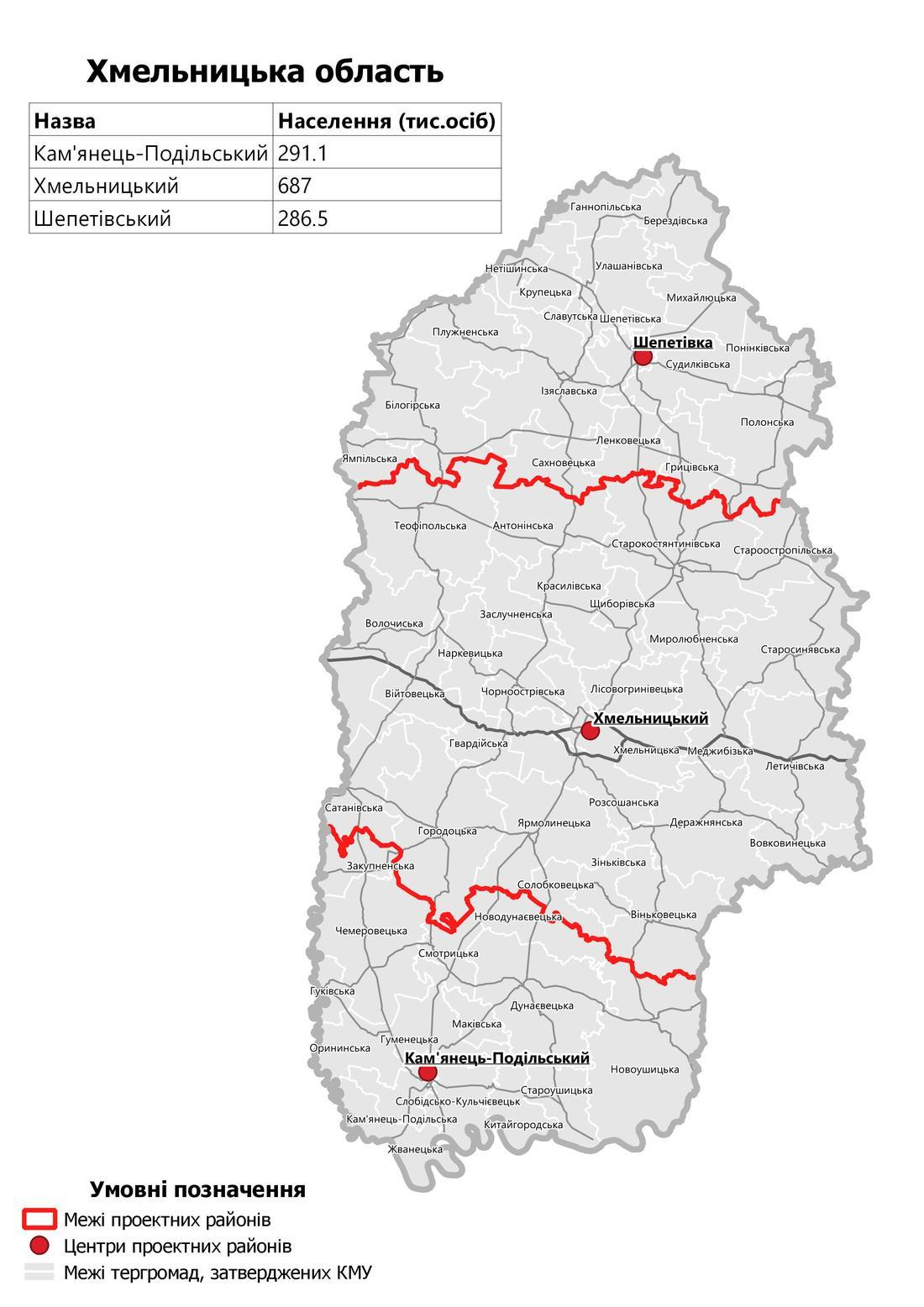
- Country: Ukraine
- Administrative center: Khmelnytskyi
- Administrative divisions: List: 3 districts; 60 hromadas
- Statistics dated 1 January 2021

The administrative divisions of Khmelnytskyi Oblast (Ukrainian: Хмельницька область) follows the general scheme of the administrative divisions in Ukraine. It is subdivided into districts (raions) which are subdivided into territorial communities (hromadas). As Ukraine is a unitary state, any changes to the administrative divisions have to be approved by the Verkhovna Rada.

The oblast was established on 22 September 1937, as the "Kamianets-Podilskyi Oblast" to replace the Kamianets Okruha and other neighboring administrative regions in the Ukrainian Soviet Socialist Republic. Its administrative center was moved from Kamianets-Podilskyi to Proskuriv in 1941, and when Proskuriv's name was changed to Khmelnytskyi, the oblast's name was changed as well.

Khmelnytskyi Oblast is one of the smaller of the 24 oblasts of Ukraine with a total area of 20,629 square kilometres (7,965 mi^{2}). Its population was 1,426,649 at the 2001 census. The oblast borders upon Rivne Oblast to the northwest, Zhytomyr Oblast to the northeast, Vinnytsia Oblast to the east, Chernivtsi Oblast to the south, and Ternopil Oblast to the west.

The oblast has three raions, that are further divided into 60 hromadas.

== Current ==
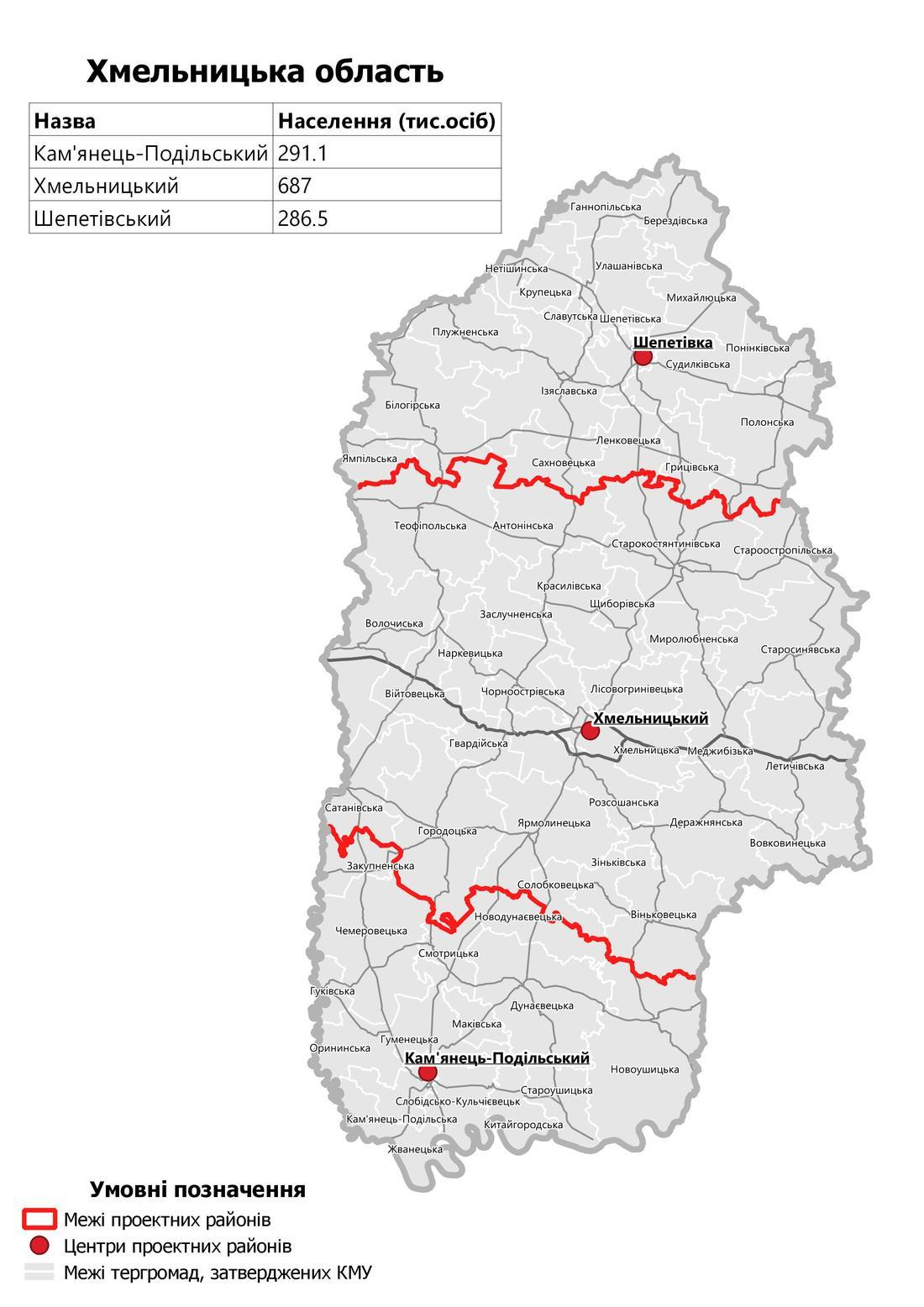
Raions of Khmelnytskyi Oblast as of August 2020.

On 18 July 2020, the number of districts was reduced to three. These are:

1. Kamianets-Podilskyi (Кам'янець-Подільський район), the center is in the town of Kamianets-Podilskyi;
2. Khmelnytskyi (Хмельницький район), the center is in the city of Khmelnytskyi;
3. Shepetivka (Шепетівський район), the center is in the town of Shepetivka.

**Khmelnytskyi Oblast**
As of 1 January 2022
Number of districts (райони)	3
Number of hromadas (громади)	60

=== Communities (hromadas) per District (raion) ===
In bold are communities (hromadas) with cities

Kamianets-Podilskyi Raion

- Chemerivtsi
- Hukiv
- Humentsi
- **Dunayivtsi**
- **Kamianets-Podilskyi**
- Kytaihorod
- Makiv
- Nova Uzhytisa
- Novo-Dunayivtsi
- Orynyn
- Slobidka-Kulchiyevetska
- Smotrych
- Stara Ushytsia
- Zakupne
- Zhvanets

Khmelnytskyi Raion

- Antoniny
- Chornyi Ostriv
- **Horodok**
- Hvardiyske
- **Derazhnia**
- **Khmelnytskyi**
- **Krasyliv**
- Letychiv
- Lisovi Hrynivtsi
- Medzhybizh
- Myroliubne
- Narkevychi
- Rozsosha
- Sataniv
- Shchyborivka
- Solobkivtsi
- Stara Syniava
- **Starokostiantyniv**
- Staryi Ostropil
- Teofipol
- Vinkivtsi
- Viytivtsi
- **Volochysk**
- Vovkovyntsi
- Yarmolyntsi
- Zasluchne
- Zinkiv

Shepetivka Raion

- Berezdiv
- Bilohirya
- Hannopil
- Hrytsiv
- **Iziaslav**
- Krupets
- Lenkivtsi
- Mykhailiuchka
- **Netishyn**
- Pluzhne
- **Polonne**
- Poninka
- Sakhnivtsi
- **Shepetivka**
- **Slavuta**
- Sudylkiv
- Ulashanivka
- Yampil

== Administrative divisions before 2020 ==
Before July 2020, the Khmelnytskyi Oblast was administratively divided into 20 districts (райони), which served as the second level of administrative division in the country. It had a total of 13 cities, six of which are under the oblast's jurisdiction (including its administrative center Khmelnytskyi) and seven which are under their raion's jurisdiction.

District	Area (km²)	Population (2012)	Administrative center	Urban-type settlements	Rural municipalities	Villages	Settlements
Bilohiria Raion	776	28,128	Bilohiria	Bilohiria; Yampil	23	72	—
Chemerivtsi Raion	930	42,722	Chemerivtsi	Chemerivtsi; Zakupne	33	68	—
Derazhnia Raion	910	32,955	Derazhnia	Lozove; Vovkovyntsi	22	59	—
Dunaivtsi Raion	1,180	64,422	Dunaivtsi	Dunaivtsi; Smotrych	43	83	—
Horodok Raion	1,110	49,939	Horodok	Sataniv	29	71	1
Iziaslav Raion	1,250	46,059	Iziaslav	—	29	91	—
Kamianets-Podilskyi Raion	1,537	67,900	Kamianets-Podilskyi	Stara Ushytsia	42	120	1
Khmelnytskyi Raion	1,220	52,906	Khmelnytskyi	Chornyi Ostriv	38	76	1
Krasyliv Raion	1,180	53,814	Krasyliv	Antoniny	35	93	—
Letychiv Raion	951	29,209	Letychiv	Letychiv; Medzhybizh	19	55	—
Nova Ushytsia Raion	853	30,271	Nova Ushytsia	Nova Ushytsia	21	57	1
Polonne Raion	866	45,813	Polonne	Poninka	17	44	1
Shepetivka Raion	1,160	34,724	Shepetivka	Hrytsiv	22	68	—
Slavuta Raion	1,162	30,743	Slavuta	—	36	79	—
Starokostiantyniv Raion	1,210	30,448	Starokostiantyniv	—	30	97	—
Stara Syniava Raion	662	21,276	Stara Syniava	Stara Syniava	15	44	—
Teofipol Raion	716	27,831	Teofipol	Teofipol; Bazaliia	22	53	—
Vinkivtsi Raion	653	25,630	Vinkivtsi	Vinkivtsi	17	35	—
Volochysk Raion	1,103	53,113	Volochysk	Narkevychi; Viitivtsi	40	85	—
Yarmolyntsi Raion	898	31,599	Yarmolyntsi	Yarmolyntsi	29	59	—

== Populated settlements ==
=== Cities ===
Khmelnytskyi Oblast has a total of 13 cities, with six of them governed under the oblast's jurisdiction (міста обласного значення), and the remaining seven under their respective district's jurisdiction (міста районного значення). Each urban locality also administers their own respective municipality, which can have a few villages and settlements under its jurisdiction. The combined urban population of the cities and urban-type settlements was 723,431 in 2001.

==== Cities under oblast jurisdiction ====
- Kamianets-Podilskyi
- Khmelnytskyi (administrative center)
- Netishyn
- Slavuta
- Shepetivka
- Starokostiantyniv

==== Cities under raion jurisdiction ====
- Derazhnia
- Dunaivtsi
- Horodok
- Iziaslav
- Krasyliv
- Polonne
- Volochysk

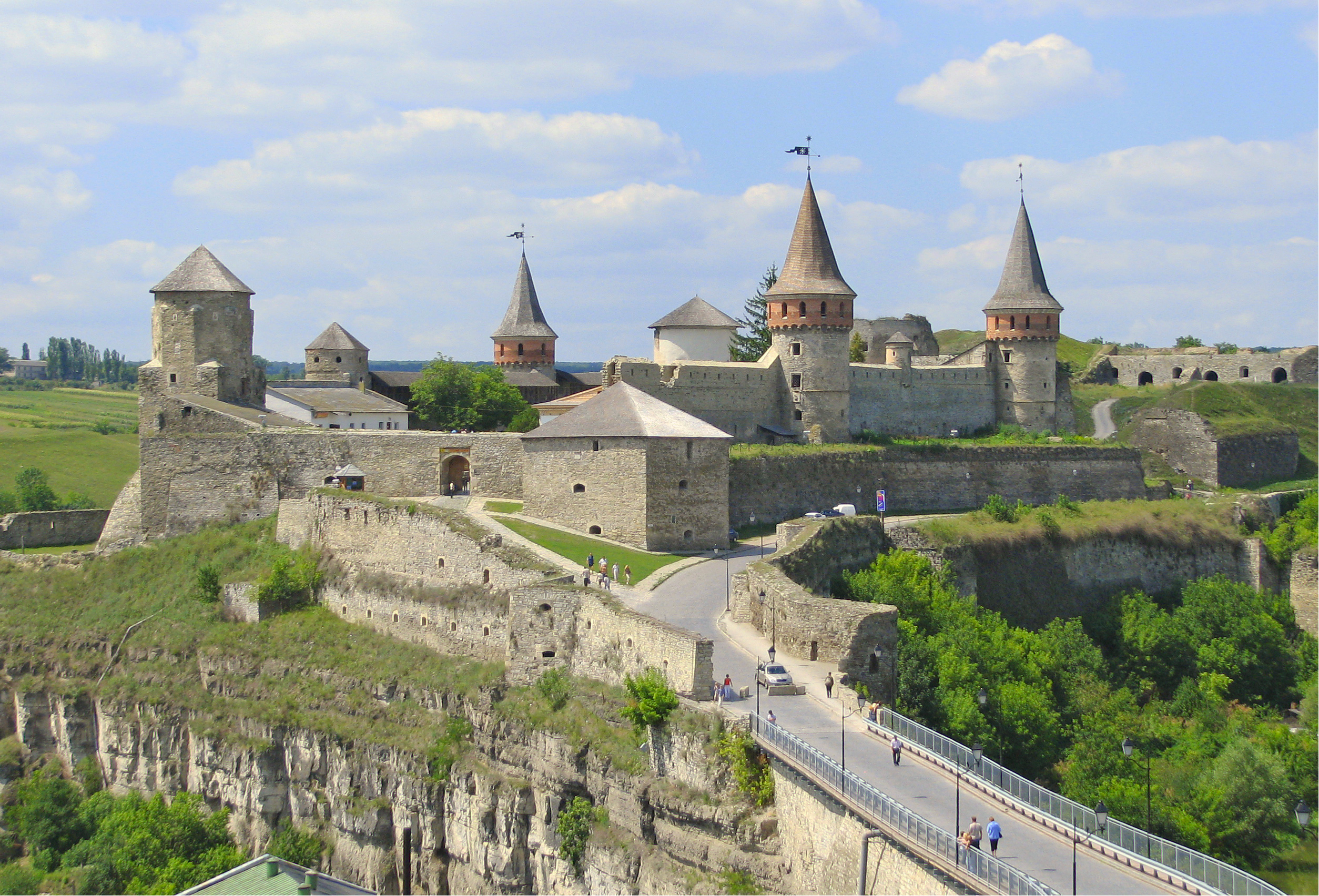
Kamianets-Podilskyi

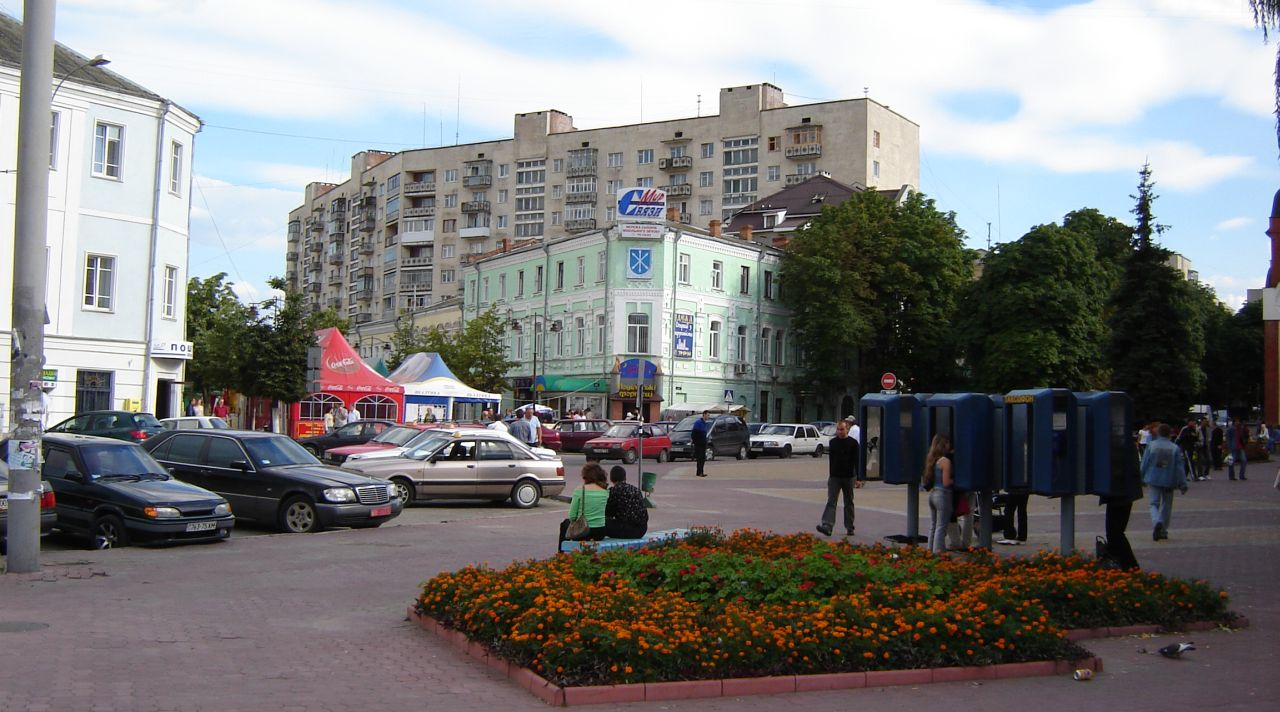
Khmelnytskyi

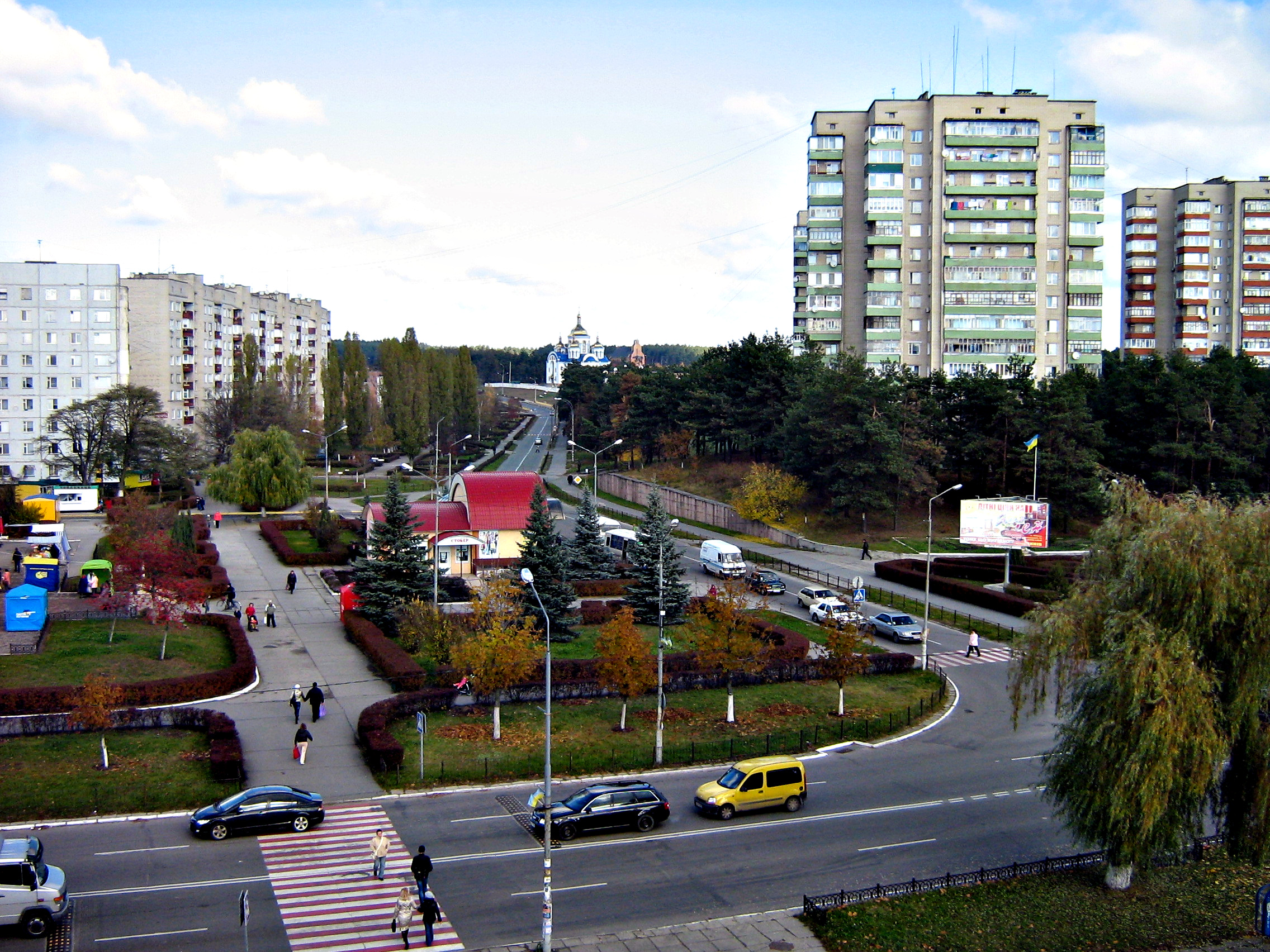
Netishyn

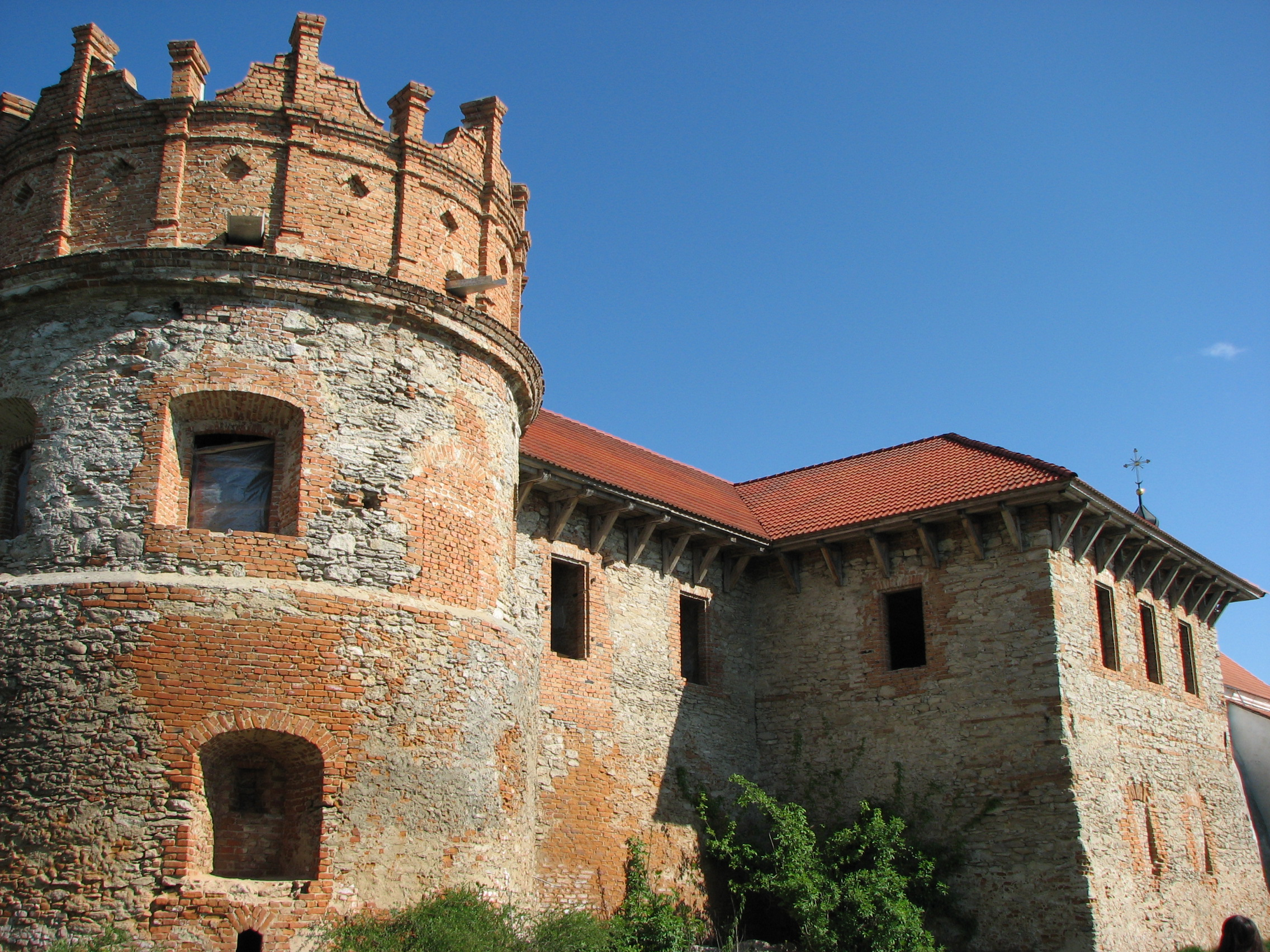
Starokostiantyniv

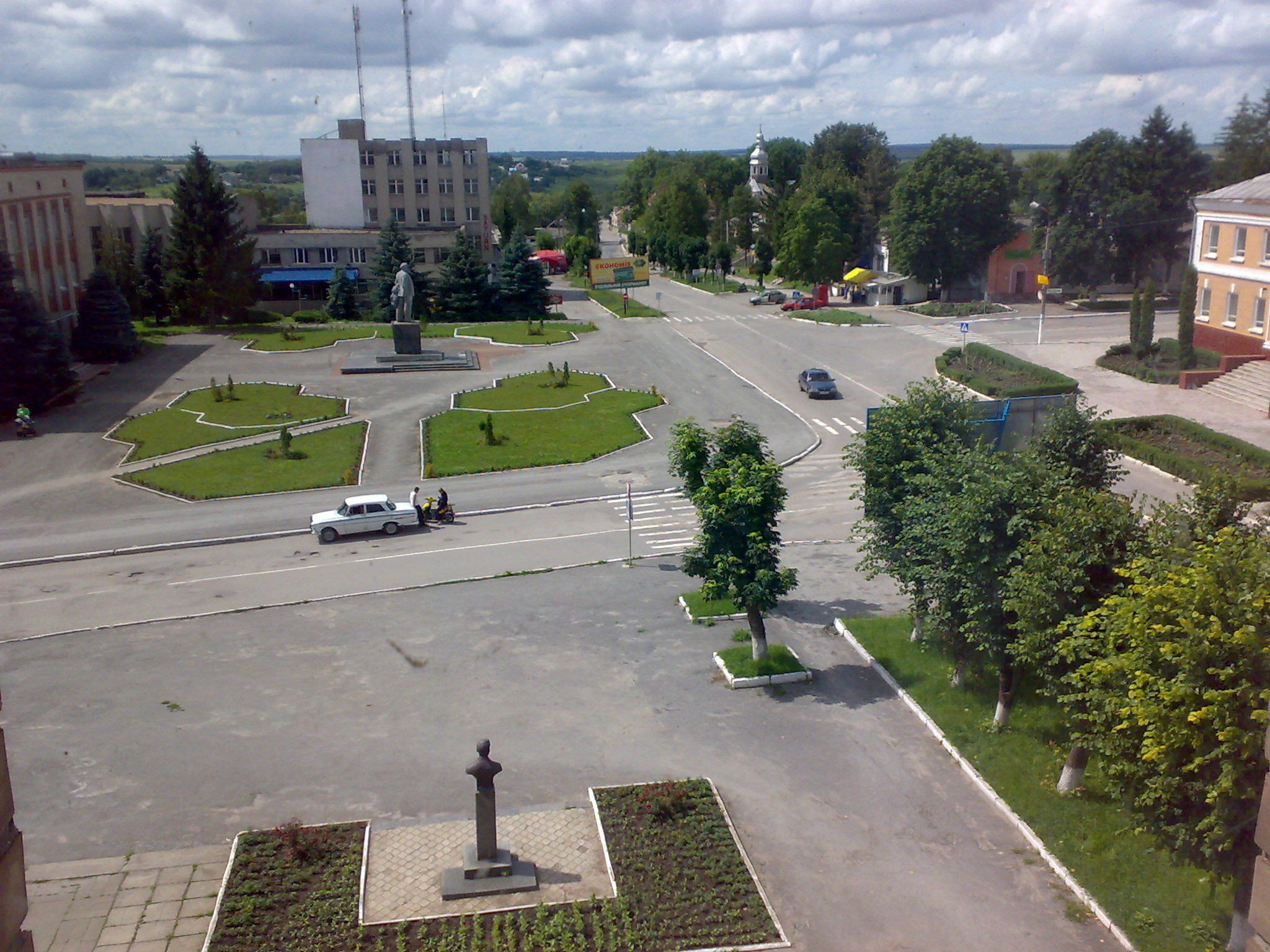
Dunaivtsi

=== Urban-type settlements ===
Khmelnytskyi Oblast has a total of 24 urban-type settlements (селищ міського типу). Each urban locality also administers their own respective municipality, which can have a few villages and settlements under its jurisdiction.

- Antoniny
- Bazaliia
- Bilohiria
- Chemerivtsi
- Chornyi Ostriv
- Hrytsiv
- Dunaivtsi
- Letychiv
- Lozove
- Medzhybizh
- Narkevychi
- Nova Ushytsia
- Poninka
- Sataniv
- Smotrych
- Stara Syniava
- Stara Ushytsia
- Teofipol
- Vinkivtsi
- Viitivtsi
- Vovkovyntsi
- Yampil
- Yarmolyntsi
- Zakupne

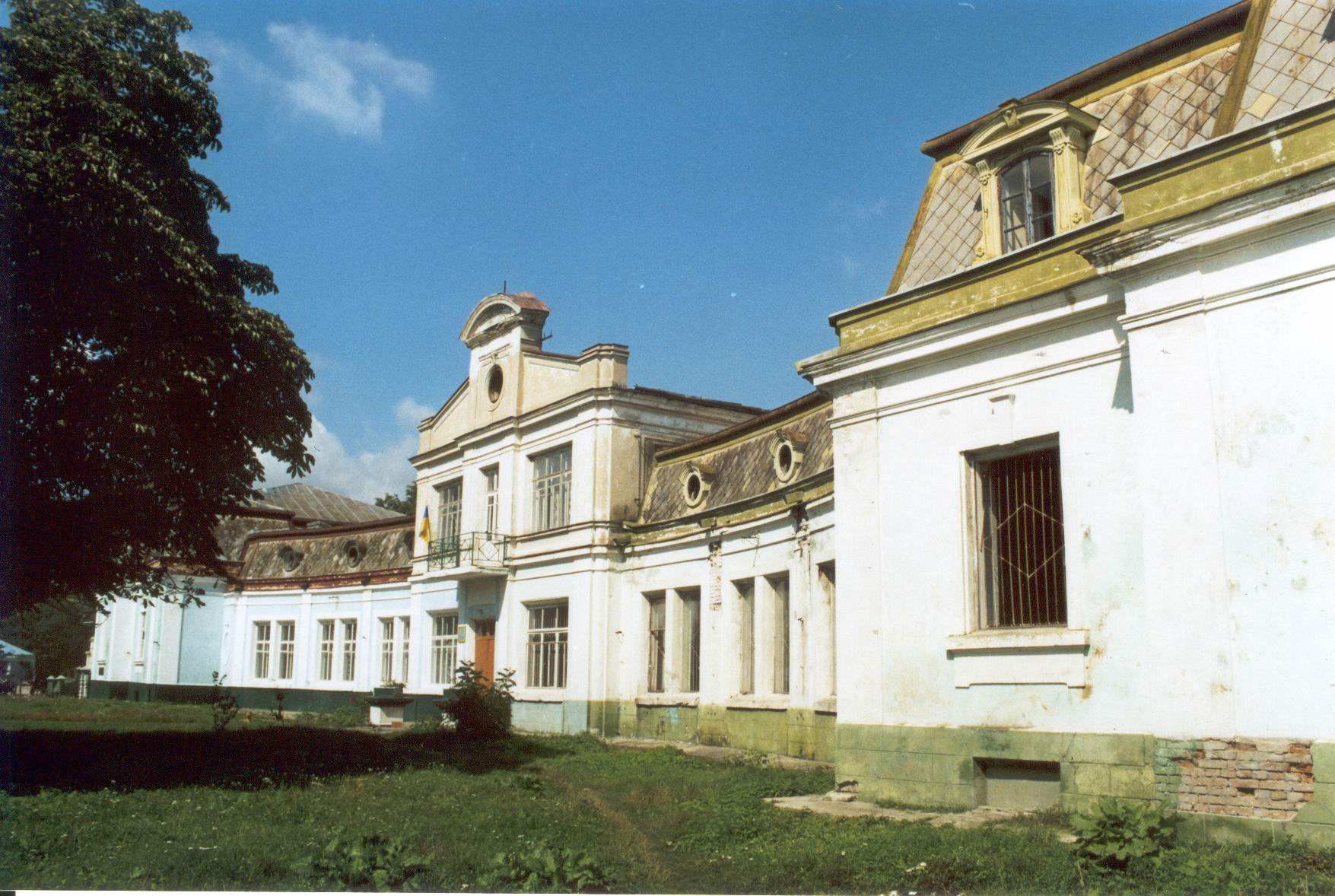
Antoniny

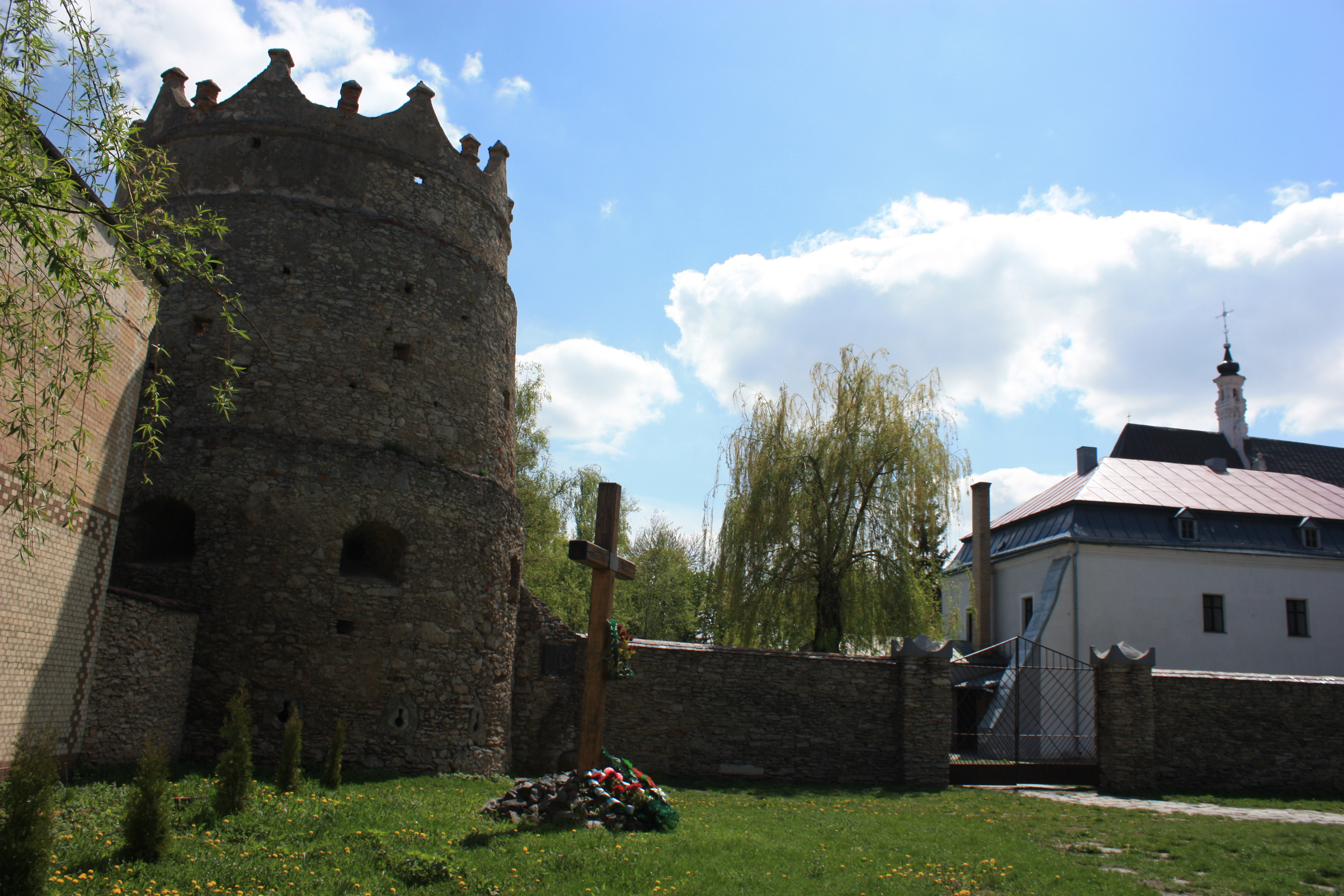
Letychiv

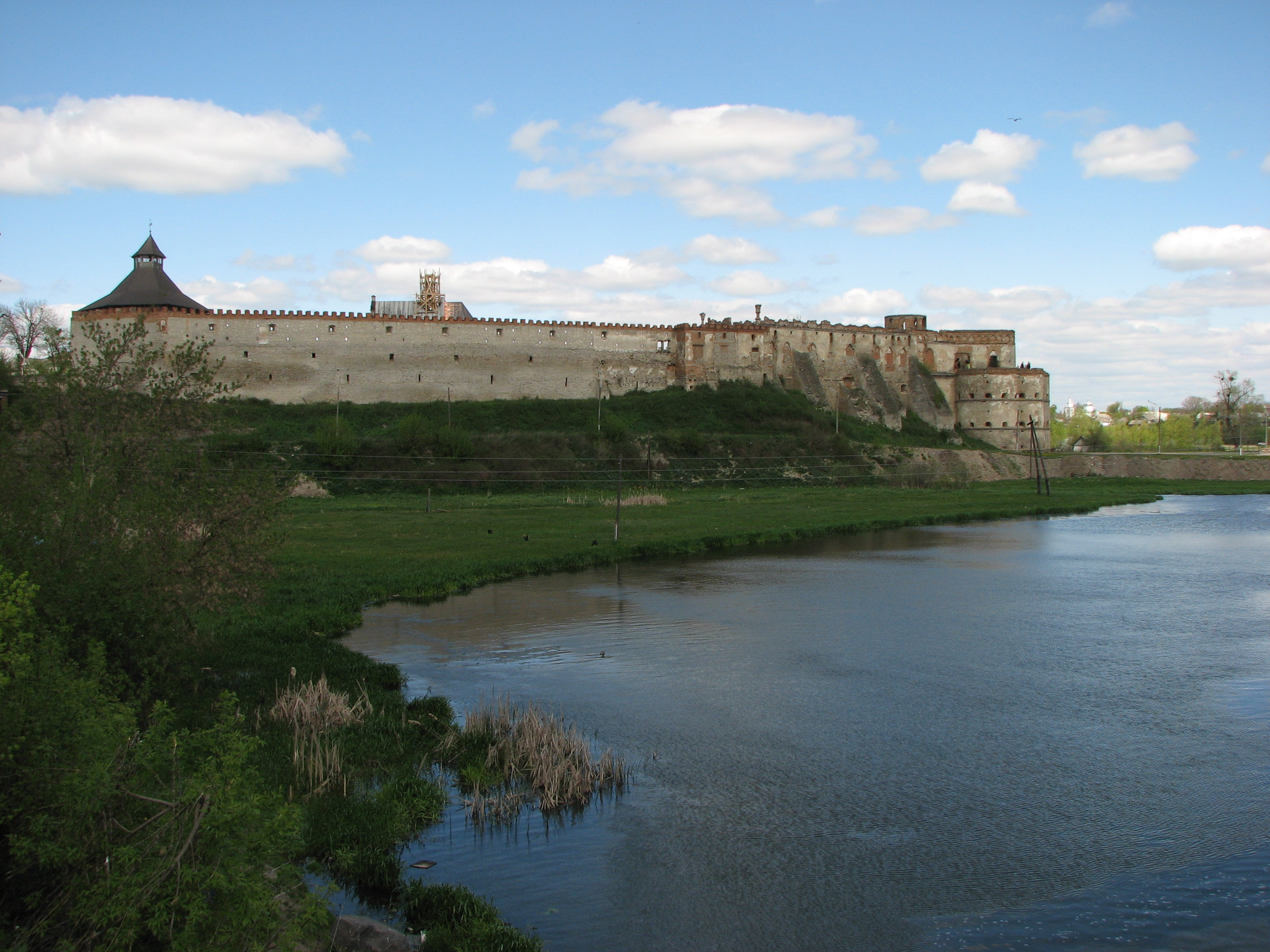
Medzhybizh

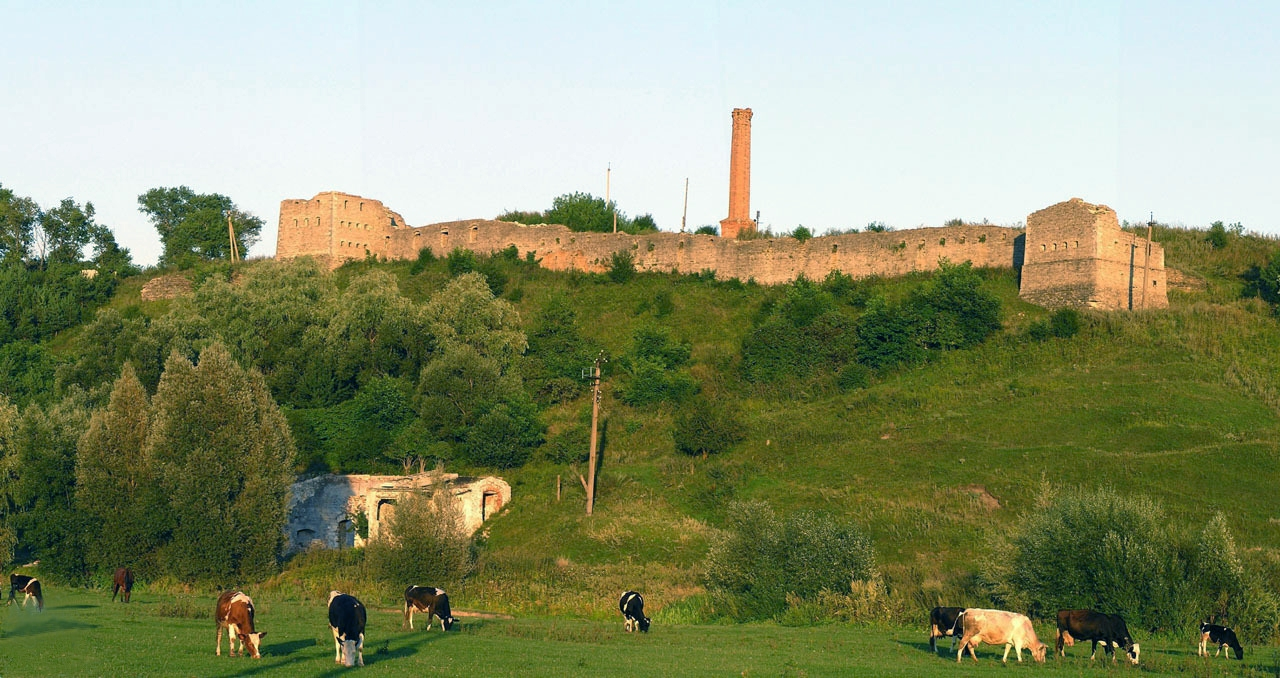
Sataniv

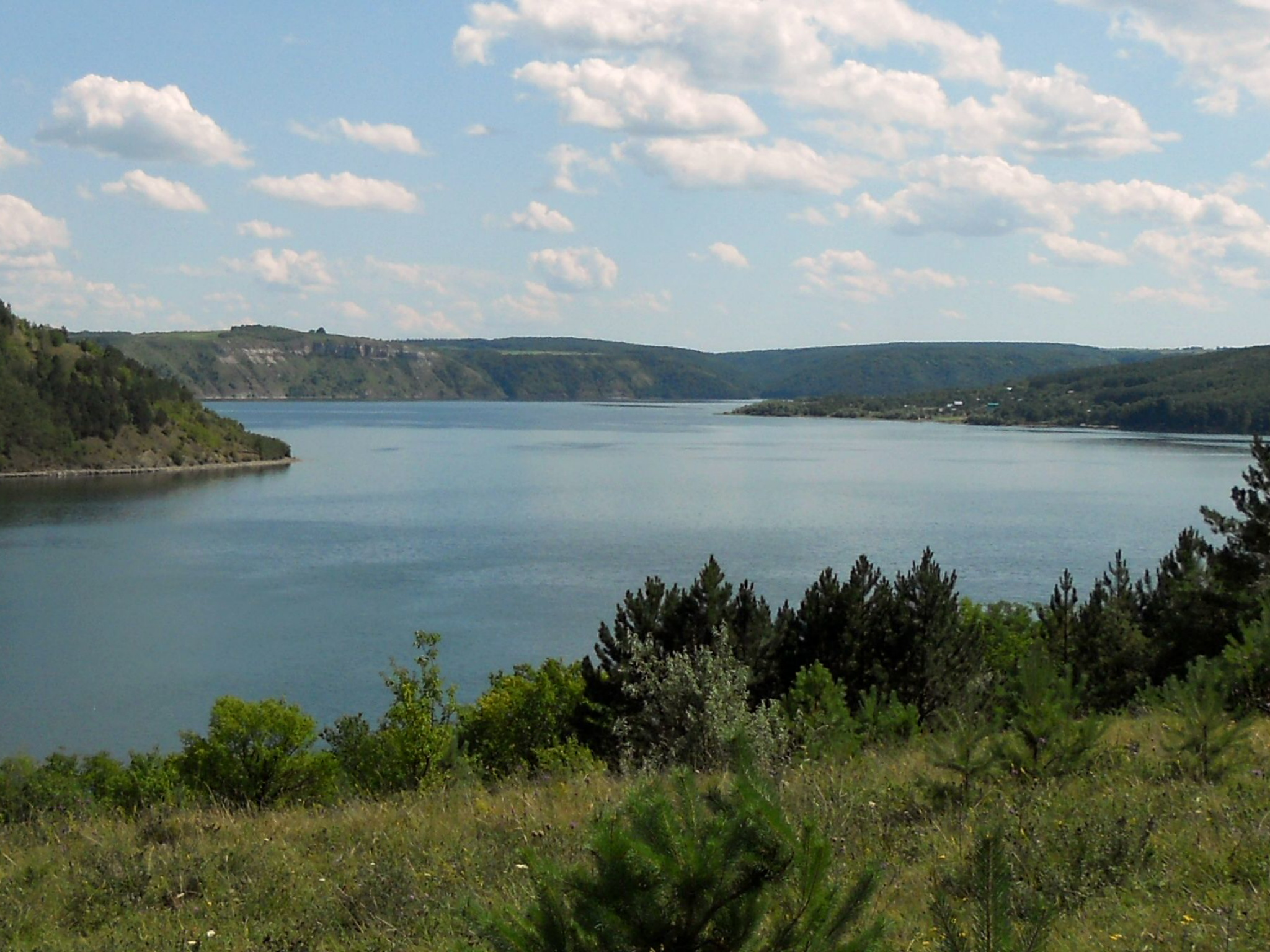
Stara Ushytsia

=== Villages ===
Khmelnytskyi Oblast has a total of 1,409 villages (сіл) and five settlements (селищ). Out of the 1,409 villages, 568 villages administer their own rural municipality (сільських рад) which may have a few other villages under its jurisdiction. The combined rural population of the villages and settlements was 703,218 in 2001.

== See also ==
- Administrative divisions of Ukraine
- Volhynia, a historical region in the oblast's northern part
- Podolia, a historical region in the oblast's southern part
