= Ushytsia =

Ushytsia can refer to:

- Stara Ushytsia, an urban-type settlement in the Kamianets-Podilskyi Raion of Khmelnytskyi Oblast in Ukraine
- Nova Ushytsia, an urban-type settlement in the Kamianets-Podilskyi Raion of Khmelnytskyi Oblast
- Nova Ushytsia Raion, a former district of the Khmelnytskyi Oblast
- Ushytsia (river), a tributary of the Dniester in Ukraine
