= Zbryzh, Khmelnytskyi Oblast =

Rural locality in Khmelnytskyi Oblast, Ukraine

Zbryzh Збриж
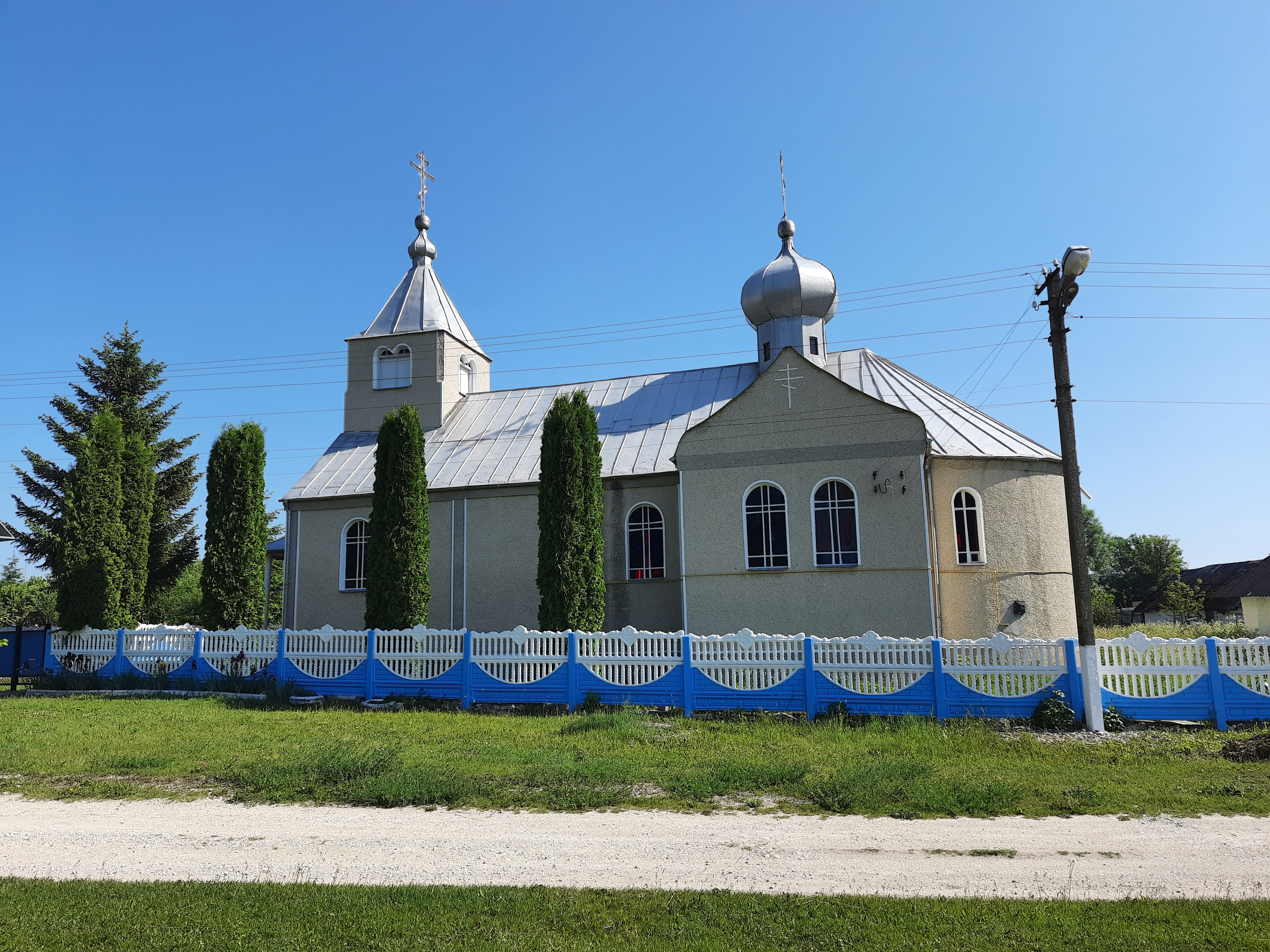
- St. Michael church

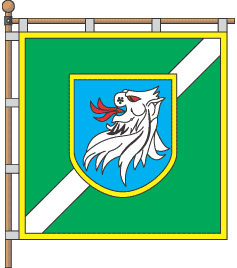
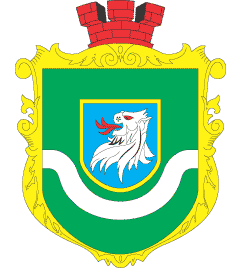
- Flag Coat of arms

- Location in Khmelnytskyi Oblast
- Coordinates: 48°54′50″N 26°11′56″E
- Country: Ukraine
- Oblast: Khmelnytskyi Oblast
- Raion: Kamianets-Podilskyi Raion
- Hromada: Chemerivtsi settlement hromada
- Time zone: UTC+2 (EET)
  - Summer (DST): UTC+3 (EEST)
- Postal code: 31635

Zbryzh (Ukrainian: Збриж) is a village in the Chemerivtsi settlement hromada of the Kamianets-Podilskyi Raion of Khmelnytskyi Oblast in Ukraine.

== History ==
The first written mention of the village was in 1352. Former names: Yaroslav (before 1493), Khorivtsi (1493–1542), Khorzhivtsi (1542).

In 1565, the owner of the village, magnate Lanckoroński, founded the town of Nove Brzhezie, whose name was transformed into the present-day Zbryzh. In 1646, Polish King Władysław IV confirmed the city's rights.

In 1932–1933, the villagers suffered from the Holodomor.

On 19 July 2020, as a result of the administrative-territorial reform and liquidation of the Chemerivtsi Raion, the village became part of the Kamianets-Podilskyi Raion.

== Religion ==
- Church of the Assumption (destroyed in 1918 by Russian artillery)
- Capuchin monastery

== Monuments ==
- Zbryzh Castle

== Sources ==
- "Zbrzyź". Geographical Dictionary of the Kingdom of Poland (in Polish). 14. Warszawa: Kasa im. Józefa Mianowskiego. 1895. p. 532.
