= List of cities in Khmelnytskyi Oblast =

Location of cities in Khmelnytskyi Oblast.

There are 13 populated places in Khmelnytskyi Oblast, Ukraine, that have been officially granted city status (Ukrainian: місто, romanized: misto) by the Verkhovna Rada, the country's parliament. Settlements with more than 10,000 people are eligible for city status, although the status is typically also granted to settlements of historical or regional importance. As of 5 December 2001, the date of the first and only official census in the country since independence, (Note: As of 11 July 2023) the most populous city in the oblast was the regional capital, Khmelnytskyi, with a population of 253,994 people, while the least populous city was Derazhnia, with 10,446 people. For its contributions to the country's defense during the Russian invasion, one city in the oblast, Starokostiantyniv, was awarded with the honorary title Hero City of Ukraine in 2025.

From independence in 1991 to 2020, six cities in the oblast were designated as cities of regional significance (municipalities), which had self-government under city councils, while the oblast's remaining seven cities were located amongst twenty raions (districts) as cities of district significance, which are subordinated to the governments of the raions. On 18 July 2020, an administrative reform abolished and merged the oblast's raions and cities of regional significance into three new, expanded raions. The three raions that make up the oblast are Kamianets-Podilskyi, Khmelnytskyi, and Shepetivka.

== List of cities ==
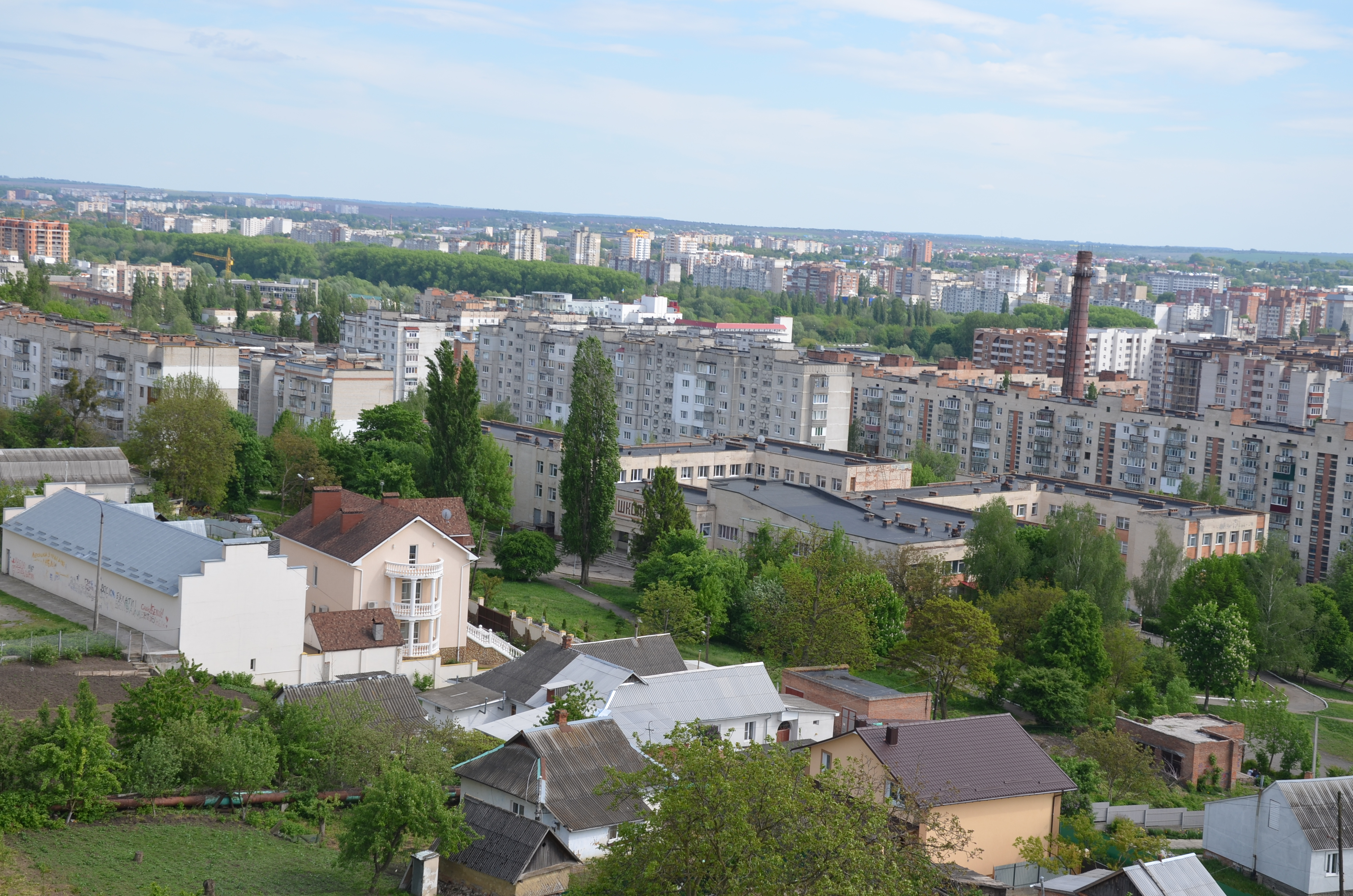
Khmelnytskyi, capital and most populous city in Khmelnytskyi Oblast

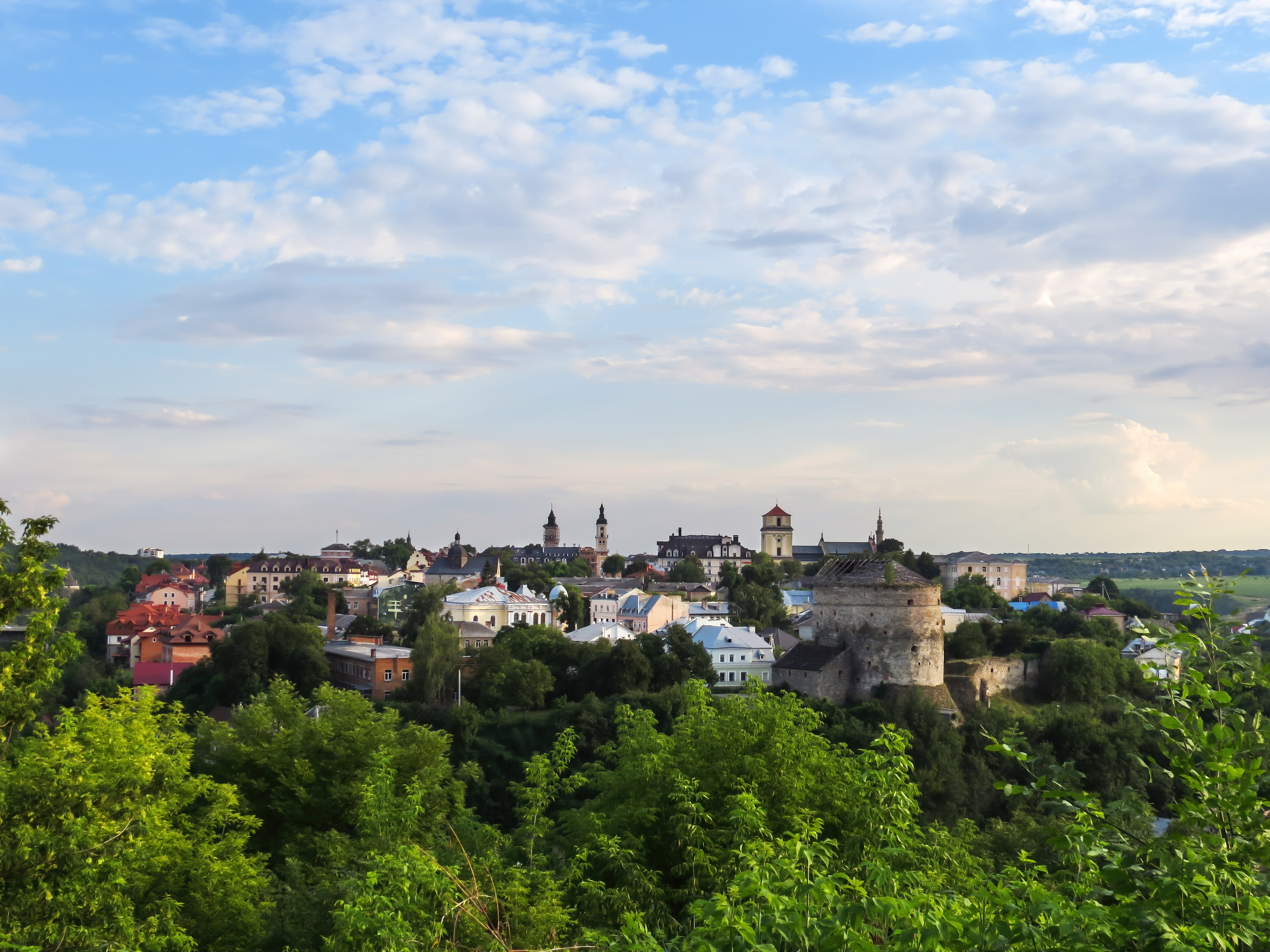
Kamianets-Podilskyi, the second most populous city in the oblast known for its castle

Cities in Khmelnytskyi Oblast
Name	Name (in Ukrainian) (Note: Links to the Ukrainian Wikipedia articles for each city)	Raion (district)	Population (2022 estimates)	Population (2001 census)	Population change
Derazhnia	Деражня	Khmelnytskyi	9,772	10,446	−6.45%
Dunaivtsi	Дунаївці	Kamianets-Podilskyi	15,707	16,448	−4.51%
Horodok	Городок	Khmelnytskyi	15,633	17,746	−11.91%
Iziaslav	Ізяслав	Shepetivka	15,996	18,444	−13.27%
Kamianets-Podilskyi	Кам'янець-Подільський	Kamianets-Podilskyi	96,896	99,610	−2.72%
Khmelnytskyi	Хмельницький	Khmelnytskyi	274,452	253,994	+8.05%
Krasyliv	Красилів	Khmelnytskyi	18,356	20,580	−10.81%
Netishyn	Нетішин	Shepetivka	36,492	34,358	+6.21%
Polonne	Полонне	Shepetivka	20,172	23,211	−13.09%
Shepetivka	Шепетівка	Shepetivka	40,299	48,212	−16.41%
Slavuta	Славута	Shepetivka	34,918	34,340	+1.68%
Starokostiantyniv	Старокостянтинів	Khmelnytskyi	33,921	35,206	−3.65%
Volochysk	Волочиськ	Khmelnytskyi	18,295	20,958	−12.71%

== See also ==
- List of cities in Ukraine
