= Zbryzh Castle =

Castle in Zbryzh, Khmelnytskyi Oblast, Ukraine

- Збризький замок
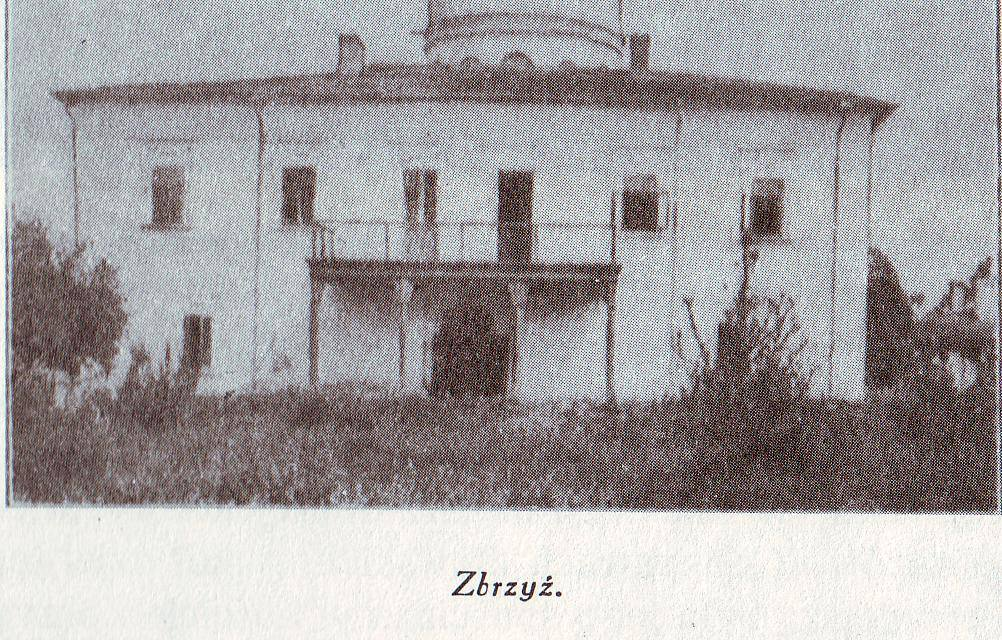
- Castle gate building

General information
- Location: Zbryzh, Kamianets-Podilskyi Raion, Khmelnytskyi Oblast
- Country: Ukraine
- Coordinates: 48°54′55.7″N 26°11′38.0″E

The Zbryzh Castle (Ukrainian: Збризький замок, romanized: Zbryz'kyi zamok) is located in Zbryzh, Khmelnytskyi Oblast, Ukraine. The castle was built by General Adam Tarło, starosta of goszczyński, brzegowski, skalski on the Zbrucz River.

== History ==
By the end of the 19th century, only remnants remained of the castle erected by the Tarłów family. The restored gatehouse served until 1917 as a two-story residential house for the Gradowski family, the owners at the time. The house, covered by a low roof at the front, had a balcony on the first floor, supported by four columns, and a two-story round tower at the back.
