= Stara Ushytsia settlement hromada =

Stara Ushytsia settlement hromada Староушицька селищна громада
- Hromada
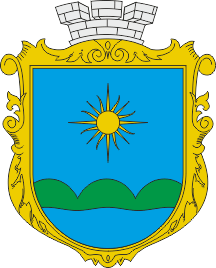
- Flag Seal
- Interactive map of Stara Ushytsia settlement hromada
- Country: Ukraine
- Oblast: Khmelnytskyi Oblast
- Raion: Kamianets-Podilskyi Raion

Area
  - Total: 221.99 km^{2} (85.71 sq mi)

Population (2025)
  - Total: 5,848
- Website: staroushytska-gromada.gov.ua

Stara Ushytsia settlement hromada (Ukrainian: Староушицька селищна громада) is one of the hromadas of Kamianets-Podilskyi Raion in Khmelnytskyi Oblast of Ukraine. Its administrative centre is the rural settlement of Stara Ushytsia.

== Composition ==
The hromada encompasses the rural settlement of Stara Ushytsia and 12 villages:

- Horayivka
- Hrushka
- Huta-Chuhorska
- Kashtanivka
- Krushanivka
- Luchky
- Lypy
- Lyskivtsi
- Nefedivtsi
- Podilske
- Runkoshiv
- Chabanivka

== Points of interest ==
The village of Hrushka is located on the only road leading to Bakota, the former princely capital of Ponyzzia. Hrushka and neighbouring Horayivka are known for their old clay khatas. An art project currently active in the villages is dedicated to the adornment of local residences with traditional Ukrainian ornaments.
