= Kamianets Okruha =

Administrative unit in the Ukrainian SSR

Kamianets Okruha Кам'янецька округа
- Okruha of Ukrainian Soviet Socialist Republic
- 1923–1930; 1935–1937
- Capital: Kamianets-Podilsk
- Population
  - 1926 census: 769,999
- Government
- Executive Secretary
  - 1929–1930: Hryhoriy Panasenko (CP(b)U)
- Historical era: Soviet Union
  - Division established: 1923
  - Abolished: 1930
  - Re-established: 1935
  - Abolished: 1937
- Political subdivisions: 16 raions (1926); 8 raions (1935)
Preceded by	Succeeded by
Kamenets-Podolsky Uyezd	Kamianets-Podilskyi Oblast
- Today part of: Khmelnytskyi Oblast

Kamianets Okruha (Ukrainian: Кам'янецька округа, Kam'ianets'ka okruha) was one of the administrative units (an okruha) of the Ukrainian Soviet Socialist Republic from 1923–1930 and again from 1935–1937.

A large portion of the former okruhas territory is now part of the Kamianets-Podilskyi Raion (district) of the Khmelnytskyi Oblast. Its administrative center was located in the city of Kamianets-Podilsk.

== History ==
The Kamianets Okruha was first created in 1923 as part of the Podolia Governorate, a remnant of the former Russian Empire. In 1925, all of the governorates throughout the Ukrainian SSR were abolished, and okruhas became the first level of administrative division. In 1926, the okruha was divided into a total of 16 raions. Because the Ukrainian Soviet authorities felt the system of administrative division was ineffective and hard to administer, the Kamianets Okruha along with all of the other okras were done away with completely in 1930.

However, the okruha was re-established in 1935 as a border district of the Vinnytsia Oblast consisting of a total of 8 districts. In 1937, the okruha was yet again abolished, and its territory was reassigned to districts of the newly created Kamianets-Podilskyi Oblast.

== Demographics ==
According to the results of the 1926 Soviet census, the Kamianets Okruha had a population of 769,999. Of these 124,750 were residents in urban areas, compared to 645,249 for rural areas.

In terms of ethnicity, 82.2 percent were Ukrainians, 8.9 percent were Russians, 4.3 percent were Jews, 3 percent were Moldovans, with the rest of the ethnic groups adding up to the remaining 1 percent.

== See also ==
- Administrative divisions of the Ukrainian SSR
- Administrative divisions of Khmelnytskyi Oblast
