= Orynyn rural hromada =

Orynyn rural hromada Орининська сільска громада
- Hromada
- Interactive map of Orynyn rural hromada
- Country: Ukraine
- Oblast: Khmelnytskyi Oblast
- Raion: Kamianets-Podilskyi Raion

Area
  - Total: 231.3 km^{2} (89.3 sq mi)

Population
  - Total: 8,350
- Website: orynynska-gromada.gov.ua

Orynyn rural hromada (Ukrainian: Орининська сільська громада) is one of the hromadas of Kamianets-Podilskyi Raion in Khmelnytskyi Oblast of Ukraine. Its administrative centre is the village of Orynyn.

== Composition ==
The hromada encompasses 17 villages:

- Adamivka
- Chornokozyntsi
- Dobrovillia
- Kadyivtsi
- Kizia
- Niverka
- Novovolodymyrivka
- Orynyn (administrative centre)
- Paraivka
- Pidpylypya
- Podoliany
- Pryvorottia
- Ripyntsi
- Shustivtsi
- Surzha
- Teklivka
- Zalissia Pershe
