= Zakupne =

Rural locality in Khmelnytskyi Oblast, Ukraine

Zakupne Закупне
- Rural settlement
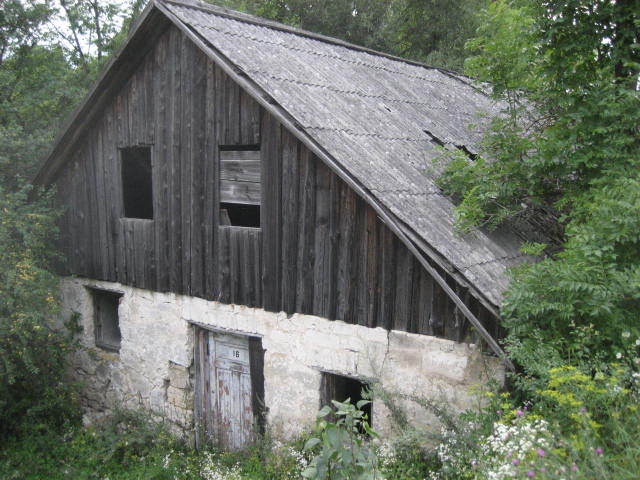

- Location within Khmelnytskyi Oblast Location within Ukraine
- Coordinates: 49°07′10″N 26°20′13″E
- Country: Ukraine
- Oblast: Khmelnytskyi Oblast
- Raion: Kamianets-Podilskyi Raion
- Hromada: Zakupne settlement hromada
- Founded: early 18th century
- Town status: 1972

Government
  - Town Head: Borys Konoval

Area
  - Total: 2.74 km^{2} (1.06 sq mi)
- Elevation: 313 m (1,027 ft)

Population (2022)
  - Total: 1,360 ▼
  - Density: 496/km^{2} (1,290/sq mi)
- Time zone: UTC+2 (EET)
  - Summer (DST): UTC+3 (EEST)
- Postal code: 31614
- Area code: +380 38xx
- Website: http://rada.gov.ua/

Zakupne (Ukrainian: Закýпне; Russian: Закýпное; Polish: Zakupne) is a rural settlement in Kamianets-Podilskyi Raion, Khmelnytskyi Oblast, western Ukraine. It hosts the administration of Zakupne settlement hromada, one of the hromadas of Ukraine. The settlement's population was 1,452 as of the 2001 Ukrainian Census. Current population: 1,360 (2022 estimate).

== History ==
Zakupne was first founded in the beginning of the 18th century, and it received the status of an urban-type settlement in 1972.

Until 18 July 2020, Zakupne belonged to Chemerivtsi Raion. The raion was abolished in July 2020 as part of the administrative reform of Ukraine, which reduced the number of raions of Khmelnytskyi Oblast to three. The area of Chemerivtsi Raion was merged into Kamianets-Podilskyi Raion.

Until 26 January 2024, Zalupne was designated urban-type settlement. On this day, a new law entered into force which abolished this status, and Zakupne became a rural settlement.

== See also ==
- Chemerivtsi, the other urban-type settlement in the Chemerivtsi Raion of Khmelnytskyi Oblast
