= Chemerivtsi settlement hromada =

Chemerivtsi settlement hromada Чемеровецька селищна громада
- Hromada
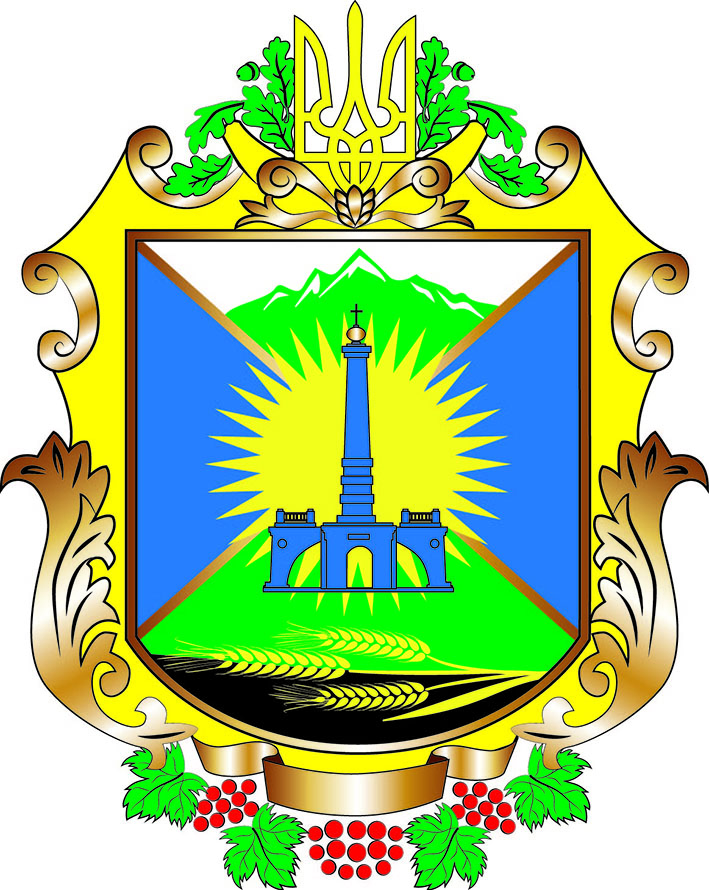
- Seal
- Interactive map of Chemerivtsi settlement hromada
- Country: Ukraine
- Oblast: Khmelnytskyi Oblast
- Raion: Kamianets-Podilskyi Raion
- Founded: 2016

Area
  - Total: 620.5 km^{2} (239.6 sq mi)

Population
  - Total: 27,368
- Website: chemerovecka-gromada.gov.ua

Chemerivtsi settlement hromada (Ukrainian: Чемеровецька селищна громада) is one of the hromadas of Kamianets-Podilskyi Raion in Khmelnytskyi Oblast in Ukraine. Its administrative centre is the rural settlement of Chemerivtsi.

== Composition ==
The hromada encompasses 46 localities, which include the rural settlement of Chemerivtsi (administrative centre) and 45 villages:

- Andriivka
- Antonivka
- Berezhanka
- Bila
- Chaharivka
- Cherche
- Chorna
- Demkivtsi
- Dibrova
- Drahanivka
- Hayove
- Khropotova
- Kochubiiv
- Kormylcha
- Krasnostavtsi
- Krykiv
- Kuhaivtsi
- Letava
- Mala Zelena
- Mykhailivka
- Nova Huta
- Nove Zhyttia
- Pochapyntsi
- Ruzha
- Sadove
- Shydlivtsi
- Slobidka-Skypchanska
- Slobidka-Smotrytska
- Sokyryntsi
- Stepanivka
- Svirshkivtsi
- Teremkivtsi
- Velyka Zelena
- Viktorivka
- Vyhoda
- Vyshneve
- Vyshnivchyk
- Yampilchyk
- Yurkivtsi
- Zalissia
- Zaluchchia
- Zarichanka
- Zavadivka
- Zbryzh
- Zherdia
