= Chemerivtsi =

Rural locality in Khmelnytskyi Oblast, Ukraine

Chemerivtsi Чемерівці
- Rural settlement
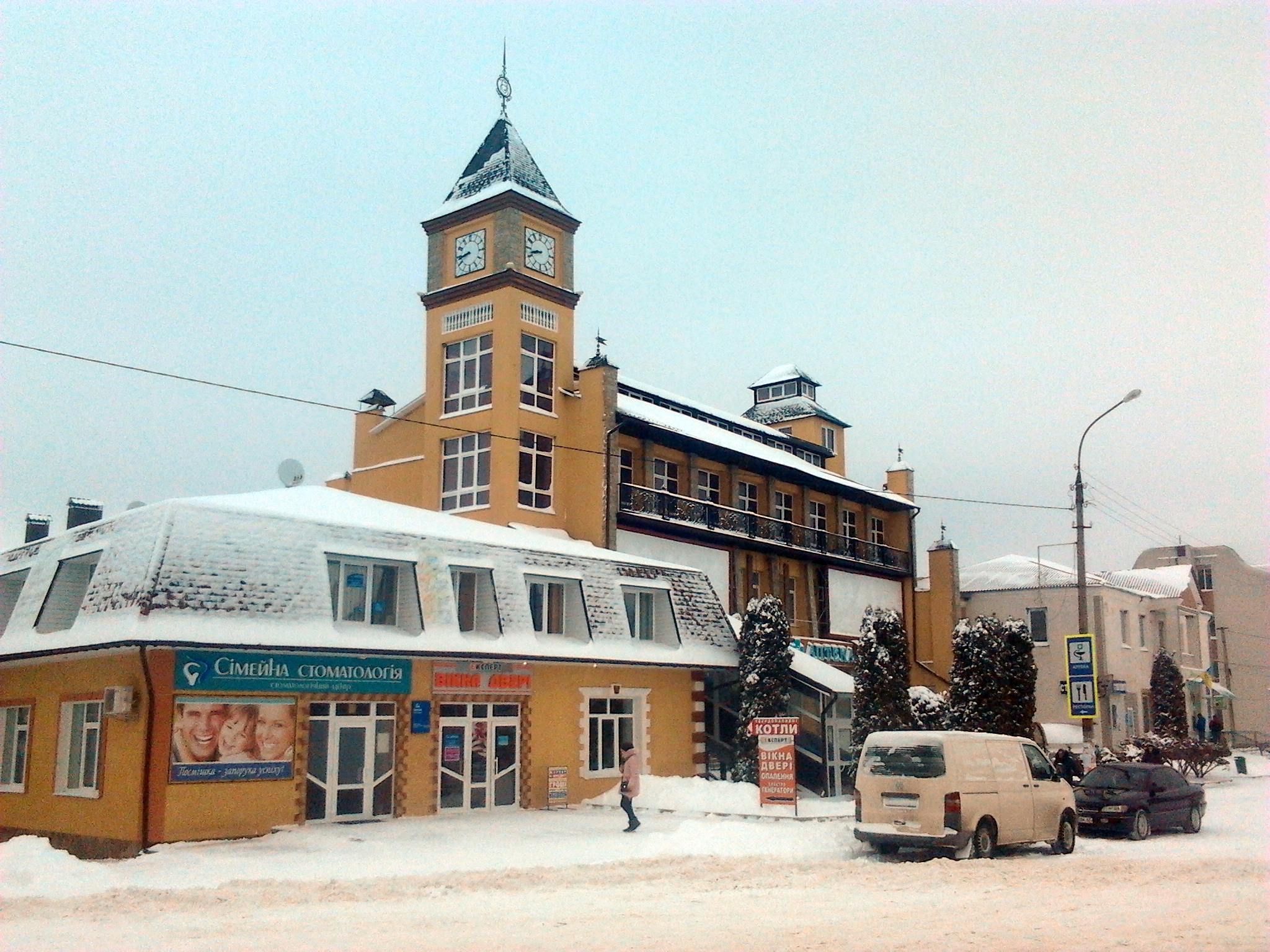

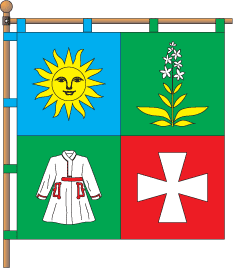
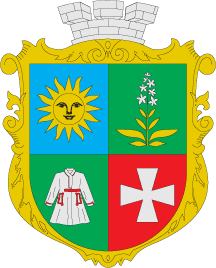
- Flag Coat of arms

- Location within Ukraine Location within Europe
- Coordinates: 49°00′44″N 26°21′11″E
- Country: Ukraine
- Oblast: Khmelnytskyi Oblast
- Raion: Kamianets-Podilskyi Raion
- Hromada: Chemerivtsi settlement hromada
- Founded: 1565
- Town status: 1959

Government
  - Town Head: Volodymyr Voitov

Area
  - Total: 5.61 km^{2} (2.17 sq mi)
- Elevation: 278 m (912 ft)

Population (2022)
  - Total: 5,088 ▼
  - Density: 907/km^{2} (2,350/sq mi)
- Time zone: UTC+2 (EET)
  - Summer (DST): UTC+3 (EEST)
- Postal code: 31600—31607
- Area code: +380 3859
- Website: http://rada.gov.ua/

Chemerivtsi (Ukrainian: Чемерівці) is a rural settlement in Kamianets-Podilskyi Raion, Khmelnytskyi Oblast, western Ukraine. It hosts the administration of Chemerivtsi settlement hromada, one of the hromadas of Ukraine.

== History ==
Chemerivtsi was first founded in 1565, and it received the Magdeburg rights in 1797.

In 1898, the town had an almost exclusively Jewish population of 1,282.

In 1932–1933, Chemerivtsi suffered from the Holodomor.

It received the status of an urban-type settlement in 1959.

Until 18 July 2020, Chemerivtsi was the administrative center of Chemerivtsi Raion. The raion was abolished in July 2020 as part of the administrative reform of Ukraine, which reduced the number of raions of Khmelnytskyi Oblast to three. The area of Chemerivtsi Raion was merged into Kamianets-Podilskyi Raion.

Until 26 January 2024, Chemerivtsi was designated urban-type settlement. On this day, a new law entered into force which abolished this status, and Chemerivtsi became a rural settlement.

== Population ==
The settlement's population was 5,431 as of the 2001 Ukrainian Census and 5,088 (2022 estimate).

== Gallery ==
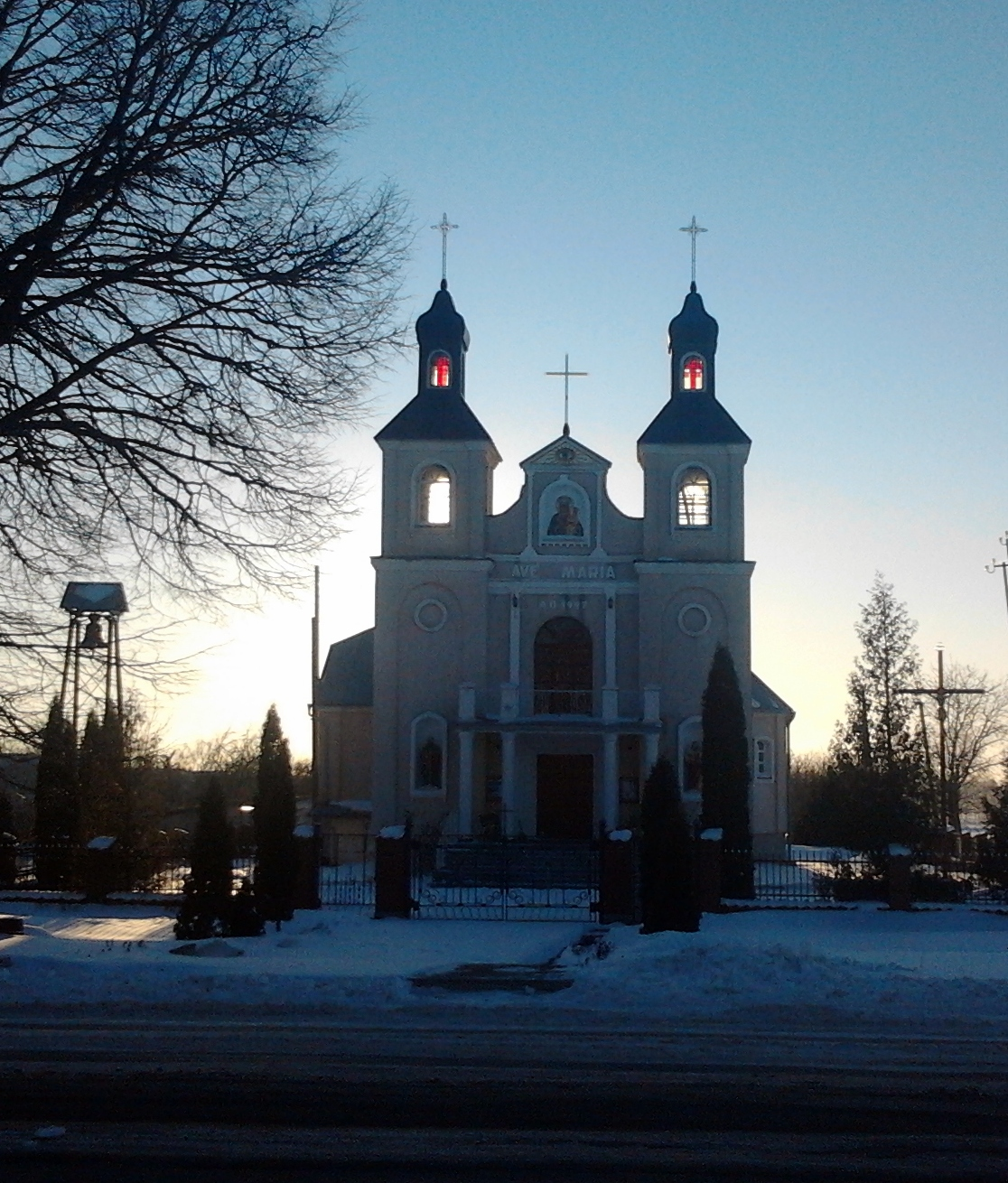

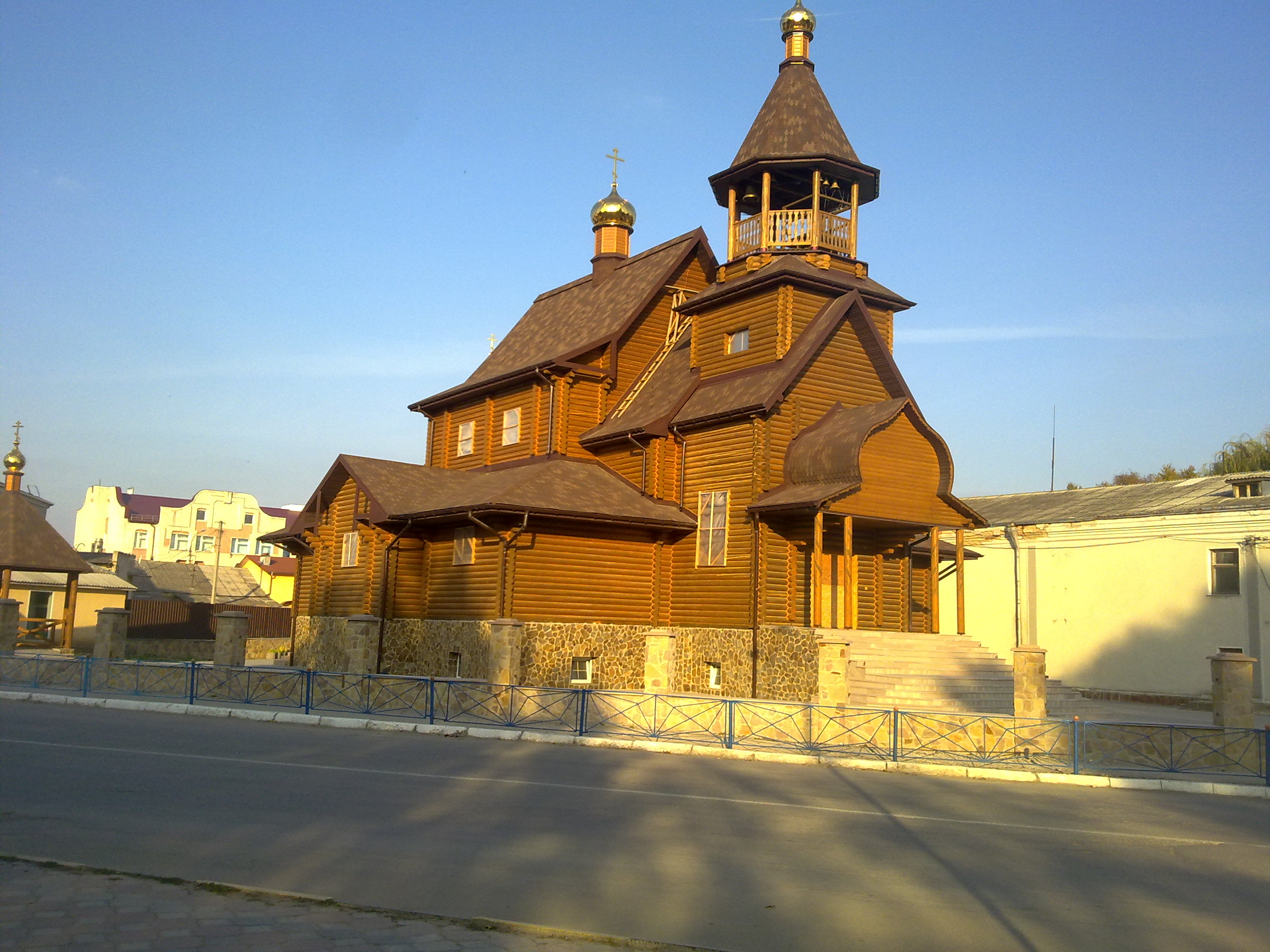

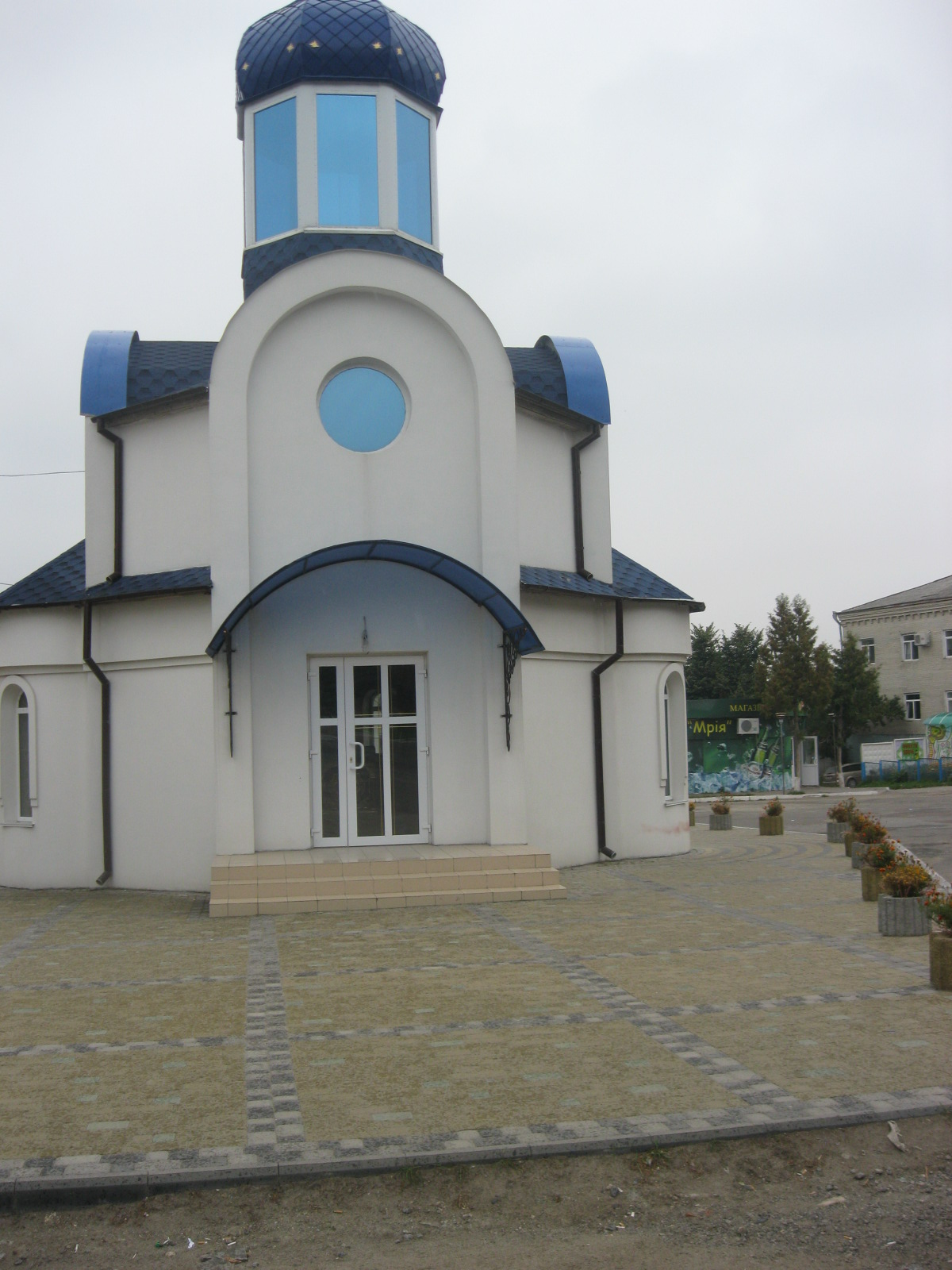

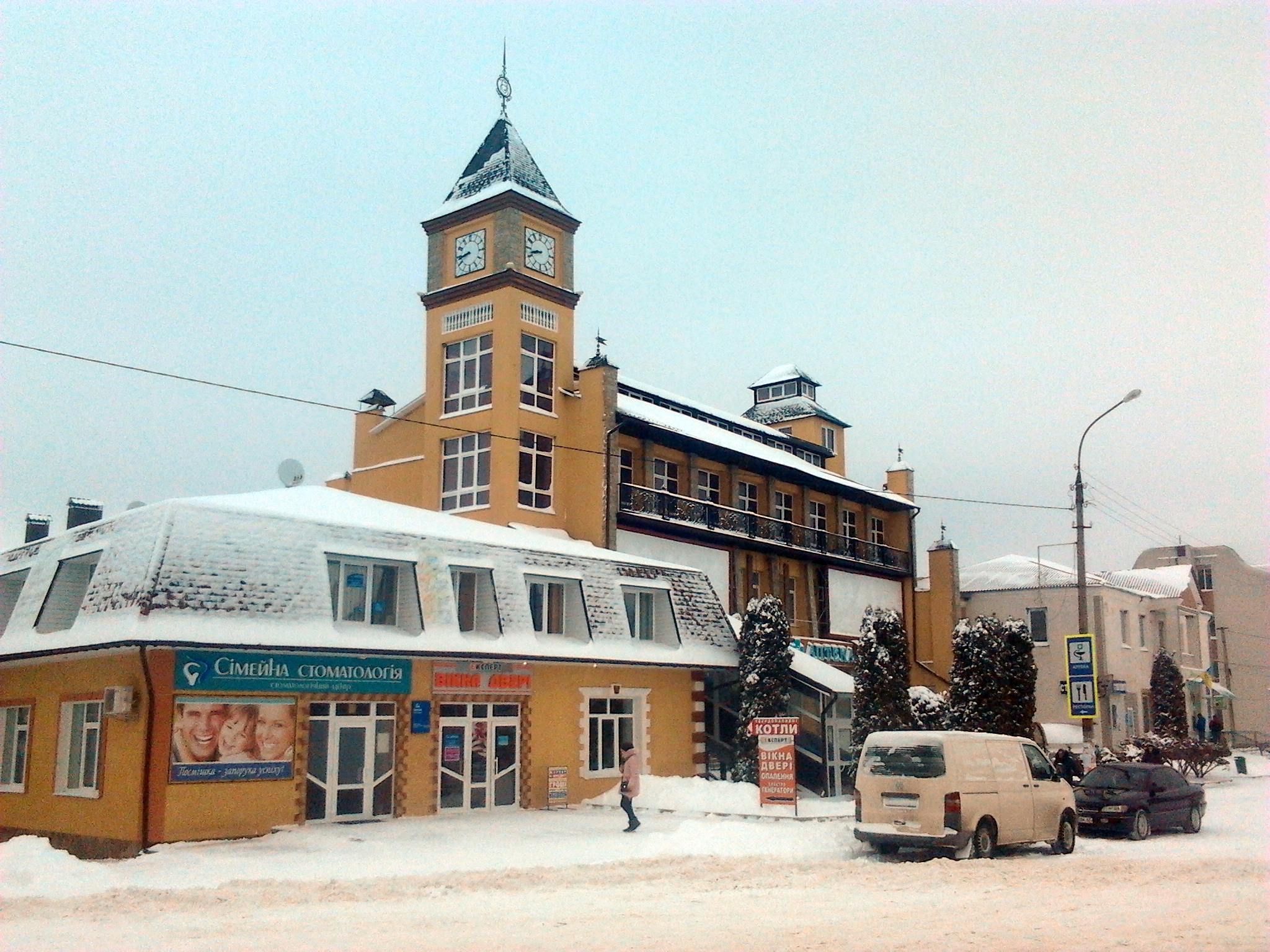

== See also ==
- Zakupne, the other urban-type settlement in the Chemerivtsi Raion of Khmelnytskyi Oblast
