= Stara Syniava Raion =

Former subdivision of Khmelnytskyi Oblast, Ukraine

Stara Syniava Raion Старосинявський район
- Raion
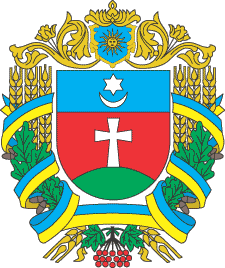
- Flag Coat of arms

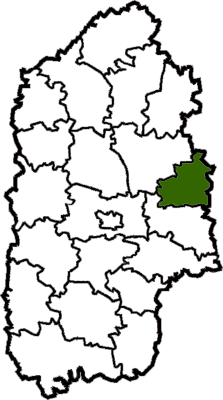
- Coordinates: 49°37′52″N 27°36′50″E
- Country: Ukraine
- Region: Khmelnytskyi Oblast
- Established: 7 March 1923
- Disestablished: 18 July 2020
- Admin. center: Stara Syniava
- Subdivisions: List: 0 — city councils; 1 — settlement councils; 16 — rural councils; Number of localities: 0 — cities; 1 — urban-type settlements; 44 — villages; 0 — rural settlements

Government
  - Governor: Anatoliy Voloshyn (PR)

Area
  - Total: 662 km^{2} (256 sq mi)

Population (2020)
  - Total: 19,093 ▼
  - Density: 28.8/km^{2} (74.7/sq mi)
- Time zone: UTC+02:00 (EET)
  - Summer (DST): UTC+03:00 (EEST)
- Postal index: 31400—31445
- Area code: +380 3850

Stara Syniava Raion (Ukrainian: Старосинявський район, Starosyniavs'kyi raion) was one of the 20 administrative raions (a district) of Khmelnytskyi Oblast in western Ukraine. Its administrative center was located in the urban-type settlement of Stara Syniava. Its population was 24,985 in 2001. The raion was abolished on 18 July 2020 as part of the administrative reform of Ukraine, which reduced the number of raions of Khmelnytskyi Oblast to three. The area of Stara Syniava Raion was merged into Khmelnytskyi Raion. The last estimate of the raion population was 19,093 (2020 est.)

== Geography ==
Stara Syniava Raion was located in the eastern part of Khmelnytskyi Oblast, corresponding to the modern-day boundaries of the Volhynia and Podolia historical regions.

== History ==
It was first established on March 7, 1923 as part of a full-scale administrative reorganization of the Ukrainian Soviet Socialist Republic.

== Subdivisions ==
At the time of disestablishment, the raion consisted of one hromadas, Stara Syniava settlement hromada with the administration in Stara Syniava.

Stara Syniava Raion was divided in a way that followed the general administrative scheme in Ukraine. Local government was also organized along a similar scheme nationwide. Consequently, raions were subdivided into councils, which were the prime level of administrative division in the country.

Each of the raion's urban localities administered their own councils, often containing a few other villages within its jurisdiction. However, only a handful of rural localities were organized into councils, which also might contain a few villages within its jurisdiction.

Accordingly, the Stara Syniava Raion was divided into:

- 1 settlement council—made up of the urban-type settlement of Stara Syniava (administrative center)
- 16 village councils

Overall, the raion had a total of 45 populated localities, consisting of one urban-type settlement, and 44 villages.
