= Stara Syniava =

Rural locality in Khmelnytskyi Oblast, Ukraine

Stara Syniava Стара Синява
- Rural settlement
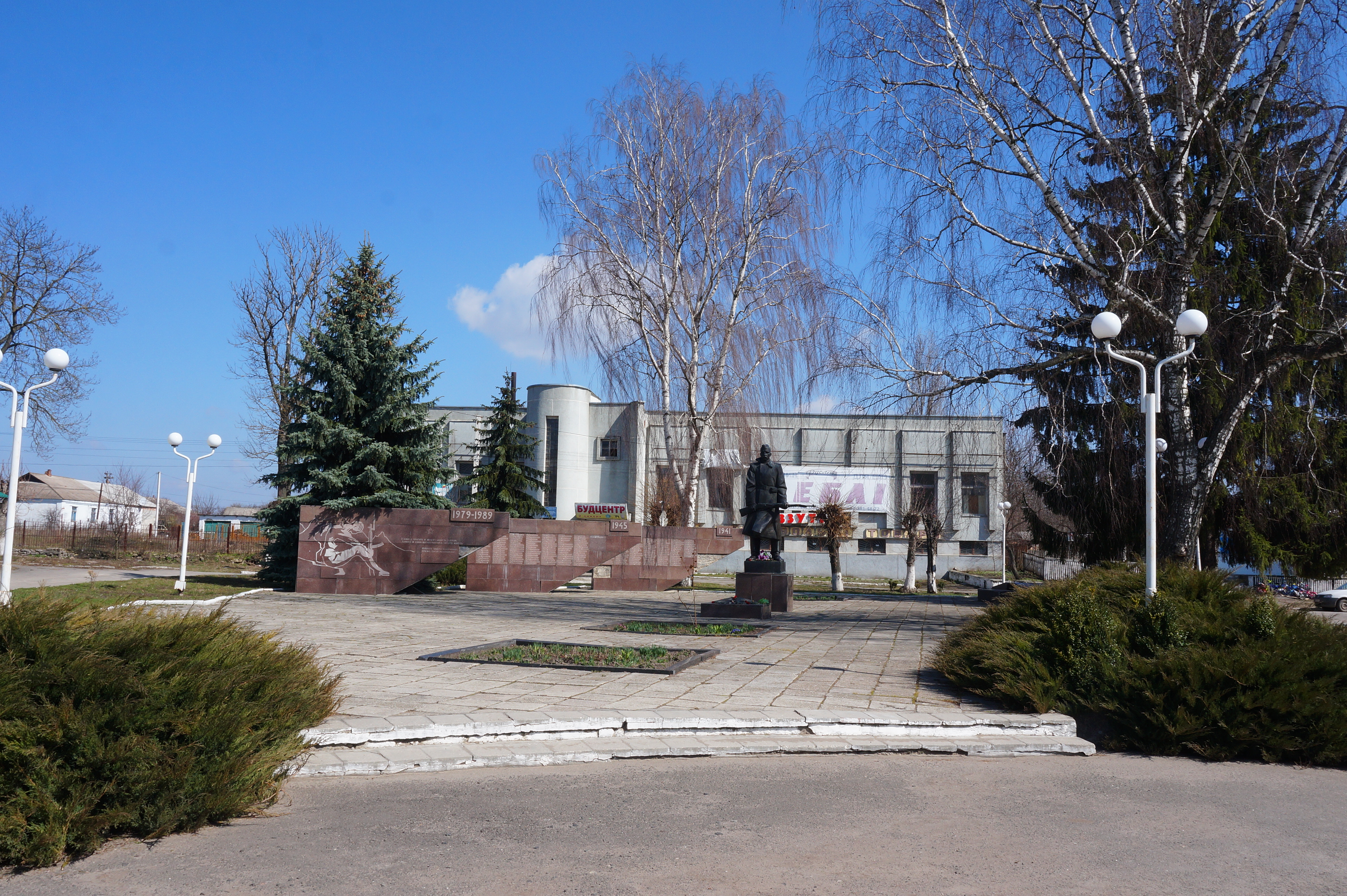

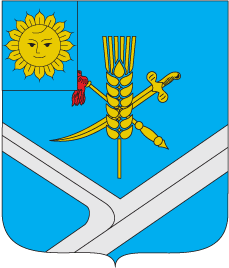
- Coat of arms

- Location within Khmelnytskyi Oblast Location within Ukraine
- Coordinates: 49°35′45″N 27°37′23″E
- Country: Ukraine
- Oblast: Khmelnytskyi Oblast
- Raion: Khmelnytskyi Raion
- Hromada: Stara Syniava settlement hromada
- Magdeburg law: 1543
- Town status: 1956

Government
  - Town Chief: Vitali Zdebsky

Area
  - Total: 0.014 km^{2} (0.0054 sq mi)
- Elevation: 294 m (965 ft)

Population (2022)
  - Total: 5,084 ▲
  - Density: 360,000/km^{2} (940,000/sq mi)
- Time zone: UTC+2 (EET)
  - Summer (DST): UTC+3 (EEST)
- Postal code: 31400
- Area code: +380 3850
- Website: http://rada.gov.ua/

Stara Syniava (Ukrainian: Стара Синява) is a rural settlement in Khmelnytskyi Raion, Khmelnytskyi Oblast, western Ukraine. It hosts the administration of Stara Syniava settlement hromada, one of the hromadas of Ukraine. The settlement's population was 5,961 as of the 2001 Ukrainian Census. Current population: 5,084 (2022 estimate).

The settlement, previously named Syniava, received the Magdeburg rights in 1543. In 1956, the town received the status of an urban-type settlement.

== History ==
Until 18 July 2020, Stara Syniava was the administrative center of Stara Syniava Raion. The raion was abolished in July 2020 as part of the administrative reform of Ukraine, which reduced the number of raions of Khmelnytskyi Oblast to three. The area of Stara Syniava Raion was merged into Khmelnytskyi Raion.

Until 26 January 2024, Stara Syniava was designated urban-type settlement. On this day, a new law entered into force which abolished this status, and Stara Syniava became a rural settlement.

=== Jewish Population ===
Stara Syniava had a large Jewish population for nearly 300 years, having been given the status of shtetl. In 1897, the town had 2279 Jews. During World War II, many Jewish residents were able to flee temporarily to Siberia and Uzbekistan, escaping extermination by the advancing German Army and Hitler's SS. Many who remained behind were rounded up by the invaders and killed evidenced by a mass grave of Jews found in Stara Sinyava. After the war some Jews returned to Stara Syniava and resumed living there. In the late 1970s Stara Syniava's Jewish population began emigrating from the USSR, largely to the U.S., Canada, and Israel. Today there are almost no Jews in the town.
