= Chemerivtsi Raion =

Former subdivision of Khmelnytskyi Oblast, Ukraine

Chemerivtsi Raion Чемеровецький район
- Raion
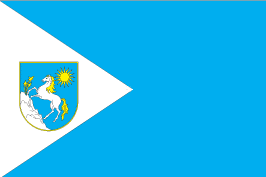
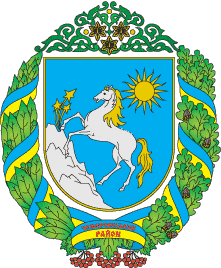
- Flag Coat of arms

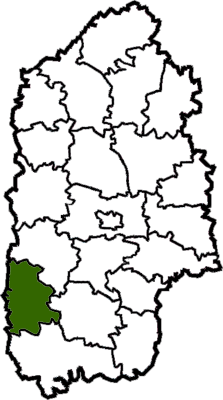
- Coordinates: 48°58′35″N 26°22′16″E
- Country: Ukraine
- Region: Khmelnytskyi Oblast
- Established: 7 March 1923
- Disestablished: 18 July 2020
- Admin. center: Chemerivtsi
- Subdivisions: List: 0 — city councils; 2 — settlement councils; 33 — rural councils; Number of localities: 0 — cities; 2 — urban-type settlements; 68 — villages; 0 — rural settlements

Government
  - Governor: Volodymyr Svizhyi (PR)

Area
  - Total: 930 km^{2} (360 sq mi)

Population (2020)
  - Total: 38,770 ▼
  - Density: 42/km^{2} (110/sq mi)
- Time zone: UTC+02:00 (EET)
  - Summer (DST): UTC+03:00 (EEST)
- Postal index: 31600—31666
- Area code: +380 3859
- Website: chem-rda.inf.ua

Chemerivtsi Raion (Ukrainian: Чемеровецький район, Chemerovets'kyi raion) was one of the 20 administrative raions (a district) of Khmelnytskyi Oblast in western Ukraine. Its administrative center was located in the urban-type settlement of Chemerivtsi. Its population was 51,009 in the 2001 Ukrainian Census. The raion was abolished on 18 July 2020 as part of the administrative reform of Ukraine, which reduced the number of raions of Khmelnytskyi Oblast to three. The area of Chemerivtsi Raion was merged into Kamianets-Podilskyi Raion. The last estimate of the raion population was 38,770 (2020 est.)

== Geography ==
Chemerivtsi Raion was located in the southwestern part of the Khmelnytskyi Oblast, in the modern-day boundaries of the Podolia historical region. Its total area constituted 930 square kilometres (360 mi^{2}). To its west, the raion bordered upon the neighboring Ternopil Oblast.

== Subdivisions ==
At the time of disestablishment, the raion consisted of three hromadas:

- Chemerivtsi settlement hromada with the administration in Chemerivtsi;
- Hukiv rural hromada with the administration in the selo of Hukiv;
- Zakupne settlement hromada with the administration in the urban-type settlement of Zakupne.

== History ==
Chemerivtsi Raion was first established on March 7, 1923 as part of a full-scale administrative reorganization of the Ukrainian Soviet Socialist Republic, from the former territories of Vilkhivtsi and Berezhany volosts (a former administrative division roughly equivalent to that of a modern raion).

== Administrative divisions ==
Chemerivtsi Raion was divided in a way that followed the general administrative scheme in Ukraine. Local government was also organized along a similar scheme nationwide. Consequently, raions were subdivided into councils, which were the prime level of administrative division in the country.

Each of the raion's urban localities administered their own councils, often containing a few other villages within its jurisdiction. However, only a handful of rural localities were organized into councils, which also might contain a few villages within its jurisdiction.

Accordingly, the Chemerivtsi Raion was divided into:

- 2 settlement councils—made up of the urban-type settlements of Chemerivtsi (administrative center) and Zakupne
- 33 village councils

Overall, the raion had a total of 70 populated localities, consisting of two urban-type settlements, and 68 villages.
