= Nova Ushytsia Raion =

Former subdivision of Khmelnytskyi Oblast, Ukraine

Nova Ushytsia Raion Новоушицький район
- Raion
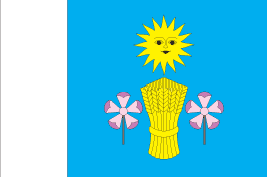
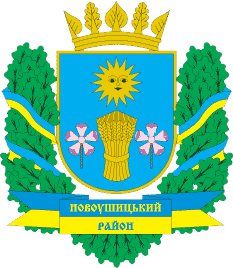
- Flag Coat of arms

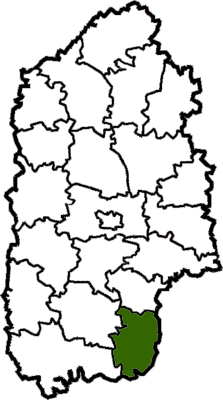
- Coordinates: 48°50′06″N 27°16′17″E
- Country: Ukraine
- Region: Khmelnytskyi Oblast
- Established: 7 March 1923
- Disestablished: 18 July 2020
- Admin. center: Nova Ushytsia
- Subdivisions: List: 0 — city councils; 1 — settlement councils; 21 — rural councils; Number of localities: 0 — cities; 1 — urban-type settlements; 57 — villages; 1 — rural settlements

Government
  - Governor: Oleksandr Moskovchuk

Area
  - Total: 853 km^{2} (329 sq mi)

Population (2020)
  - Total: 26,983 ▼
  - Density: 31.6/km^{2} (81.9/sq mi)
- Time zone: UTC+02:00 (EET)
  - Summer (DST): UTC+03:00 (EEST)
- Postal index: 32600—32664
- Area code: +380 3847
- Website: http://www.rda.nu.km.ua/

Nova Ushytsia Raion (Ukrainian: Новоушицький район, Novoushyts'kyi raion) was one of the 20 administrative raions (a district) of Khmelnytskyi Oblast in western Ukraine. Its administrative center was located in the urban-type settlement of Nova Ushytsia. Its population was 36,457 in the 2001 Ukrainian Census. The raion was abolished on 18 July 2020 as part of the administrative reform of Ukraine, which reduced the number of raions of Khmelnytskyi Oblast to three. The area of Nova Ushytsia Raion was merged into Kamianets-Podilskyi Raion. The last estimate of the raion population was 26,983 (2020 est.)

== Geography ==
Nova Ushytsia Raion was located in the south-central part of Khmelnytskyi Oblast, corresponding to the modern-day boundaries of the Volhynia and Podolia historical regions. Its total area constituted 853 square kilometres (329 mi^{2}) and about 3.9 percent of the oblast's area.

== History ==
Nova Ushytsia Raion was first established on March 7, 1923 as part of a full-scale administrative reorganization of the Ukrainian Soviet Socialist Republic.

== Subdivisions ==
At the time of disestablishment, the raion consisted of one hromada, Nova Ushytsia settlement hromada with the administration in Nova Ushytsia.

Nova Ushytsia Raion was divided in a way that followed the general administrative scheme in Ukraine. Local government was also organized along a similar scheme nationwide. Consequently, raions were subdivided into councils, which were the prime level of administrative division in the country.

Each of the raion's urban localities administered their own councils, often containing a few other villages within its jurisdiction. However, only a handful of rural localities were organized into councils, which also might contain a few villages within its jurisdiction.

Accordingly, the Nova Ushytsia Raion was divided into:

- 1 settlement council—made up of the urban-type settlement of Nova Ushytsia (administrative center)
- 21 village councils

Overall, the raion had a total of 59 populated localities, consisting of one urban-type settlement, 57 villages, and one rural settlement.
