= Nova Ushytsia =

Rural locality in Khmelnytskyi Oblast, Ukraine

Nova Ushytsia Нова Ушиця
- Rural settlement
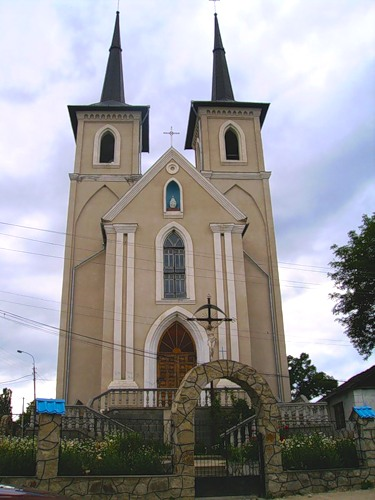
- A church in Nova Ushytsia

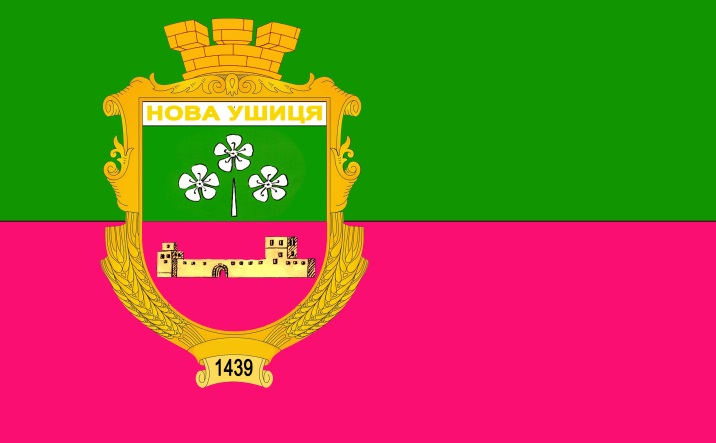
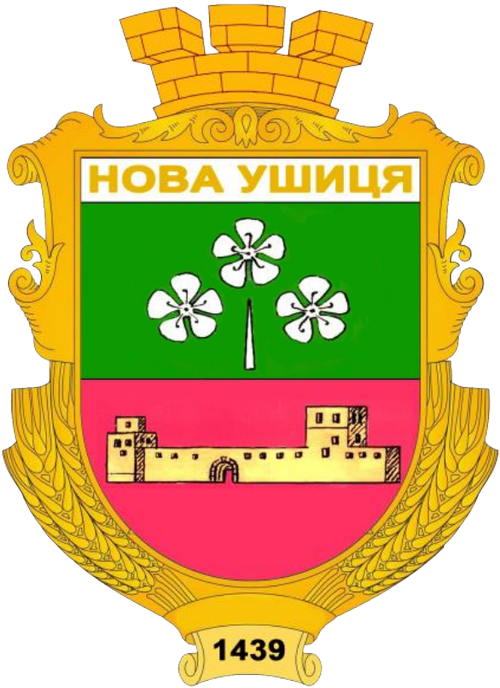
- Flag Coat of arms

- Location of Nova Ushytsia in Khmelnytskyi Oblast Nova Ushytsia (Ukraine)
- Coordinates: 48°50′06″N 27°16′17″E
- Country: Ukraine
- Oblast: Khmelnytskyi Oblast
- Raion: Kamianets-Podilskyi Raion
- Hromada: Nova Ushytsia settlement hromada
- Founded: 1439
- Town status: 1702

Government
  - Town Head: Anatoly Oliinyk

Area
  - Total: 4.56 km^{2} (1.76 sq mi)
- Elevation: 273 m (896 ft)

Population (2022)
  - Total: 3,880 ▼
  - Density: 851/km^{2} (2,200/sq mi)
- Time zone: UTC+2 (EET)
  - Summer (DST): UTC+3 (EEST)
- Postal code: 32600
- Area code: +380 3847
- Website: https://novagromada.gov.ua/

Nova Ushytsia (Ukrainian: Нова Ушиця; Yiddish: נײַ־אושיצע, romanized: Nay-Ushitze; Russian: Новая Ушица) is a rural settlement in Kamianets-Podilskyi Raion, Khmelnytskyi Oblast, western Ukraine. It hosts the administration of Nova Ushytsia settlement hromada, one of the hromadas of Ukraine. The settlement's population was 4,557 as of the 2001 Ukrainian Census. Current population: 3,880 (2022 estimate).

The city is located in the historical region of Podolia.

== History ==
=== Ancient history ===
The area where Nova Ushytsia is located has been inhabited for thousands of years. An excavation of Kosykivtsi, a nearby village, found polished stone axes that were dated to the Bronze Age, around the 2nd millennium, B.C.

=== Under Polish sovereignty ===
The settlement was founded in 1439 as Litnivtsi (Ukrainian: Літнівці; Polish: Letniowce) and was part of the Podolian Voivodeship of the Kingdom of Poland. The first mention of the city came in the form of the 1439 royal charter that granted the town, as well as Verbovets to Polish-Lithuanian nobleman Petras Gedgaudas. for the price of 40 hyrvnias. Nobleman Stanisław Odrowąż was given rights to the land in the 16th century.

During the mid-17th century Khmelnitsky Uprising, the town was often battleground or a border to it during battles between the Cossacks and the Polish Army.

From 1702 to 1703, Litnivtsi was granted the Magdeburg rights. It was a royal city of Poland under declaration of Augustus III. The city later fell under control of the Russian Empire in 1793 after the second partition of Poland, and became part of the Podolia Governorate, located inside of the Ushitsky uyezd.

=== Under Russian sovereignty ===
Under Russian sovereignty, the city transferred to various governors throughout its early history, such as to Governor Vladimir Chevkin in 1808.

In 1829, Litnivtsi was renamed to "Nova Ushytsia" (New Ushytsia) to differentiate it with the town of Stara Ushytsia (Old Ushytsia). The city was considered an important location, as it was part of the postal route between Mohyliv-Podilskyi to Husiatyn.

By 1896, Nova Ushytsia was a district down in Podolia and contained: five water milles, a candle and sugar factory, a yeast factory, a primary school for boys and girls, a hospital, pharmacy, printing press, Orthodox and Catholic Church, a synagogue, and three Jewish prayer houses. By that year, it had a population of 5,821, consisting of a Jewish majority (2,979), and a minority of Orthodox Christians (1,886), Catholics (783), Schismatics (115), and Protestants (42).

In 1902, a parochial and secondary school were established in the community.

In 1924, the town was granted the status of an urban-type settlement after it became the Nova Ushytsia Raion's administrative center under the Ukraine USSR.

In 1930, the first machine tractor station was approved for the district, implementing a system of 20 tractors.

Nazis occupied Nova Ushytsia from July 1941 to March 1944. Jews were transported to ghettos in September 1941, and mass executions in the town took place in summer of the following year.

=== Independent Ukraine ===
Until 18 July 2020, Nova Ushytsia was the administrative center of Nova Ushytsia Raion. The raion was abolished in July 2020 as part of the administrative reform of Ukraine, which reduced the number of raions of Khmelnytskyi Oblast to three. The area of Nova Ushytsia Raion was merged into Kamianets-Podilskyi Raion.

Until 26 January 2024, Nova Ushytsia was designated urban-type settlement. On this day, a new law entered into force which abolished this status, and Nova Ushytsia became a rural settlement.

== Demography ==
Historical population

Year	Pop.	±%
1820	388	—
1858	3,933	+913.7%
1870	4,502	+14.5%
1896	5,821	+29.3%

Year	Pop.	±%
1897	6,371	+9.4%
1989	4,851	−23.9%
2013	4,353	−10.3%
2022	3,880	−10.9%

Source: Imperial revision lists, All-Russian 1897 census, Soviet census, Ukraine census

== Geography ==
Nova Ushytsia is located on the Kalyus River, a tributary of the Dniester. It is located 48 km from the Dunaivtsi railway station on the Yarmolyntsi-Larga line.

=== Climate ===
Climate data for Nova Ushytsia (1981–2010)
Month	Jan	Feb	Mar	Apr	May	Jun	Jul	Aug	Sep	Oct	Nov	Dec	Year
Mean daily maximum °C (°F)	−0.8 (30.6)	0.6 (33.1)	6.1 (43.0)	14.1 (57.4)	20.6 (69.1)	23.2 (73.8)	25.2 (77.4)	24.7 (76.5)	19.3 (66.7)	13.0 (55.4)	5.3 (41.5)	0.1 (32.2)	12.6 (54.7)
Daily mean °C (°F)	−3.6 (25.5)	−2.7 (27.1)	1.9 (35.4)	8.8 (47.8)	14.7 (58.5)	17.5 (63.5)	19.4 (66.9)	18.8 (65.8)	13.8 (56.8)	8.3 (46.9)	2.2 (36.0)	−2.4 (27.7)	8.1 (46.6)
Mean daily minimum °C (°F)	−6.2 (20.8)	−5.6 (21.9)	−1.6 (29.1)	4.1 (39.4)	9.3 (48.7)	12.3 (54.1)	14.2 (57.6)	13.5 (56.3)	9.3 (48.7)	4.5 (40.1)	−0.4 (31.3)	−4.6 (23.7)	4.1 (39.4)
Average precipitation mm (inches)	33.9 (1.33)	37.5 (1.48)	31.1 (1.22)	47.3 (1.86)	64.8 (2.55)	91.7 (3.61)	106.8 (4.20)	72.6 (2.86)	56.6 (2.23)	33.3 (1.31)	41.8 (1.65)	39.5 (1.56)	656.9 (25.86)
Average precipitation days (≥ 1.0 mm)	8.2	8.9	7.5	7.7	9.6	9.7	10.2	7.3	7.5	6.6	8.2	9.2	100.6
Average relative humidity (%)	84.1	81.7	76.0	67.2	65.7	71.5	72.4	71.3	74.8	78.8	85.0	86.7	76.3
Mean monthly sunshine hours	52.8	74.1	126.5	176.1	269.2	260.4	270.4	259.7	183.9	132.0	59.2	42.0	1,906.3
Source: World Meteorological Organization
