= Stara Ushytsia =

Rural locality in Khmelnytskyi Oblast, Ukraine

Stara Ushytsia Стара Ушиця
- Rural settlement
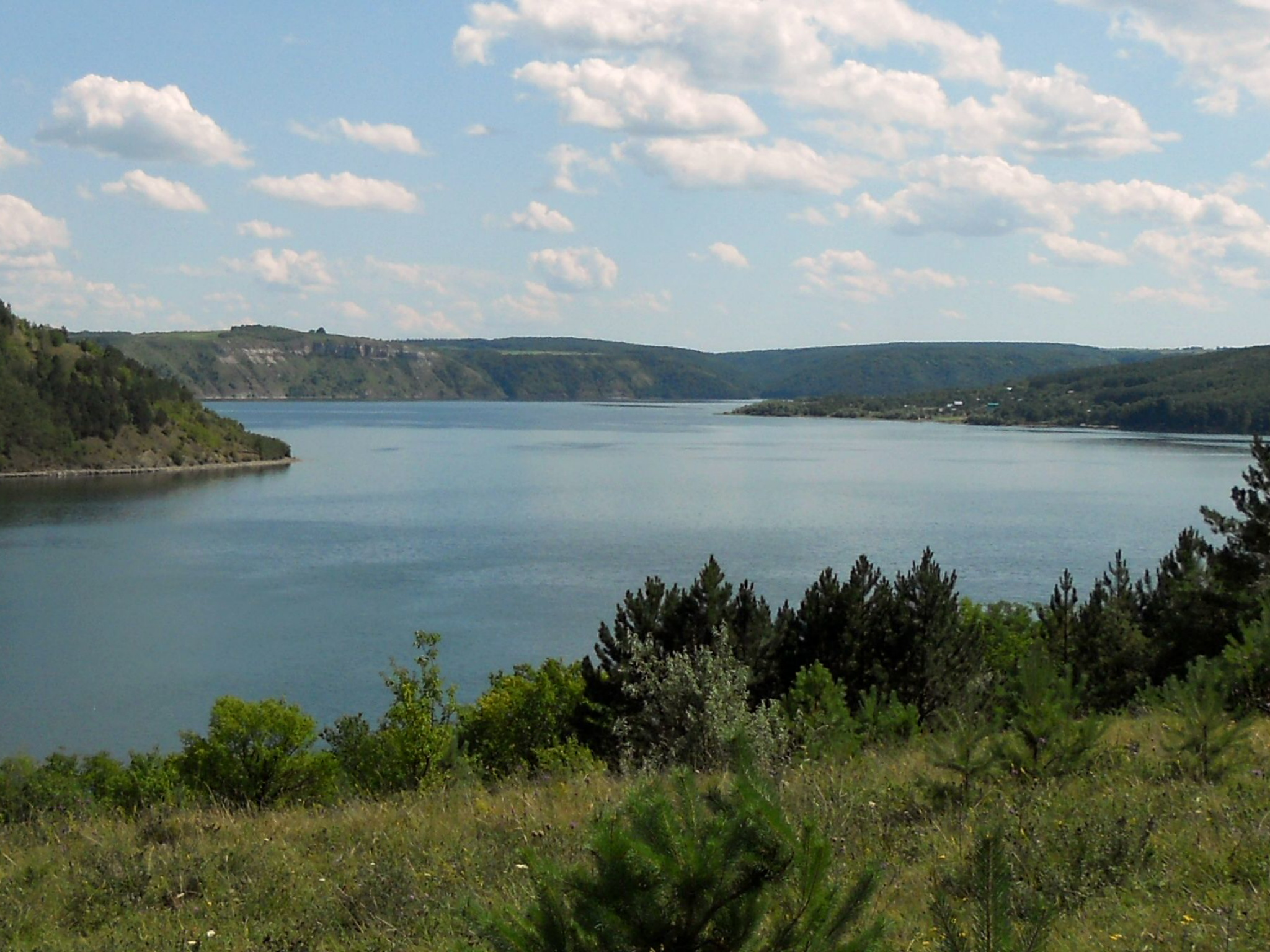
- The Dnister River and surrounding Podolian landscape near Stara Ushytsia.

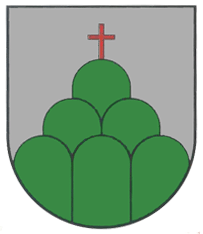
- Coat of arms

- Location within Khmelnytskyi Oblast Location within Ukraine
- Coordinates: 48°35′48″N 27°04′25″E
- Country: Ukraine
- Oblast: Khmelnytskyi Oblast
- Raion: Kamianets-Podilskyi Raion
- Hromada: Stara Ushytsia settlement hromada
- Founded: 1144
- Town status: 1924

Government
  - Town Head: Vasyl Matskov

Area
  - Total: 5.07 km^{2} (1.96 sq mi)
- Elevation: 255 m (837 ft)

Population (2022)
  - Total: 2,057 ▼
  - Density: 406/km^{2} (1,050/sq mi)
- Time zone: UTC+2 (EET)
  - Summer (DST): UTC+3 (EEST)
- Postal code: 32385
- Area code: +380 3849
- Website: http://rada.gov.ua/

Stara Ushytsia (Ukrainian: Стара Ушиця; Yiddish: אַלט־אישיצע / אישיצע; Russian: Старая Ушица) is a rural settlement in Kamianets-Podilskyi Raion, Khmelnytskyi Oblast, western Ukraine. Stara Ushytsia hosts the administration of Stara Ushytsia settlement hromada, one of the hromadas of Ukraine. The settlement's population was 2,492 as of the 2001 Ukrainian Census. Current population: 2,057 (2022 estimate). 1,927 (2025 estimate).

== Geography ==
The town is situated on the banks of the Dnister River in the Podolian landscape. It is located near the National Environmental Park "Podilski Tovtry".

== History ==
The settlement was first mentioned in written documents in 1144 as Ushytsia (Ukrainian: Ушиця). Ushytsia was also granted the Magdeburg rights in 1144. In 1826, the settlement was renamed to "Stara Ushytsia" (Old Ushytsia) while the settlement of Litnivtsi was renamed Nova Ushytsia (New Ushytsia).

It was granted the status of an urban-type settlement in 1979. The town houses the Stara Ushytisa Settlement Council, which was founded in 1982. The council administers the town of Stara Ushytsia itself and the village of Horaivka. On 26 January 2024, a new law entered into force which abolished this status, and Stara Ushytsia became a rural settlement.

== Notable residents ==
- Dmitry Krasnov (born 1959), Russian politician
- Sarah Gorby (1900–1980), (Note: Gorby was from Kishinev, but her father's family came from Stara Ushytsia and she later came to France where she grew popular as a singer of Russian, Jewish, and Romani folk tunes) French-Jewish contralto singer
- Vladimir Bodnar (born 1942), Transnistrian politician

== See also ==
- Bakota, Ukraine, a former settlement near the town that houses an ancient cave monastery
