= Kamianets-Podilskyi Raion =

Subdivision of Khmelnytskyi Oblast, Ukraine

Kamianets-Podilskyi Raion Кам'янець-Подільський район
- Raion
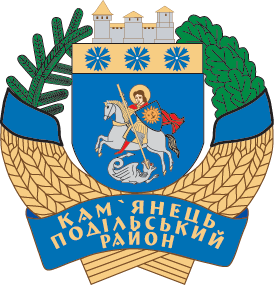
- Flag Coat of arms

- Interactive map of Kamianets-Podilskyi Raion
- Coordinates: 48°40′56″N 26°34′57″E
- Country: Ukraine
- Oblast: Khmelnytskyi Oblast
- Established: March 7, 1923
- Admin. center: Kamianets-Podilskyi
- Subdivisions: 15 hromadas

Government
  - Governor: Mykhailo Zheliznyk

Area
  - Total: 4,521 km^{2} (1,746 sq mi)

Population (2022)
  - Total: 279,789
  - Density: 61.89/km^{2} (160.3/sq mi)
- Time zone: UTC+02:00 (EET)
  - Summer (DST): UTC+03:00 (EEST)
- Postal index: 32319—32398
- Area code: +380 3849
- Website: http://kprda.gov.ua

Kamianets-Podilskyi Raion (Ukrainian: Кам'янець-Подільський район, romanized: Kamjanec'-Podil's'kyj rajon) is one of the three administrative raions (district) of Khmelnytskyi Oblast in western Ukraine. Its administrative center is located in the city of Kamianets-Podilskyi. Population: 279,789 (2022 estimate).

On 18 July 2020, as part of the administrative reform of Ukraine, the number of raions of Khmelnytskyi Oblast was reduced to three, and the area of Kamianets-Podilskyi Raion was significantly expanded. Three abolished raions, Chemerivtsi, Dunaivtsi, and Nova Ushytsia Raions, as well as the city of Kamianets-Podilskyi, which was previously incorporated as a city of oblast significance and did not belong to the raion, were merged into Kamianets-Podilskyi Raion. The January 2020 estimate of the raion population was 63,302 (2020 est.). Its population was 75,506 in the 2001 Ukrainian Census.

== Geography ==
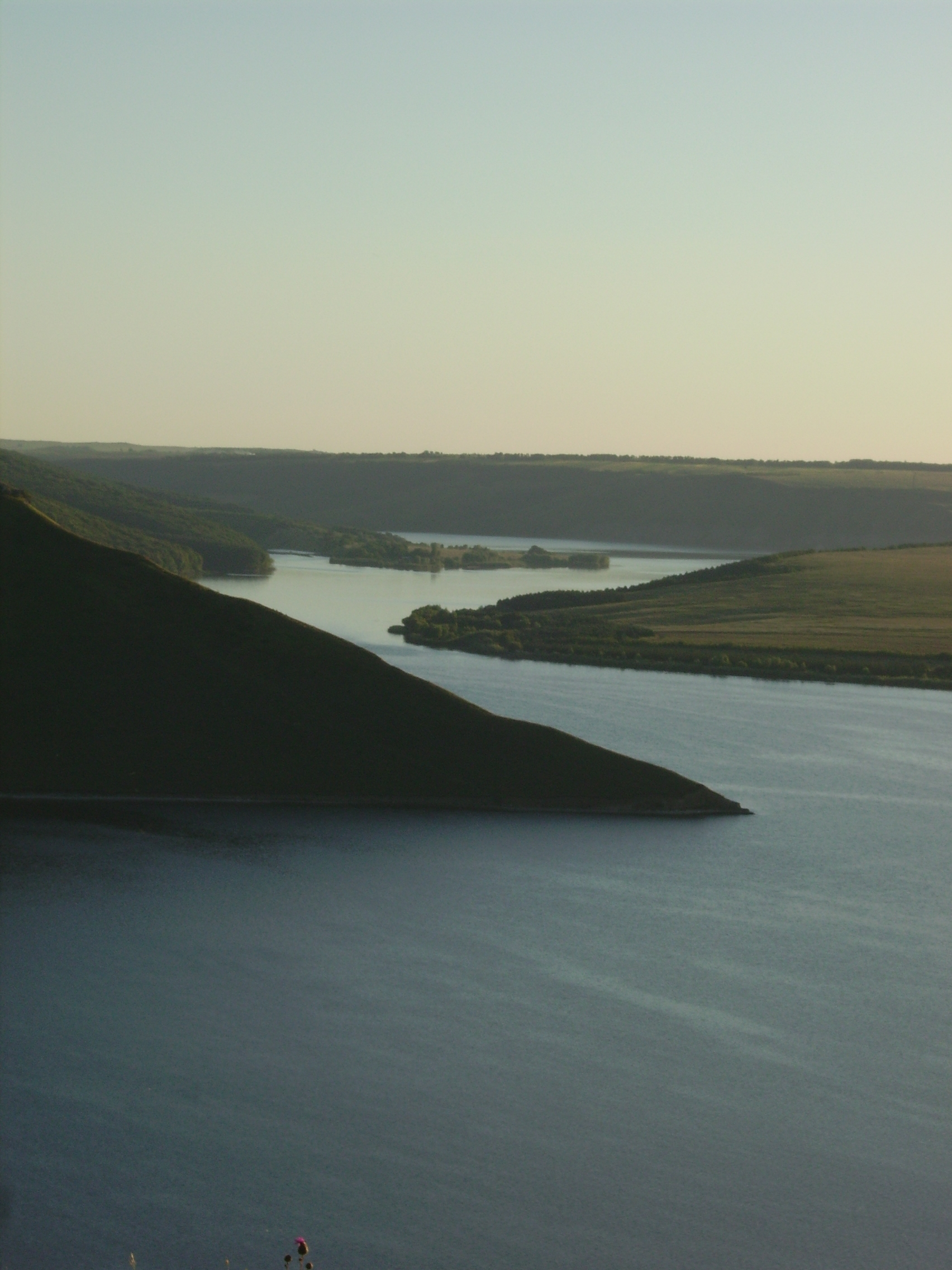
The ancient settlement of Bakota was submerged when the Dniester Reservoir was created in 1981. It is now an environmental preserve.

Kamianets-Podilskyi Raion is located in the southernmost part of the Khmelnytskyi Oblast, corresponding to the modern-day boundaries of Podolia historical region. To its west and south, the raion borders upon the Ternopil and Chernivtsi Oblasts, respectfully.

It is the largest raion of the oblast, with an area of 1,537 square kilometres (593 mi^{2}) constituting 7.5 percent of the oblast's area. A total of seven rivers flow through the raion, including the Dniester and Smotrych Rivers.

== History ==
Before the modern-day Kaimanets-Podilskyi Raion existed, a large portion of its current boundaries was under the control of other raions, one of which was Dovzhok Raion (Ukrainian: Довжоцький район), established on March 7, 1923 as part of an administrative reorganization of the Ukrainian Soviet Socialist Republic. Dovzhok Raion was one of 16 districts of the Kamianets Okruha (at the time okruhas were the first-level of administrative division of the Ukrainian SSR).

On December 4, 1928, the raion's administrative center was moved from the village of Dovzhok to Kamianets-Podilskyi, facilitating the renaming of the district to Kamianets-Podilskyi Raion. For the next few years the raion's territory kept expanding, until it was dissolved on December 26, 1934. At that time, the raion was placed under the jurisdiction of the Kamianets-Podilskyi City Municipality, although de facto the raion continued to exist. This decision was reversed on June 28, 1939, when Dovzhok Raion was re-established.

On July 10, 1944, the raion's administrative center was yet again moved to Kamianets-Podilskyi. Over the next 20 years, the raion's territory slowly kept expanding with the annexation of neighboring raion until January 4, 1965, when its modern-day boundaries were established.

== Subdivisions ==
=== Current ===
After the reform in July 2020, the raion consisted of 15 hromadas:

- Chemerivtsi settlement hromada with the administration in the rural settlement of Chemerivtsi, transferred from Chemerivtsi Raion;
- Dunaivtsi urban hromada with the administration in the city of Dunaivtsi, transferred from Dunaivtsi Raion;
- Hukiv rural hromada with the administration in the selo of Hukiv, transferred from Chemerivtsi Raion;
- Humentsi rural hromada with the administration in the selo of Humentsi, retained from Kamianets-Podilskyi Raion;
- Kamianets-Podilskyi urban hromada with the administration in the city of Kamianets-Podilskyi, transferred from the city of oblast significance of Kamianets-Podilskyi;
- Kytaihorod rural hromada with the administration in the selo of Kytaihorod, retained from Kamianets-Podilskyi Raion;
- Makiv rural hromada with the administration in the selo of Makiv, transferred from Dunaivtsi Raion;
- Nova Ushytsia settlement hromada with the administration in the rural settlement of Nova Ushytsia, transferred from Nova Ushytsia Raion;
- Novodunaivtsi settlement hromada with the administration in the rural settlement of Dunaivtsi, transferred from Dunaivtsi Raion;
- Orynyn rural hromada with the administration in the selo of Orynyn, retained from Kamianets-Podilskyi Raion;
- Slobidka-Kulchiievetska rural hromada with the administration in the selo of Slobidka-Kulchiievetska, retained from Kamianets-Podilskyi Raion;
- Smotrych settlement hromada with the administration in the rural settlement of Smotrych, transferred from Dunaivtsi Raion;
- Stara Ushytsia settlement hromada with the administration in the rural settlement of Stara Ushytsia, retained from Kamianets-Podilskyi Raion;
- Zakupne settlement hromada with the administration in the rural settlement of Zakupne, transferred from Chemerivtsi Raion;
- Zhvanets rural hromada with the administration in the selo of Zhvanets, retained from Kamianets-Podilskyi Raion.

=== Before 2020 ===
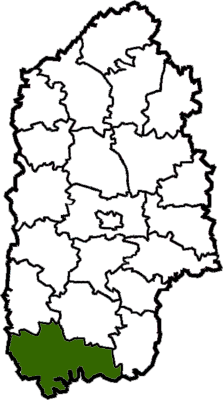
Kamianets-Podilskyi Raion in Khmelnytskyi Oblast (1966-2020)

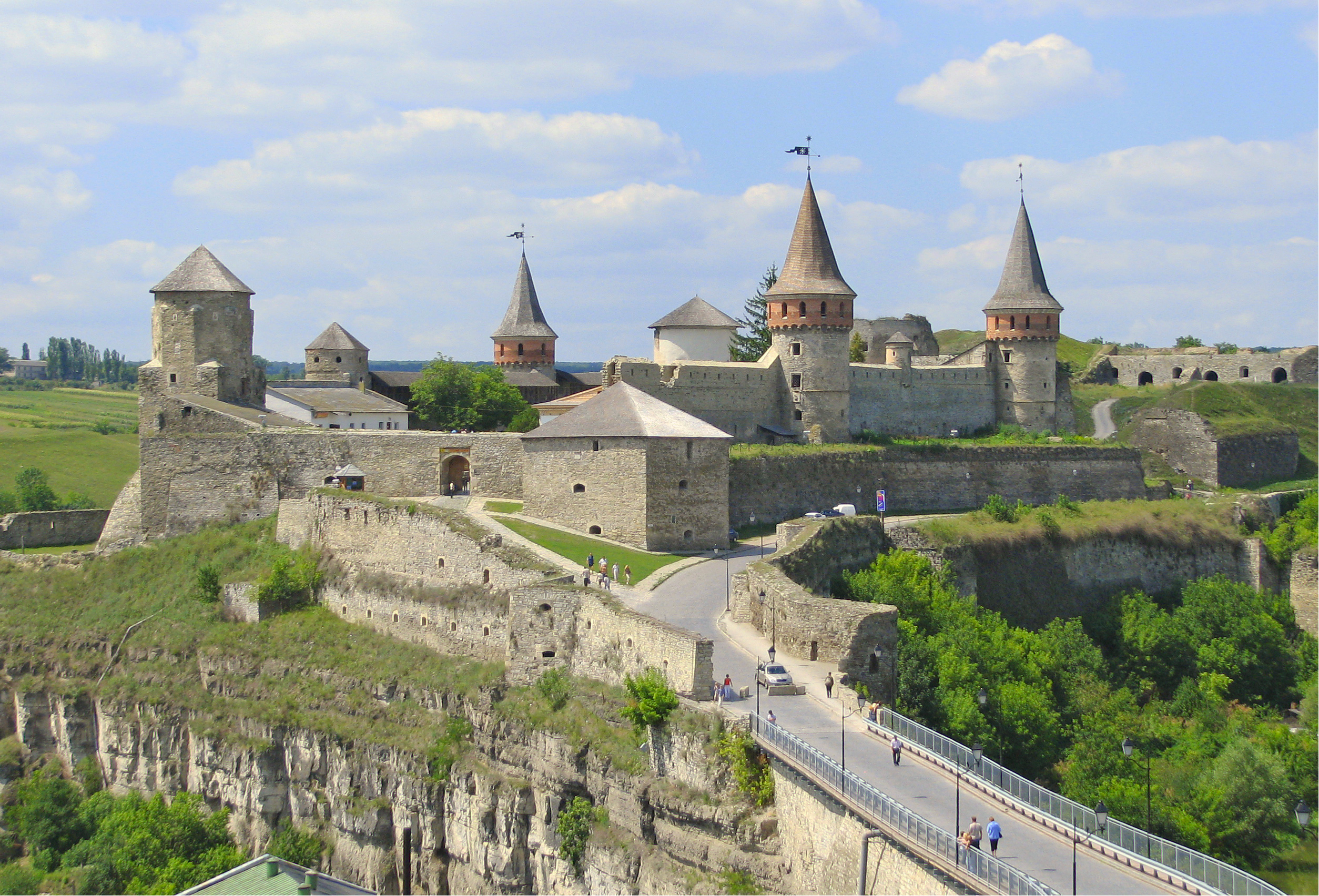
The Kamianets-Podilskyi Castle is one of the nation's main tourist attractions.

The Kamianets-Podilskyi Raion is divided in a way that follows the general administrative scheme in Ukraine. Local government is also organized along a similar scheme nationwide. Consequently, raions were subdivided into councils, which were the prime level of administrative division in the country.

Each of the raion's urban localities administered their own councils, often containing a few other villages within its jurisdiction. However, only a small amount of rural localities were organized into councils, which might also contain a few villages within its jurisdiction.

Accordingly, the Kamianets-Podilskyi Raion was divided into:

- 1 settlement council—made up of the urban-type settlement of Stara Ushytsia;
- 42 village councils

Overall, before 2020 the raion had a total of 122 populated localities, consisting of one urban-type settlement, 120 villages, and one rural settlement.

Before the 2020 reform, the raion consisted of six hromadas:

- Humentsi rural hromada with the administration in Humentsi;
- Kytaihorod rural hromada with the administration in Kytaihorod;
- Orynyn rural hromada with the administration in Orynyn;
- Slobidka-Kulchiievetska rural hromada with the administration in Slobidka-Kulchiievetska;
- Stara Ushytsia settlement hromada with the administration in Stara Ushytsia;
- Zhvanets rural hromada with the administration in Zhvanets.

== Places of interest ==
- Kamianets-Podilskyi Old Town, the administrative center's old town neighborhood
- Kamianets-Podilskyi Castle, situated in the Smotrych River canyon in Kamianets-Podilskyi
- Podilski Tovtry National Nature Park, also shared with Khmelnytskyi Raion
- Bakota Cave Monastery, located in the former village of Bakota
