= Znamianka rural hromada =

Coordinates: 47°0′N 30°17′E

Znamianka rural hromada Знам'янська сільська громада
- Hromada
- Interactive map of Znamianka rural hromada
- Country: Ukraine
- Oblast: Odesa Oblast
- Raion: Berezivka Raion
- Admin. center: Konopliane

Area
  - Total: 411.7 km^{2} (159.0 sq mi)

Population (2020)
  - Total: 8,537
  - Density: 20.74/km^{2} (53.71/sq mi)
- CATOTTG code: UA51020070000019684
- Settlements: 17
- Rural settlements: 1
- Villages: 16
- Website: http://znamyanska.gromada.org.ua/

Znamianka rural hromada (Ukrainian: Знам'янська сільська громада) is a hromada in Berezivka Raion of Odesa Oblast in southwestern Ukraine. Population: 8,537 (2020 est.)

The hromada consists one rural settlement (Radisne) and 16 villages:

- Malozymenove
- Martsiyanove
- Novopetrivka
- Novostepanivka
- Novoyelyzavetivka
- Polino-Osypenkove
- Syritske Druhe
- Syritske Pershe
- Sofiivka
- Stara Yelyzavetivka
- Tsybulivka
- Velykozymenove
- Vorobiivka
- Vorobiove
- Yurasheve
- Znamianka (seat of administration)

== Links ==
- Знам'янська сільська ОТГ (Червонознам'янська) // Облікова картка на офіційному вебсайті Верховної Ради України.
- картка рішення облради
- картка рішення облради
- Знам'янська об'єднана територіальна громада
- Децентралізація влади: Знам'янська громада
