= Vovkove, Odesa Oblast =

Village in Odesa Oblast, Ukraine

Vovkove Вовкове
- Village
- Location within Odesa Oblast Location within Ukraine
- Coordinates: 47°00′50″N 30°39′54″E
- Country: Ukraine
- Oblast: Odesa Oblast
- Raion: Berezivka Raion
- Hromada: Konopliane rural hromada

Population (2001)
  - Total: 129
- Time zone: UTC+2 (EET (Kyiv))
  - Summer (DST): UTC+3 (EEST)

Vovkove (Ukrainian: Вовкове) is a village in Berezivka Raion of Odesa Oblast in Ukraine. It belongs to Konopliane rural hromada, one of the hromadas of Ukraine.

Epiphanius, Metropolitan of Kyiv and All Ukraine, was born in the village.

== History ==
Vovkove, known originally as Nei-Liebental, was founded in 1872 by German settlers from the Liebental colonies (now the villages of Velykodolynske and Malodolynske).

Until 18 July 2020, Vovkove belonged to Ivanivka Raion. The raion was abolished in July 2020 as part of the administrative reform of Ukraine, which reduced the number of raions of Odesa Oblast to seven. The area of Ivanivka Raion was merged into Berezivka Raion.

== Demographics ==
Native language as of the Ukrainian Census of 2001:

- Ukrainian 62.02%
- Romanian 36.43%
- Russian 0.78%
