= Radisne, Berezivka Raion, Odesa Oblast =

Rural locality in Odesa Oblast, Ukraine

Radisne Радісне
- Rural settlement
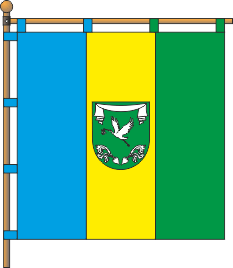
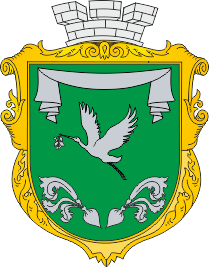
- Flag Coat of arms

- Location within Odesa Oblast Location within Ukraine
- Coordinates: 47°00′05″N 30°19′54″E
- Country: Ukraine
- Oblast: Odesa Oblast
- Raion: Berezivka Raion
- Hromada: Znamianka rural hromada

Population (2022)
  - Total: 1,496
- Time zone: UTC+2 (EET)
  - Summer (DST): UTC+3 (EEST)

Radisne (Ukrainian: Радісне, Russian: Радостное) is a rural settlement in Berezivka Raion of Odesa Oblast in Ukraine. It is located on the right bank of the Malyi Kuialnyk. Radisne belongs to Znamianka rural hromada, one of the hromadas of Ukraine. Population: 1,496 (2022 estimate)

== History ==
Until 18 July 2020, Radisne belonged to Ivanivka Raion. The raion was abolished in July 2020 as part of the administrative reform of Ukraine, which reduced the number of raions of Odesa Oblast to seven. The area of Ivanivka Raion was merged into Berezivka Raion.

Until 26 January 2024, Radisne was designated urban-type settlement. On this day, a new law entered into force which abolished this status, and Radisne became a rural settlement.

== Economy ==
=== Transportation ===
The closest railway station, right outside of the settlement, is Novoznamianka, on the line connecting Rozdilna and Ivanivka, however, there is no passenger navigation there. The closest stations with passenger navigation are on the line connecting Odesa with Podilsk vis Rozdilna.

Radisne has access to Highway M05 connecting Kyiv and Odesa.
