= Mykolaivka Raion =

Former subdivision of Odesa Oblast, Ukraine

Mykolaivka Raion Миколаївський район
- Raion
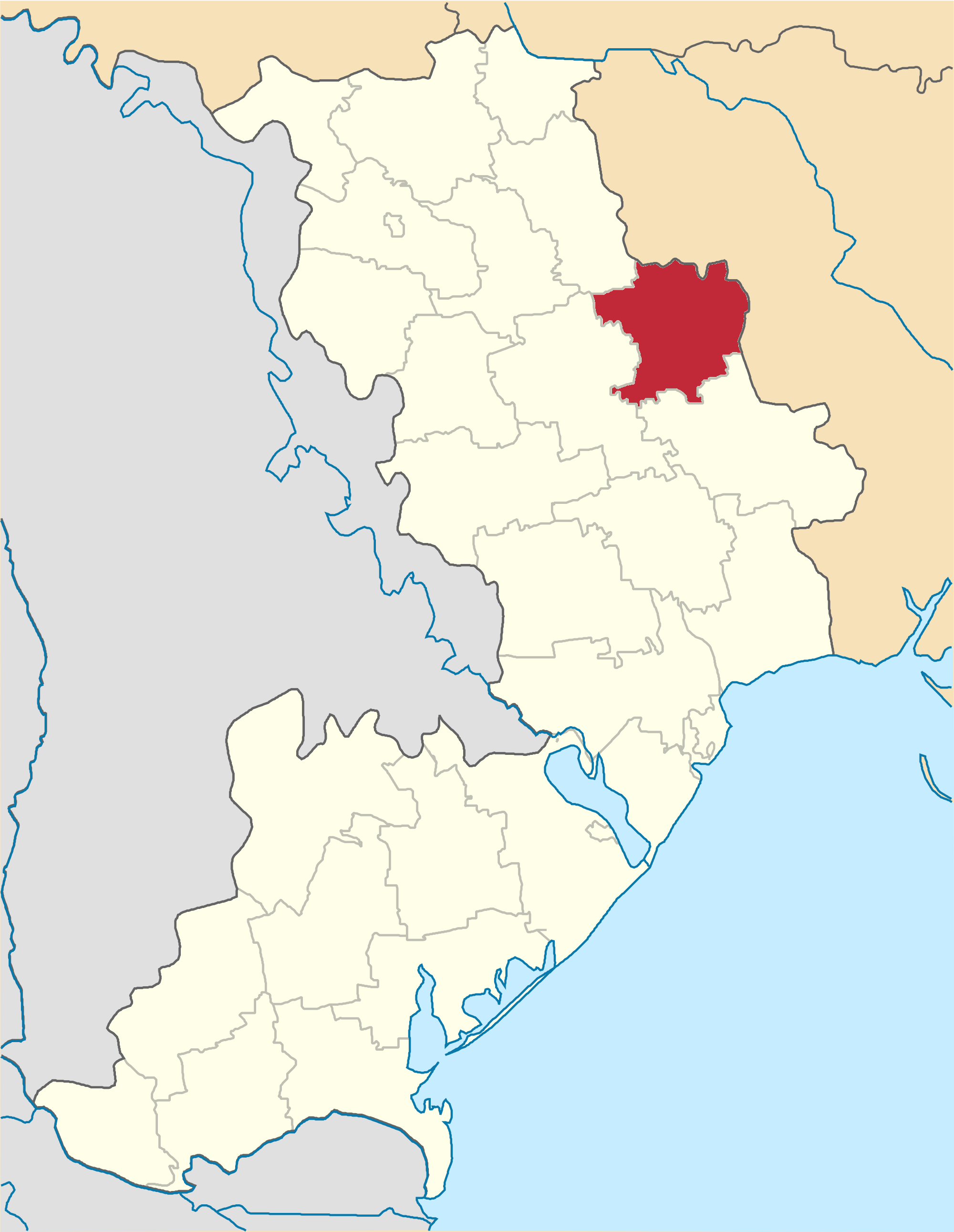
- Coordinates: 47°28′2″N 30°36′11″E
- Country: Ukraine
- Oblast: Odesa Oblast
- Established: 1946
- Disestablished: 18 July 2020
- Admin. center: Mykolaivka
- Subdivisions: List: 0 — city councils; 1 — settlement councils; 12 — rural councils; Number of localities: 0 — cities; 1 — urban-type settlements; 45 — villages; 0 — rural settlements

Government
  - Governor: Oleksandr Chornyi

Area
  - Total: 1,093 km^{2} (422 sq mi)

Population (2020)
  - Total: 15,399 ▼
  - Density: 14.09/km^{2} (36.49/sq mi)
- Time zone: UTC+02:00 (EET)
  - Summer (DST): UTC+03:00 (EEST)
- Postal index: 67000—67053
- Area code: +380 4857
- Website: http://mikolaivka-rda.odessa.gov.ua

Mykolaivka Raion (Ukrainian: Миколаївський район) was a raion (district) in Odesa Oblast of Ukraine. Its administrative center was the urban-type settlement of Mykolaivka. The raion was abolished on 18 July 2020 as part of the administrative reform of Ukraine, which reduced the number of raions of Odesa Oblast to seven. The area of Mykolaivka Raion was merged into Berezivka Raion. The last estimate of the raion population was 15,399 (2020 est.).

At the time of disestablishment, the raion consisted of three hromadas:

- Andriivo-Ivanivka rural hromada with the administration in the selo of Andriivo-Ivanivka;
- Mykolaivka settlement hromada with the administration in Mykolaivka;
- Striukove rural hromada with the administration in the selo of Striukove.
