= Chernove rural hromada =

Coordinates: 47°30′2.999″N 30°27′47.999″E

Chernove rural hromada Чернівська сільська громада
- Hromada
- Interactive map of Chernove rural hromada
- Country: Ukraine
- Oblast: Odesa Oblast
- Raion: Berezivka Raion
- Admin. center: Chernove

Area
  - Total: 180.42 km^{2} (69.66 sq mi)

Population (2019)
  - Total: 3,302
  - Density: 18.30/km^{2} (47.40/sq mi)
- CATOTTG code: UA51020010000012094
- Settlements: 12
- Villages: 12
- Website: https://andrievo-ivanivska-gromada.gov.ua/

Chernove rural hromada (Ukrainian: Чернівська сільська громада) is a hromada in Berezivka Raion of Odesa Oblast in southwestern Ukraine. Population: 3,302 (as of 2019).

The hromada consists of 12 villages:

- Bohdanivka
- Chernove (seat of administration)
- Dobrydnivka
- Isaieve
- Kakhovka
- Levadivka
- Nastasiivka
- Novohryhorivka
- Novotroitske
- Pishchana Petrivka
- Skosarivka
- Vesele

== Links ==
- https://act.cvk.gov.ua/acts/pro-pershi-vibori-deputativ-silskih-selishhnih-miskoi-rad-ob-iednanih-teritorialnih-gromad-i-vidpovidnih-silskih-selishhnih-miskogo-goliv-22-grudnya-2019-roku.html
- https://decentralization.gov.ua/gromada/1655#
- https://gromada.info/gromada/andrievo-ivanivska/
- https://dair.odessa.gov.ua/info/novini1/v-odeskj-oblast-triva-proces-utvorennya-otg/
