= Giżycki Manor =

Castle in Ukraine

- Садиба Ґіжицьких
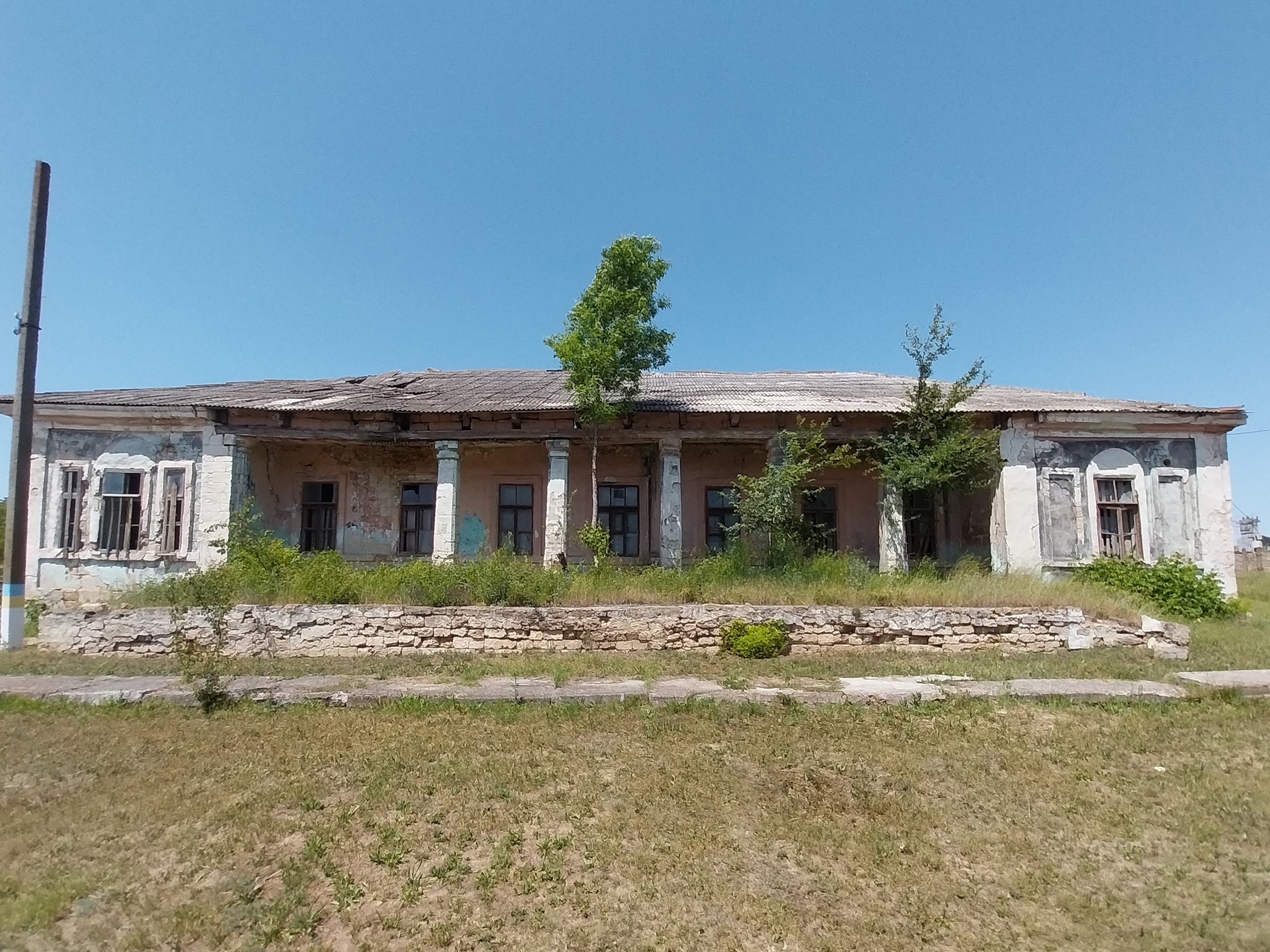
- Modern view of the manor
- Interactive map of the Giżycki Manor area

General information
- Status: ruins
- Location: Riasnopil, Odesa Oblast, Ukraine
- Coordinates: 47.075692°N 31.183119°E
- Client: Ignacy Giżycki

The Giżycki Manor is an architectural monument located in the village of Riasnopil, Berezivka Raion, Odesa Oblast, Ukraine. The manor was built by Russian general of Polish origin, Ignacy Giżycki, at the end of 19th century.

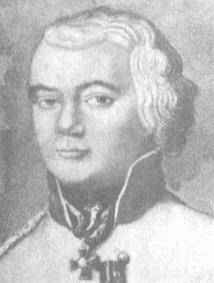
General Ignacy Giżycki

In 1905 the manor was owned by countess Arkudinska. After 1918 the village club was organised in the manor, but later it was used as school building. Now the manor building is partly destroyed, used as the school warehouse.

== Gallery ==
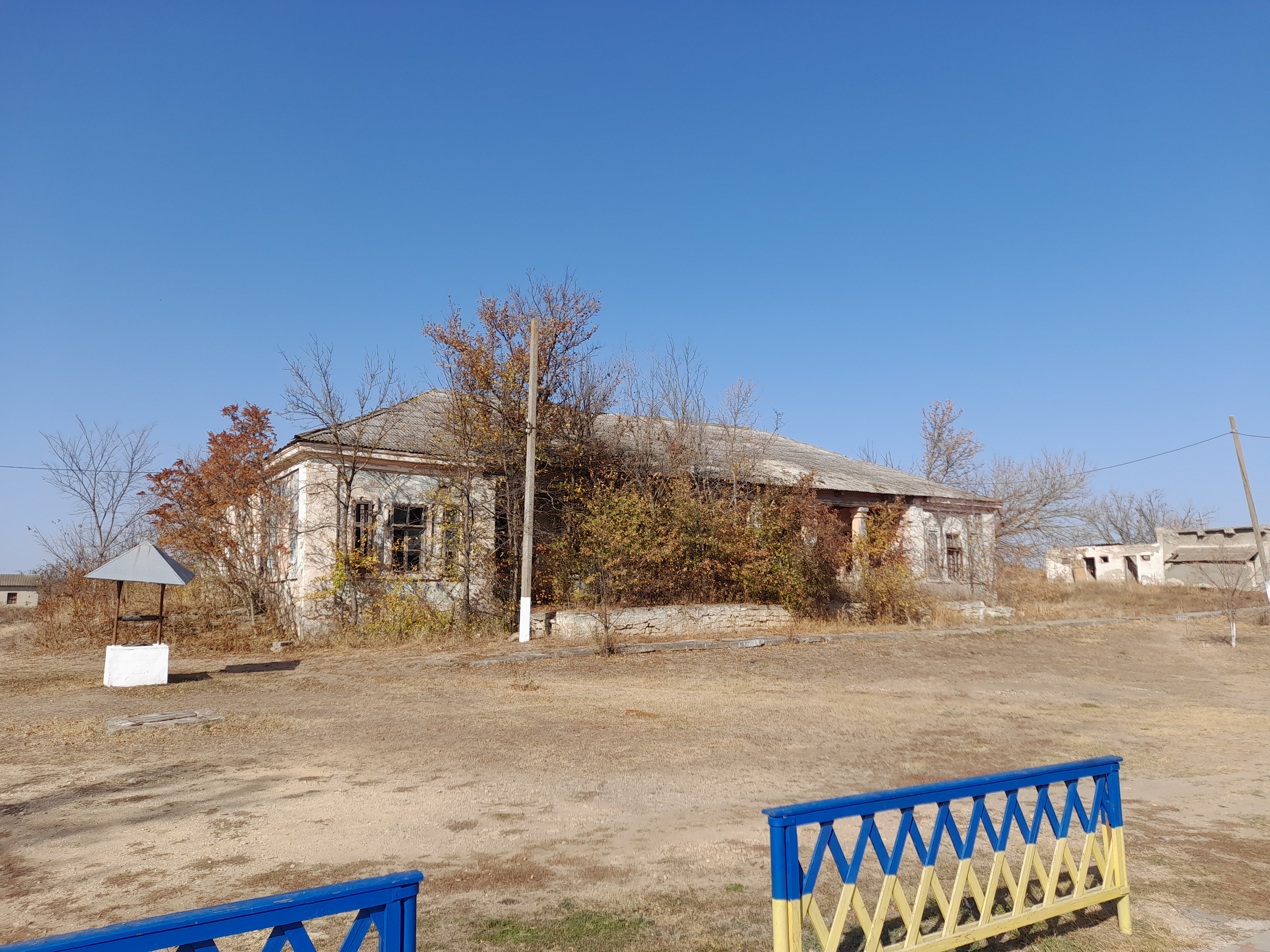
Total view of the manor

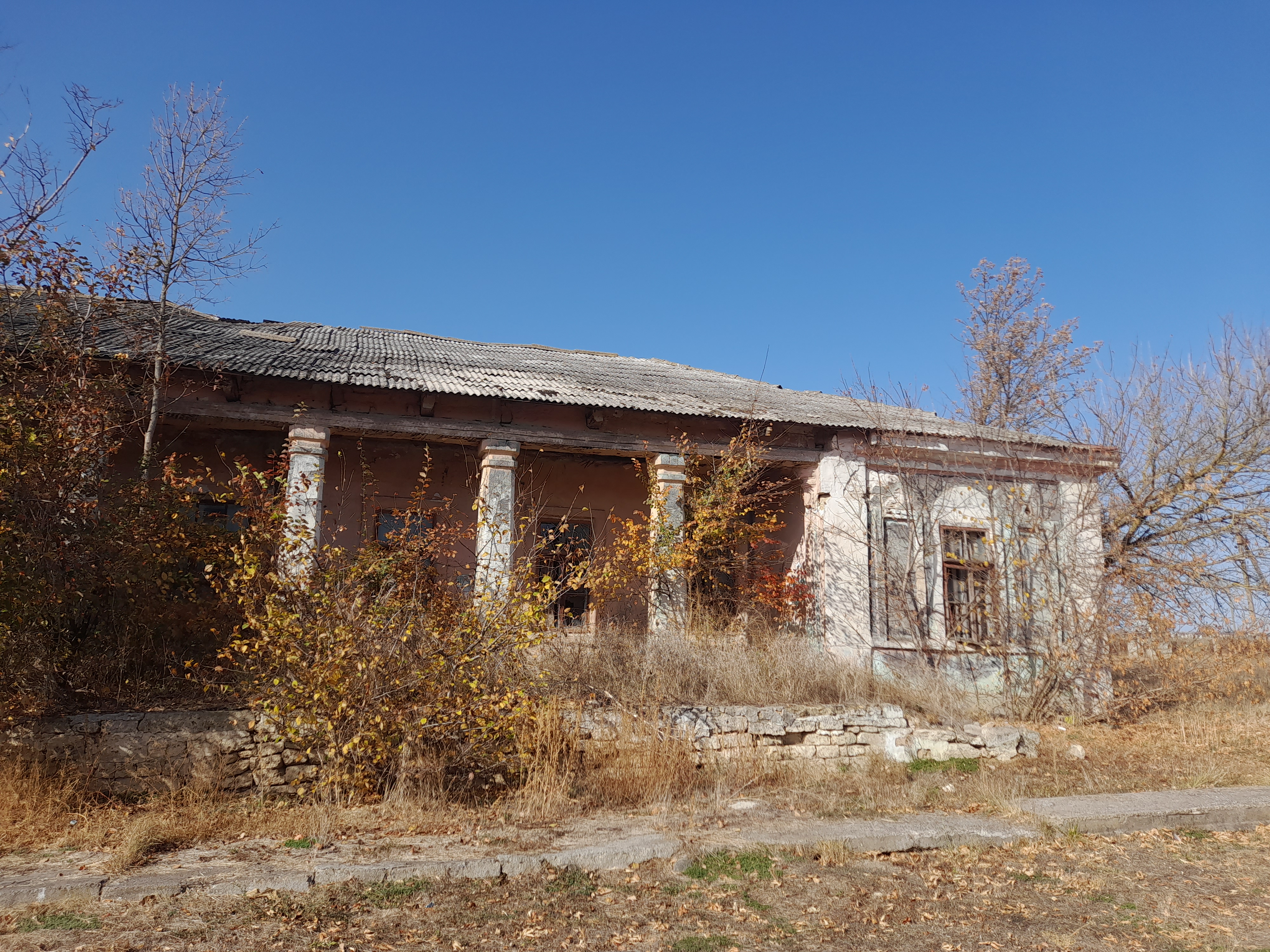

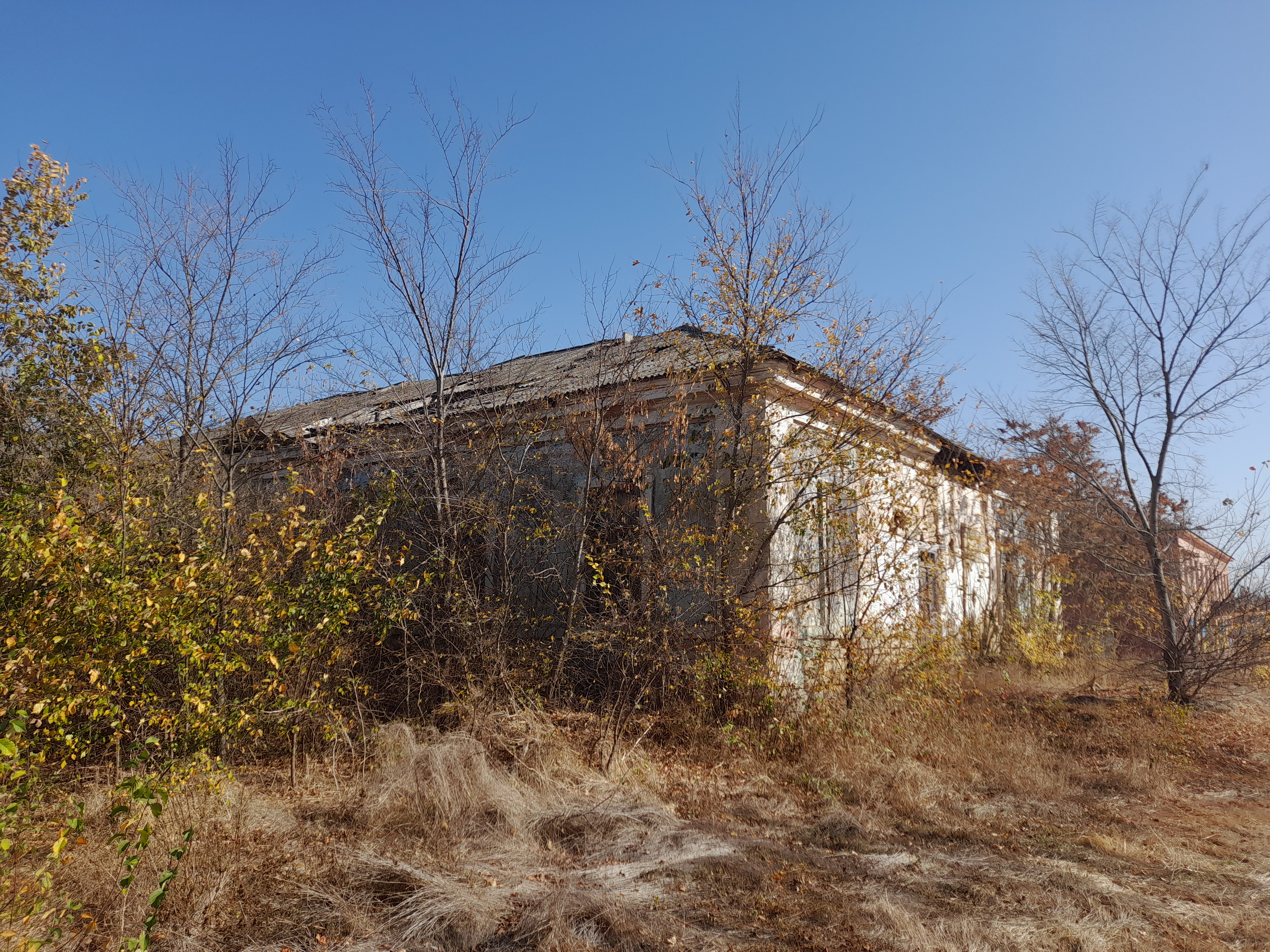

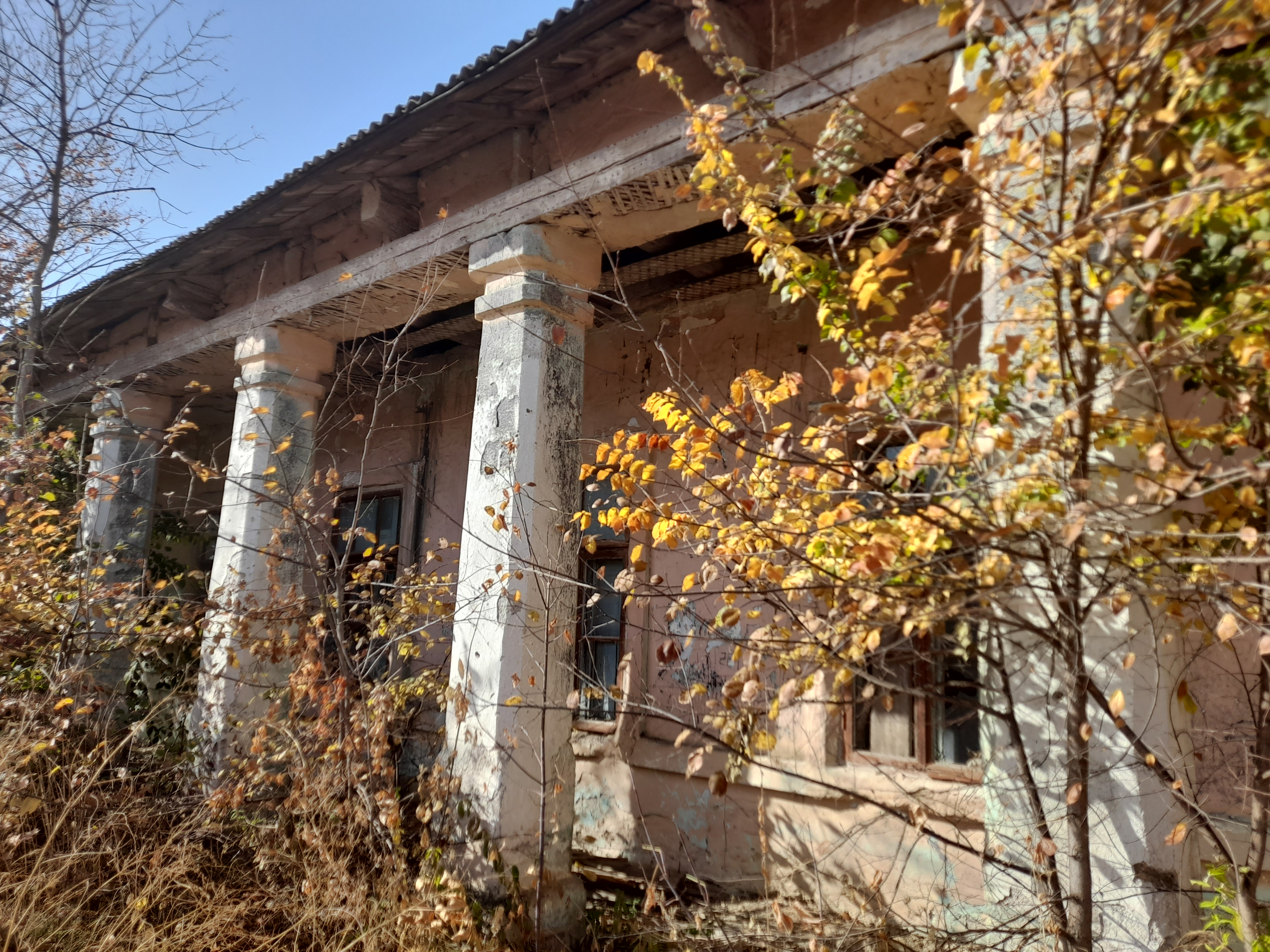

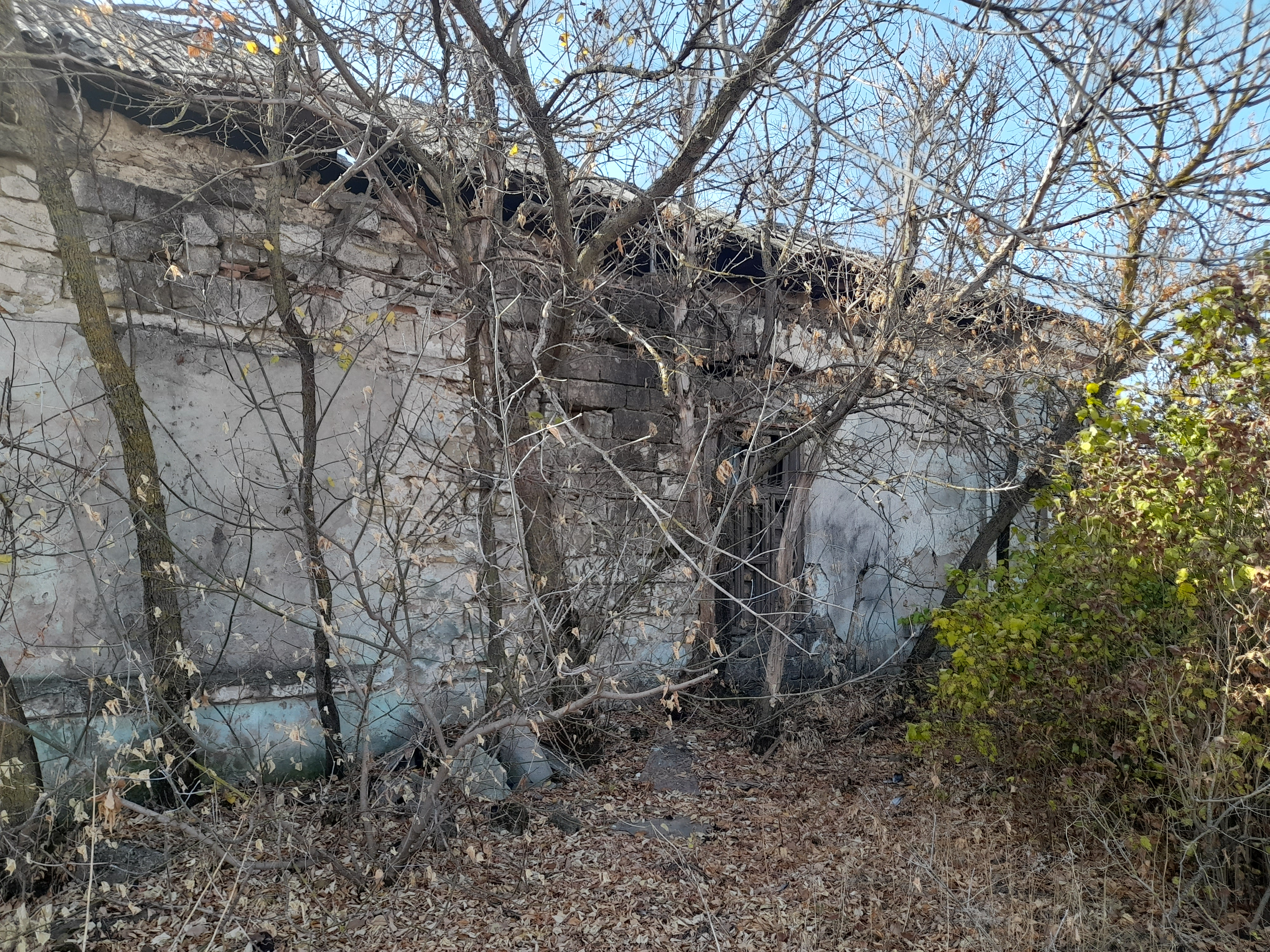

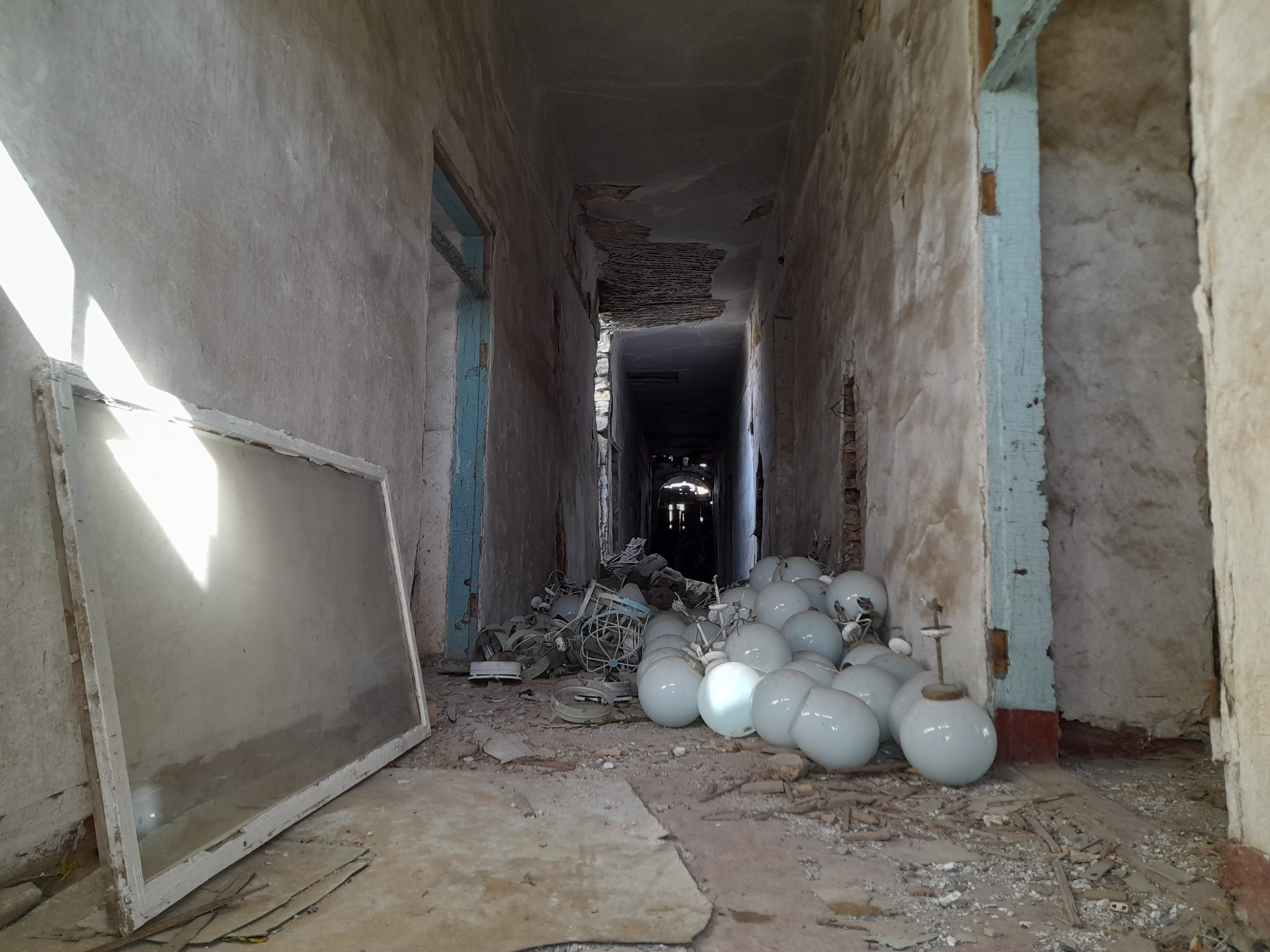
Manor interiour

== Sources ==
- https://uc.od.ua/columns/sergelmira/1226735
