= Kuris Palace in Isaieve =

Castle in Ukraine

Kuris Palace
- Ісаєвський палац Курісів
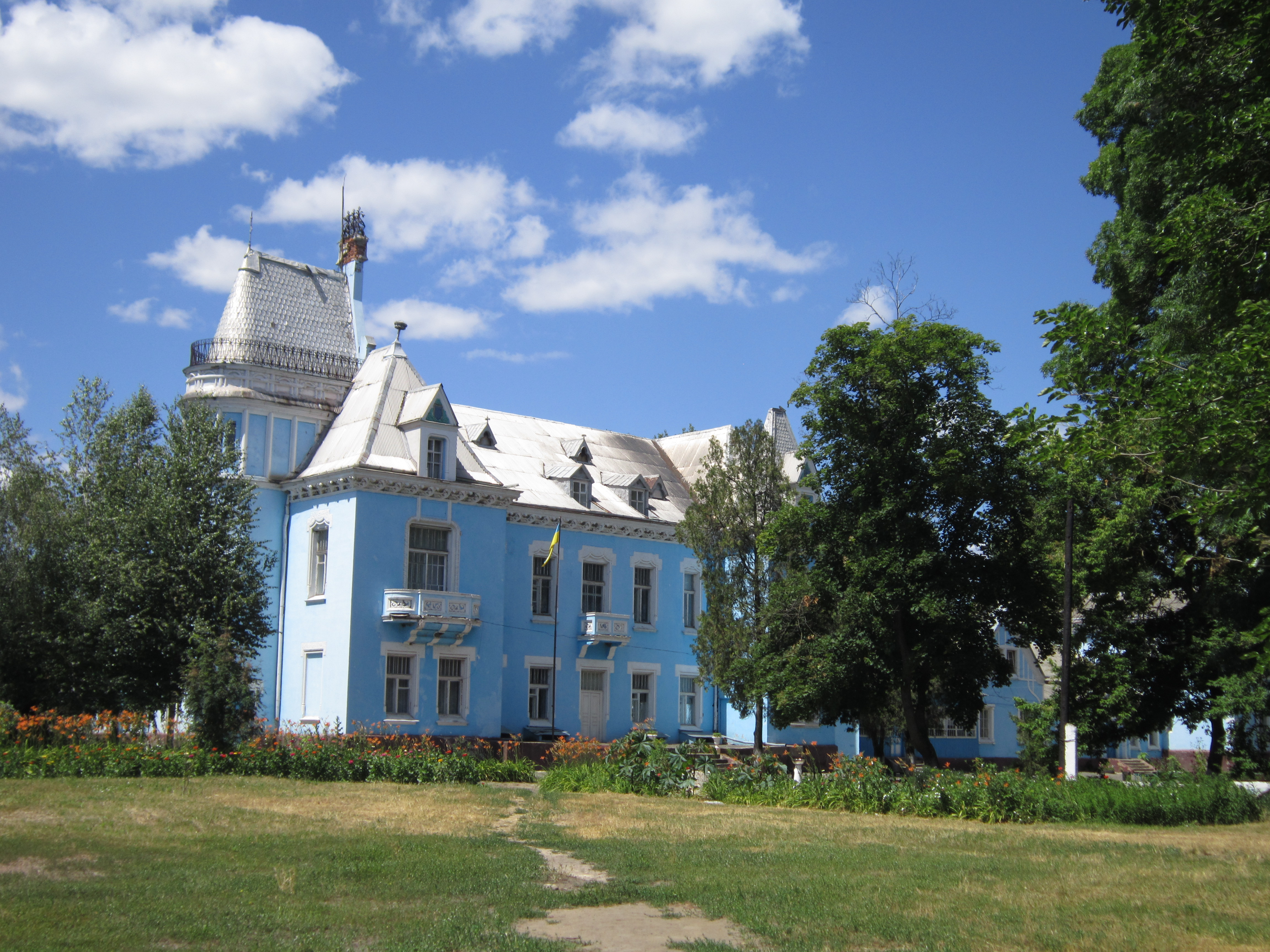
- Modern view of the palace
- Interactive map of the Kuris Palace area
- Alternative names: Палац Куріса, Палац-Садиба Курісів

General information
- Status: lyceum
- Location: Isaieve, Odesa Oblast, Ukraine
- Coordinates: 47.48025°N 30.490056°E
- Construction started: 1903
- Opened: 1905
- Client: Oleksandr Kuris

The Kuris Palace is an architectural monument located in the village of Isaieve, Berezivka Raion, Odesa Oblast, Ukraine. The manor was built between 1903 and 1905. Now it is used by the local lyceum.

The Kuris Palace was entered into the register of cultural heritage of Ukraine on 27 December 1991, as a monument of urban planning and architecture of local importance. The Isaieve Professional Agricultural Lyceum operates in the premises of the palace, the closed territory of which should be entered in order to see the palace itself. A park has been preserved around the palace.

Over the past hundred years, the palace has undergone many changes. The color of its walls changed from pink to blue, the central entrance with stairs was closed. However, several stained glass windows, a wooden staircase, stucco decoration on the ceiling, and decorative tiles on the floor have been preserved in the palace.

== Gallery ==
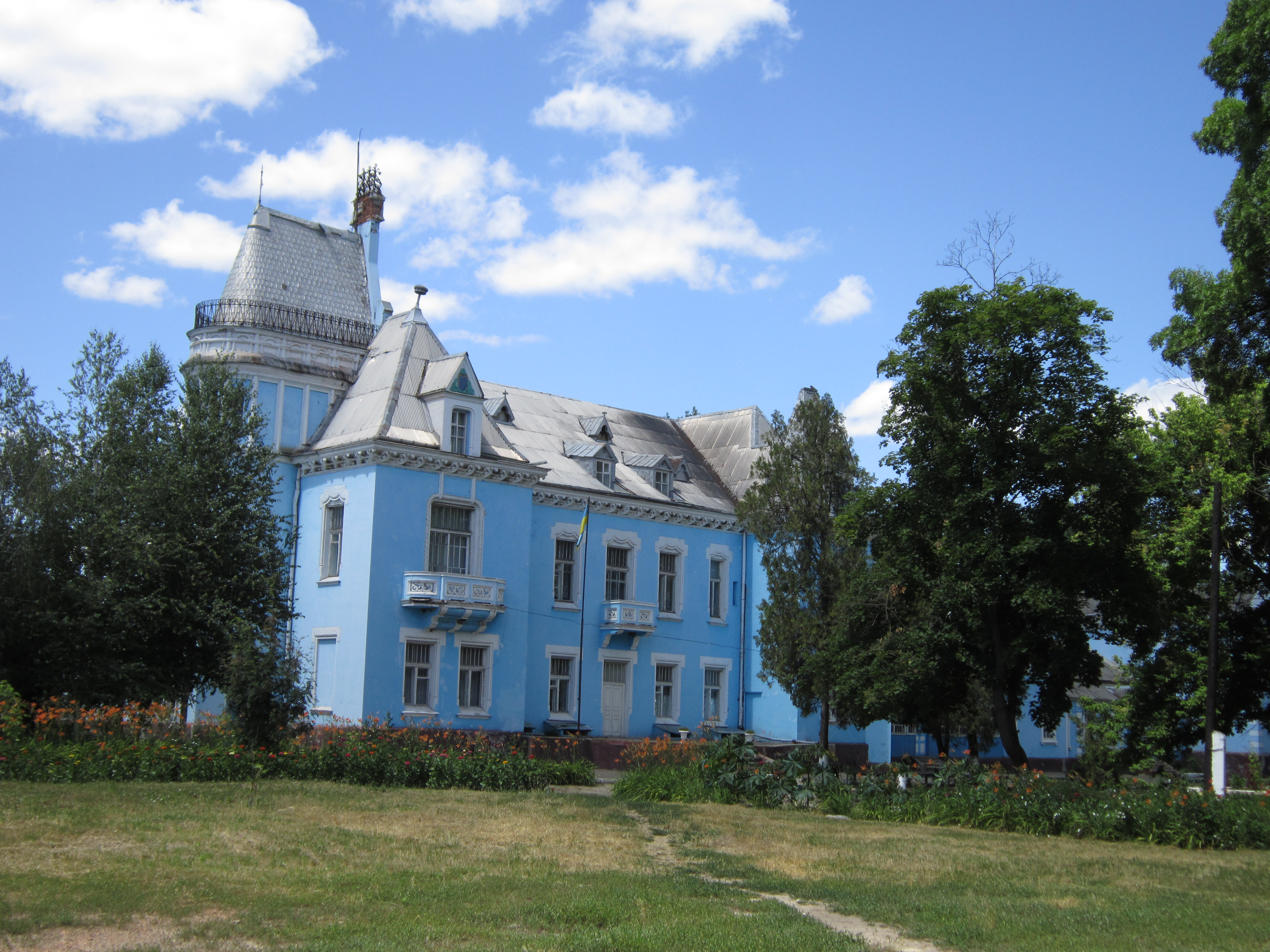
Total view

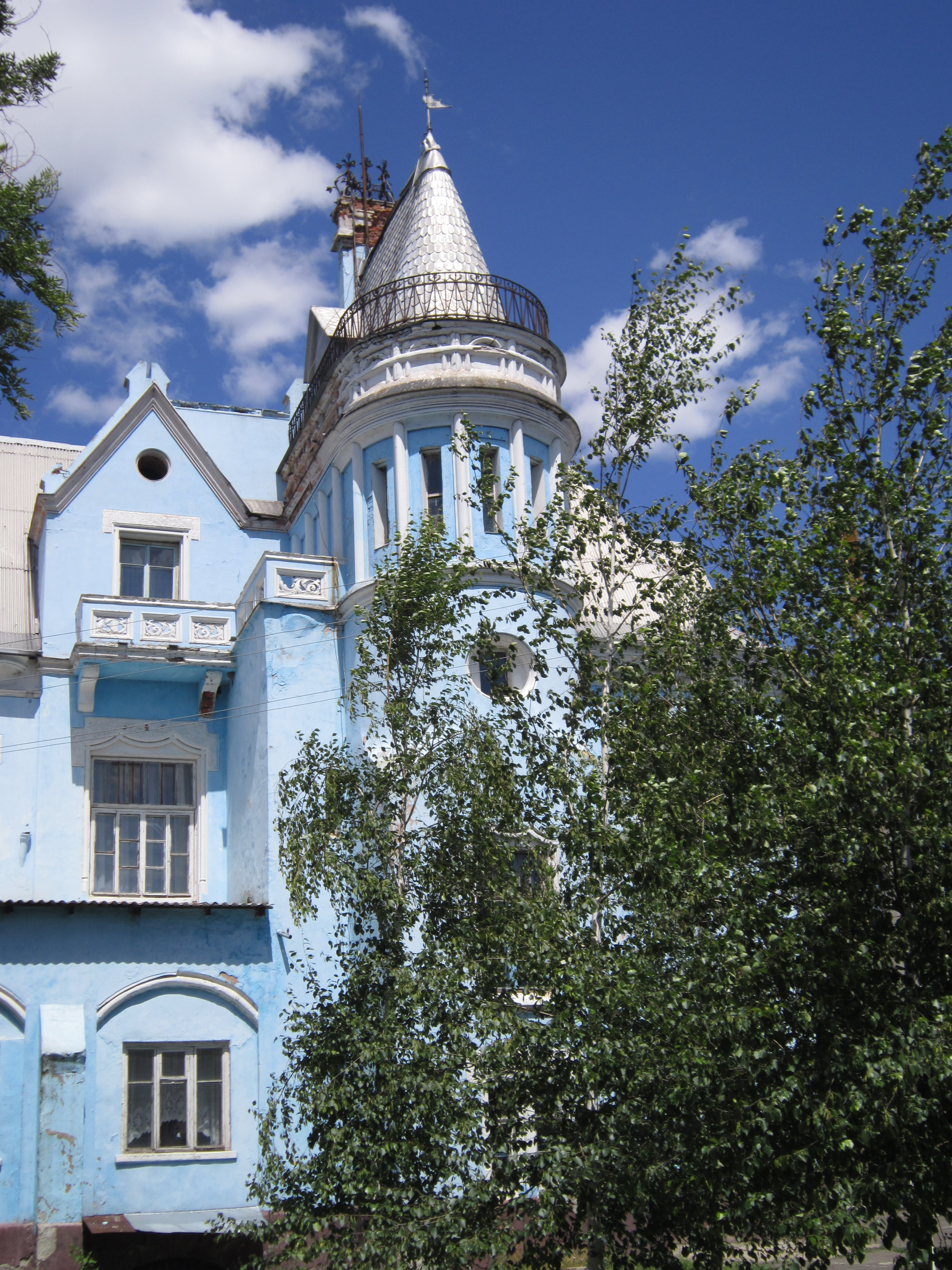

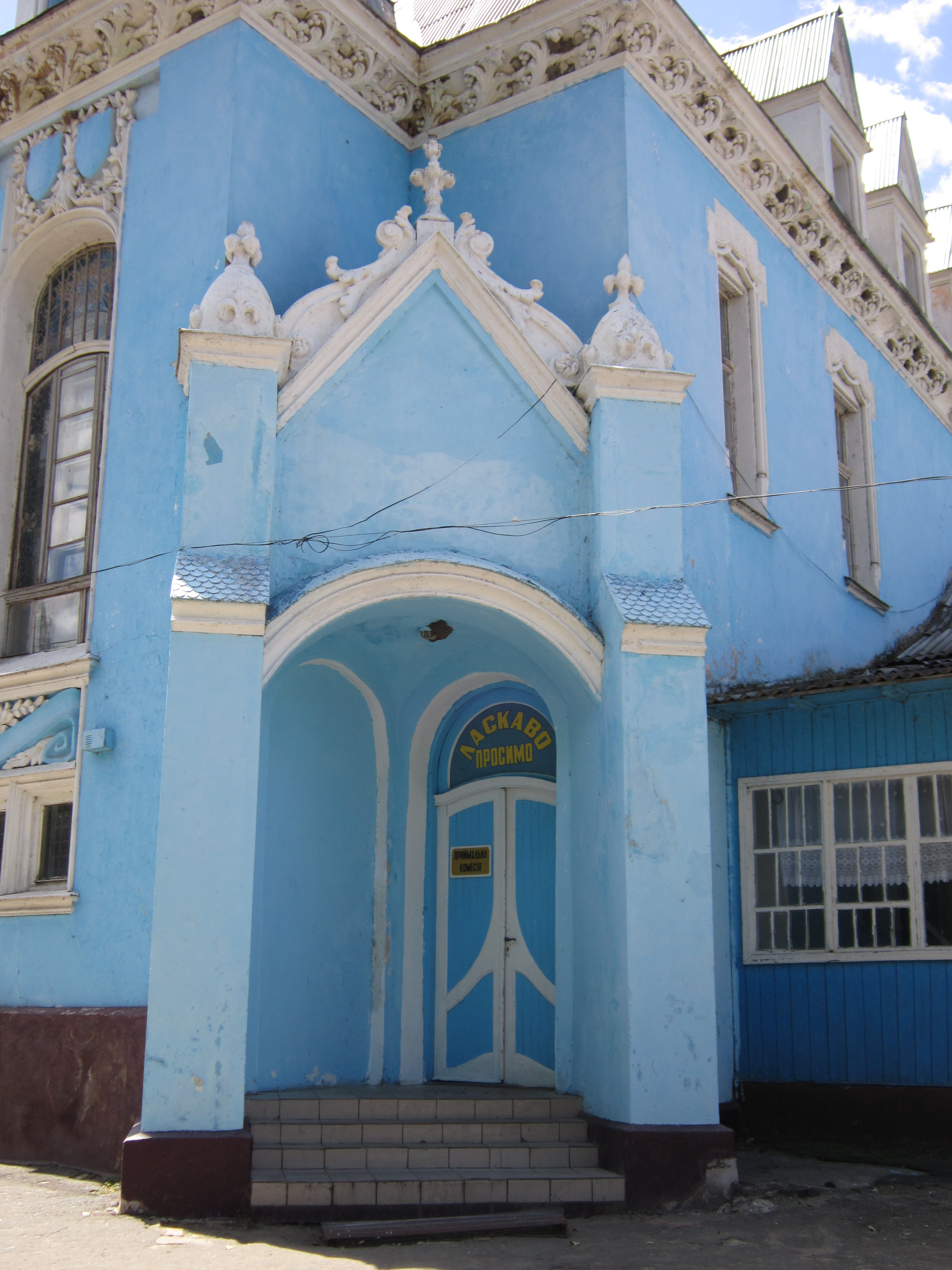
Entrance

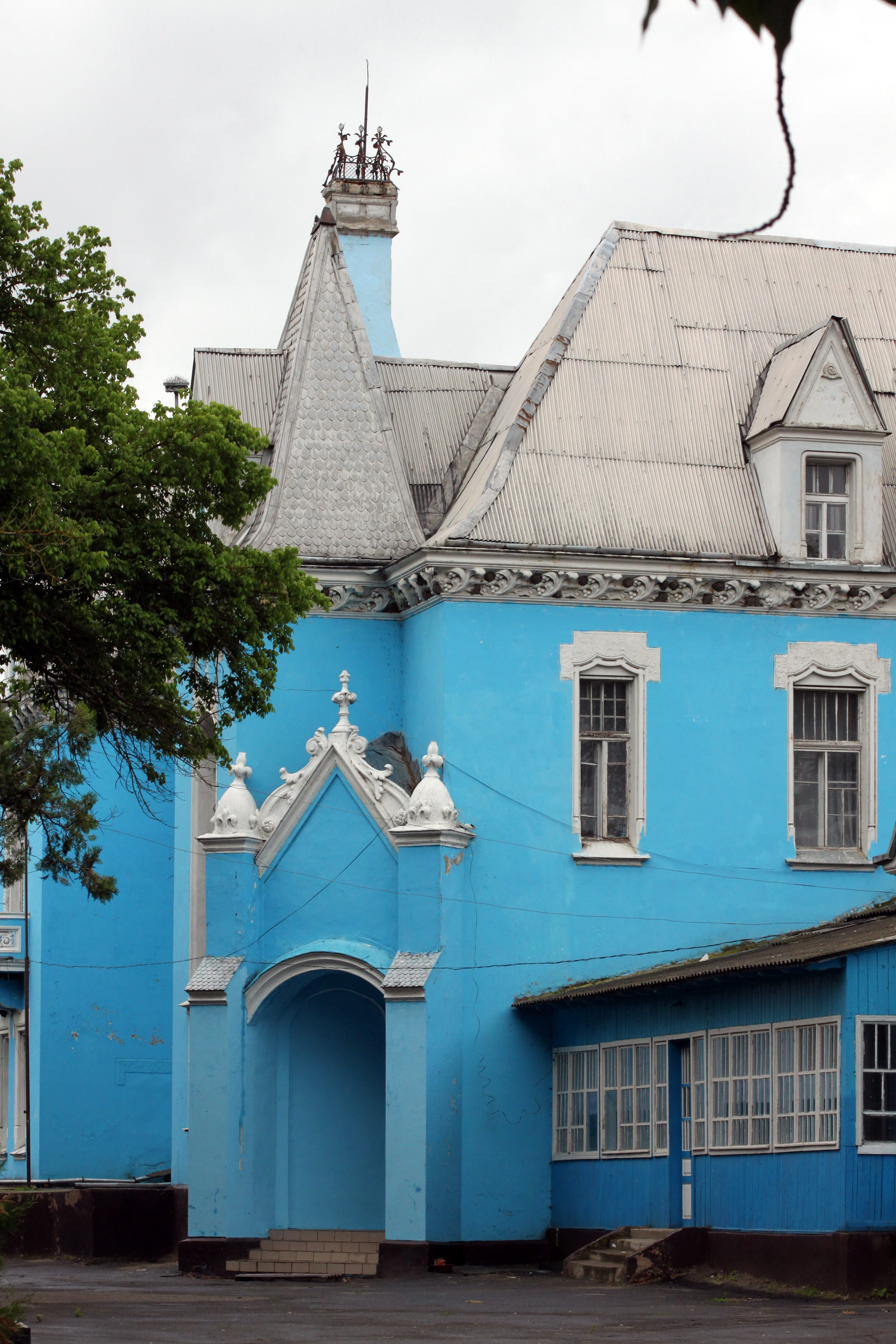
Entrance

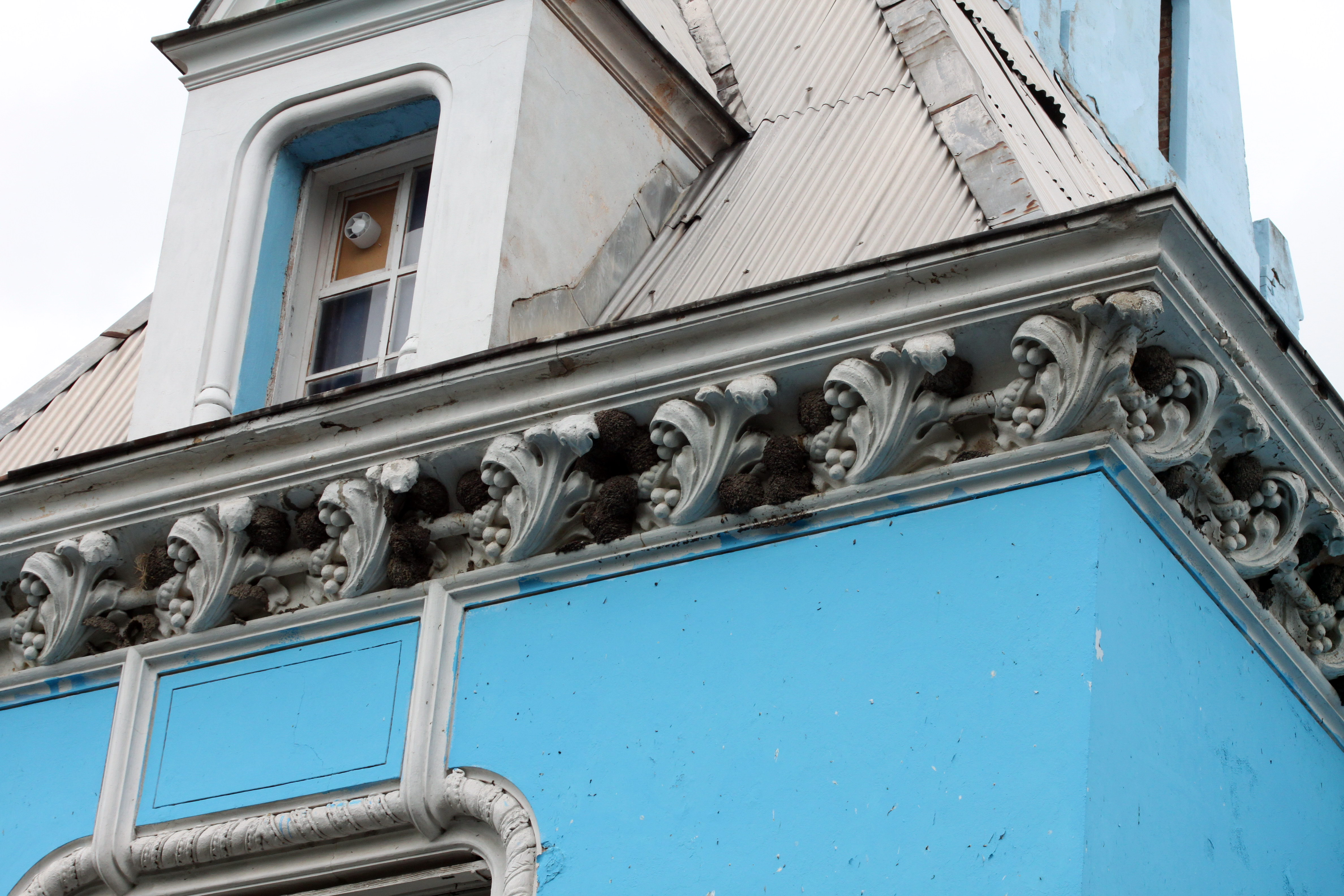
Decorations

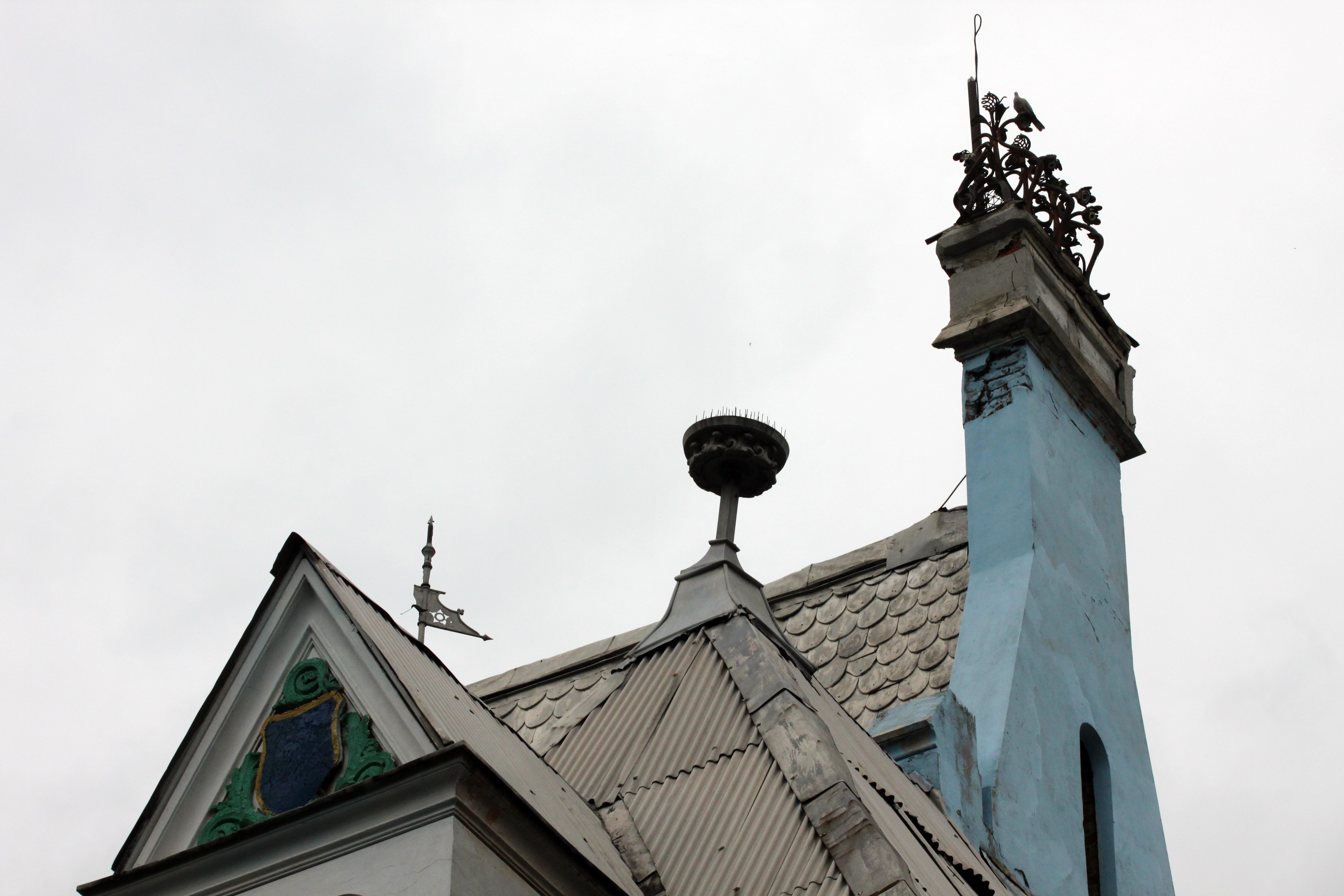
Decorations

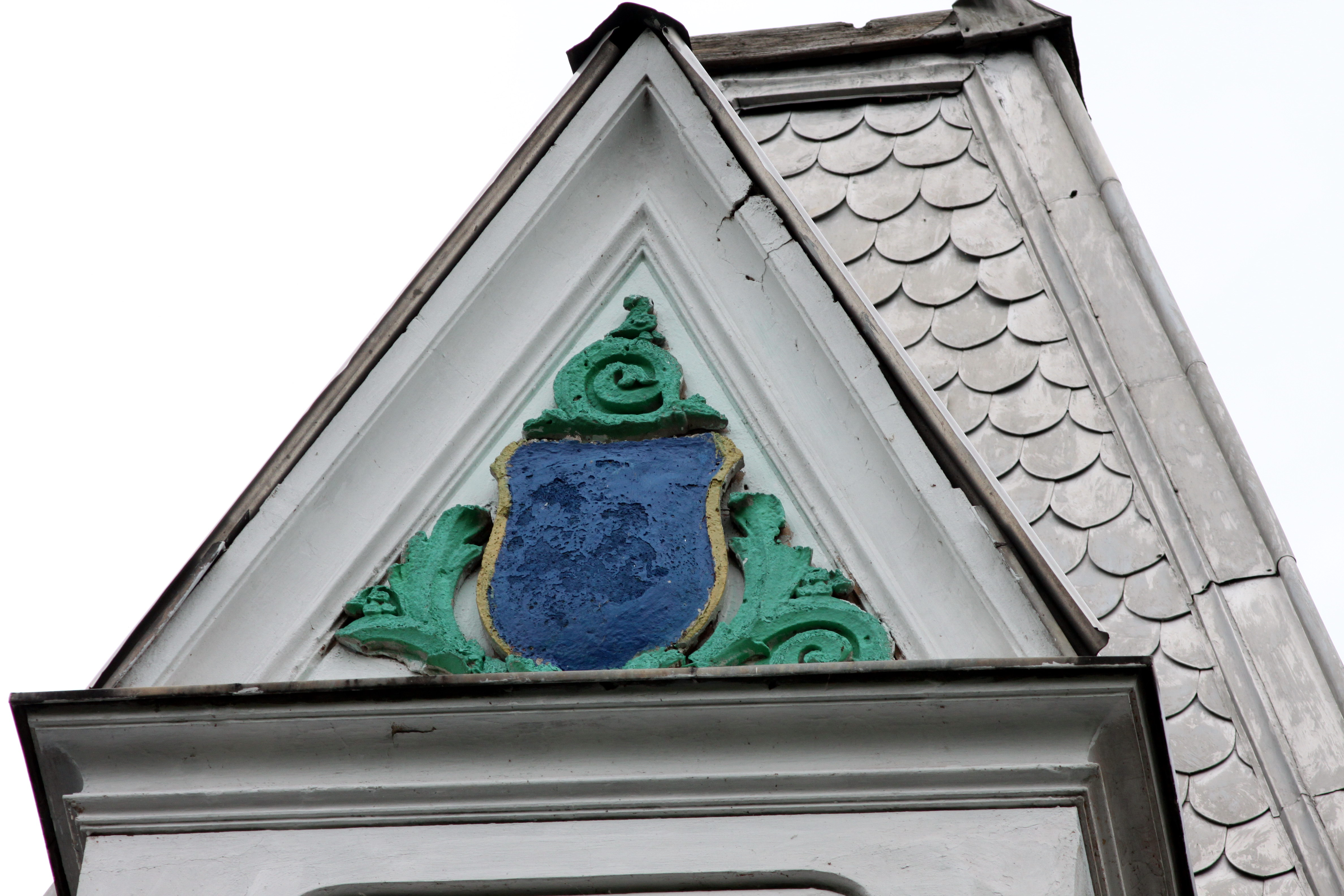
Decorations

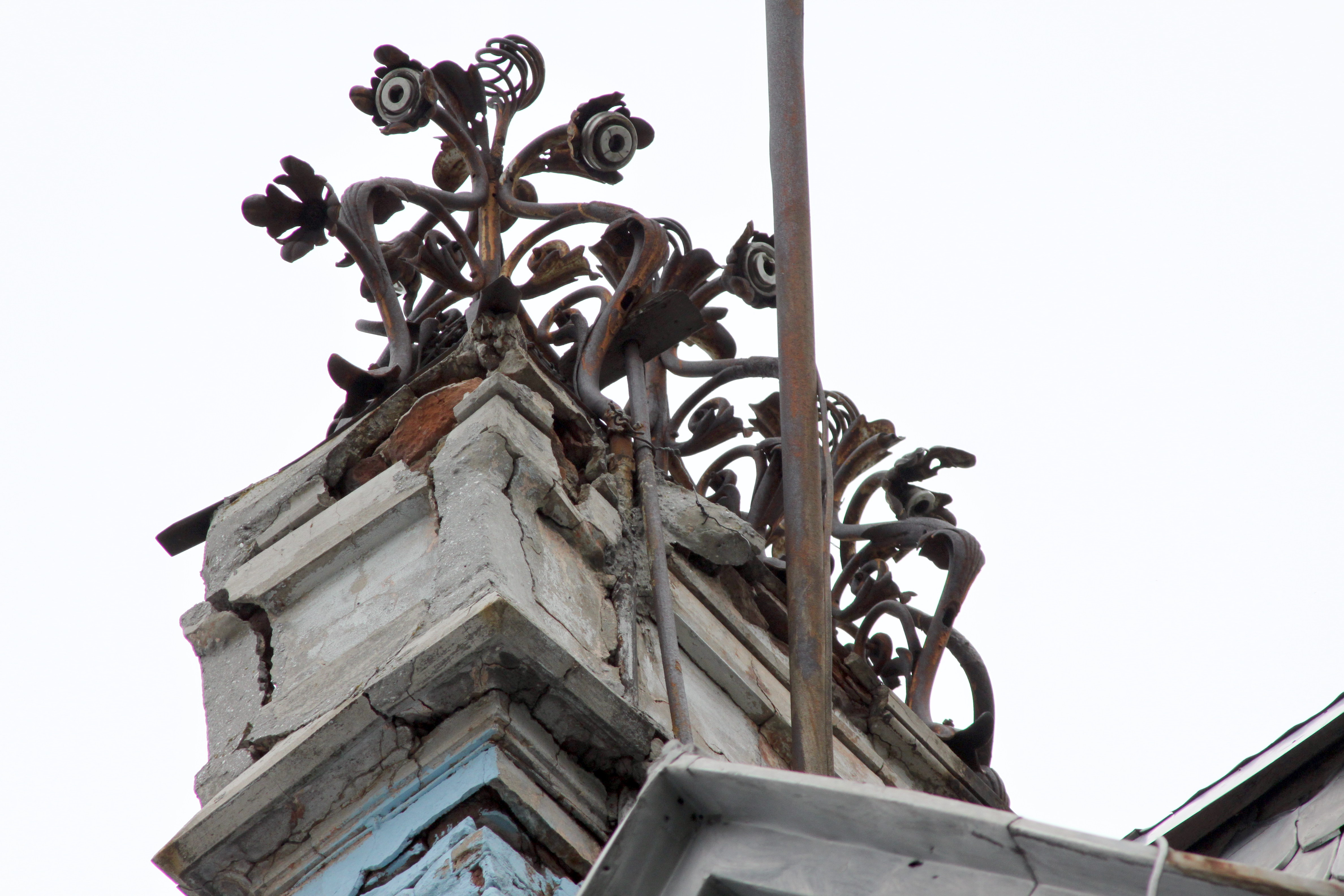
Decorations
