= Isaieve =

Rural locality in Odesa Oblast, Ukraine

Isaieve Ісаєве
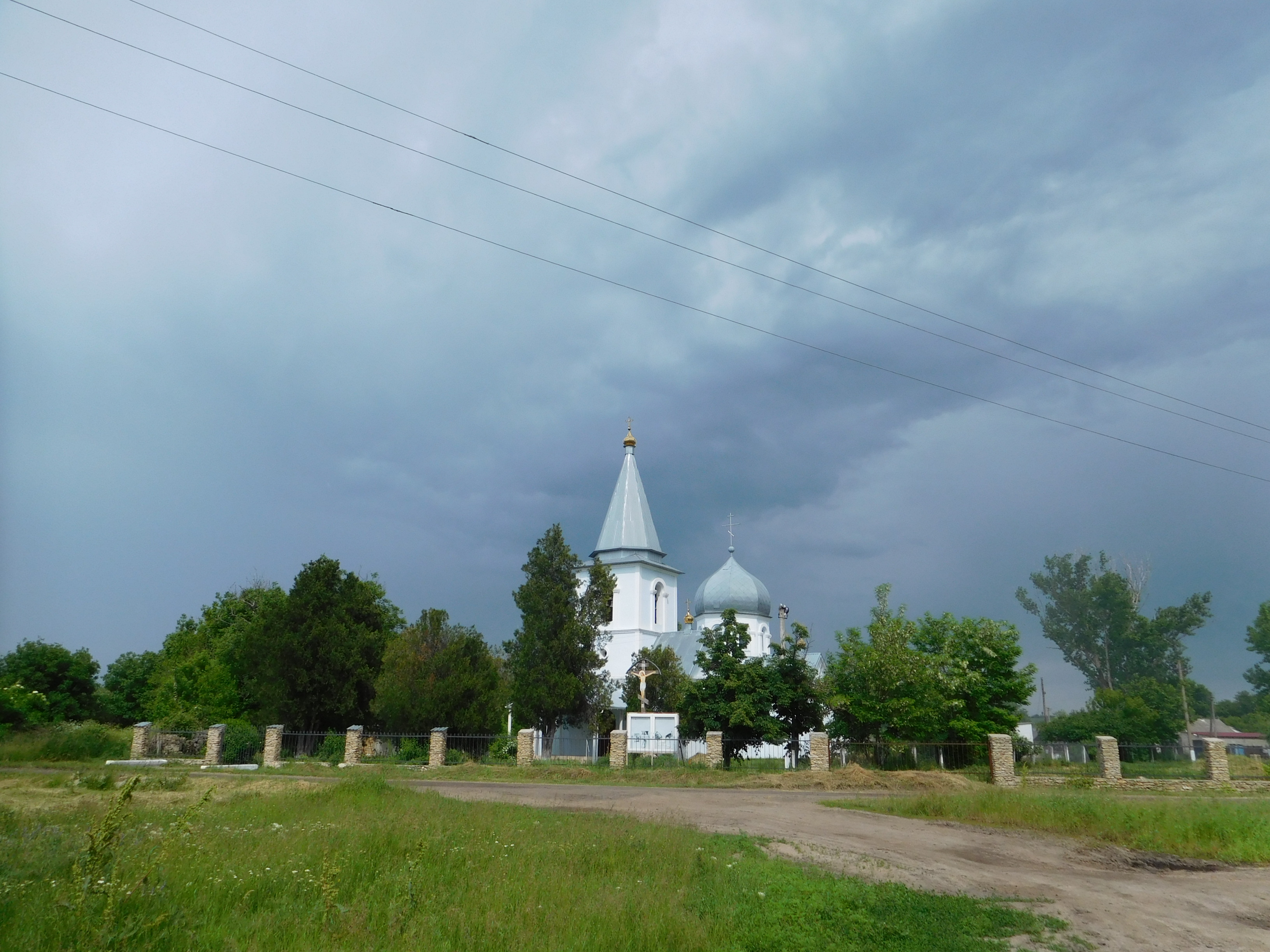
- Our Lady of Kazan church

- Location within Odesa Oblast Location within Ukraine
- Coordinates: 47°28′12″N 30°30′11″E
- Country: Ukraine
- Oblast: Odesa Oblast
- Raion: Berezivka Raion
- Hromada: Andriievo-Ivanivka rural hromada
- Village founded: 1792

Area
  - Total: 0.311 km^{2} (0.120 sq mi)

Population
  - Total: 1,513
- Time zone: UTC+2 (EET (Kyiv))
  - Summer (DST): UTC+3 (EEST)

Isaieve (Ukrainian: Ісаєве) is a village in Berezivka Raion, Odesa Oblast, Ukraine. The village is related to Andriievo-Ivanivka rural hromada, one of the hromadas of Ukraine.

The village was founded by general Ivan Isayev in 1792 uunder the name Isayevka. After 1861 the lands of general Isayev were owned by the Giżycki family.

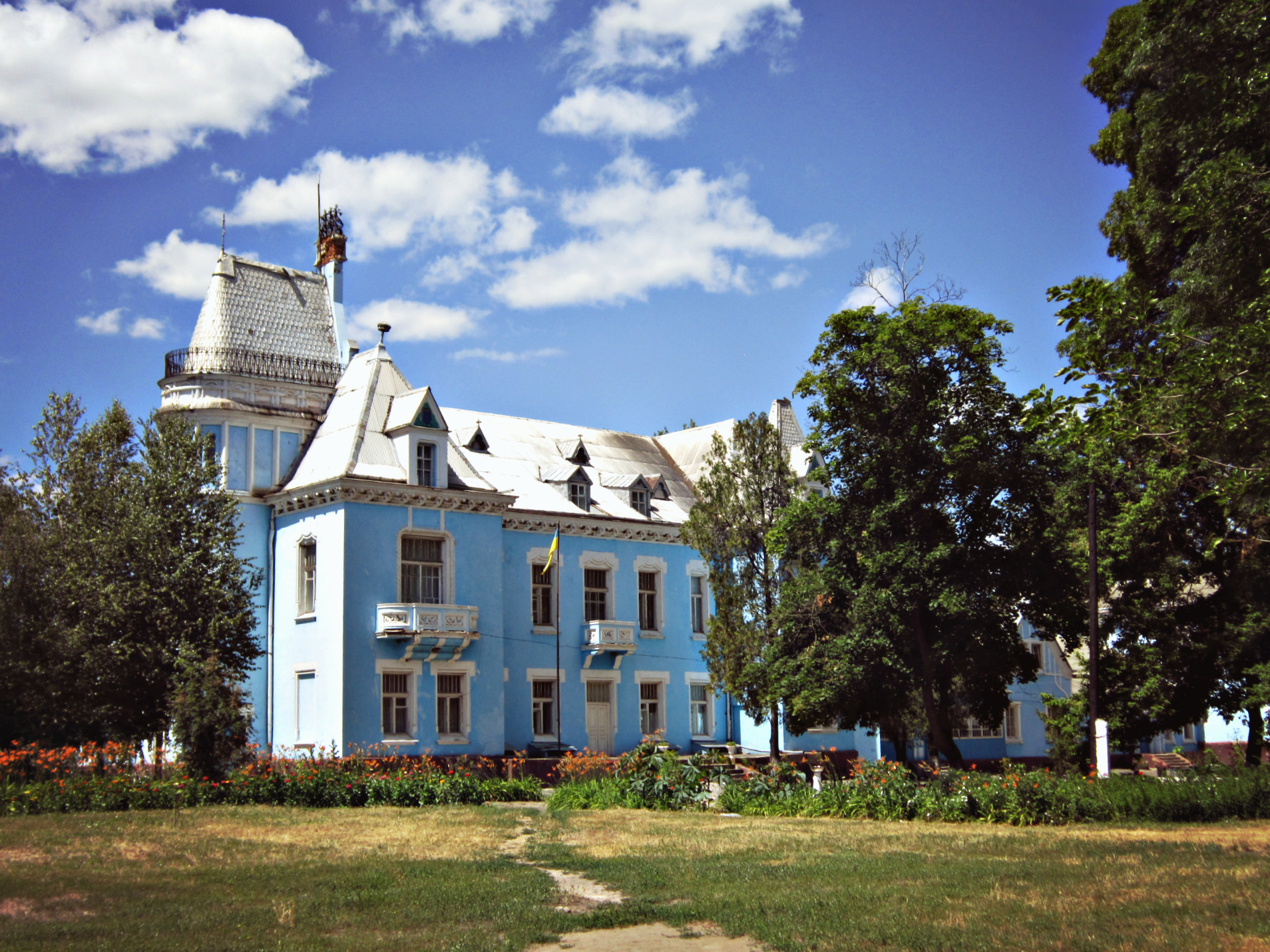
Kuris Palace in Isaieve

A later member of this family, Lyubov Giżycka, married Ivan Kuris. Their son, Oleksandr Kuris, built the Kuris Palace in the village in 1905.

Pyotr Leshchenko, a famous singer in the Russian Empire and later in Romania, was born in the village.
