= Konopliane rural hromada =

Coordinates: 47°03′N 30°28′E

Konopliane rural hromada Коноплянська сільська громада
- Hromada
- Interactive map of Konopliane rural hromada
- Country: Ukraine
- Oblast: Odesa Oblast
- Raion: Berezivka Raion
- Admin. center: Konopliane

Population (2016)
  - Total: 5,514
- CATOTTG code: UA51020110000041005
- Settlements: 20
- Villages: 20
- Website: https://konoplyanska-gromada.gov.ua/

Konopliane rural hromada (Ukrainian: Коноплянська сільська громада) is a hromada in Berezivka Raion of Odesa Oblast in southwestern Ukraine. Population: 5,514 (2016 est.)

The hromada consists of 20 villages:

- Bohunove
- Hanno-Pokrovka
- Hudevycheve
- Dzhuhastarove
- Kalynivka
- Kateryno-Platonivka
- Kozlove
- Konopliane (seat of administration)
- Kryzhanivka
- Liubotaivka
- Markevycheve
- Martsiyanove
- Mykhailopil
- Novakove
- Novoukrainka
- Sylivka
- Sokolove
- Tarasivka
- Vovkove
- Sherove

== Links ==
- Коноплянська сільська ОТГ // Облікова картка на офіційному вебсайті Верховної Ради України.
- https://decentralization.gov.ua/gromada/16#
- http://gromada.info/gromada/konoplyanska/
