= Novokalcheve rural hromada =

Coordinates: 47°11′42″N 31°02′01″E

Novokalcheve rural hromada Новокальчевська сільська громада
- Hromada
- Interactive map of Novokalcheve rural hromada
- Country: Ukraine
- Oblast: Odesa Oblast
- Raion: Berezivka Raion
- Admin. center: Novokalcheve

Area
  - Total: 214.53 km^{2} (82.83 sq mi)

Population (2015)
  - Total: 2,237
  - Density: 10.43/km^{2} (27.01/sq mi)
- CATOTTG code: UA51020170000041393
- Settlements: 12
- Villages: 12
- Website: https://novokalchev.gromada.org.ua

Novokalcheve rural hromada (Ukrainian: Новокальчевська сільська громада) is a hromada in Berezivka Raion of Odesa Oblast in southwestern Ukraine. Population: 2,237 (2015 est.)

The hromada consists of 12 villages:

- Ivanivka
- Novokalcheve (seat of administration)
- Osnova
- Petrivka
- Riasnopil
- Sadove
- Semykhatky
- Sukhine
- Travneve
- Ulianivka
- Vynohradne
- Zelenopillia

== Links ==
- Новокальчевська сільська ОТГ (Червоноармійська) // Облікова картка на офіційному вебсайті Верховної Ради України.
- Одеська обласна рада своїм рішенням створила сім об'єднаних територіальних громад
- gromada.info: Новокальчевська об’єднана територіальна громада
- Децентралізація влади: Новокальчевська сільська громада
- http://atu.minregion.gov.ua/ua/ustriy_page/9346875923570446
