= Mykolaivka, Mykolaivka settlement hromada, Berezivka Raion, Odesa Oblast =

Rural locality in Odesa Oblast, Ukraine

Mykolaivka Миколаївка
- Rural settlement
- Location within Odesa Oblast Location within Ukraine
- Coordinates: 47°32′20″N 30°45′10″E
- Country: Ukraine
- Oblast: Odesa Oblast
- Raion: Berezivka Raion
- Hromada: Mykolaivka settlement hromada

Population (2022)
  - Total: 2,575
- Time zone: UTC+2 (EET)
  - Summer (DST): UTC+3 (EEST)

Mykolaivka or Nikolaevka (Ukrainian: Миколаївка; Russian: Николаевка) is a rural settlement in the west of Odesa Oblast, Ukraine. It hosts the administration of Mykolaivka settlement hromada, one of the hromadas of Ukraine. Population: 2,575 (2022 estimate).

Mykolaivka is located on the banks of the Chychykleia River, a right tributary of the Southern Bug, at the border with Mykolaiv Oblast.

== History ==
Mykolaivka was founded in 1791. The area was settled after 1792, when the lands between the Southern Bug and the Dniester were transferred to Russia according to the Iasi Peace Treaty. Until mid-20th century, it was known as Mykolaivka Druha (Ukrainian: Миколаївка Друга, Russian: Николаевка Вторая).

Until 18 July 2020, Mykolaivka was the administrative center of Mykolaivka Raion. The raion was abolished in July 2020 as part of the administrative reform of Ukraine, which reduced the number of raions of Odesa Oblast to seven. The area of Mykolaivka Raion was merged into Berezivka Raion.

Until 26 January 2024, Mykolaivka was designated urban-type settlement. On this day, a new law entered into force which abolished this status, and Mykolaivka became a rural settlement.

== Economy ==
=== Transportation ===
Mykolaivka has road access to the Highway M05 which connects Kyiv and Odesa.
