= Raukhivka settlement hromada =

Coordinates: 47°10′N 30°49′E

Raukhivka settlement hromada Раухівська селищна громада
- Hromada
- Interactive map of Raukhivka settlement hromada
- Country: Ukraine
- Oblast: Odesa Oblast
- Raion: Berezivka Raion
- Admin. center: Raukhivka

Area
  - Total: 283.6 km^{2} (109.5 sq mi)

Population (2020)
  - Total: 8,867
  - Density: 31.27/km^{2} (80.98/sq mi)
- CATOTTG code: UA51020210000019597
- Settlements: 11
- Rural settlements: 1
- Villages: 10

Raukhivka settlement hromada (Ukrainian: Раухівська селищна громада) is a hromada in Berezivka Raion of Odesa Oblast in southwestern Ukraine. Population: 8,867 (2020 est.)

The hromada consists of a rural settlement of Raukhivka and 10 villages:

- Balaichuk
- Chyhyryn
- Chyzhove
- Marynove
- Novopodilske
- Novoselivka
- Shevchenkove
- Vynohrad
- Zavodivka
- Zbrozhkivka

== Links ==
- Децентралізація: Раухівська територіальна громада
