= Raukhivka =

Urban locality in Odesa Oblast, Ukraine

Raukhivka Раухівка
- Rural settlement
- Location within Odesa Oblast Location within Ukraine
- Coordinates: 47°10′01″N 30°49′01″E
- Country: Ukraine
- Oblast: Odesa Oblast
- Raion: Berezivka Raion
- Hromada: Raukhivka settlement hromada

Population (2022)
  - Total: 2,626
- Time zone: UTC+2 (EET)
  - Summer (DST): UTC+3 (EEST)

Raukhivka (Ukrainian: Раухівка; Russian: Рауховка) is a rural settlement in Berezivka Raion of Odesa Oblast in Ukraine. It is located in the steppe approximately 5 kilometres (3.1 mi) southwest of the city of Berezivka. Raukhivka hosts the administration of Raukhivka settlement hromada, one of the hromadas of Ukraine. Population: 2,626 (2022 estimate)

== History ==
During the Ukrainian War of Independence, from 1917 to 1920, it passed between various factions. Afterwards, it was administratively part of the Odesa Governorate of Ukraine.

Until 26 January 2024, Raukhivka was designated urban-type settlement. On this day, a new law entered into force which abolished this status, and Raukhivka became a rural settlement.

== Economy ==
=== Transportation ===
Raukhivka railway station is on the railway connecting Odesa via Berezivka with Tokarivka and further with Mykolaiv and Kropyvnytskyi. There is some passenger traffic.

The settlement has road access to Odesa and Voznesensk, as well as to Highway M05 connecting Kyiv and Odesa.
