= Chohodarivka rural hromada =

Coordinates: 47°22′N 30°04′E

Chohodarivka rural hromada Чогодарівська сільська громада
- Hromada
- Interactive map of Chohodarivka rural hromada
- Country: Ukraine
- Oblast: Odesa Oblast
- Raion: Berezivka Raion
- Admin. center: Chohodarivka

Area
  - Total: 111.98 km^{2} (43.24 sq mi)

Population (2020)
  - Total: 1,423
  - Density: 12.71/km^{2} (32.91/sq mi)
- CATOTTG code: UA51020290000017926
- Settlements: 9
- Villages: 9

Chohodarivka rural hromada (Ukrainian: Чогодарівська сільська громада) is a hromada in Berezivka Raion of Odesa Oblast in southwestern Ukraine. Population: 1,423 (2020 est.)

The hromada consists of 9 villages:

- Brankovanove
- Chohodarivka (seat of administration)
- Kachulove
- Kopiikove
- Malihonove
- Mashenka (unpopulated since 2009–2011)
- Samiilivka
- Valentynivka
- Volodymyrivka

== Links ==
- Чогодарівська сільська територіальна громада
- https://decentralization.gov.ua/gromada/1686/composition
- https://dair.odessa.gov.ua/info/novini1/v-odeskj-oblast-triva-proces-utvorennya-otg/
