= Kurisove rural hromada =

Coordinates: 46°58′N 30°57′E

Kurisove rural hromada Курісовська сільська громада
- Hromada
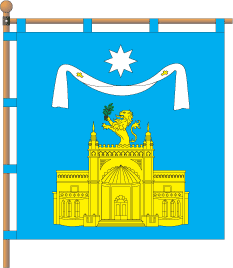
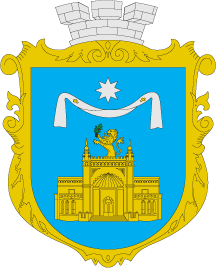
- Flag Coat of arms
- Interactive map of Kurisove rural hromada
- Country: Ukraine
- Oblast: Odesa Oblast
- Raion: Berezivka Raion
- Admin. center: Kurisove

Area
  - Total: 258.2 km^{2} (99.7 sq mi)

Population (2020)
  - Total: 7,702
  - Density: 29.83/km^{2} (77.26/sq mi)
- CATOTTG code: UA51020130000060117
- Settlements: 8
- Villages: 8

Kurisove rural hromada (Ukrainian: Курісовська сільська громада) is a hromada in Berezivka Raion of Odesa Oblast in southwestern Ukraine. Population: 7,702 (2020 est.)

The hromada consists of 8 villages:

- Vyshneve
- Kairy
- Kapitanivka
- Kurisove (seat of administration)
- Nove Selyshche
- Novomykolaivka
- Oleksandrivka
- Serbka

== Links ==
- Децентралізація: Курісовська сільська громада
- https://kurisovska.gr.org.ua/ogoloshennya-pro-provedennya-konkursu-na-zamishhennya-vakantnyh-posad-kurisovskoyi-silskoyi-rady/
