= Konopliane =

Rural locality in Odesa Oblast, Ukraine

Konopliane Конопляне
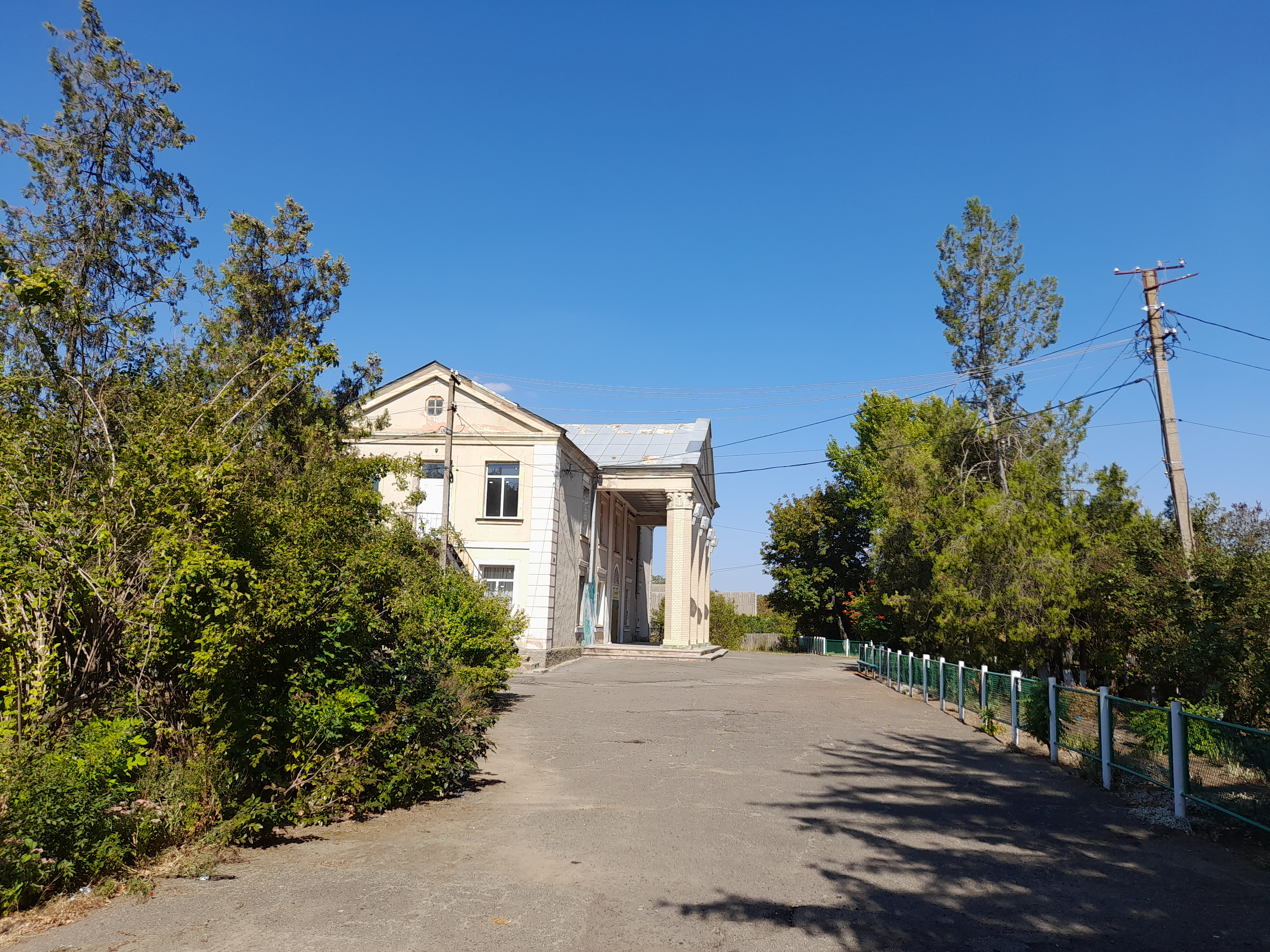
- House of culture

- Location within Odesa Oblast Location within Ukraine
- Country: Ukraine
- Oblast: Odesa Oblast
- Raion: Berezivka Raion
- Hromada: Konopliane rural hromada
- Village founded: 1842
- Time zone: UTC+2 (EET (Kyiv))
  - Summer (DST): UTC+3 (EEST)

Konopliane (Ukrainian: Конопляне) is a village in Berezivka Raion, Odesa Oblast, Ukraine. It hosts the administration of Konopliane rural hromada, one of the hromadas of Ukraine.

Konopliane was founded as Yevheniivka (Євгеніївка) in 1842.

== Demographics ==
Native language as of the Ukrainian Census of 2001:

- Ukrainian 90.86%
- Russian 5.8%
- Gagauz 1.05%
- Armenian 0.88%
- Romanian 0.76%
- Bulgarian 0.64%

== Gallery ==
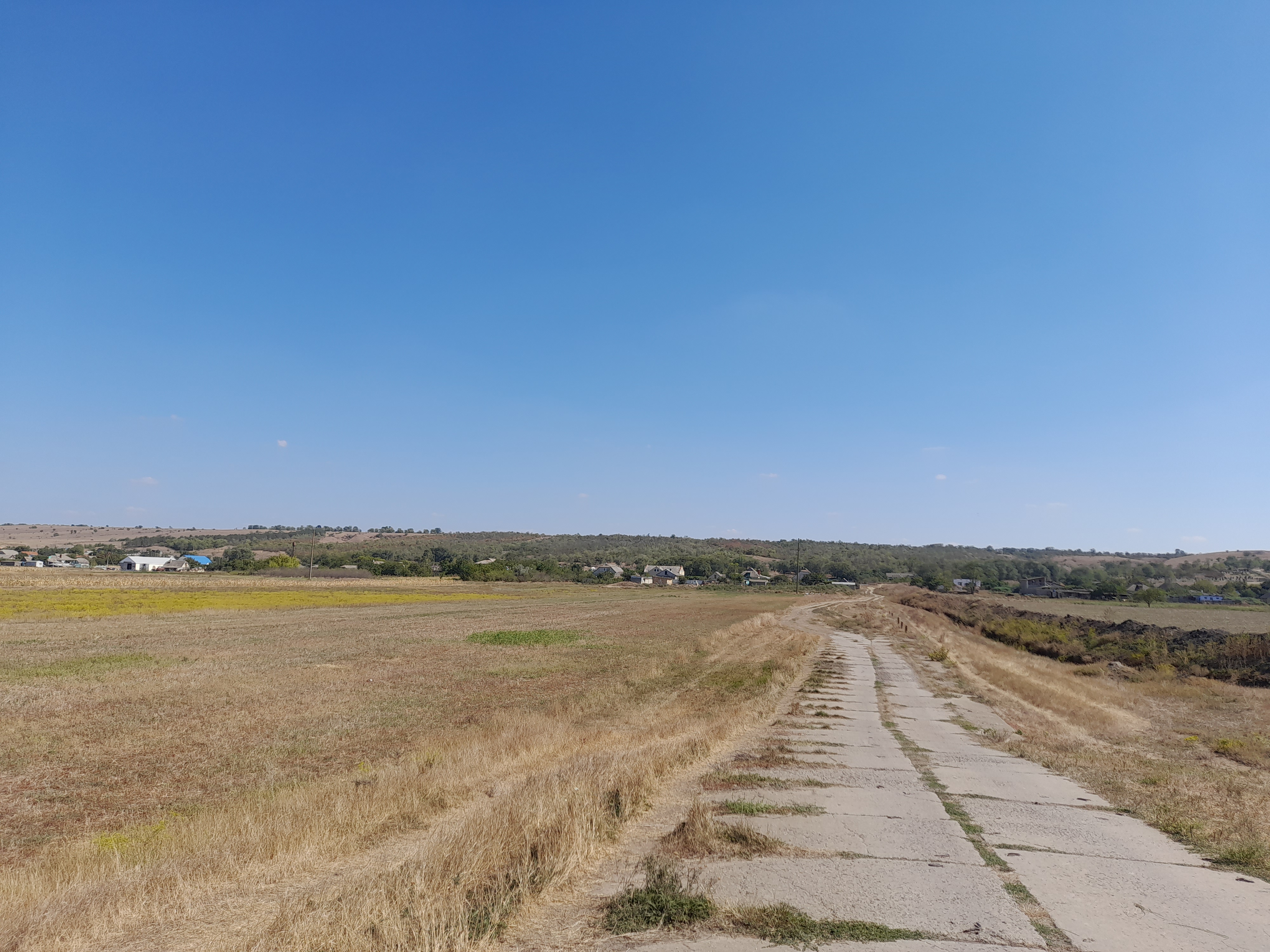
Landscape view on the village

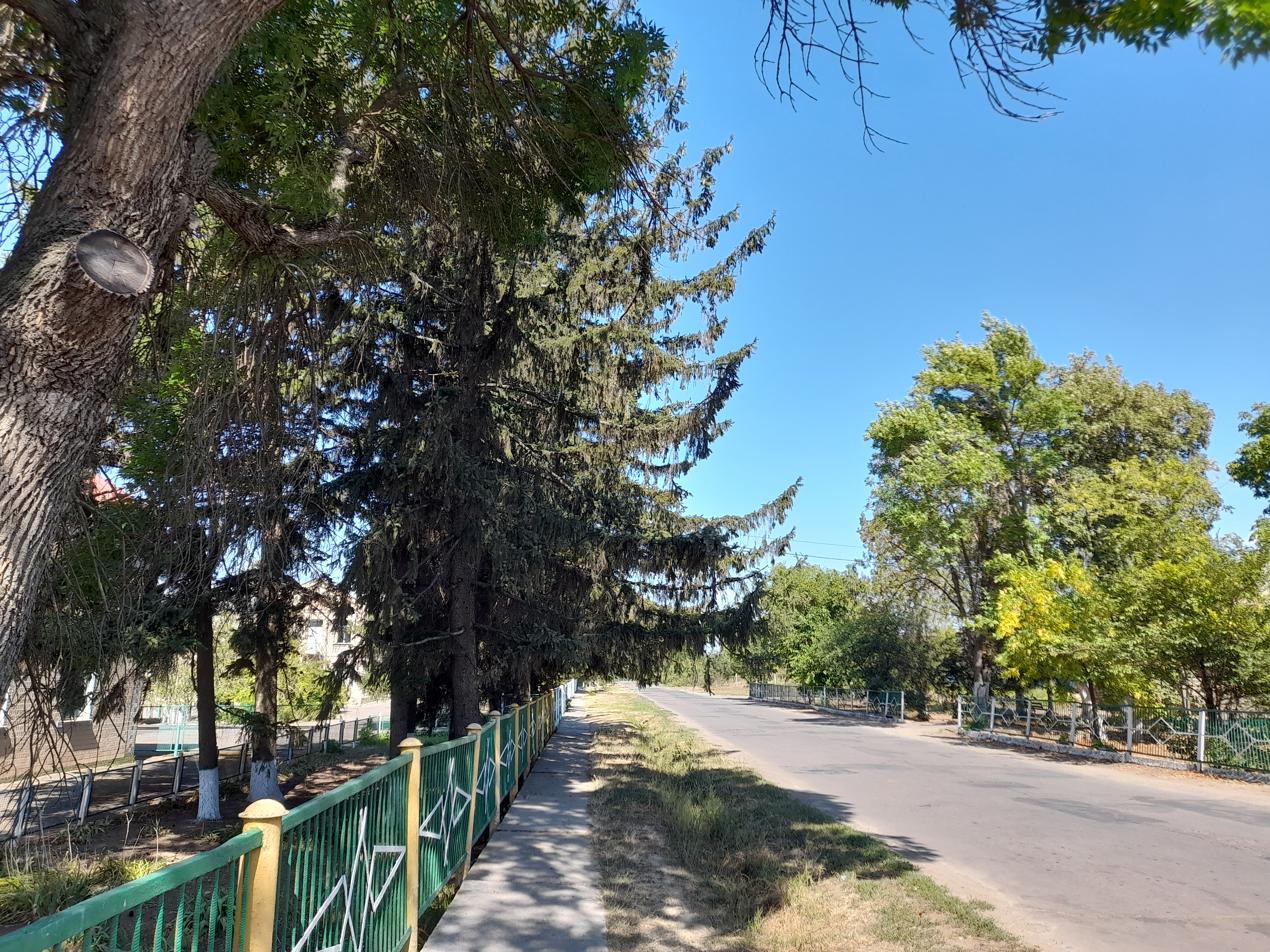
A village street

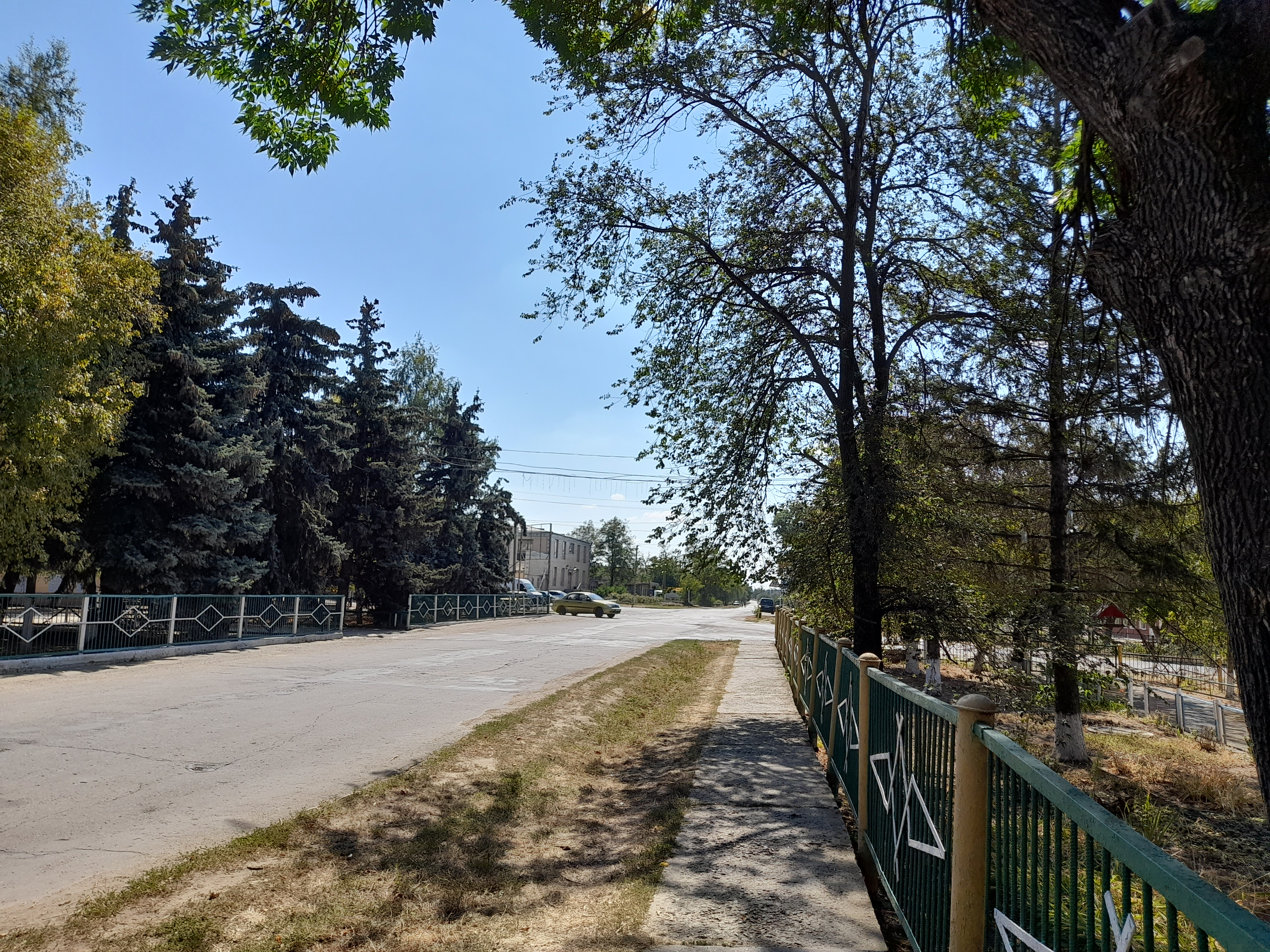
A village street

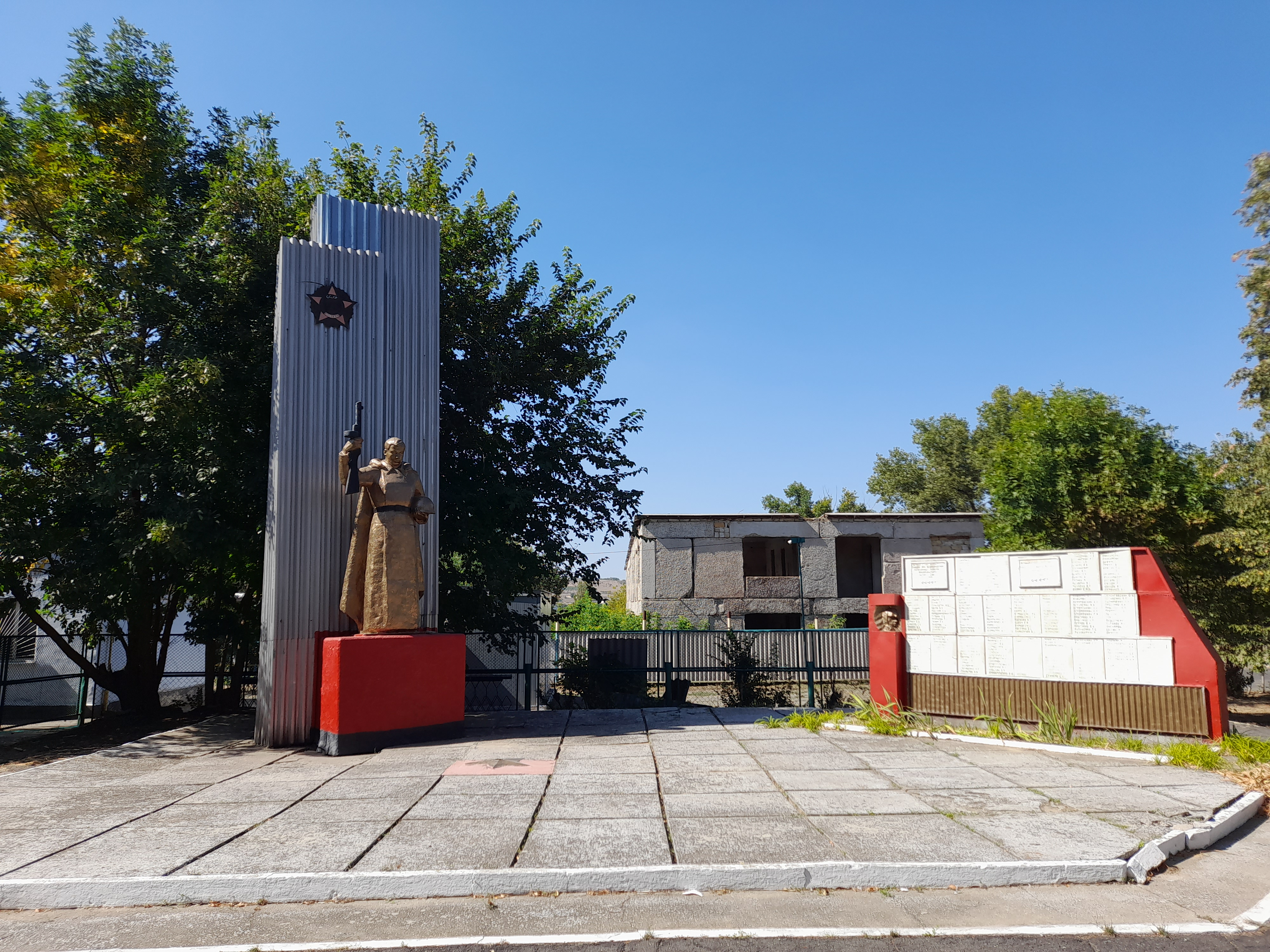
WWII memorial
