= Mykolaivka settlement hromada, Odesa Oblast =

Coordinates: 47°30′N 30°43′E

Mykolaivka settlement hromada Миколаївська селищна громада
- Hromada
- Interactive map of Mykolaivka settlement hromada
- Country: Ukraine
- Oblast: Odesa Oblast
- Raion: Berezivka Raion
- Admin. center: Mykolaivka

Area
  - Total: 537.0 km^{2} (207.3 sq mi)

Population (2020)
  - Total: 7,172
  - Density: 13.36/km^{2} (34.59/sq mi)
- CATOTTG code: UA51020150000090298
- Settlements: 23
- Rural settlements: 1
- Villages: 22

Mykolaivka settlement hromada (Ukrainian: Миколаївська селищна громада) is a hromada of Ukraine, located in Berezivka Raion, Odesa Oblast. Its administrative center is the town of Mykolaivka.

It has an area of 537.0 square kilometres (207.3 mi^{2}) and a population of 7,172, as of 2020.

The hromada includes 23 settlements: 1 rural settlement (Mykolaivka) and 22 villages:

- Ambariv
- Antonyuki
- Vasylivka
- Gvozdivka
- Druzhelyubivka
- Kare
- Komarasheve
- Mala Dvoryanka
- Maryanivka
- Morozova
- Novopetrivka
- Novopokrovka
- Oleksiivka
- Peremoha
- Pereselentsi
- Romanivka
- Sofiivka
- Stavkove
- Sukhy Ovrag
- Ulyanovka
- Charivne
- Shiroke
