= Berezivka Raion =

Subdivision of Odesa Oblast, Ukraine

Berezivka Raion Березівський район
- Raion
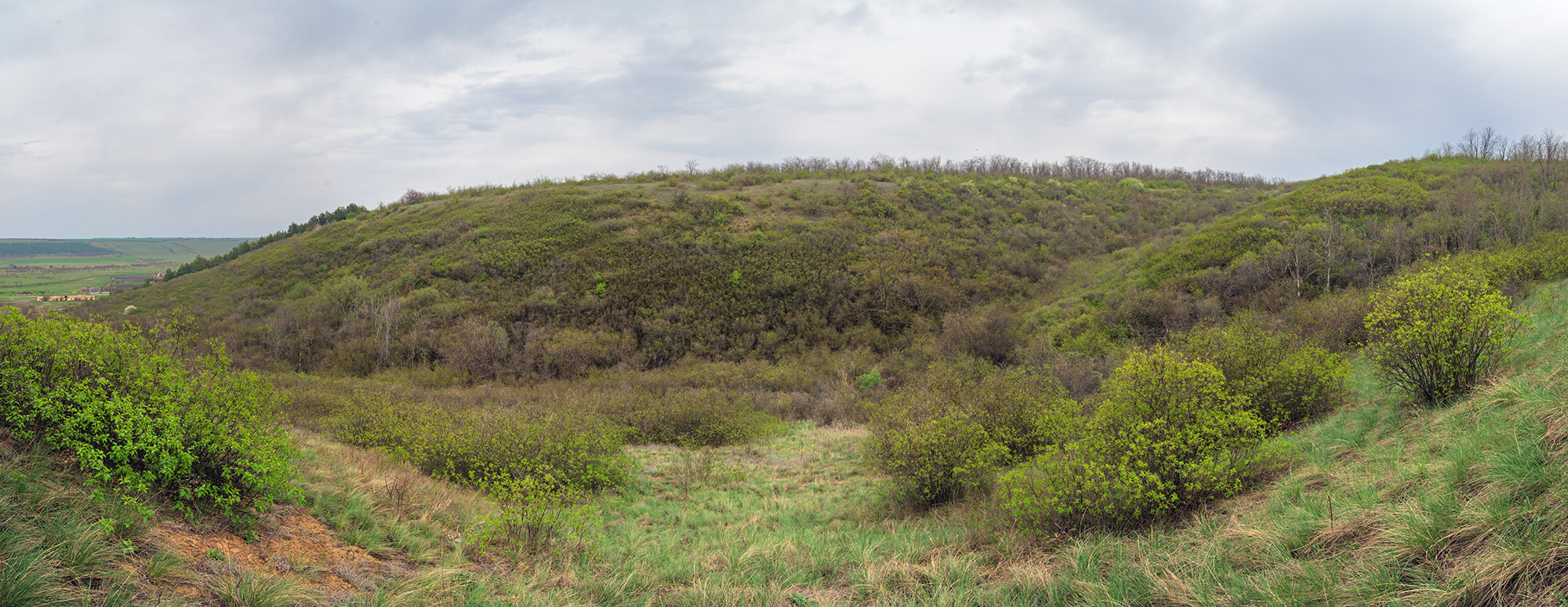

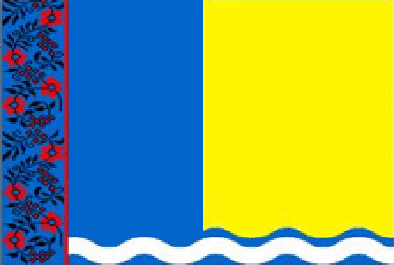
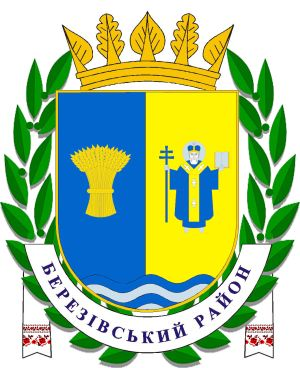
- Flag Coat of arms
- Interactive map of Berezivka Raion
- Coordinates: 47°11′N 30°55′E
- Country: Ukraine
- Oblast: Odesa Oblast
- Established: 1923
- Admin. center: Berezivka
- Hromadas: 16 hromadas

Government
  - Governor: Ivan Rudenko

Area: since July 2020
  - Total: 5,798.3 km^{2} (2,238.7 sq mi)

Population (2022)
  - Total: 104,969
  - Density: 18.103/km^{2} (46.888/sq mi)
- Time zone: UTC+2 (EET)
  - Summer (DST): UTC+3 (EEST)
- Postal index: 67300—67362
- Area code: +380 4856
- Website: https://berezivka-rda.od.gov.ua

Berezivka Raion (Ukrainian: Березівський район) is a raion (district) in Odesa Oblast of Ukraine. Its administrative center is the city of Berezivka. Population: 104,969 (2022 estimate).

On 18 July 2020, as part of the administrative reform of Ukraine, the number of raions of Odesa Oblast was reduced to seven, and the area of Berezivka Raion was significantly expanded. Three abolished raions, Ivanivka, Mykolaivka, and Shyriaieve Raions, as well as part of Lyman Raion, were merged into Berezivka Raion. The January 2020 estimate of the raion population was 32,760 (2020 est.).

== Administrative division ==
=== Current ===
After the reform in July 2020, the raion consisted of 16 hromadas:

- Andriivo-Ivanivka rural hromada with the administration in the village of Andriivo-Ivanivka, merged from Mykolaivka Raion:
- Berezivka urban hromada with the administration in the city of Berezivka, retained from Berezivka Raion;
- Chohodarivka rural hromada with the administration in the village of Chohodarivka, transferred from Shyriaieve Raion;
- Ivanivka settlement hromada with the administration in the rural settlement of Ivanivka, transferred from Ivanivka Raion;
- Konopliane rural hromada with the administration in the village of Konopliane, transferred from Ivanivka Raion;
- Kurisove rural hromada with the administration in the village of Kurisowe, transferred from Lyman Raion;
- Mykolaivka settlement hromada with the administration in the rural settlement of Mykolaivka, merged from Mykolaivka Raion:
- Novokalcheve rural hromada with the administration in the village of Novokalcheve, retained from Berezivka Raion;
- Petrovirivka rural hromada with the administration in the village of Petrovirivka, transferred from Shyriaieve Raion;
- Raukhivka settlement hromada with the administration in the rural settlement of Raukhivka, retained from Berezivka Raion;
- Rozkvit rural hromada with the administration in the village of Rozkvit, retained from Berezivka Raion;
- Stari Maiaky rural hromada with the administration in the village of Stari Maiaky, transferred from Shyriaieve Raion;
- Shyriaieve settlement hromada with the administration in the rural settlement of Shyriaieve, transferred from Shyriaieve Raion;
- Striukove rural hromada with the administration in the village of Striukove, merged from Mykolaivka Raion:
- Velykyi Buialyk rural hromada with the administration in the village of Velykyi Buialyk, transferred from Ivanivka Raion;
- Znamianka rural hromada with the administration in the village of Znamianka, transferred from Ivanivka Raion;

=== Before 2020 ===
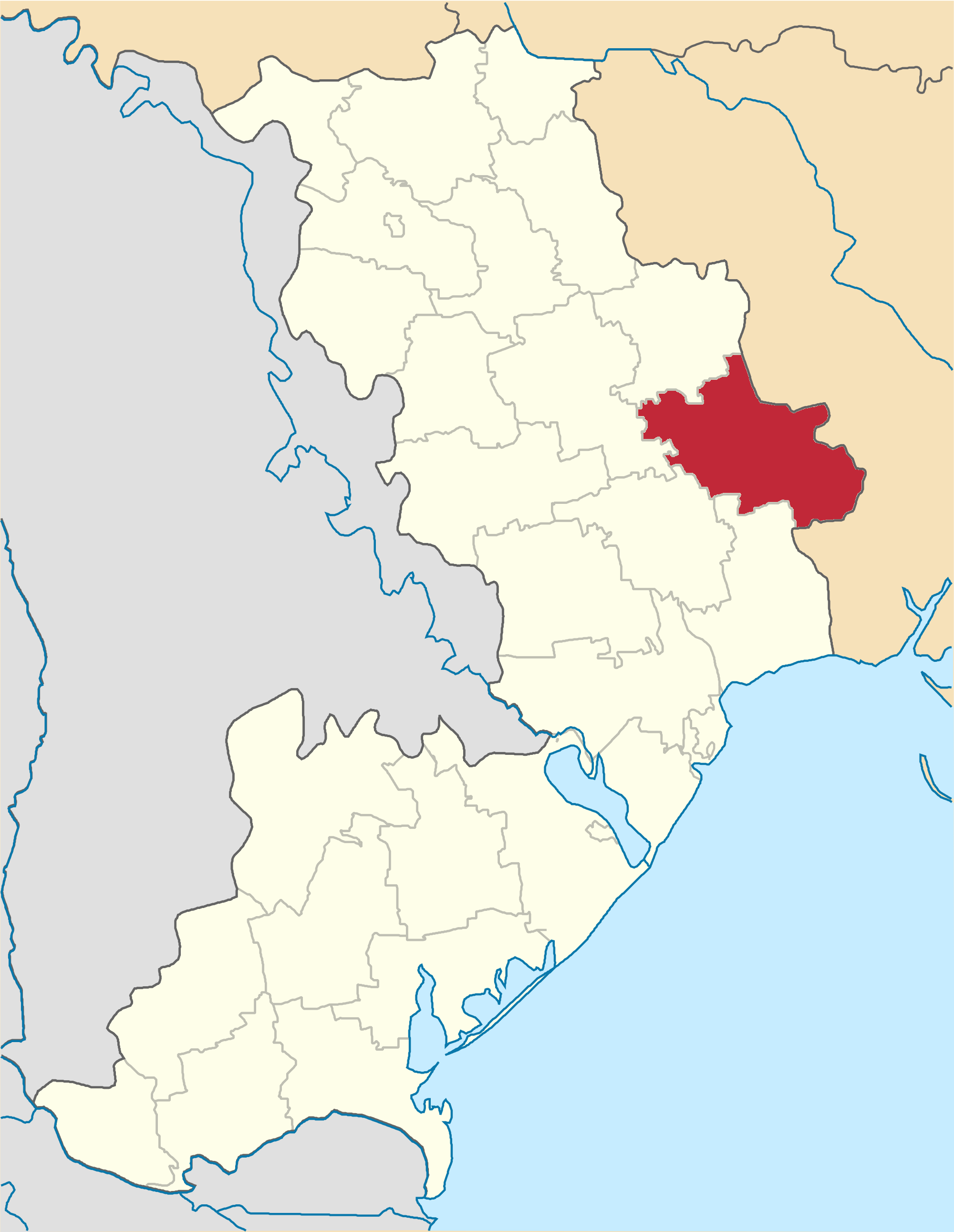
Berezivka Raion in Odesa Oblast (1966-2020)

Before the 2020 reform, the raion consisted of four hromadas,

- Berezivka urban hromada, with the administration in Berezivka;
- Novokalcheve rural hromada with the administration in Novokalcheve;
- Raukhivka settlement hromada with the administration in Raukhivka;
- Rozkvit rural hromada with the administration in Rozkvit.

== Tourist attractions ==
Castles and palaces of Berezivka Raion
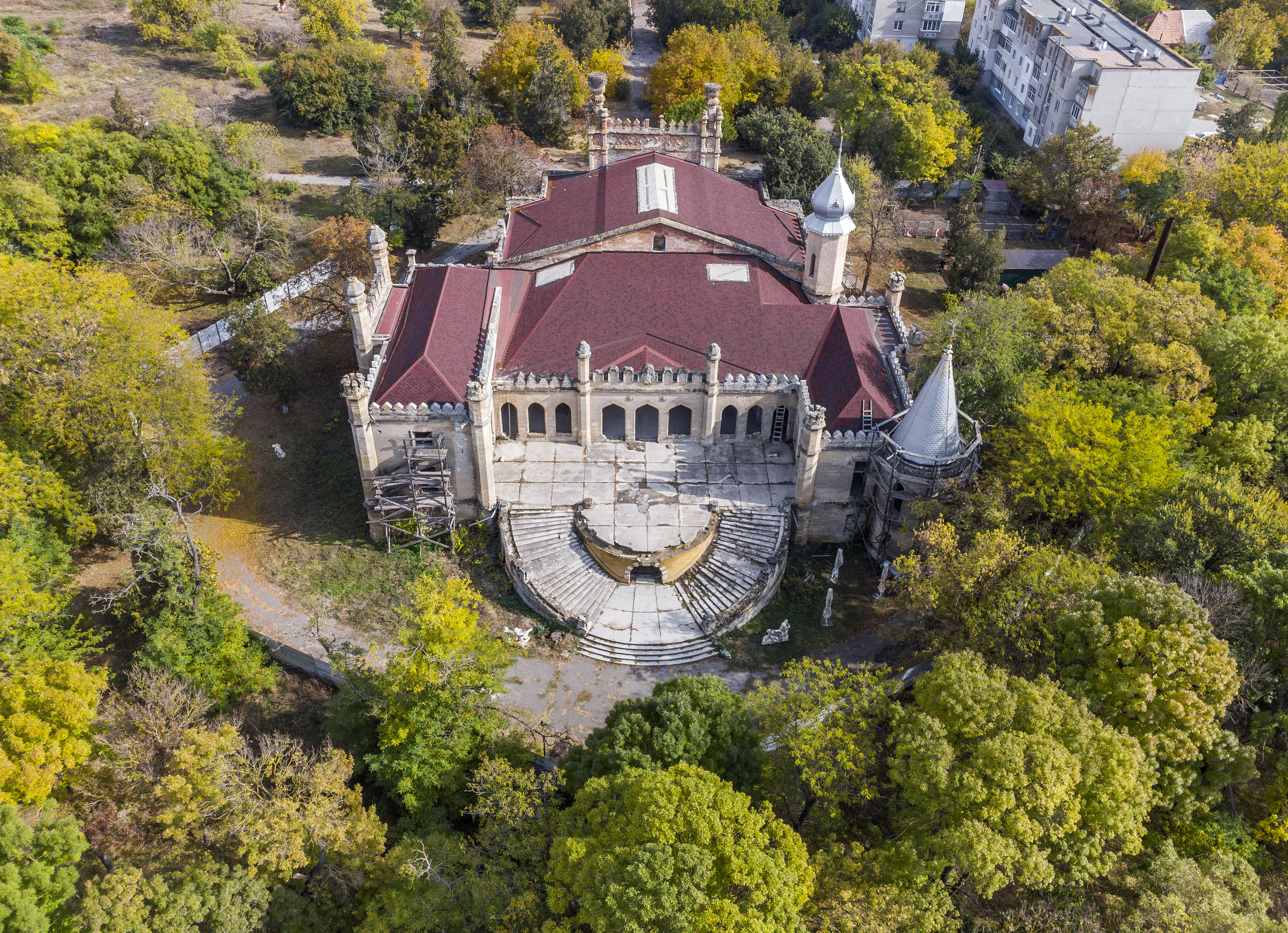
Kuris Palace in Kurisowe

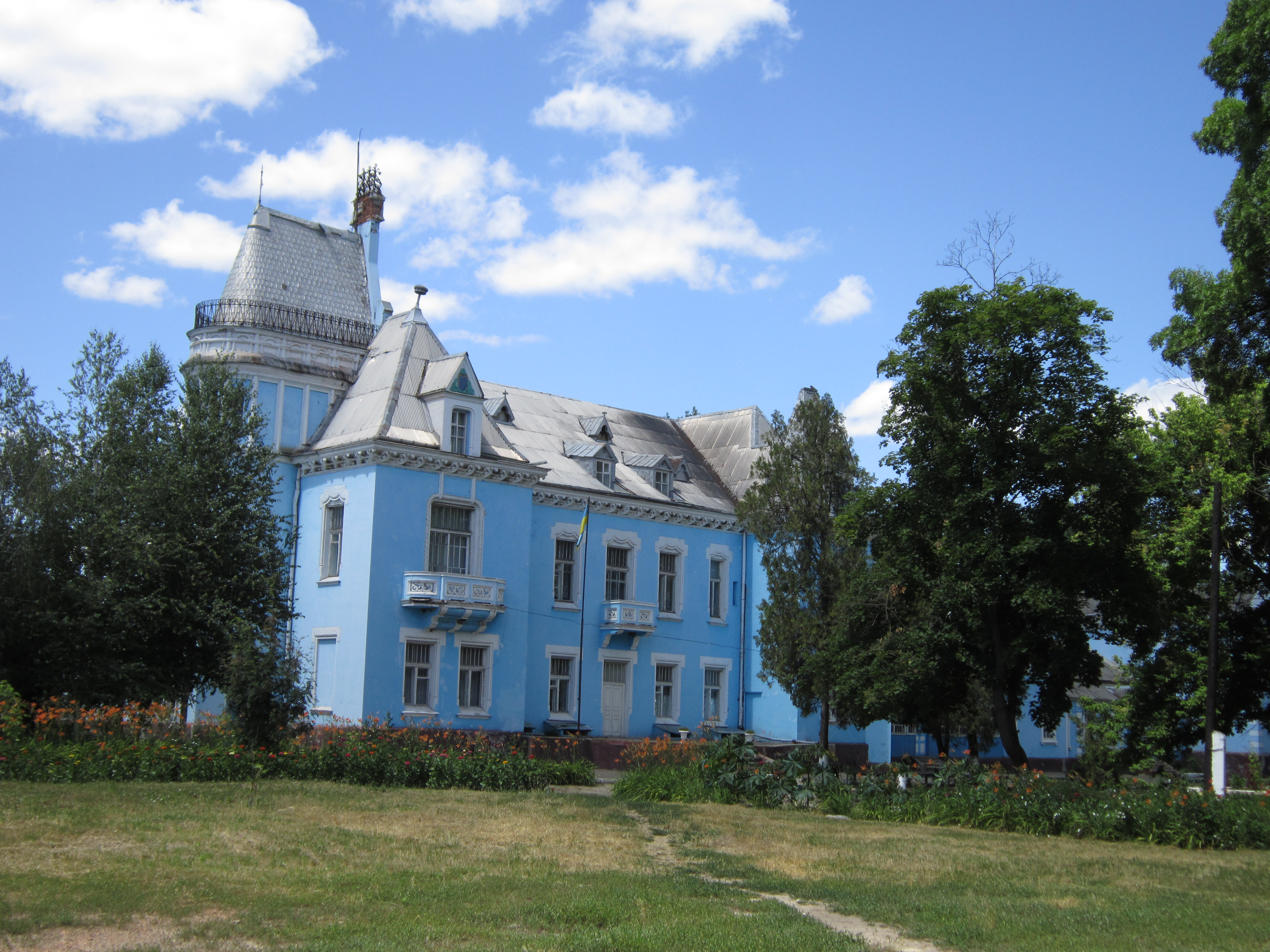
Kuris Palace in Isaieve

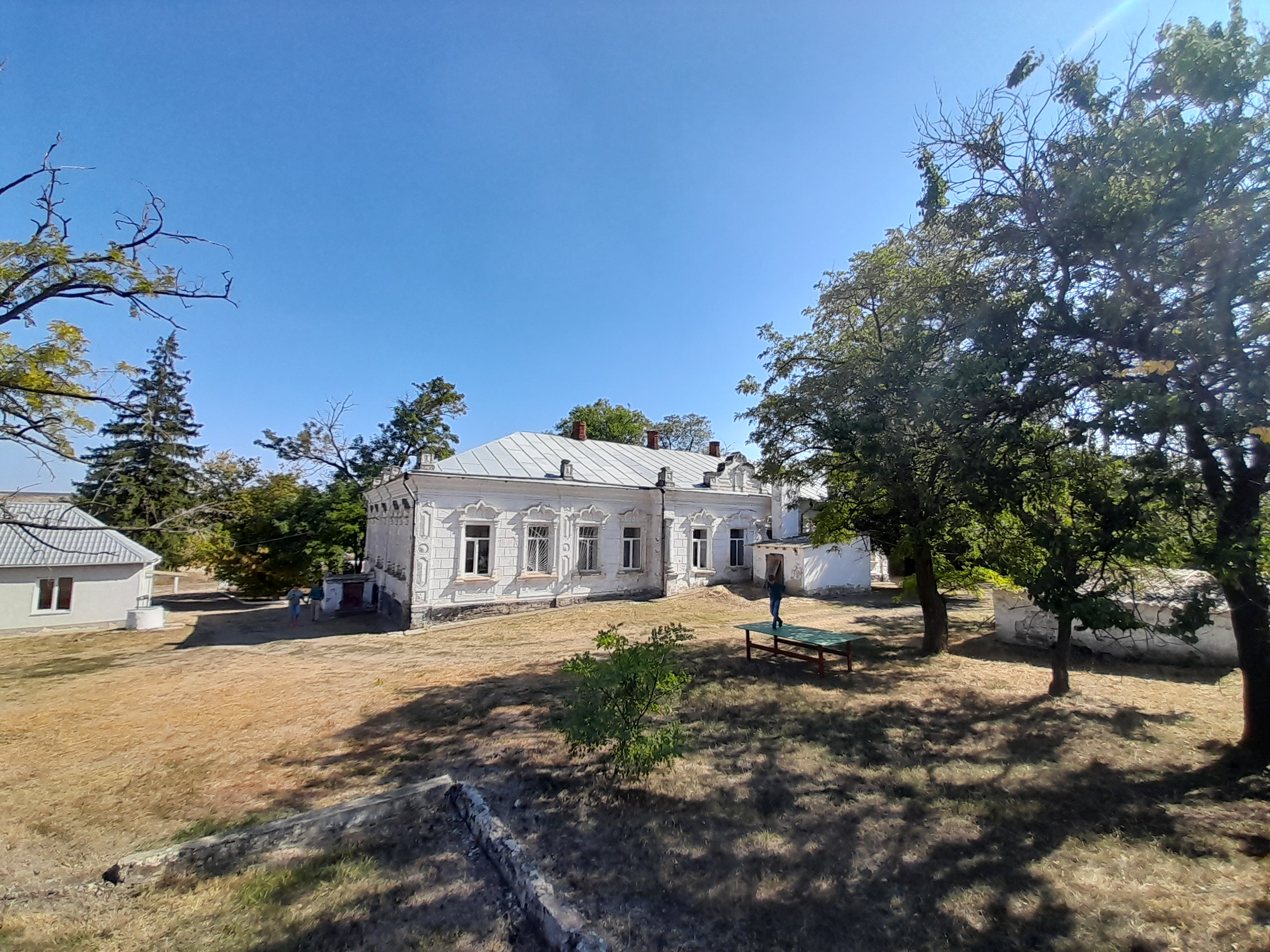
Jukowski Manor in Mykhailopil

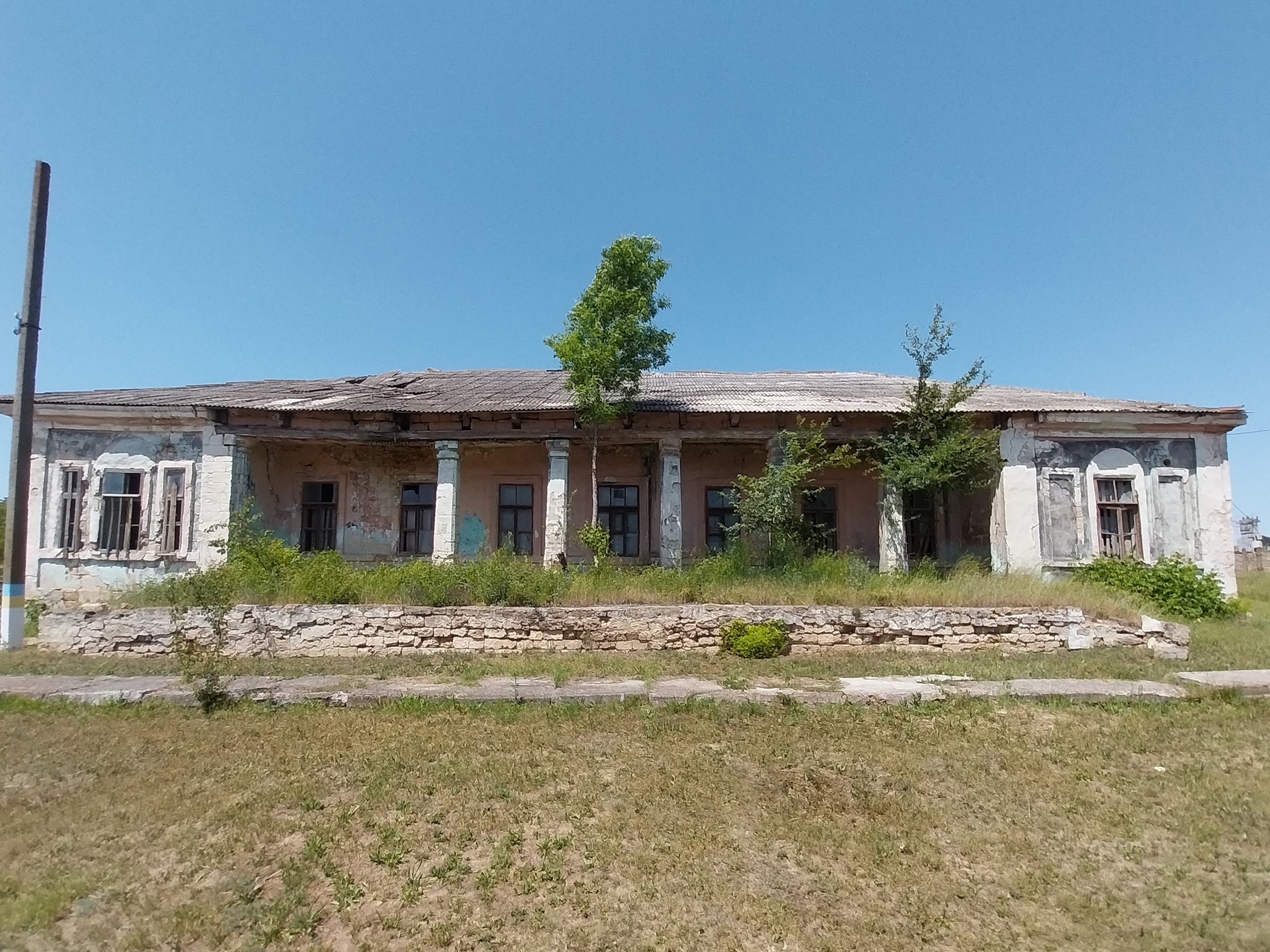
Giżycki Manor in Riasnopil

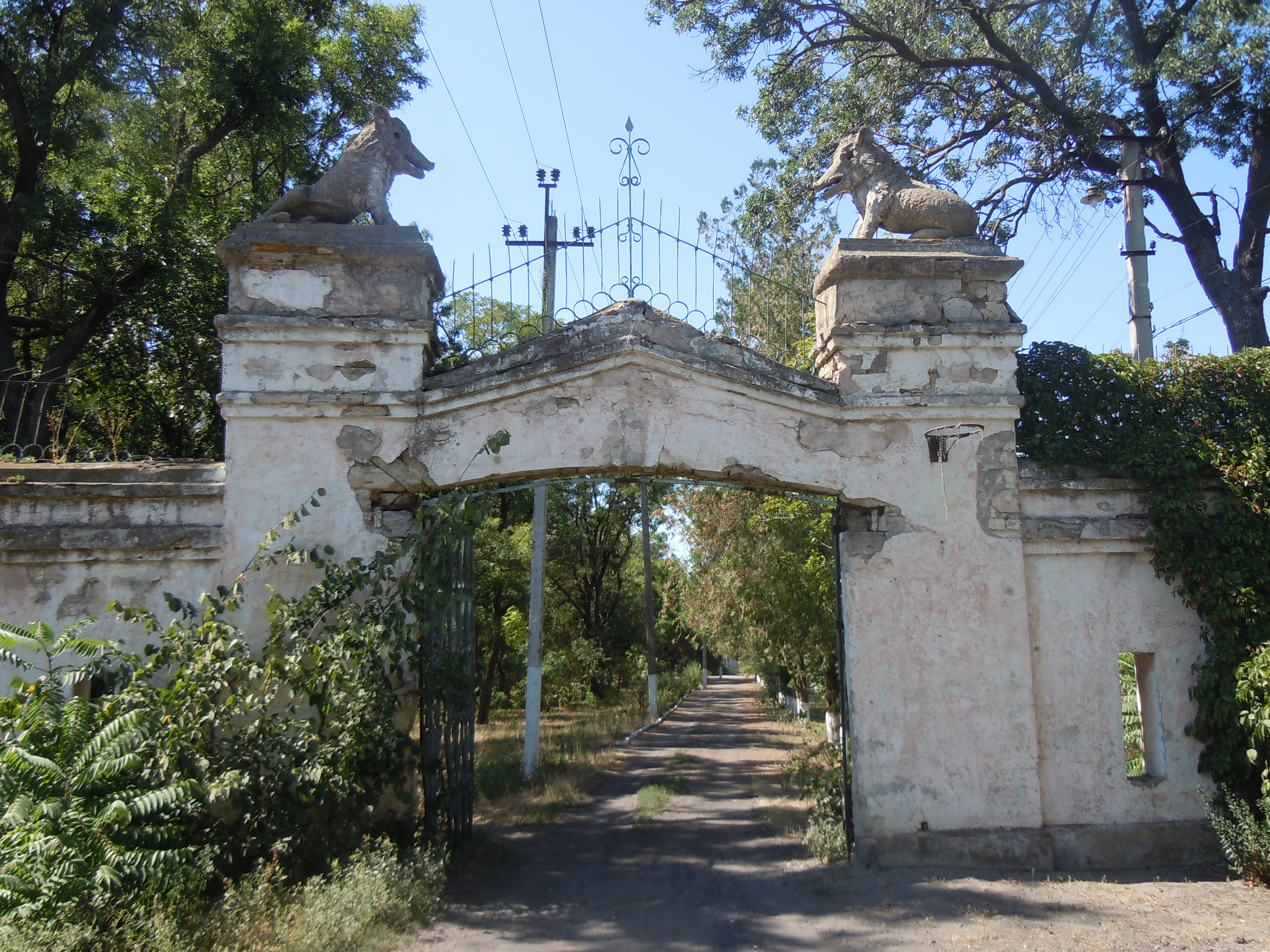
the gate of the Rauch Castle in Zavodivka

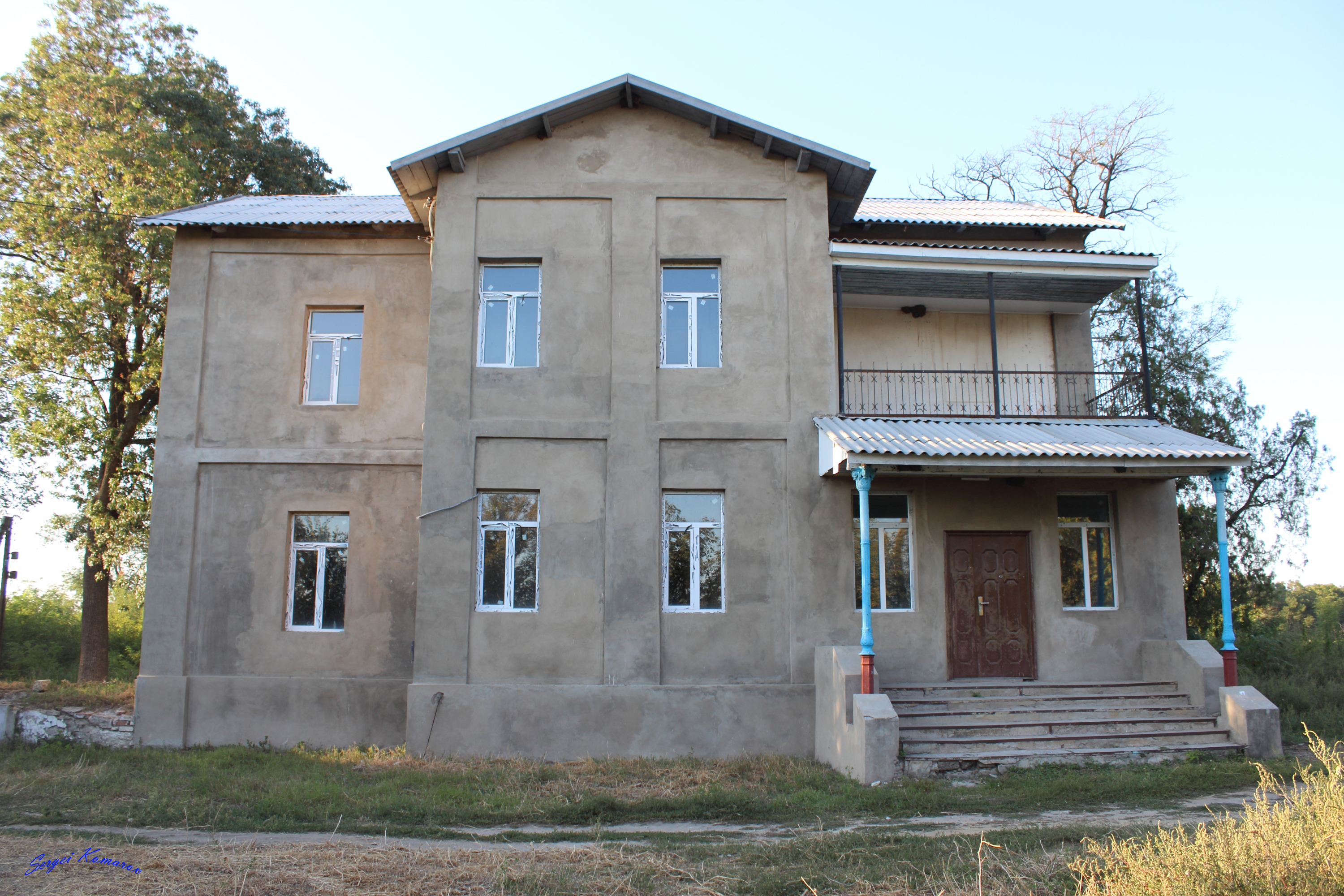
Poplawski manor in Petrovirivka
