= Administrative divisions of Dnipropetrovsk Oblast =

Dnipropetrovsk Oblast is subdivided into districts (raions) which are further subdivided into territorial communities (hromadas).

== Current ==
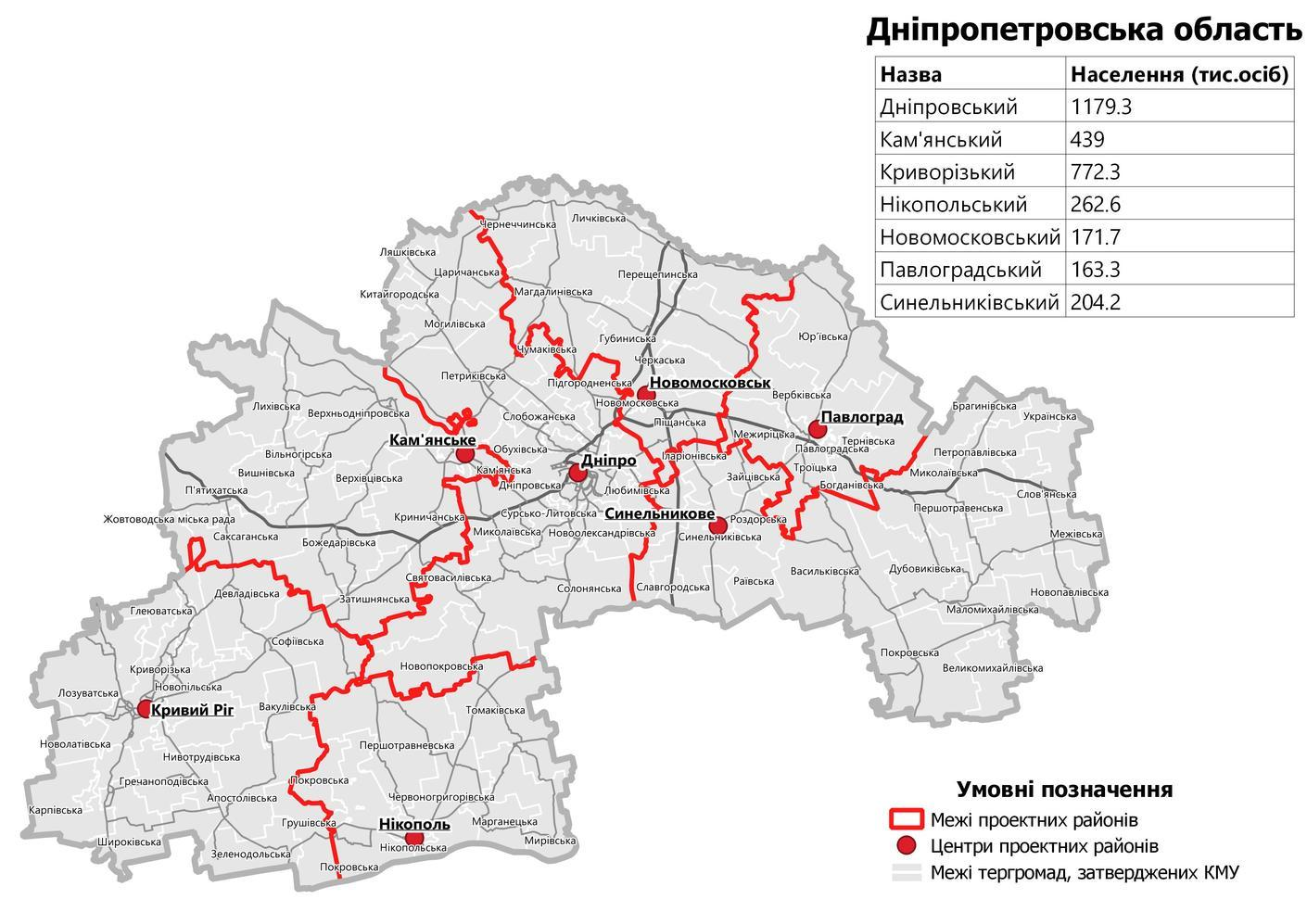
Raions of Dnipropetrovsk Oblast as of August 2020.

On 18 July 2020, the number of districts was reduced to seven. These are:

1. Dnipro (Дніпровський район), the center is in the city of Dnipro;
2. Kamianske (Кам'янський район), the center is in the city of Kamianske;
3. Kryvyi Rih (Криворізький район), the center is in the city of Kryvyi Rih;
4. Nikopol (Нікопольський район), the center is in the city of Nikopol;
5. Pavlohrad (Павлоградський район), the center is in the city of Pavlohrad;
6. Samar (Самарівський район), the center is in the city of Samar;
7. Synelnykove (Синельниківський район), the center is in the city of Synelnykove.

Dnipropetrovsk Oblast
As of January 1, 2022
Number of districts (райони)	7
Number of hromadas (громади)	86

== Administrative divisions until 2020 ==
Raions of Dnipropetrovsk Oblast as of June 2020. The city of Dnipropetrovsk is shown in dark blue.

Before July 2020, Dnipropetrovsk Oblast was subdivided into 35 regions: 22 districts (raions) and 13 city municipalities (mis'krada or misto), officially known as territories governed by city councils.

- Cities under the oblast's jurisdiction:
  - Dnipro Municipality
    - Cities under the city's jurisdiction:
      - Dnipro (Дніпро), formerly Dnipropetrovsk, the administrative center of the oblast
    - Urban-type settlements under the city's jurisdiction:
      - Aviatorske (Авіаторське)
  - Kamianske Municipality
    - Cities under the city's jurisdiction:
      - Kamianske (Кам'янське), formerly Dniprodzerzhynsk
    - Urban-type settlements under the city's jurisdiction:
      - Karnaukhivka (Карнаухівка)
  - Kryvyi Rih Municipality
    - Cities under the city's jurisdiction:
      - Kryvyi Rih (Кривий Ріг)
  - Marhanets Municipality
    - Cities under the city's jurisdiction:
      - Marhanets (Марганець)
    - Urban-type settlements under the city's jurisdiction:
      - Marivka (Мар'ївка)
  - Nikopol (Нікополь)
  - Novomoskovsk (Новомосковськ)
  - Pavlohrad (Павлоград)
  - Pershotravensk (Першотравенськ)
  - Pokrov Municipality
    - Cities under the city's jurisdiction:
      - Pokrov (Покров)
    - Urban-type settlements under the city's jurisdiction:
      - Chortomlyk (Чортомлик)
      - Hirnytske (Гірницьке)
  - Synelnykove (Синельникове)
  - Ternivka Municipality
    - Cities under the city's jurisdiction:
      - Ternivka (Тернівка)
  - Vilnohirsk (Вільногірськ)
  - Zhovti Vody Municipality
    - Cities under the city's jurisdiction:
      - Zhovti Vody (Жовті Води)
- Districts (raions):
  - Apostolove (Апостолівський район)
    - Cities under the district's jurisdiction:
      - Apostolove (Апостолове)
      - Zelenodolsk (Зеленодольськ)
  - Dnipro (Дніпровський район)
    - Cities under the district's jurisdiction:
      - Pidhorodne (Підгородне)
    - Urban-type settlements under the district's jurisdiction:
      - Obukhivka (Обухівка), formerly Kirovske
      - Slobozhanske (Слобожанське), formerly Yuvileine
  - Krynychky (Криничанський район)
    - Urban-type settlements under the district's jurisdiction:
      - Auly (Аули)
      - Bozhedarivka (Божедарiвка), formerly Shchorsk
      - Krynychky (Кринички)
  - Kryvyi Rih (Криворізький район)
    - Urban-type settlements under the district's jurisdiction:
      - Khrystoforivka (Христофорівка)
      - Radushne (Радушне)
  - Mahdalynivka (Магдалинівський район)
    - Urban-type settlements under the district's jurisdiction:
      - Mahdalynivka (Магдалинівка)
  - Mezhova (Межівський район)
    - Urban-type settlements under the district's jurisdiction:
      - Demuryne (Демурине)
      - Mezhova (Межова)
  - Nikopol (Нікопольський район)
    - Urban-type settlements under the district's jurisdiction:
      - Chervonohryhorivka (Червоногригорівка)
  - Novomoskovsk (Новомосковський район)
    - Cities under the district's jurisdiction:
      - Pereshchepyne (Перещепине)
    - Urban-type settlements under the district's jurisdiction:
      - Cherkaske (Черкаське)
      - Hubynykha (Губиниха)
      - Hvardiiske (Гвардійське)
      - Melioratyvne (Меліоративне)
  - Pavlohrad (Павлоградський район)
  - Petropavlivka (Петропавлівський район)
    - Urban-type settlements under the district's jurisdiction:
      - Petropavlivka (Петропавлівка)
      - Zaliznychne (Залізничне), formerly Bragynivka
  - Petrykivka (Петриківський район)
    - Urban-type settlements under the district's jurisdiction:
      - Kurylivka (Курилівка)
      - Mykolaivka (Миколаївка)
      - Petrykivka (Петриківка)
  - Piatykhatky (П'ятихатський район)
    - Cities under the district's jurisdiction:
      - Piatykhatky (П'ятихатки)
    - Urban-type settlements under the district's jurisdiction:
      - Lykhivka (Лихівка)
      - Vyshneve (Вишневе)
  - Pokrovske (Покровський район)
    - Urban-type settlements under the district's jurisdiction:
      - Pokrovske (Покровське)
      - Prosiana (Просяна)
  - Shyroke (Широківський район)
    - Urban-type settlements under the district's jurisdiction:
      - Shyroke (Широке)
  - Sofiivka (Софіївський район)
    - Urban-type settlements under the district's jurisdiction:
      - Sofiivka (Софіївка)
  - Solone (Солонянський район)
    - Urban-type settlements under the district's jurisdiction:
      - Novopokrovka (Новопокровка)
      - Solone (Солоне)
  - Synelnykove (Синельниківський район)
    - Urban-type settlements under the district's jurisdiction:
      - Ilarionove (Іларіонове)
      - Rozdory (Роздори)
      - Sad (Сад)
      - Slavhorod (Славгород)
  - Tomakivka (Томаківський район)
    - Urban-type settlements under the district's jurisdiction:
      - Tomakivka (Томаківка)
  - Tsarychanka (Царичанський район)
    - Urban-type settlements under the district's jurisdiction:
      - Tsarychanka (Царичанка)
  - Vasylkivka (Васильківський район)
    - Urban-type settlements under the district's jurisdiction:
      - Chaplyne (Чаплине)
      - Pysmenne (Письменне)
      - Vasylkivka (Васильківка)
  - Verkhnodniprovsk (Верхньодніпровський район)
    - Cities under the district's jurisdiction:
      - Verkhivtseve (Верхівцеве)
      - Verkhnodniprovsk (Верхньодніпровськ)
    - Urban-type settlements under the district's jurisdiction:
      - Dniprovske (Дніпровське)
      - Novomykolaivka (Новомиколаївка)
  - Yurivka (Юр'ївський район)
    - Urban-type settlements under the district's jurisdiction:
      - Yurivka (Юр'ївка)
