= List of cities in Dnipropetrovsk Oblast =

Location of cities in Dnipropetrovsk Oblast

There are 20 populated places in Dnipropetrovsk Oblast, Ukraine, that have been officially granted city status (Ukrainian: місто, romanized: misto) by the Verkhovna Rada, the country's parliament. Settlements with more than 10,000 people are eligible for city status, although the status is typically also granted to settlements of historical or regional importance. As of 5 December 2001, the date of the first and only official census in the country since independence, (Note: As of 11 July 2023) the most populous city in the oblast was the regional capital, Dnipro, with a population of 1,080,846 people, while the least populous city was Pereshchepyne, with 10,041 people. After the enactment of decommunization laws, three cities within the oblast, including the regional capital, were renamed in 2016 for their former names' connection to people, places, events, and organizations associated with the Soviet Union. The renamed cities Dnipro, Kamianske, and Pokrov were previously named Dnipropetrovsk, Dniprodzerzhynsk, and Ordzhonikidze, respectively. In 2024–2025, following the passage of derussification laws, the cities Novomoskovsk, Pershotravensk, and Pidhorodne were renamed Samar, Shakhtarske, and Pidhorodnie respectively. For their contributions to the country's defense during the Russian invasion, three cities in the oblast (Marhanets, Nikopol, and Pavlohrad) were awarded with the honorary title Hero City of Ukraine in 2025.

From independence in 1991 to 2020, 13 cities in the oblast were designated as cities of regional significance (municipalities), which had self-government under city councils, while the oblast's remaining 7 cities were located in 22 raions (districts) as cities of district significance, which are subordinated to the governments of the raions. On 18 July 2020, an administrative reform abolished and merged the oblast's raions and cities of regional significance into seven new, expanded raions. The seven raions that make up the oblast are Dnipro, Kamianske, Kryvyi Rih, Nikopol, Pavlohrad, Samar, and Synelnykove.

== List of cities ==
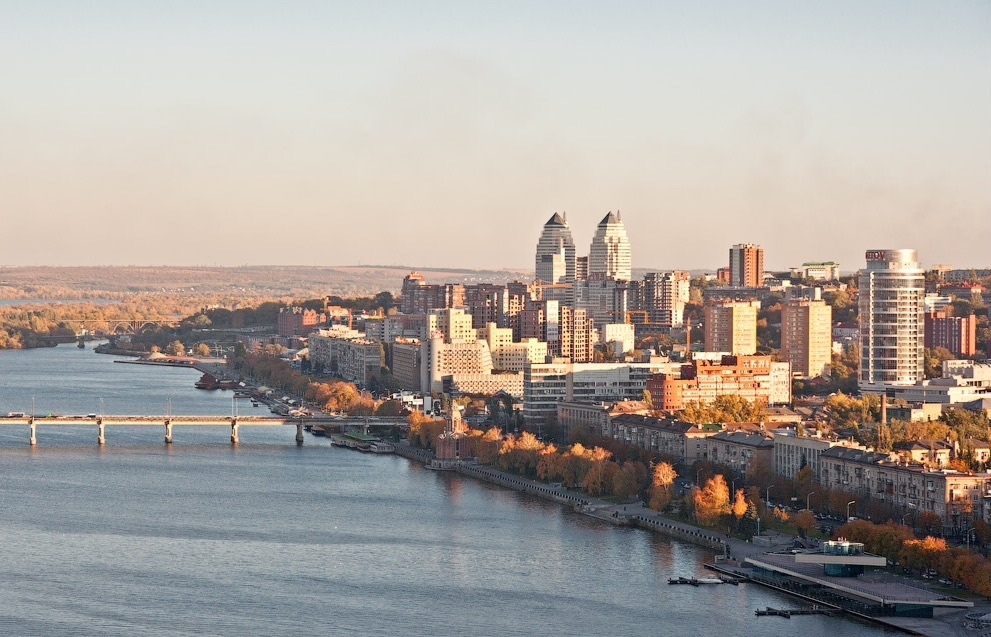
Dnipro, capital and most populous city in Dnipropetrovsk Oblast

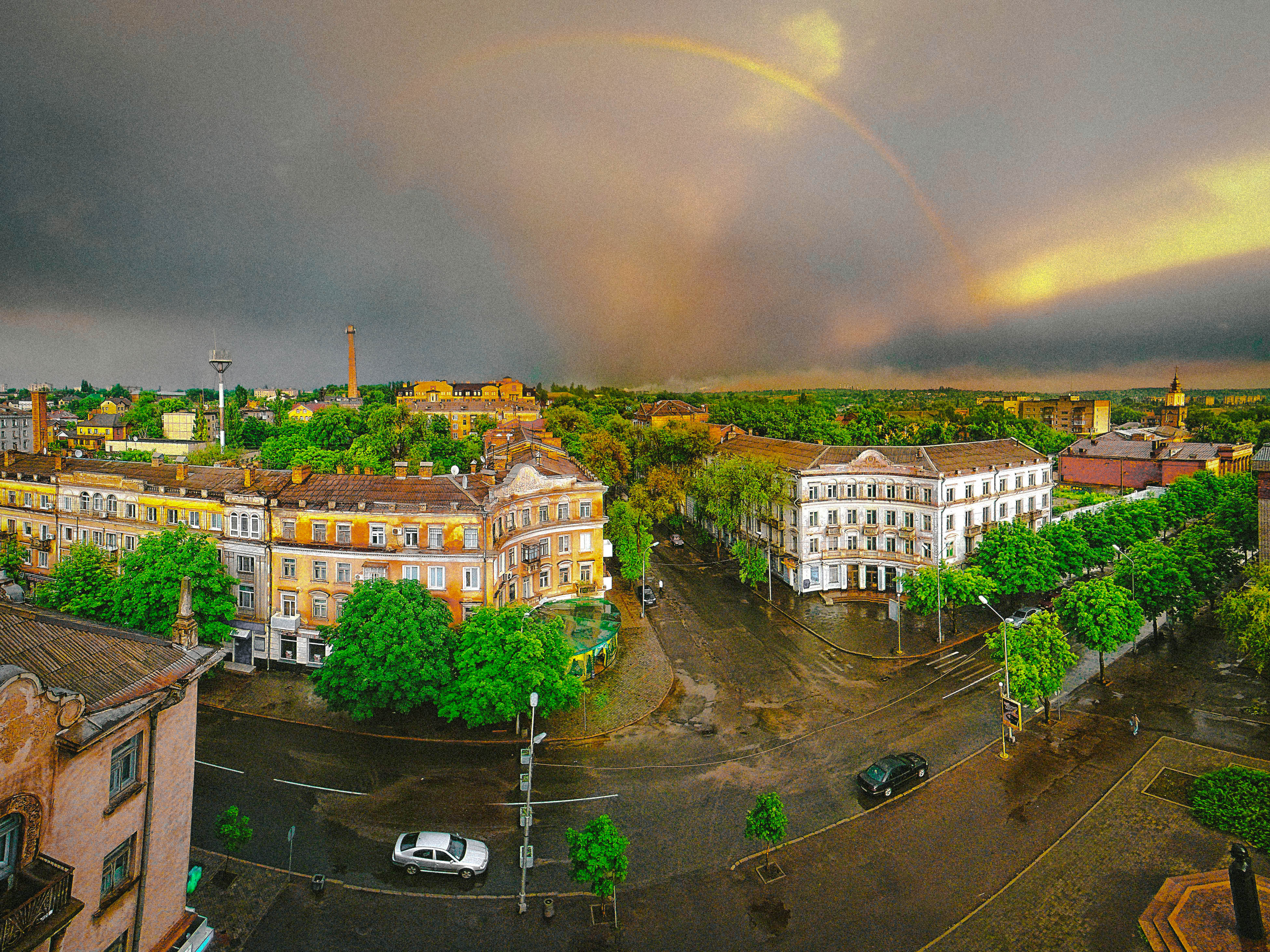
Kryvyi Rih, second most populous city in the oblast and the longest city in the country

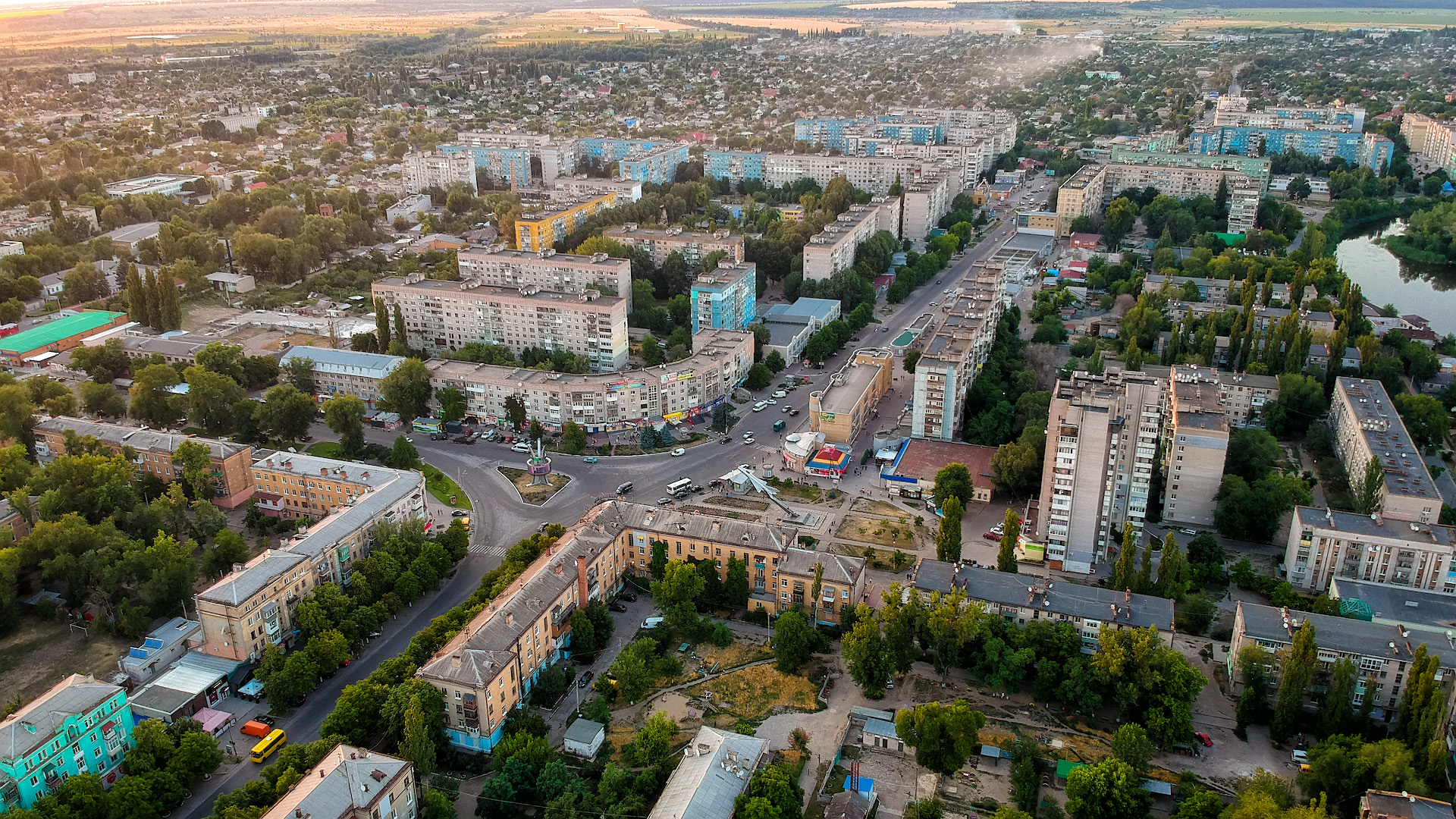
Samar, sixth most populous city known for its Cossack cathedral

Cities in Dnipropetrovsk Oblast
Name	Name (in Ukrainian) (Note: Links to the Ukrainian Wikipedia articles for each city)	Raion (district)	Population (2022 estimates)	Population (2001 census)	Population change
Apostolove	Апостолове	Kryvyi Rih	13,069	16,439	−20.50%
Dnipro	Дніпро	Dnipro	968,502	1,080,846	−10.39%
Kamianske	Кам'янське	Kamianske	226,845	255,841	−11.33%
Kryvyi Rih	Кривий Ріг	Kryvyi Rih	603,904	709,014	−14.82%
Marhanets	Марганець	Nikopol	44,980	49,592	−9.30%
Nikopol	Нікополь	Nikopol	105,160	136,280	−22.84%
Pavlohrad	Павлоград	Pavlohrad	101,430	118,816	−14.63%
Pereshchepyne	Перещепине	Samar	9,639	10,041	−4.00%
Piatykhatky	П'ятихатки	Kamianske	18,140	20,563	−11.78%
Pidhorodnie	Підгороднє	Dnipro	19,138	17,763	+7.74%
Pokrov	Покров	Nikopol	37,493	44,834	−16.37%
Samar	Самар	Samar	69,855	72,439	−3.57%
Shakhtarske	Шахтарське	Synelnykove	27,099	29,140	−7.00%
Synelnykove	Синельникове	Synelnykove	29,651	32,302	−8.21%
Ternivka	Тернівка	Pavlohrad	26,961	29,226	−7.75%
Verkhivtseve	Верхівцеве	Kamianske	9,948	10,142	−1.91%
Verkhnodniprovsk	Верхньодніпровськ	Kamianske	15,477	16,976	−8.83%
Vilnohirsk	Вільногірськ	Kamianske	22,079	23,782	−7.16%
Zelenodolsk	Зеленодольськ	Kryvyi Rih	12,692	14,792	−14.20%
Zhovti Vody	Жовті Води	Kamianske	42,052	53,582	−21.52%

== See also ==
- List of cities in Ukraine
