= Mykolaivka, Obukhivka settlement hromada, Dnipro Raion, Dnipropetrovsk Oblast =

Rural locality in Dnipropetrovsk Oblast, Ukraine

Mykolaivka Миколаївка
- Rural settlement
- Location in Dnipropetrovsk Oblast Location in Ukraine
- Coordinates: 48°32′27″N 34°42′27″E
- Country: Ukraine
- Oblast: Dnipropetrovsk Oblast
- Raion: Dnipro Raion

Population (2021)
  - Total: 1,132
- Time zone: UTC+2 (EET)
  - Summer (DST): UTC+3 (EEST)

Mykolaivka (Ukrainian: Миколаївка; Russian: Николаевка) is a rural settlement in Dnipro Raion, Dnipropetrovsk Oblast, Ukraine. It is located on the right bank of the Dnieper, across from the city of Kamianske. Mykolaivka belongs to Obukhivka settlement hromada, one of the hromadas of Ukraine. It has a population of 1,132 (2022 estimate).

== History ==
Until 18 July 2020, Mykolaivka belonged to Petrykivka Raion. The raion was abolished in July 2020 as part of the administrative reform of Ukraine, which reduced the number of raions of Dnipropetrovsk Oblast to seven. The area of Petrykivka Raion was merged into Dnipro Raion.

Until 26 January 2024, Mykolaivka was designated urban-type settlement. On this day, a new law entered into force which abolished this status, and Mykolaivka became a rural settlement.

== Economy ==
=== Transportation ===
Mykolaivka has access to Highway H08 which connects Kamianske and Kremenchuk, as well as to Highway H31 connecting Dnipro and Reshetylivka with further access to Poltava and Kyiv.

The closest railway station (52 km) is in Kurylivka on the railway connecting Kamianske and Dnipro via Balivka, approximately 10 kilometres (6.2 mi) from the settlement. There is infrequent passenger traffic.

== See also ==
- List of urban-type settlements in Ukraine
