= Lyubov Vorona =

Ukrainian politician (1931–2021)

- Born: Lyubov Kyrylivna Vorona; 7 April 1931; Olenivka, Mahdalynivka Raion, Dnipropetrovsk Oblast, Ukrainian SSR
- Died: 2 July 2021 (aged 90); Ukraine
- Occupations: Farm worker Politician
- Years active: 1950–2021
- Spouse: Oleksandr Pylypovich (m. 1955; died 2006)
- Children: 2
- Awards: Medal "For Labour Valour"; Hero of Socialist Labour; Order of Lenin; Order of the October Revolution; Order of the Red Banner of Labour (x2); Order of Princess Olga, 3rd class Order of Friendship of Peoples; Medal "For Distinguished Labour"

Lyubov Kyrylivna Vorona (Ukrainian: Любов Кирилівна Ворона; 7 April 1931 – July 2021) was a Ukrainian farm worker and politician. She worked as a senior zootechnician and livestock specialist (later chief livestock specialist) in the Chkalov collective farm's Zhdanovsky and Polivanovsky sections. Vorona was secretary of the Novomayachkovsky District Committee of the Komsomol of Ukraine and led the collective farm "Gigant" from 1973 to 1977 as well as the reproductive complex of the collective farm "For the World" from 1990 to 1994. She was a deputy of both the ninth convocation of the Supreme Soviet of the Ukrainian Soviet Socialist Republic and the Dnipropetrovsk Oblast Council and was a member of the Central Committee of the Communist Party of Ukraine. Vorona was the recipient of various government awards such as the Order of Lenin and the Hero of Socialist Labour.

== Biography ==
Vorona was born on 7 April 1931 in Olenivka in the Mahdalynivka Raion, Dnipropetrovsk Oblast, Ukraine. She was the youngest of four children in a peasant family of collective farmers who moved to the Mahdalynivka Raion in the early 1920s from the surrounding Poltava Oblast. Vorona's mother, Natalia Mykytivna Vorona, died when she was five years old in 1936, and she was raised alone by her father, Kyrylo Kuzmych, the secretary of the local village organisation. In 1939, she enrolled at the Olenivsk seven-year school. Vorona excelled academically and graduated in 1947.

When the Great Patriotic War began in June 1941, she and her elder sister were assigned to bring farm livestock such as cows and sheep across the Volga, while her two older brothers died fighting on the front lines. When Germany took over the village in September 1941, the sisters lived under German occupation and remained so until September 1943. When the Mahdalynivka Raion was liberated in 1943, Vorona resumed her studies as her family rebuilt their home. She attended a flight school in Dnipropetrovsk in 1947 before enrolling in the Babaykovskiy Zootechnical School, where she graduated in 1950.

Vorona was assigned to the Kherson Oblast as a senior zootechnician of the Novomayachkiv Agricultural Department's propaganda and agitation department after developing an interest in agricultural science, agricultural work, and agrarian policy. She was made secretary of the Komsomol of Ukraine's Novomayachkovsky District Committee. Vorona became ill with typhus in 1953 and was taken to her birthplace for treatment by her father and sister. Following her recuperation in the same year, she was appointed a livestock specialist (later head livestock specialist) in the Chkalov collective farm's Zhdanovsky and Polivanovsky sections, Mahdalynivka Raion, Dnipropetrovsk Oblast. Vorona was appointed deputy foreman of the integrated livestock brigade, foreman of livestock farm No. 1 and leader of the Za Mir communal farm's dairy division in 1958. She was a 1973 graduate of the Higher Party School at the Central Committee of the CPSU, after four years of studying.

Vorona chaired the collective farm "Gigant" in the village of Zhdanivka from 1973 until 1977, when the previous chair retired, and she produced excellent results for the farm. She chaired the executive committee of the Magdalino District Council of People's Deputies of the Dnepropetrovsk Region from 1977 to 1984 before becoming the First Secretary of the Communist Party of the Dnepropetrovsk Region's Magdalino District Committee from 1984 to 1989. Vorona oversaw the construction of various buildings, a large-scale gasification of the region, and the May 1985 opening of the district historical and local history museum. She headed the reproductive complex of the collective farm "For the World" from 1990 to 1994, then worked as a housewife between 1994 and 1996 and then headed the fattening complex of the agricultural limited liability company "Agro-Oven" from 1996 to 2001 before becoming its deputy director general of human resources personnel in 2001.

In 1953, she became a member of the CPSU. Vorona was an elected deputy of the ninth convocation of the Supreme Soviet of the Ukrainian Soviet Socialist Republic from 1978 to 1982 and was on the Dnipropetrovsk Oblast Council between 1982 and 1986. From 1958 to 2002, she was a deputy of the Magdalinovskiy District Council. She was a delegate to the 21st and 22nd Congresses of the CPSU, as well as the 23rd Congress of the Communist Party of Ukraine and the 27th Congress of the Communist Party of Ukraine. From 1965 to 1976, Vorona was a member of the Central Audit Commission of the Communist Party of Ukraine and of the Central Committee of the Communist Party of Ukraine between 1976 and 1986. During the era of perestroika, Vorona chaired the district society for the struggle for sobriety, the council of veterans of Olenovka village and was a member of the presidium of the councils of veterans of the Magdalinivska Settlement Territorial Community and the Dnipropetrovsk Oblast. She ceased to be a member of the CPSU in 1991.

== Personal life ==
From 1955 until his death in 2006, Vorona was married to agriculture worker Oleksandr Pylypovich. They had two children. She died in July 2021.

== Awards ==
Vorona was the recipient of various government awards. She was given the Medal "For Labour Valour" on 7 March 1960. Vorona was conferred the title of Hero of Socialist Labour with the Order of Lenin and the "Hammer and Sickle" gold medal "for the successes achieved in the development of animal husbandry, the increase in the production of meat, milk, eggs, wool and other products" by a decree of the Supreme Soviet of the Soviet Union on 22 March 1966.

She received the Order of the October Revolution on 8 April 1971 and was twice conferred the Order of the Red Banner of Labour on 8 December 1973 and 24 December 1976. Vorona got the Order of Princess Olga, 3rd class on 13 November 2001. She was presented with the Certificate of Honor of the Presidium of the Supreme Soviet of the Ukrainian SSR, the Order of Friendship of Peoples and the Medal "For Distinguished Labour". In the early 2000s, Vorona was made an Honorary Citizen of the Mahdalynivka Raion of the Dnipropetrovsk Oblast.
