= Melioratyvne =

Rural locality in Dnipropetrovsk Oblast, Ukraine

Melioratyvne Меліоративне
- Rural settlement
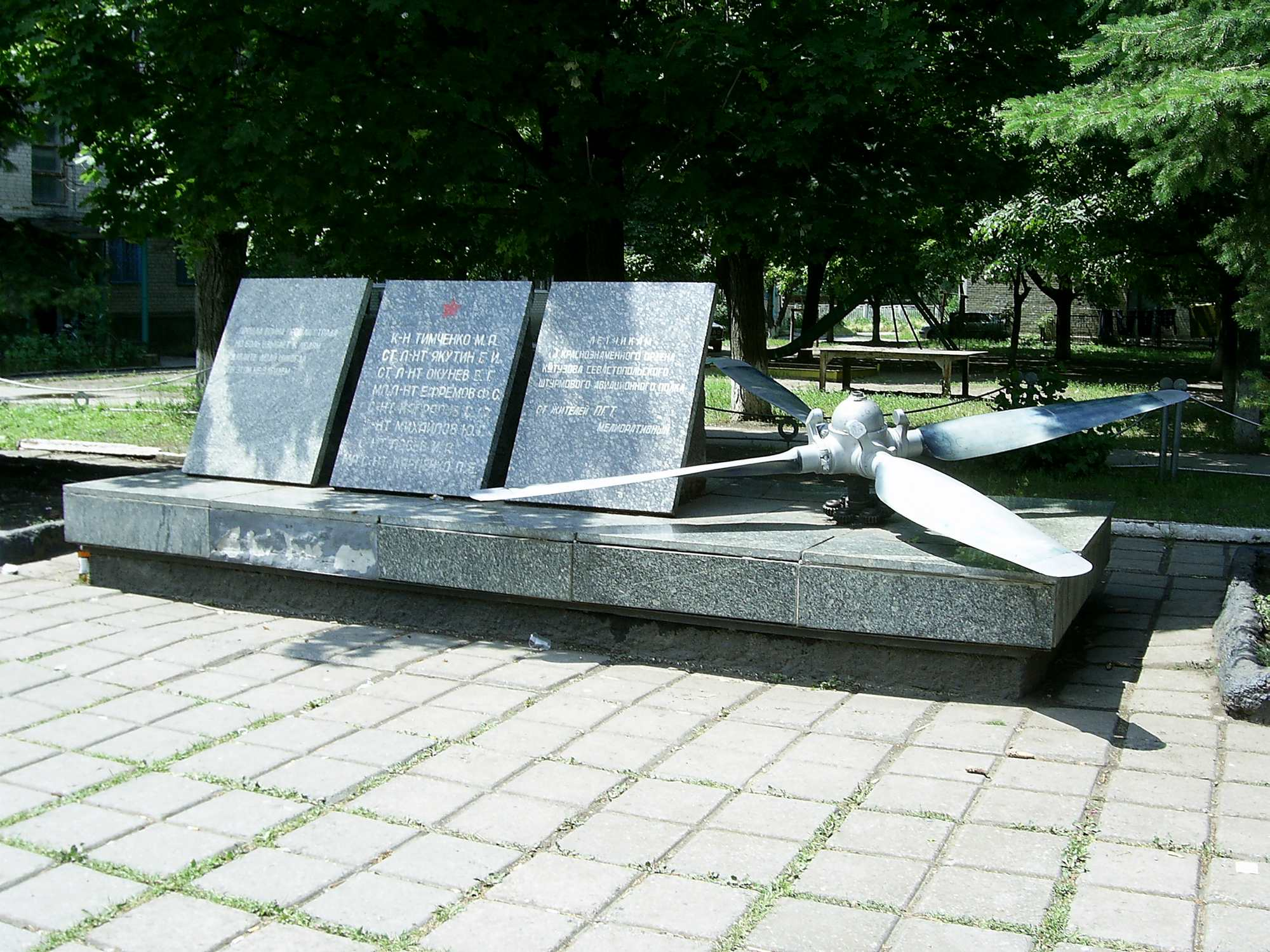

- Location in Dnipropetrovsk Oblast Location in Ukraine
- Coordinates: 48°37′07″N 35°24′05″E
- Country: Ukraine
- Oblast: Dnipropetrovsk Oblast
- Raion: Novomoskovsk Raion

Population (2022)
  - Total: 3,963
- Time zone: UTC+2 (EET)
  - Summer (DST): UTC+3 (EEST)

Melioratyvne (Ukrainian: Меліоративне; Russian: Мелиоративное) is a rural settlement in Novomoskovsk Raion, Dnipropetrovsk Oblast, Ukraine. It is located a few kilometers east of Novomoskovsk. Melioratyvne belongs to Pishchanka rural hromada, one of the hromadas of Ukraine. Population: 3,953 (2022 estimate).

Until 26 January 2024, Melioratyvne was designated urban-type settlement. On this day, a new law entered into force which abolished this status, and Melioratyvne became a rural settlement.

== Economy ==
=== Transportation ===
Orlivshchyna railway station, located in Melioratyvne, is on the railway which connects Novomoskovsk and Pavlohrad with further connections to Dnipro, Kharkiv, and Zaporizhia. As of 2020, there is no passenger traffic. The closest station with passenger traffic is Novomoskovsk-Dniprovskyi.

The settlement has access to Highway M04 which connects Dnipro via Pavlohrad with Pokrovsk and to Highway M18 connecting Kharkiv with Zaporizhia and Melitopol.
