= Battle of Petrikowka =

Battle of WWII

- Part of Operation Barbarossa on the Eastern Front of World War II
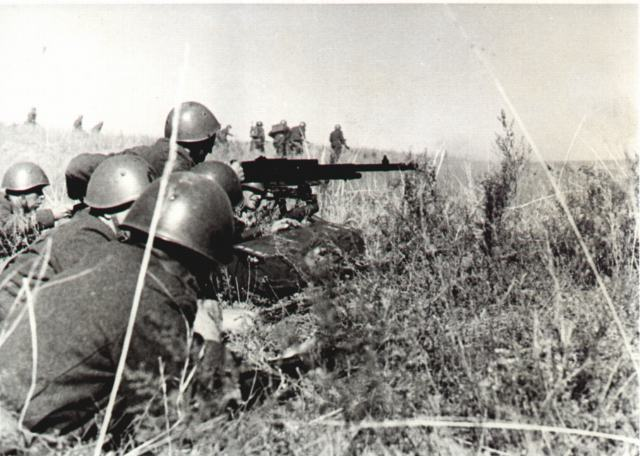
- Italian CCNN troops during Operation Barbarossa.
Date	27–30 September 1941
Location	Petrykivka, Ukraine
Result	Italian victory

Belligerents
Italy	Soviet Union

Commanders and leaders
(Kingdom of Italy) Giovanni Messe	(Soviet Union) Ivan Galanin

Units involved
3rd Cavalry Division "Principe Amedeo Duca d'Aosta"; 9th Infantry Division "Pasubio"; 52nd Infantry Division "Torino"	Soviet 47th Tank Division; Soviet 261st Rifle Division; Soviet 273rd Rifle Division

Strength
3 divisions	3 divisions

Casualties and losses
87 killed 190 wounded 14 missing	Unspecified killed 10,000 prisoners

The Battle of Petrikowka (present-day Petrykivka, Ukraine) took place between 27 and 30 September 1941, during World War II. Fought between Italian and Soviet forces, it was the first significant engagement involving the Italian Expeditionary Corps in Russia.

== Formation of bridgeheads ==
On 16 September 1941 the 9th Infantry Division "Pasubio" was temporarily aggregated to the German 17th Army of Heeresgruppe Sud under Field Marshal von Rundstedt, and on 18 September it took position along the Oril river. On 23 September, the "Pasubio" created a bridgehead at Tsarytchanka, beyond the Dnieper river, in order to allow the German armoured units to cross to the other bank. Soviet forces launched heavy attacks against the bridgehead for three days, but it resisted; farther north, the division's 80th Infantry Regiment "Roma" launched a surprise attack and created another bridgehead at Voinovka. These two bridgeheads allowed German armoured units to cross the river with their tanks and thus break through the Soviet lines.

Meanwhile, the 52nd Infantry Division "Torino" and the 63rd CC.NN. Assault Legion "Tagliamento" were transferred to Dnipropetrovsk, whereas the 3rd Cavalry Division "Principe Amedeo Duca d'Aosta" was left to garrison the positions along the Dnieper and prepare for crossing.

== Capture of Petrikowka ==
The German plan called now for encirclement of the Soviet forces, therefore a pincer movement, converging on the town of Petrikowka, was decided. The Italian Expeditionary Corps in Russia of General Giovanni Messe was tasked with this manoeuver; the "Pasubio" division (now back under Italian command) would attack from north-east, and the "Torino" Division from south-east.

In the morning of 28 September 1941 the "Torino" attacked the Soviet forces, in order to broaden the bridgehead and reach Obuskvskje. Soviet forces put up a tenacious resistance, but despite this and the minefields the "Torino" eventually broke through the lines held by the Soviet 47th Tank Division (which was equipped with obsolescent T-26 light tanks), and supporting Red Army infantry units, near Petrikowka.

On the following day, both the "Torino" and the "Pasubio" divisions were ordered to carry on with their advance towards Petrikowka, where the two divisions were to rejoin and thus cut off the Soviet retreat. At the same time, the 3rd Cavalry Division would send two Bersaglieri battalions of the 3rd Bersaglieri Regiment on the other bank of the Dnieper, to start to sweep up the Soviet soldiers trapped in the pocket. The two regiments of the "Torino" division (81st and 82nd Infantry Regiment "Torino") and the Tagliamento Legion started their advance in the morning, clashing with several dissolving Soviet units and taking a number of prisoners. The vanguards of the "Torino" were the first to reach Petrikowka, where they met units from the "Pasubio" around 18:00. The 3rd Cavalry Division, after crossing the river, started the sweeping operations, and rejoined the other Italian units in Petrikowka in the evening. The sweeps continued on the following day.

Total Italian casualties numbered 291 men, of whom 87 were killed, 190 wounded and 14 missing. About 10,000 Soviet prisoners were captured, along with large quantities of weapons, horses, trucks and supplies.

== Bibliography ==
- "Le operazioni delle unità italiane al fronte russo (1941–1943)", Italian Army Historical Branch, Rome, 1993
- Pierluigi Romeo di Colloredo, "Croce di ghiaccio", Genoa, 2010
- Leonardo Malatesta, "Storia della legione Tagliamento, Dalla fondazione alla guerra di Russia", vol 1°, Pietro Macchione Editore, Varese, 201.
- Jowett, The Italian Army 1940–45 (3), pg.10
- Soboski, Marek, "Mussolini's Eastern Crusade: The Italian Expeditionary Corps in Operation Barbarossa", Zielona Góra, Ikona, 2021, ISBN 979-8-4809-2656-9
