= Sad, Dnipropetrovsk Oblast =

Rural locality in Dnipropetrovsk Oblast, Ukraine

Sad Сад
- Rural settlement
- Location in Dnipropetrovsk Oblast Location in Ukraine
- Coordinates: 48°25′32″N 35°15′01″E
- Country: Ukraine
- Oblast: Dnipropetrovsk
- Raion: Synelnykove

Population (2022)
  - Total: 496
- Time zone: UTC+2 (EET)
  - Summer (DST): UTC+3 (EEST)

Sad (Ukrainian: Сад; Russian: Сад) is a rural settlement in Synelnykove Raion, Dnipropetrovsk Oblast, Ukraine. It is located midway between Dnipro and Synelnykove. Sad belongs to Ilarionove settlement hromada, one of the hromadas of Ukraine. Population: 496 (2022 estimate).

Until 26 January 2024, Sad was designated urban-type settlement. On this day, a new law came into effect which abolished this status, and Sad was reclassified as a rural settlement.

== Economy ==
=== Transportation ===
The settlement has access to Highway M18 connecting Kharkiv with Zaporizhzhia and Melitopol. It is also connected by road with Dnipro.

The railway station in Sad, 212 km, is on the railway connecting Dnipro and Synelnykove. There is suburban passenger traffic.
