= Pysmenne =

Rural locality in Dnipropetrovsk Oblast, Ukraine

Pysmenne Письменне
- Rural settlement
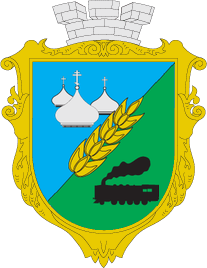
- Flag Coat of arms

- Location within Dnipropetrovsk Oblast Location within Ukraine
- Coordinates: 48°12′12″N 35°48′16″E
- Country: Ukraine
- Oblast: Dnipropetrovsk Oblast
- Raion: Synelnykove Raion

Population (2022)
  - Total: 1,147
- Time zone: UTC+2 (EET)
  - Summer (DST): UTC+3 (EEST)

Pysmenne (Ukrainian: Письменне; Russian: Письменное) is a rural settlement in Synelnykove Raion, Dnipropetrovsk Oblast, Ukraine. It belongs to Vasylkivka settlement hromada, one of the hromadas of Ukraine. Population: 1,147 (2022 estimate).

== History ==
Until 18 July 2020, Pysmenne belonged to Vasylkivka Raion. The raion was abolished in July 2020 as part of the administrative reform of Ukraine, which reduced the number of raions of Dnipropetrovsk Oblast to seven. The area of Vasylkivka Raion was merged into Synelnykove Raion.

Until 26 January 2024, Pysmenne was designated urban-type settlement. On this day, a new law entered into force which abolished this status, and Pysmenne became a rural settlement.

== Economy ==
=== Transportation ===
Pysmenne is on a railway which connects Dnipro via Synelnykove with Pokrovsk. There is a passenger railway station in the settlement.

Pysmenne is also included in a relatively dense network of roads of eastern Dnipropetrovsk Oblast. It has access to Vasylkivka and Synelnykove, and from there to Dnipro, Zaporizhzhia, and Donetsk Oblast.
