= Demuryne =

Rural locality in Dnipropetrovsk Oblast, Ukraine

Demuryne Демурине
- Rural settlement
- Location in Dnipropetrovsk Oblast Location in Ukraine
- Coordinates: 48°10′34″N 36°28′30″E
- Country: Ukraine
- Oblast: Dnipropetrovsk Oblast
- Raion: Synelnykove Raion

Population (2022)
  - Total: 966
- Time zone: UTC+2 (EET)
  - Summer (DST): UTC+3 (EEST)

Demuryne (Ukrainian: Демурине; Russian: Демурино) is a rural settlement in Synelnykove Raion, Dnipropetrovsk Oblast, in eastern Ukraine. It is located at the east of the oblast, approximately 150 kilometres (93 mi) east of Dnipro. Demuryne belongs to Mezhova settlement hromada, one of the hromadas of Ukraine. Population: 966 (2022 estimate).

== History ==
During the Ukrainian War of Independence, from 1917 to 1920, it passed between various factions. Afterwards it was administratively part of the Zaporizhzhia Governorate of Ukraine.

Until 18 July 2020, Demuryne belonged to Mezhova Raion. The raion was abolished in July 2020 as part of the administrative reform of Ukraine, which reduced the number of raions of Dnipropetrovsk Oblast to seven. The area of Mezhova Raion was merged into Synelnykove Raion.

Until 26 January 2024, Demuryne was designated urban-type settlement. On this day, a new law entered into force which abolished this status, and Demuryne became a rural settlement.

== Economy ==
=== Transportation ===
Demuryne railway station is on the railway connecting Synelnykove with Pokrovsk. There is regular local passenger traffic.

The settlement is on Highway H15 which connects Zaporizhia and Donetsk which is only operational until Marinka since Donetsk is controlled by the separatist forces of the Donetsk People's Republic. Demuryne is also connected by road with Pokrovsk via Mezhova.
