= Pereshchepyne urban hromada =

Pereshchepyne urban hromada Перещепинська міська громада
- Hromada
- Interactive map of Pereshchepyne urban hromada
- Country: Ukraine
- Oblast: Dnipropetrovsk Oblast
- Raion: Samar Raion
- Admin. center: Pereshchepyne

Area
  - Total: 573.85 km^{2} (221.56 sq mi)

Population (2018)
  - Total: 21,305
  - Density: 37.126/km^{2} (96.157/sq mi)
- CATOTTG code: UA12100090000022751
- Settlements: 21
- Cities: 1
- Rural settlements: 3
- Villages: 17
- Website: pereschepynske.otg.dp.gov.ua/ua

Pereshchepyne urban hromada (Ukrainian: Перещепинська міська територіальна громада, romanized: Pereshchepynska miska terytorialna hromada) is one of the hromadas of Ukraine, located in Samar Raion within Dnipropetrovsk Oblast. The administrative center is the city of Pereshchepyne.

The area of the territory is 573.85 square kilometres (221.56 mi^{2}), the population of the hromada is 21,305 (2018).

== History ==
Formed on February 2, 2018, by merging the territories and settlements of Pereshchepyne City and Bahate, Holubivka, Kernosivka, Mykhailivka Village Councils of Novomoskovsk Raion and Shandrivka Village Council of Yurivka Raion of Dnipropetrovsk Oblast.

== Composition ==
In addition to one city (Pereshchepyne), the hromada contains three rural settlements (Kilchen, Myroliubivka and Vyshneve) and 17 villages:

- Bahate
- Hannivka
- Holubivka
- Kernosivka
- Kozyrshchyna
- Leventsivka
- Malokozyrshchyna
- Mykhailivka
- Novoshandrivka
- Oleksandriia
- Orilka
- Panasivka
- Rivne
- Shandrivka
- Svichanivka
- Troitske
- Voskresenivka
