= Mahdalynivka =

Rural locality in Dnipropetrovsk Oblast, Ukraine

Mahdalynivka Магдалинiвка
- Rural settlement
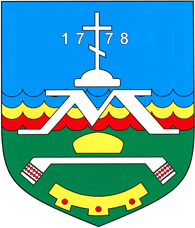
- Coat of arms

- Location within Ukraine Location within Dnipropetrovsk Oblast
- Coordinates: 48°54′57″N 34°55′06″E
- Country: Ukraine
- Oblast: Dnipropetrovsk Oblast
- Raion: Samar Raion
- Hromada: Mahdalynivka settlement hromada

Population (2022)
  - Total: 6,119
- Time zone: UTC+2 (EET)
  - Summer (DST): UTC+3 (EEST)

Mahdalynivka (Ukrainian: Магдалинiвка; Russian: Магдалиновка) is a rural settlement in Samar Raion, Dnipropetrovsk Oblast, Ukraine. It hosts the administration of Mahdalynivka settlement hromada, one of the hromadas of Ukraine. Population: 6,119 (2022 estimate).

== Description ==
Mahdalynivka is located on the Chaplynka River, a left tributary of the Dnieper. Relief around the settlement is plain with unnoticed change in elevations since it is located in Dnieper Lowlands.

Mahdalynivka is first mentioned under its current name in 1783 in connection with delimitation of lands of the former Zaporizhian Sich (Zaporizhia Free Lands). According to "History of cities and villages of the Ukrainian SSR", the start of the settlement was given by 4 families who arrived from Poltava region (at that time Poltava Governorate). Mahdalynivka appeared on territory that during times of Zaporizhian Sich belonged to Provtocha Palanka, a territorial subdivision of Zaporizhian Sich. Researcher of regional studies L.M.Bezuhlyi in his book "Krai Mahdalynivskyi" (Land of Mahdalynivka) and authors of an essay "Mahdalynivshchyna" as the year of establishment of the village consider 1778. Such conclusion was made by them based on information that was provided by notable genealogist Vadym Modzalevskyi (a co-author of Armorial of Little Russia) and a data from "Mezhevaya kniga Azovskoi Gubernii" (Azov Governorate surveying book).

Until the raion was abolished on 18 July 2020, Mahdalynivka was the administrative center of Mahdalynivka Raion. After that date, it was transferred to Novomoskovsk Raion (later renamed Samar Raion).

Until 26 January 2024, Mahdalynivka was designated urban-type settlement. On this day, a new law entered into force which abolished this status, and Mahdalynivka became a rural settlement.

== Economy ==
=== Transportation ===
Mahdalynivka is connected by roads with Dnipro and Petrykivka (with further access over the bridge to Kamianske). There are local roads as well. Distance between Mahdalynivka and Dnipro is 62.6 kilometres (38.9 mi).

The closest railway station is in Hubynykha, about 20 kilometres (12 mi) east of Mahdalynivka, on the railway line connecting Dnipro and Kharkiv.

=== Industry ===
- Mahdalynivka butter plant;
- Brick factory;
- Bakery plant;
- Municipal company;
- Private agricultural companies.
