= Khrystoforivka =

Rural locality in Dnipropetrovsk Oblast, Ukraine

Khrystoforivka Христофорівка
- Rural settlement
- Location within Dnipropetrovsk Oblast Location within Ukraine
- Coordinates: 47°58′49″N 33°05′34″E
- Country: Ukraine
- Oblast: Dnipropetrovsk Oblast
- Raion: Kryvyi Rih Raion

Population (2022)
  - Total: 1,312
  - Estimate (2024): 1,144
- Time zone: UTC+2 (EET)
  - Summer (DST): UTC+3 (EEST)

Khrystoforivka (Ukrainian: Христофорівка; Russian: Христофоровка) is a rural settlement in Kryvyi Rih Raion, Dnipropetrovsk Oblast, Ukraine. It is located on the left bank of the Bokovenka in the drainage basin of the Dnieper. It belongs to Lozuvatka rural hromada, one of the hromadas of Ukraine. Population: 1,312 (2022 estimate).

Until 26 January 2024, Khrystoforivka was designated urban-type settlement. On this day, a new law entered into force which abolished this status, and Khrystoforivka became a rural settlement.

== Economy ==
=== Transportation ===
The closest railway station is in Haikivka, about 5 kilometres (3.1 mi) southwest of Khrystoforivka, on the railway line connecting Kryvyi Rih and Dolinska, with further connections to Cherkasy and Odesa.

Khrystoforivka has access to Highway H11 connects Kryvyi Rih with Mykolaiv and Highway H23 connecting Kryvyi Rih with Kropyvnytskyi.
