= Auly =

Rural locality in Dnipropetrovsk Oblast, Ukraine

Auly Аули
- Rural settlement
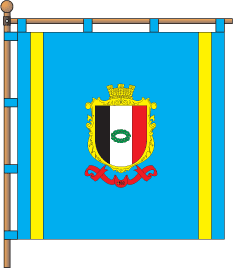
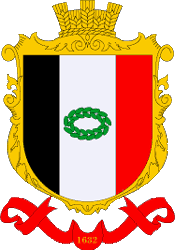
- Flag Coat of arms

- Location in Dnipropetrovsk Oblast Location in Ukraine
- Coordinates: 48.545°N 34.454°E
- Country: Ukraine
- Oblast: Dnipropetrovsk Oblast
- Raion: Kamianske Raion

Population (2022)
  - Total: 3,922
- Time zone: UTC+2 (EET)
  - Summer (DST): UTC+3 (EEST)

Auly (Ukrainian: Аули; Russian: Аулы) is a rural settlement in Kamianske Raion, Dnipropetrovsk Oblast, Ukraine. It is located on the right bank of the Kamianske Reservoir northwest of the city of Kamianske. Auly belongs to Krynychky settlement hromada, one of the hromadas of Ukraine. Population: 3,922 (2022 estimate).

== History ==
Until 18 July 2020, Auly belonged to Krynychky Raion. The raion was abolished in July 2020 as part of the administrative reform of Ukraine, which reduced the number of raions of Dnipropetrovsk Oblast to seven. The area of Krynychky Raion was merged into Kamianske Raion.

Until 26 January 2024, Auly was designated urban-type settlement. On this day, a new law entered into force which abolished this status, and Auly became a rural settlement.

== Economy ==
=== Transportation ===
The closest railway station is Voskobiinia on the railway line connecting Kamianske and Verkhivtseve. There is regular passenger traffic directly to Dnipro.

Auly has access to Highway H08 which connects Kamianske and Kremenchuk.
