= Radushne =

Rural locality in Dnipropetrovsk Oblast, Ukraine

Radushne Радушне
- Rural settlement
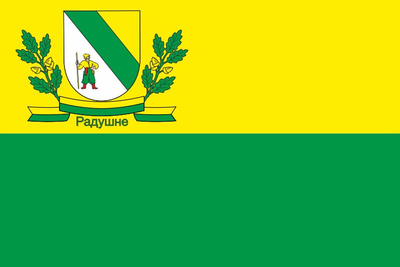
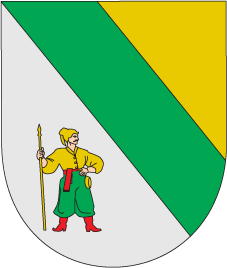
- Flag Coat of arms

- Location within Ukraine
- Coordinates: 47°49′16″N 33°30′18″E
- Country: Ukraine
- Oblast: Dnipropetrovsk Oblast
- Raion: Kryvyi Rih Raion

Population (2022)
  - Total: 3,788
- Time zone: UTC+2 (EET)
  - Summer (DST): UTC+3 (EEST)

Radushne (Ukrainian: Радушне; Russian: Радушное) is a rural settlement in Kryvyi Rih Raion, Dnipropetrovsk Oblast, Ukraine. It is located about 10 kilometres (6.2 mi) southeast of the city of Kryvyi Rih. It belongs to Novopillia rural hromada, one of the hromadas of Ukraine. Population: 3,788 (2022 estimate).

Until 26 January 2024, Radushne was designated urban-type settlement. On this day, a new law entered into force which abolished this status, and Radushne became a rural settlement.

== Demographics ==
As of the 2001 Ukrainian census, Radushne had a population of 3,366 inhabitants. The linguistic composition of the settlement's population was as follows:

Native languages in Radushne
	percent
Ukrainian	92.3%
Russian	7.0%
Belarusian	0.3%
Romanian	0.1%
Armenian	0.1%
others	0.2%

== Economy ==
=== Transportation ===
Radushna railway station, located in Radushne, is on the railway connecting Kryvyi Rih with Apostolove and further with Dnipro, Kherson, and Zaporizhia.

Radushne is on Highway H23 which connects Kryvyi Rih and Zaporizhia.
