= Kurylivka, Dnipropetrovsk Oblast =

Rural locality in Dnipropetrovsk Oblast, Ukraine

Kurylivka Курилівка
- Rural settlement
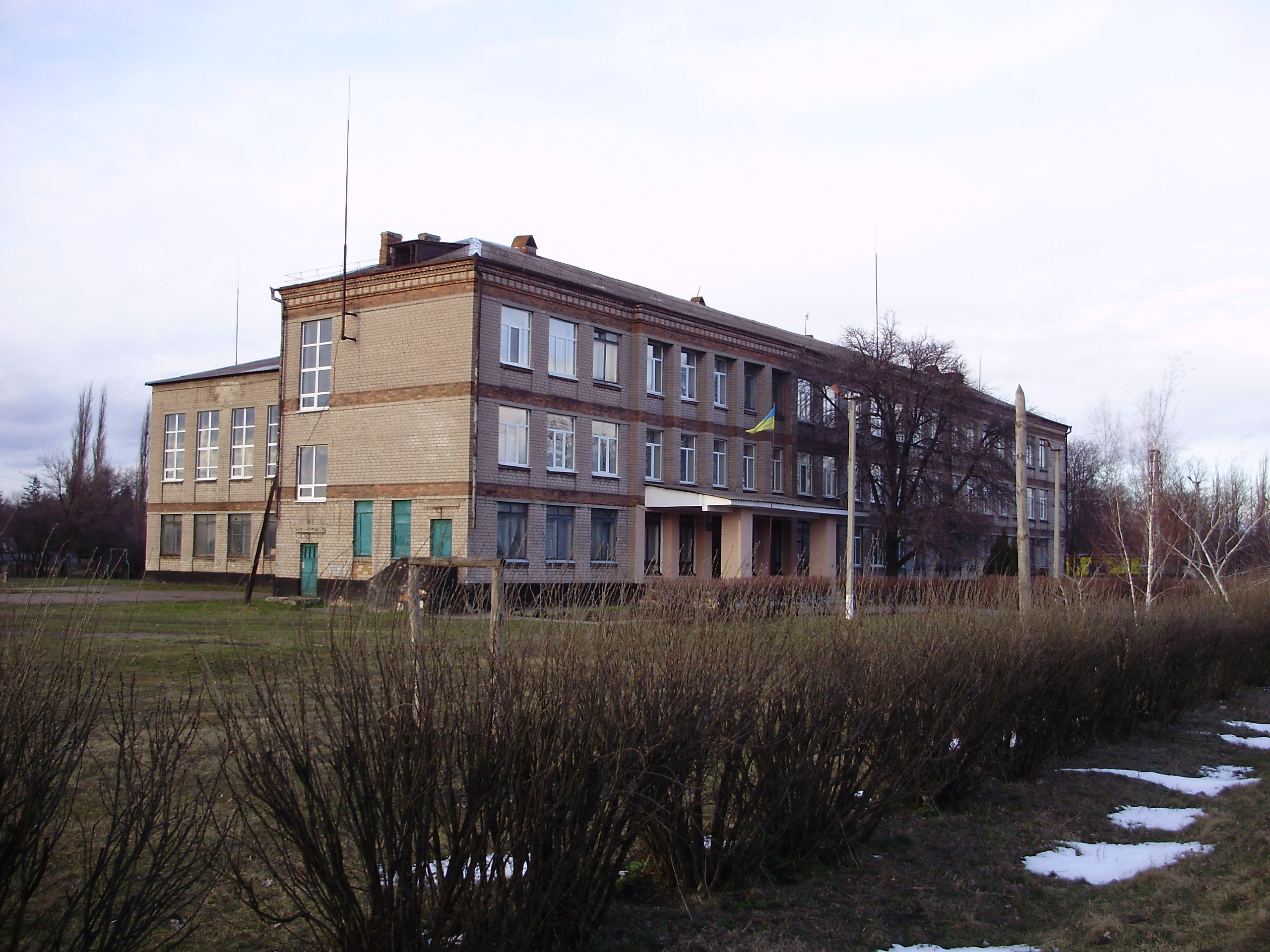
- Interactive map of Kurylivka
- Location in Dnipropetrovsk Oblast Location in Ukraine
- Coordinates: 48°34′42″N 34°36′31″E
- Country: Ukraine
- Oblast: Dnipropetrovsk Oblast
- Raion: Dnipro Raion

Population (2022)
  - Total: 2,432
- Time zone: UTC+2 (EET)
  - Summer (DST): UTC+3 (EEST)

Kurylivka (Ukrainian: Курилівка; Russian: Куриловка) is a rural settlement in Dnipro Raion, Dnipropetrovsk Oblast, Ukraine. It is located on the left bank of the Dnieper, downstream of the Kamianske Reservoir, adjacent to the left bank neighborhood of the city of Kamianske. Kurylivka belongs to Petrykivka settlement hromada, one of the hromadas of Ukraine. Population: 2,432 (2022 estimate).

== History ==
Until 18 July 2020, Kurylivka belonged to Petrykivka Raion. The raion was abolished in July 2020 as part of the administrative reform of Ukraine, which reduced the number of raions of Dnipropetrovsk Oblast to seven. The area of Petrykivka Raion was merged into Dnipro Raion.

Until 26 January 2024, Kurylivka was designated urban-type settlement. On this day, a new law entered into force which abolished this status, and Kurylivka became a rural settlement.

== Economy ==
=== Transportation ===
Kurylivka has access to Highway H08 which connects Kamianske and Kremenchuk, as well as to Highway H31 connecting Dnipro and Reshetylivka with further access to Poltava and Kyiv.

Kurylivka is on the railway connecting Kamianske and Dnipro via Balivka. There are two railway stations near the settlement, 50 km and 52 km. There is infrequent passenger traffic.
