= Zaliznychne, Dnipropetrovsk Oblast =

Rural locality in Dnipropetrovsk Oblast, Ukraine

Zaliznychne Залізничне
- Rural settlement
- Location in Dnipropetrovsk Oblast Location in Ukraine
- Coordinates: 48°25′54″N 36°29′38″E
- Country: Ukraine
- Oblast: Dnipropetrovsk Oblast
- Raion: Synelnykove Raion

Population (2022)
  - Total: 189
- Time zone: UTC+2 (EET)
  - Summer (DST): UTC+3 (EEST)

Zaliznychne (Ukrainian: Залізничне; Russian: Зализничное) is a rural settlement in Synelnykove Raion, Dnipropetrovsk Oblast, Ukraine. It is located about 100 kilometres (62 mi) east of the city of Dnipro. It belongs to Petropavlivka settlement hromada, one of the hromadas of Ukraine. Population: 189 (2022 estimate).

== History ==
Until 2016, the settlement was known as Brahynivka. On 19 May 2016, Verkhovna Rada decided to rename Brahynivka to Zaliznychne according to the law prohibiting names of Communist origin.

Until 18 July 2020, Zaliznychne belonged to Petropavlivka Raion. The raion was abolished in July 2020 as part of the administrative reform of Ukraine, which reduced the number of raions of Dnipropetrovsk Oblast to seven. The area of Petropavlivka Raion was merged into Synelnykove Raion.

Until 26 January 2024, Zaliznychne was designated urban-type settlement. On this day, a new law entered into force which abolished this status, and Zaliznychne became a rural settlement.

== Economy ==
=== Transportation ===
The settlement has access to Highway M04 which connects Dnipro via Pavlohrad with Pokrovsk.

Petropavlivka railway station, on the railway connecting Pavlohrad and Pokrovsk, is located in Zaliznychne. There is infrequent passenger traffic.
