= Mahdalynivka Raion =

Former subdivision of Dnipropetrovsk Oblast, Ukraine

Mahdalynivka Raion Магдалинівський район
- Raion
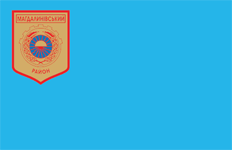
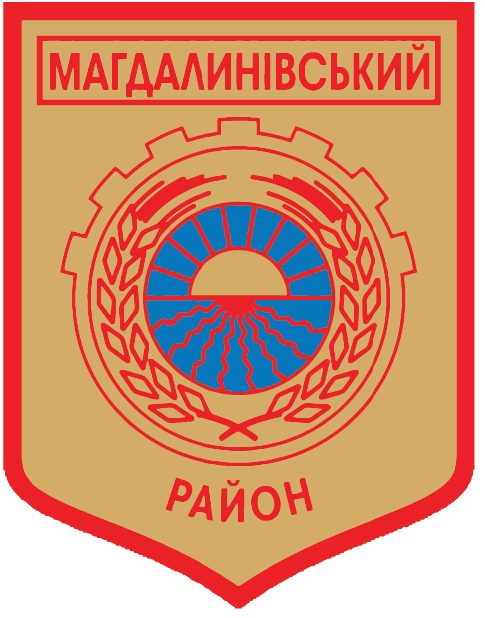
- Flag Coat of arms

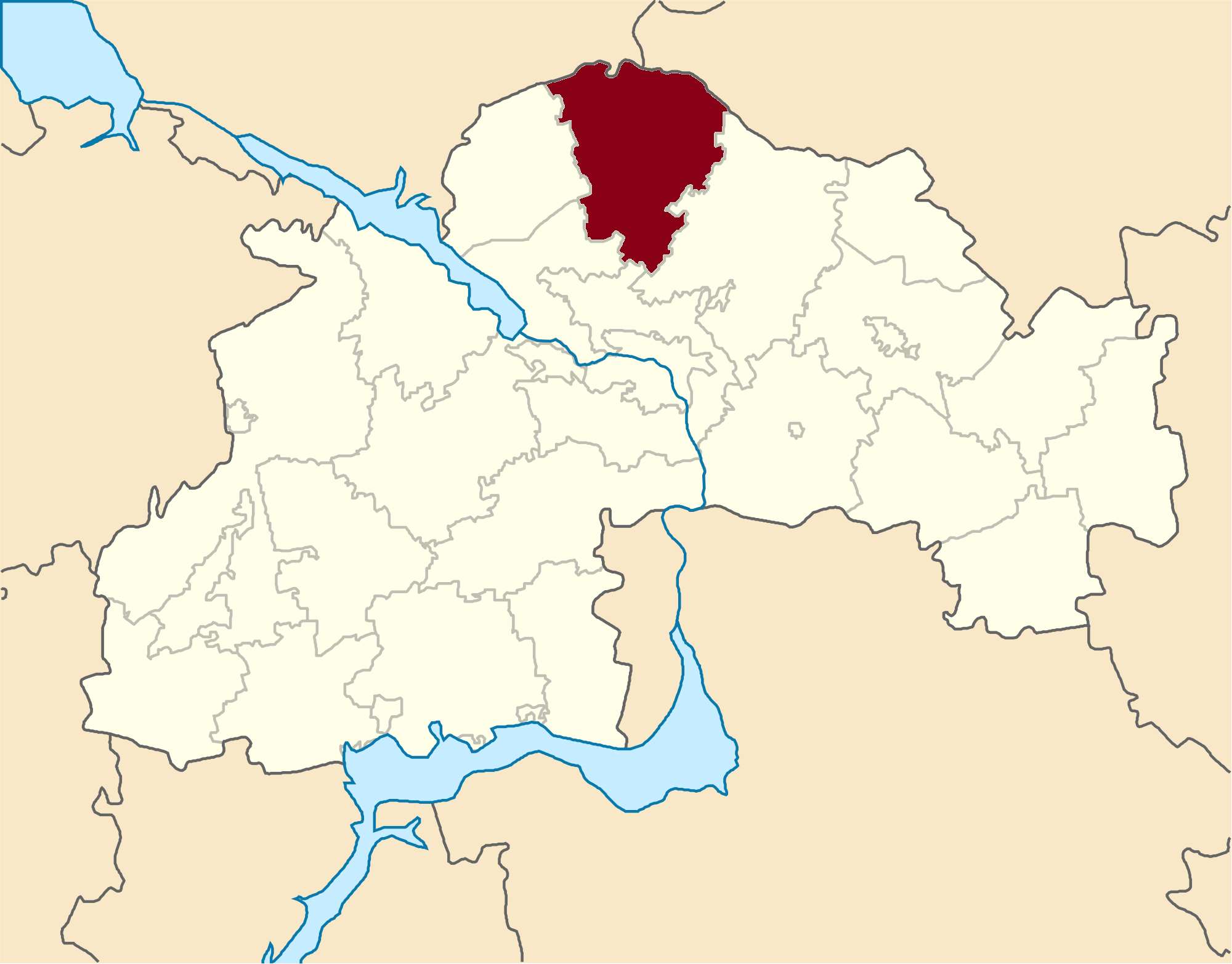
- Coordinates: 48°55′18″N 34°55′21″E
- Country: Ukraine
- Region: Dnipropetrovsk Oblast
- Disestablished: 18 July 2020
- Admin. center: Mahdalynivka
- Subdivisions: List: — city councils; — settlement councils; — rural councils; Number of localities: — cities; — urban-type settlements; — villages; — rural settlements

Area
  - Total: 1,599 km^{2} (617 sq mi)

Population (2020)
  - Total: 32,844
  - Density: 20.54/km^{2} (53.20/sq mi)
- Time zone: UTC+02:00 (EET)
  - Summer (DST): UTC+03:00 (EEST)
- Area code: +380

Mahdalynivka Raion (Ukrainian: Магдалинівський район) was a raion (district) of Dnipropetrovsk Oblast, southeastern-central Ukraine. Its administrative centre was located at the urban-type settlement of Mahdalynivka. The raion was abolished on 18 July 2020 as part of the administrative reform of Ukraine, which reduced the number of raions of Dnipropetrovsk Oblast to seven. The area of Mahdalynivka Raion was merged into Novomoskovsk Raion. The last estimate of the raion population was 32,844 (2020 est.).

At the time of disestablishment, the raion consisted of three hromadas:

- Chernechchina rural hromada with the administration in the selo of Chernechchina;
- Lychkove rural hromada with the administration in the selo of Lychkove;
- Mahdalynivka settlement hromada with the administration in Mahdalynivka.
