= Pereshchepyne =

City in Dnipropetrovsk Oblast, Ukraine

Pereshchepyne Перещепине
- City
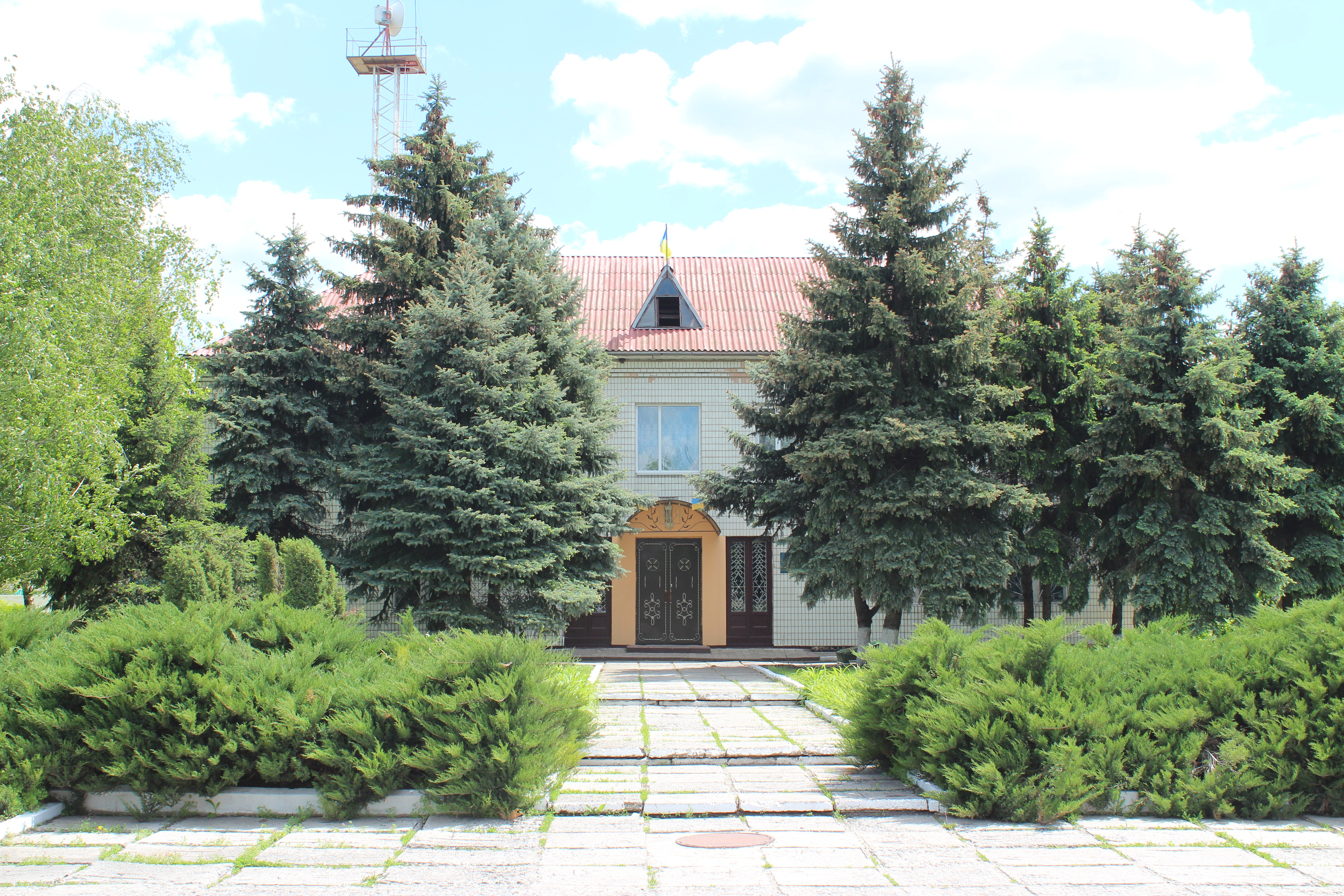
- Pereshchepyne City Hall

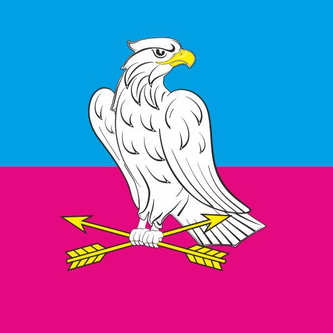
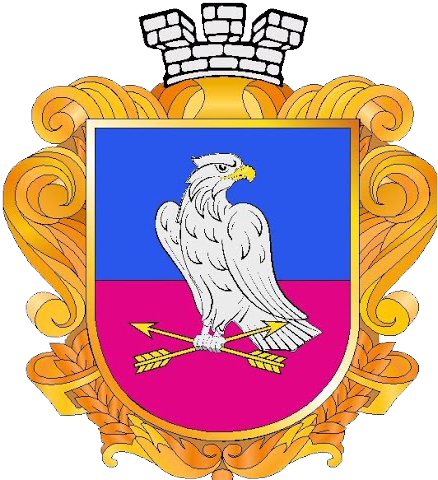
- Flag Coat of arms
- Interactive map of Pereshchepyne
- Location within Ukraine Location within Dnipropetrovsk Oblast
- Country: Ukraine
- Oblast: Dnipropetrovsk Oblast
- Raion: Samar Raion
- Hromada: Pereshchepyne urban hromada
- First mentioned: 1764
- City status: 2000

Government
  - Mayor: Vadym Malyckyj
- Elevation: 90 m (300 ft)

Population (2022)
  - Total: 9,639
- Postal code: 51220—51222
- Phone code: +380-5693

Pereschepyne (Ukrainian: Перещепине, IPA: [pereˈʃtʃɛpɪne]) is a small city in Samar Raion, Dnipropetrovsk Oblast, Ukraine. It is located 70 miles (110 km) north of the administrative center of the oblast, Dnipro. Pereshchepyne hosts the administration of Pereshchepyne urban hromada, one of the hromadas of Ukraine. Population: 9,639 (2022 estimate). In 2001, the population was 10,041.

The first written mention of Pereshchepyne dates back to 1764. It was then a part of the Oril Palanka of the Nova Sich. According to the Account of a former Cossack ... M. L. Korzh, Pereshchepyne is named listed the 17 oldest Cossack settlements in the Katerynoslav region.

== Demographics ==
As of the 2001 Ukrainian census, Pereshchpyne had a population of 10,150 inhabitants. The ethnic and linguistic composition of the population at the time of the census was as follows:

Ethnic groups in Pershchpyne
	percent
Ukrainians	86.92%
Russians	10.98%
Belarusians	0.77%
Armenians	0.27%
Germans	0.15%
Moldovans	0.11%
others	0.80%

Languages in Pereshchpyne
	percent
Ukrainian	86.0%
Russian	13.3%
Belarusian	0.3%
Armenian	0.2%
others	0.2%

== Gallery ==
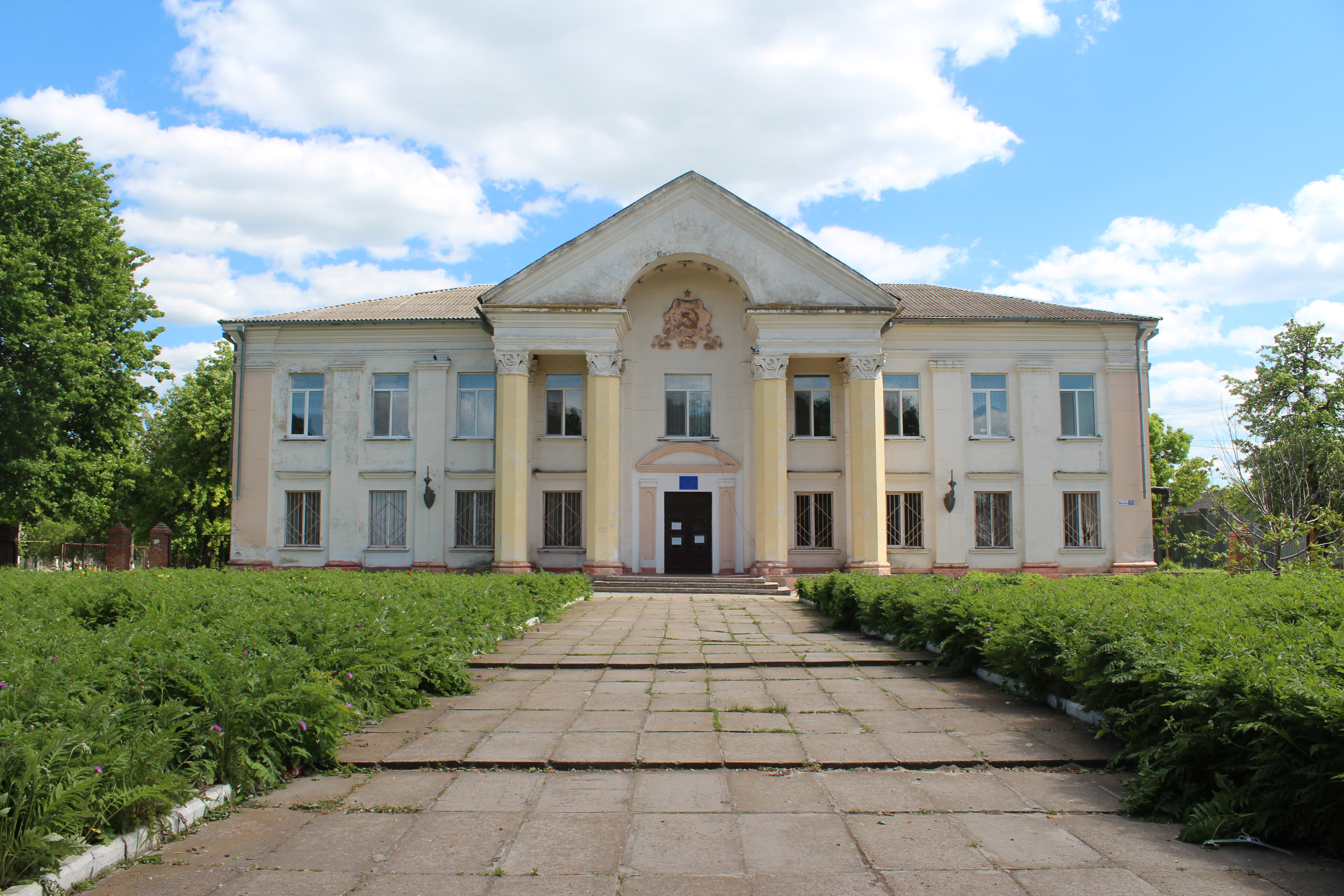
Family medicine institution in Pereshchepyne

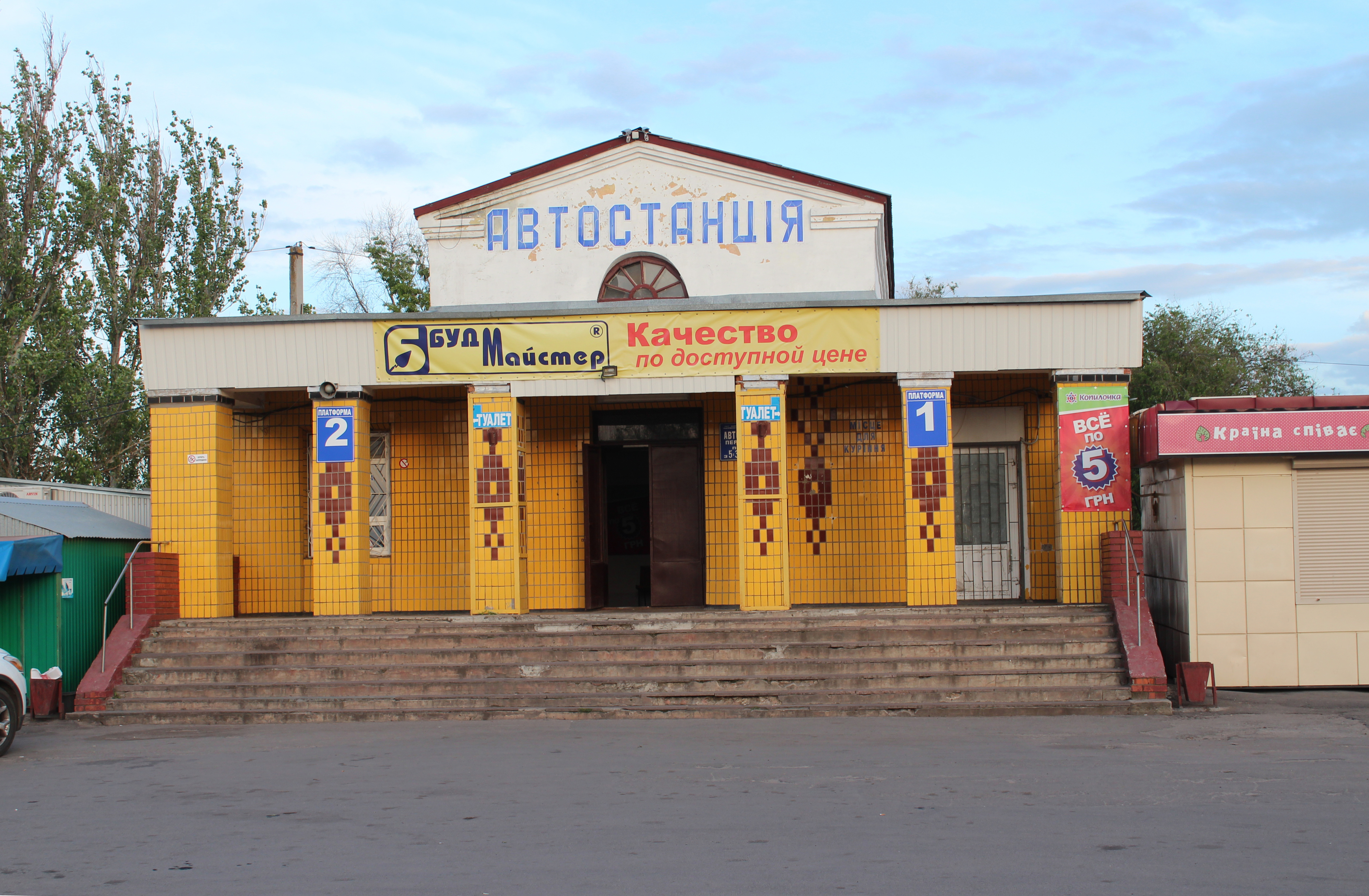
Bus station in Pereshchepyne

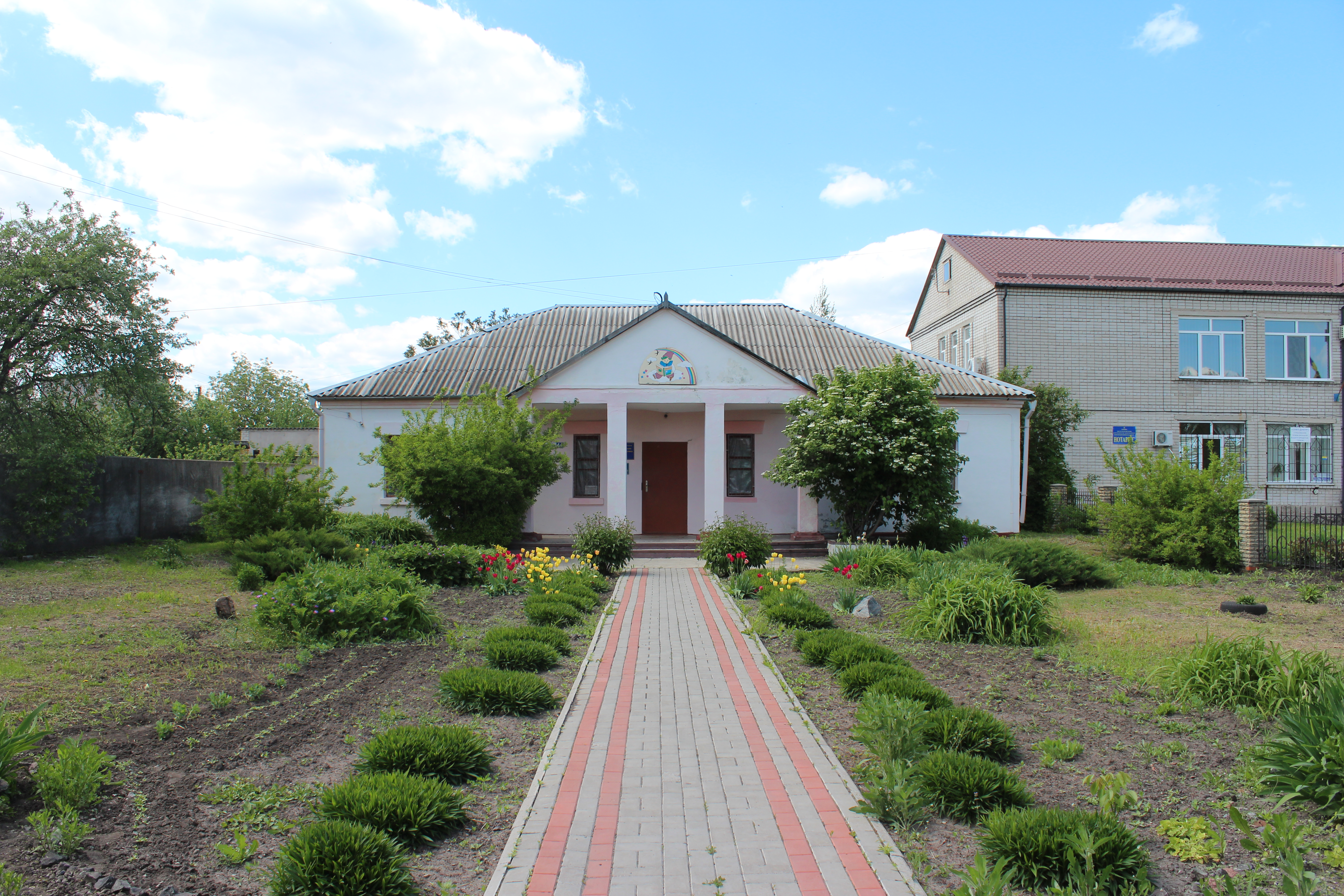
District Library for children in Pereshchepyne

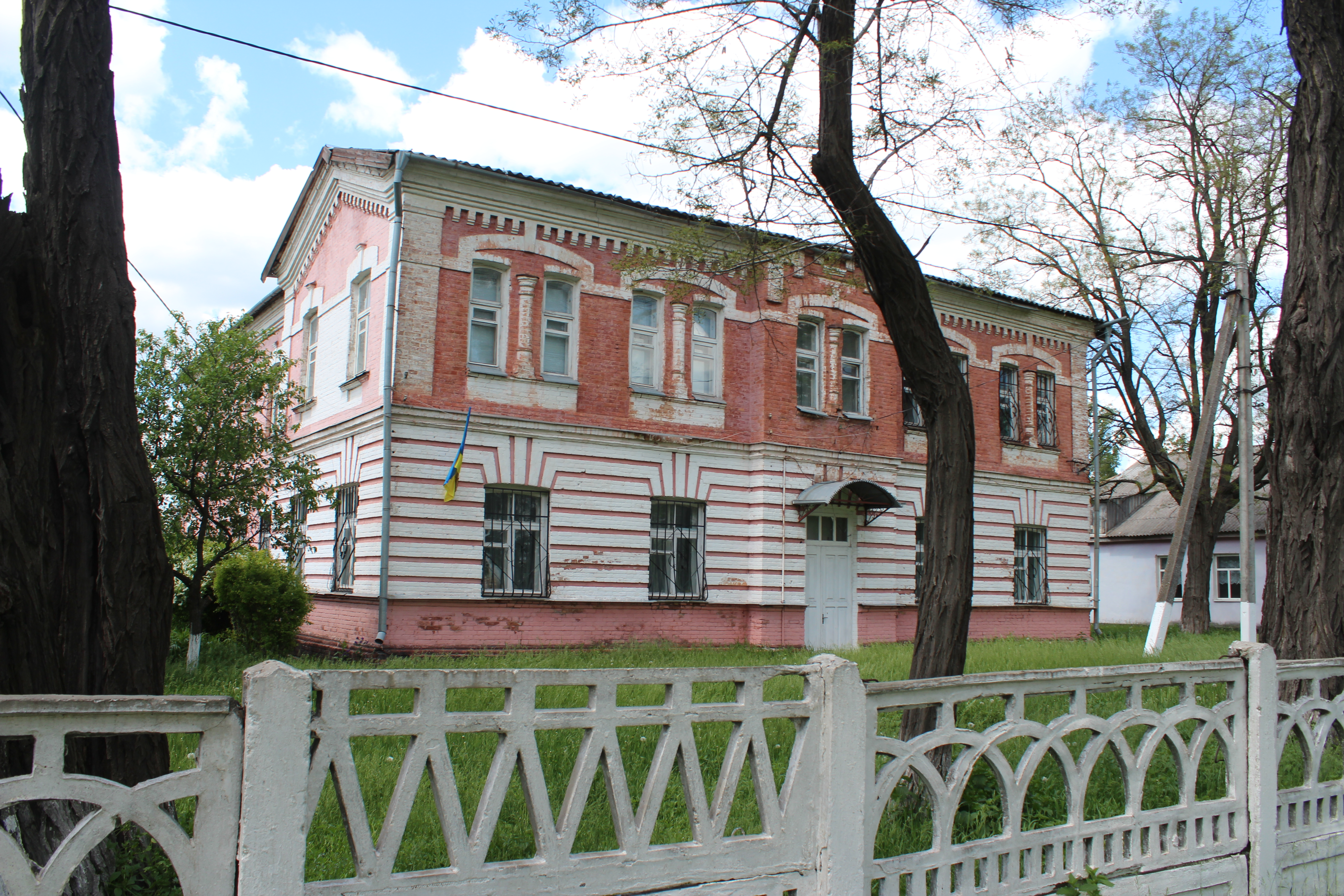
vocational school in Pereshchepyne

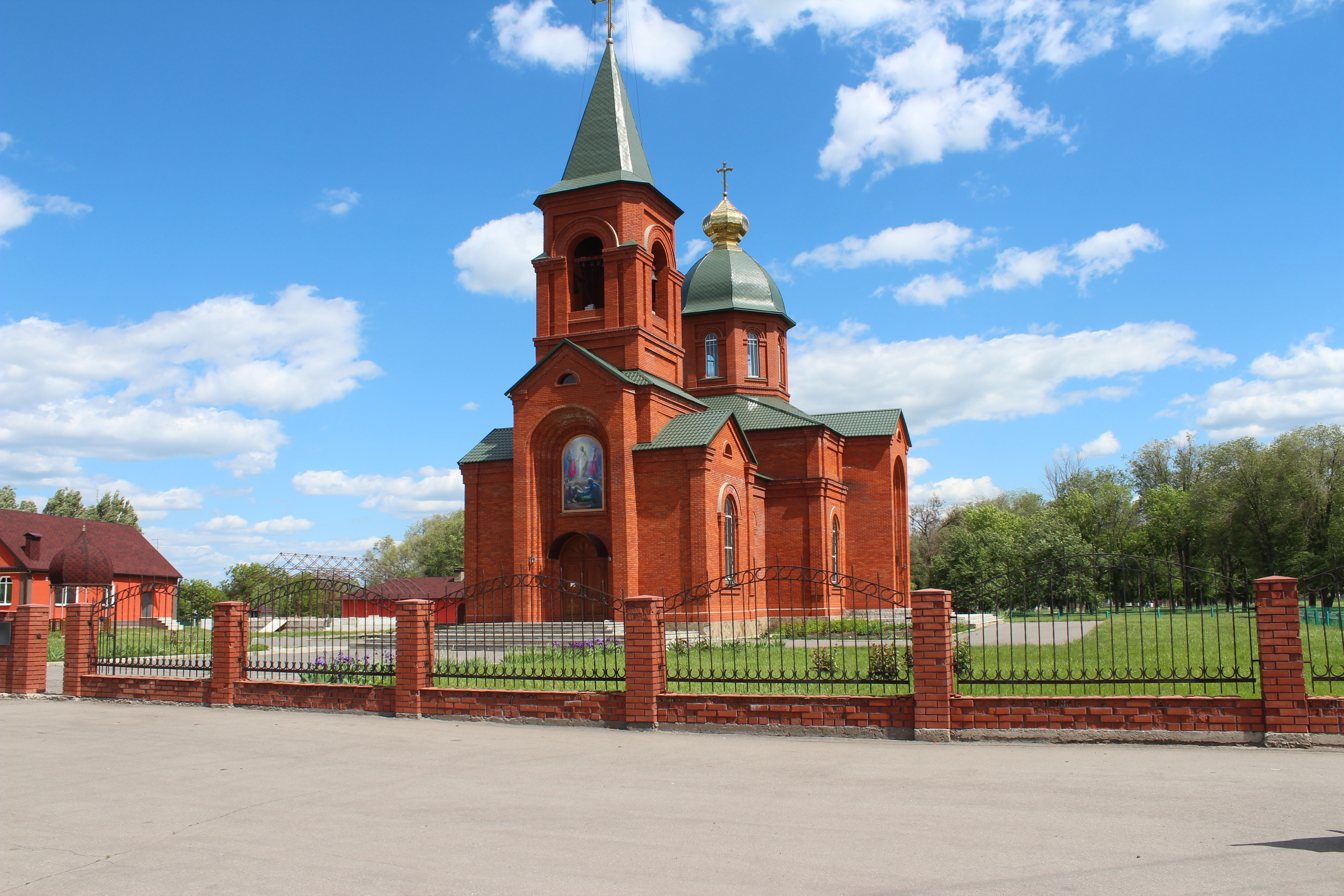
Transfiguration Church in Pereshchepyne

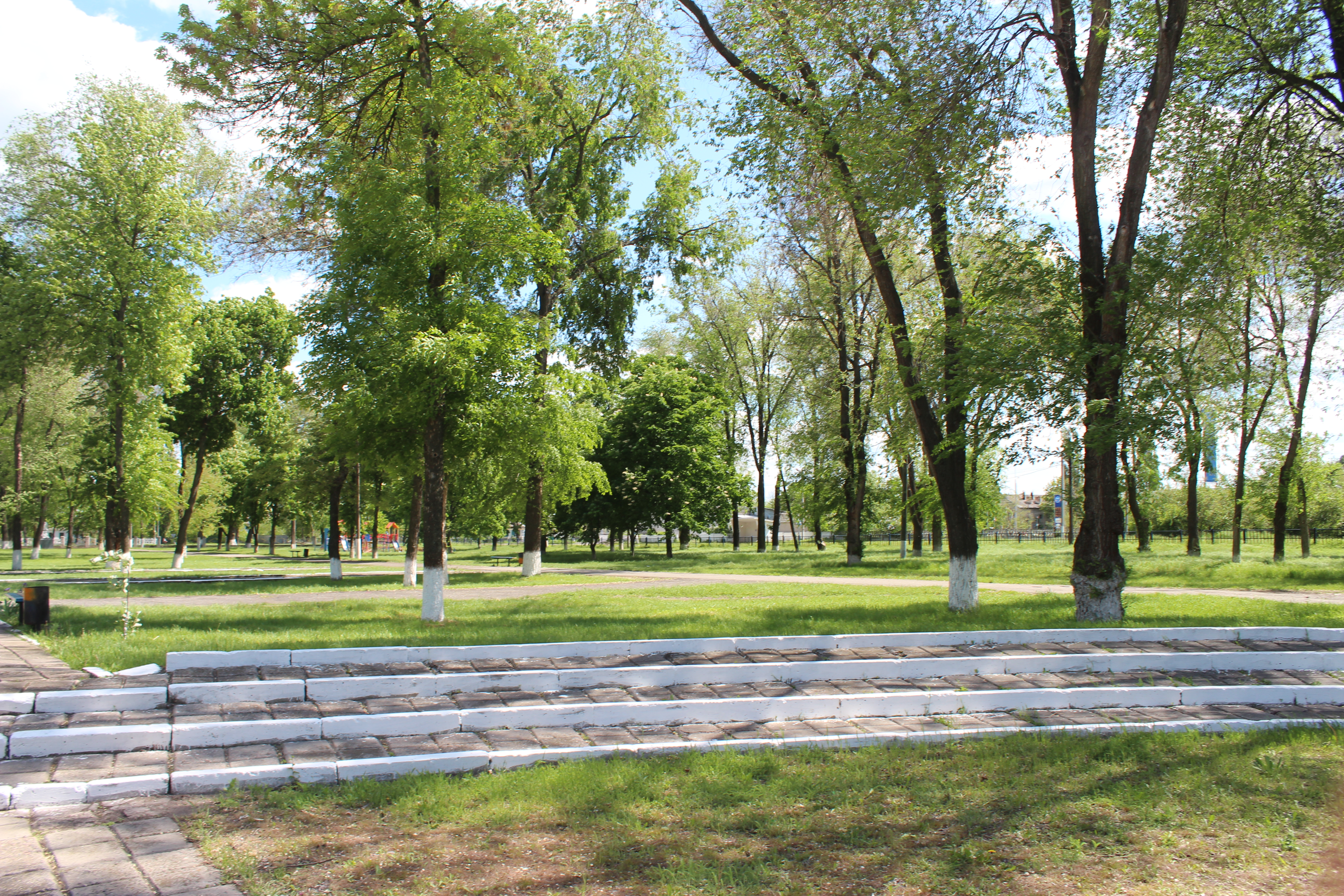
Shevchenko Park in Pereshchepyne
