= Petrykivka =

Rural locality in Dnipropetrovsk Oblast, Ukraine

Petrykivka Петриківка
- Rural settlement
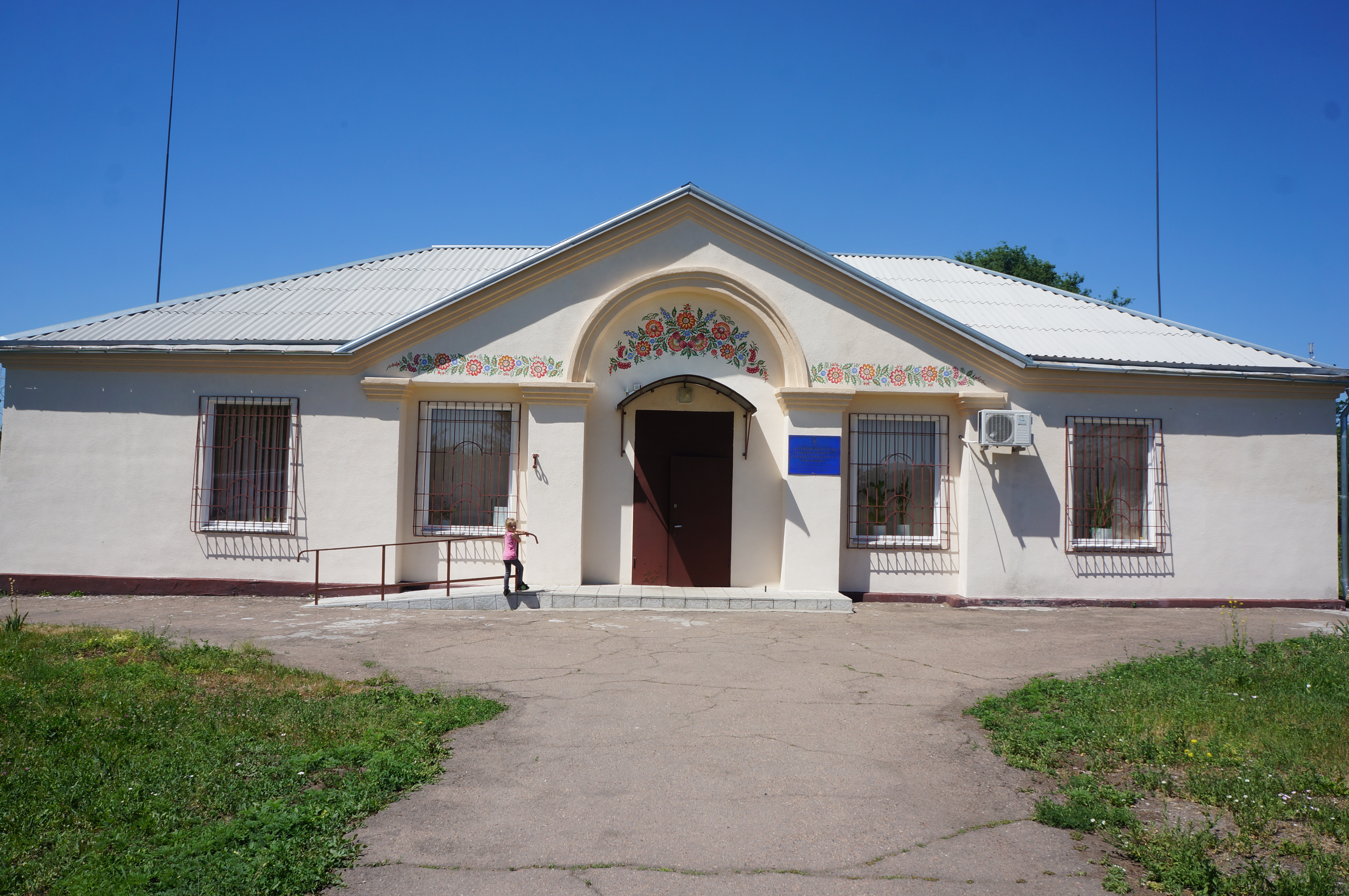
- Folk art museum in Petrykivka

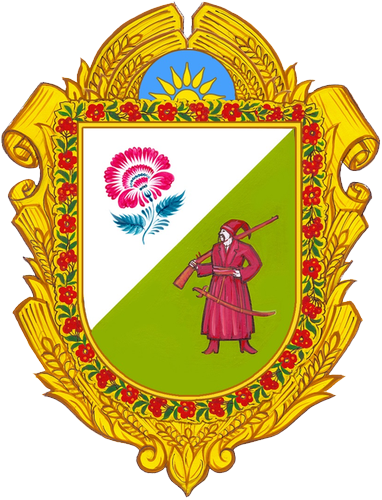
- Seal

- Location within Ukraine Location within Dnipropetrovsk Oblast
- Coordinates: 48°43′00″N 34°37′43″E
- Country: Ukraine
- Oblast: Dnipropetrovsk Oblast
- Raion: Dnipro Raion
- First mention: 1772

Area
  - Total: 14.816 km^{2} (5.720 sq mi)

Population (2022)
  - Total: 4,446
  - Density: 300.1/km^{2} (777.2/sq mi)
- Time zone: UTC+2 (EET)
  - Summer (DST): UTC+3 (EEST)

Petrykivka (Ukrainian: Петриківка) is a rural settlement in Dnipro Raion, Dnipropetrovsk Oblast, east-central Ukraine. It hosts the administration of Petrykivka settlement hromada, one of the hromadas of Ukraine. Population: 4,446 (2022 estimate).

Petrykivka is famous as a folk art centre and for its unique style of decorative painting, which is inscribed by UNESCO as significant Intangible Cultural Heritage of Ukraine.

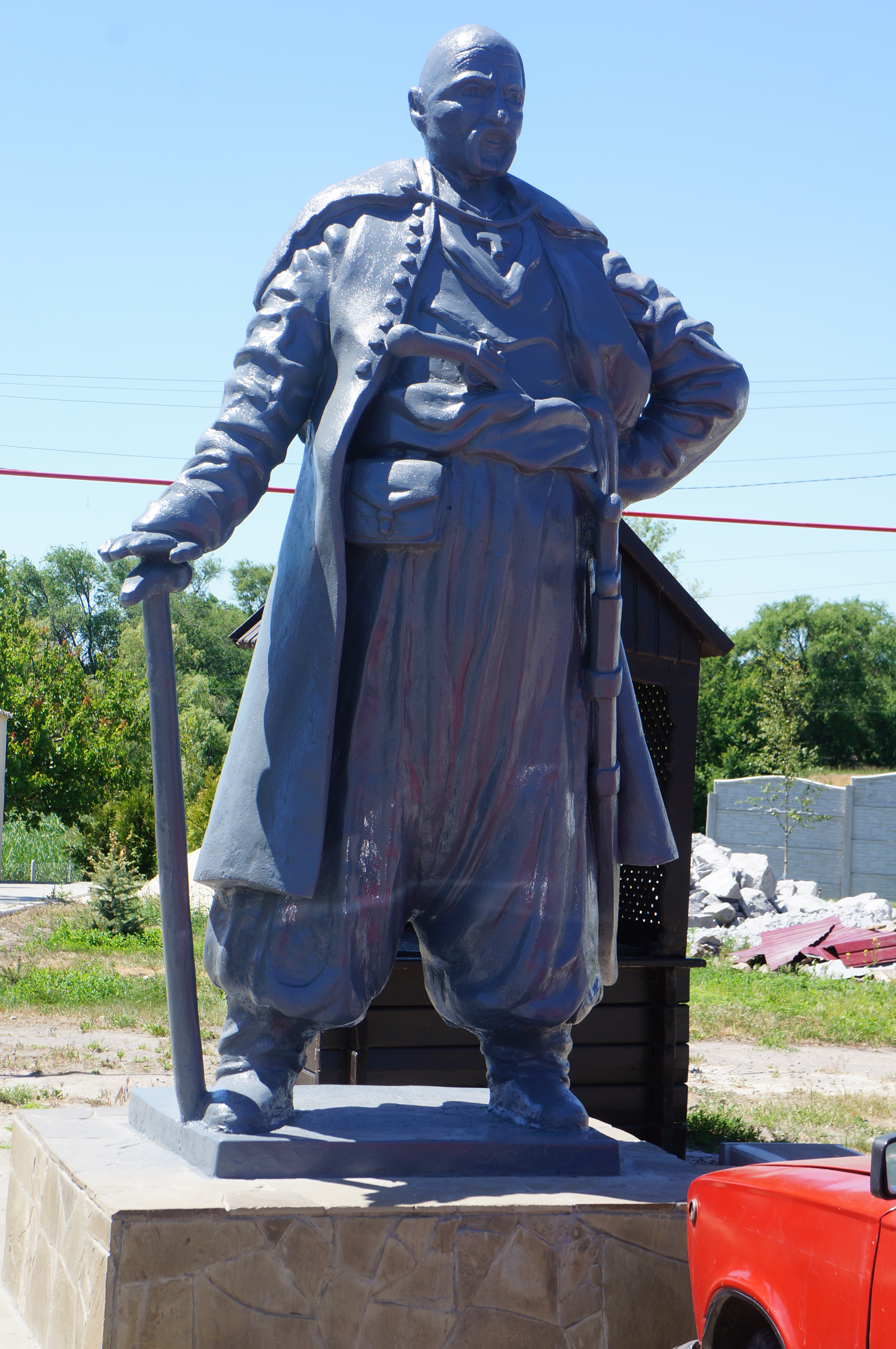
Petro Kalnyshevskyi monument in Petrykivka

== History ==
According to a legend, the settlement was founded by the Cossack Petryk, who gathered under his protection the serfs from the local villages.

Petrykivka was first mentioned in historical documents in 1772, when the residents of neighbouring Kurylivka village asked Kosh Otaman Petro Kalnyshevsky to move their Orthodox Chapel to a safer place because of flooding. According to that request, the wooden church was moved to Petrykivka.

During World War II the town was conquered by Italian troops.

Until the raion was abolished on 18 July 2020, Petrykivka was the administrative center of Petrykivka Raion. After that date the village became part of Dnipro Raion.

Until 26 January 2024, Petrykivka was designated urban-type settlement. On this day, a new law entered into force which abolished this status, and Petrykivka became a rural settlement.
