= Samar Raion =

Subdivision of Dnipropetrovsk Oblast, Ukraine

- Raion
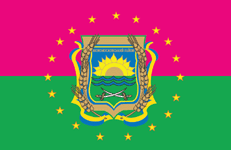
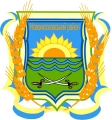
- Flag Coat of arms

- Coordinates: 48°36′41.8″N 35°8′9.3″E
- Country: Ukraine
- Oblast: Dnipropetrovsk Oblast
- Admin. center: Samar
- Subdivisions: 8 hromadas

Area
  - Total: 3,482.9 km^{2} (1,344.8 sq mi)

Population (2022)
  - Total: 167,526
  - Density: 48.100/km^{2} (124.58/sq mi)
- Time zone: UTC+02:00 (EET)
  - Summer (DST): UTC+03:00 (EEST)
- Area code: +380

Samar Raion (Ukrainian: Самарівський район), until 2024 known as Novomoskovsk Raion (Ukrainian: Новомосковський район), is a raion (district) of Dnipropetrovsk Oblast, southeastern-central Ukraine. Its administrative centre is located at Samar. Population: 167,526 (2022 estimate).

On 18 July 2020, as part of the administrative reform of Ukraine, the number of raions of Dnipropetrovsk Oblast was reduced to seven, and the area of Novomoskovsk Raion was significantly expanded. One abolished raion, Mahdalynivka Raion, as well as the city of Novomoskovsk (which was previously incorporated as a city of oblast significance and did not belong to the raion), were merged into Novomoskovsk Raion. The January 2020 estimate of the raion population was 71,613 (2020 est.).

On 19 September 2024, the Verkhovna Rada voted to rename Novomoskovsk Raion to Samar Raion.

== Subdivisions ==
=== Current ===
After the reform in July 2020, the raion consisted of eight hromadas:

- Cherkaske settlement hromada with the administration in the rural settlement of Cherkaske, retained from Novomoskovsk Raion;
- Chernechchina rural hromada with the administration in the selo of Chernechchina, transferred from Mahdalynivka Raion;
- Hubynykha settlement hromada with the administration in the rural settlement of Hubynykha, retained from Novomoskovsk Raion;
- Lychkove rural hromada with the administration in the selo of Lychkove, transferred from Mahdalynivka Raion;
- Mahdalynivka settlement hromada with the administration in the rural settlement of Mahdalynivka, transferred from Mahdalynivka Raion.
- Pereshchepyne urban hromada with the administration in the city of Pereshchepyne, retained from Novomoskovsk Raion;
- Pishchanka rural hromada with the administration in the selo of Pishchanka, retained from Novomoskovsk Raion.
- Samar urban hromada with the administration in the city of Samar, transferred from the city of oblast significance of Novomoskovsk;

=== Before 2020 ===
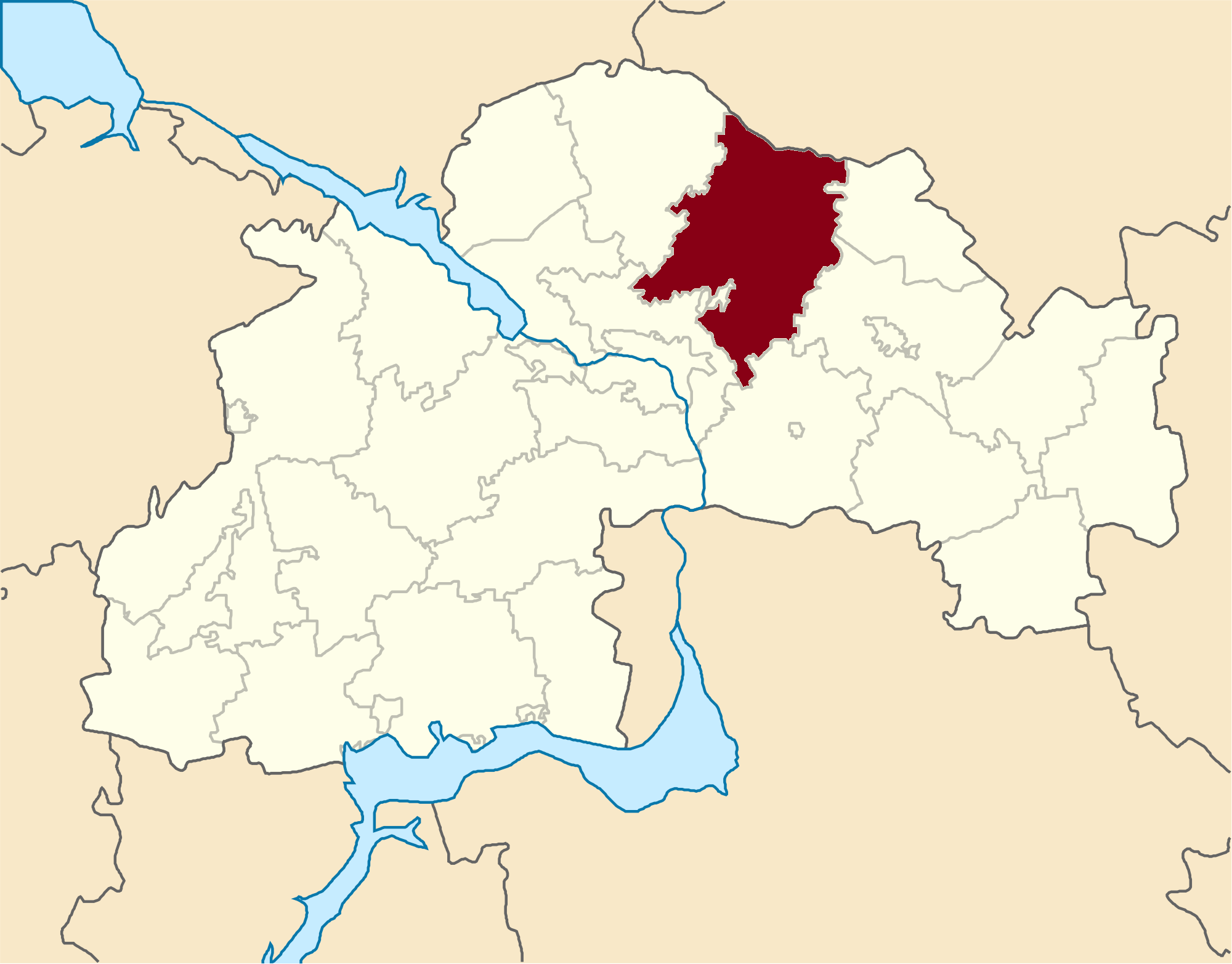
Novomoskovsk Raion in Dnipropetrovsk Oblast before 2020

Before the 2020 reform, the raion consisted of four hromadas:

- Cherkaske settlement hromada with the administration in Cherkaske;
- Hubynykha settlement hromada with the administration in Hubynykha;
- Pereshchepyne urban hromada with the administration in Pereshchepyne;
- Pishchanka rural hromada with the administration in Pishchanka.
