= Petrykivka Raion =

Former subdivision of Dnipropetrovsk Oblast, Ukraine

Petrykivka Raion Петриківський район
- Raion
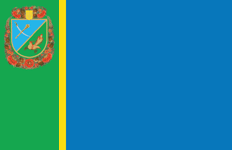
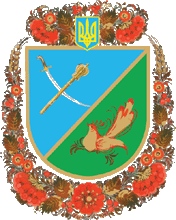
- Flag Coat of arms

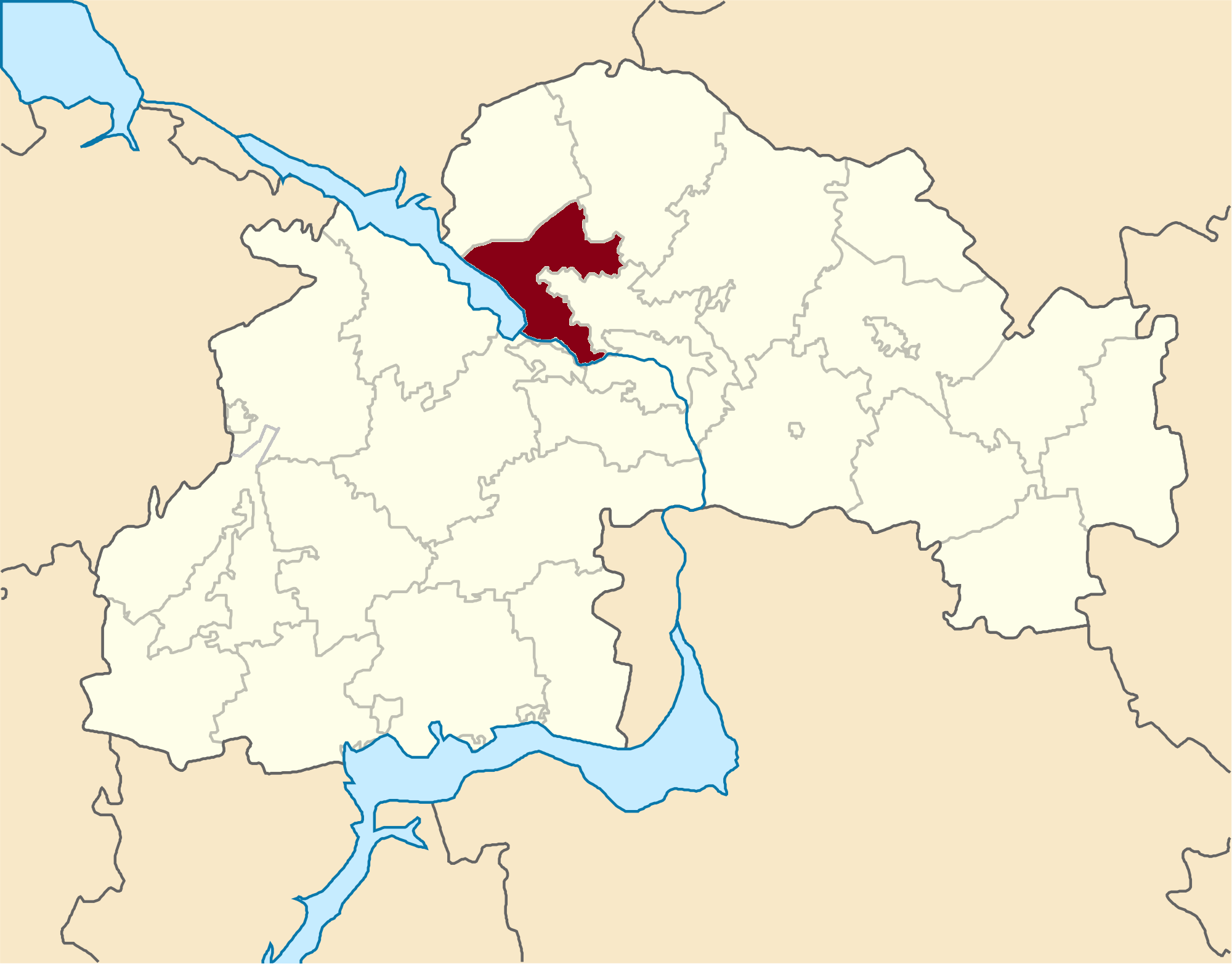
- Coordinates: 48°43′N 34°38′E
- Country: Ukraine
- Region: Dnipropetrovsk Oblast
- Disestablished: 18 July 2020
- Admin. center: Petrykivka
- Subdivisions: List: — city councils; — settlement councils; — rural councils; Number of localities: — cities; — urban-type settlements; — villages; — rural settlements

Area
  - Total: 928 km^{2} (358 sq mi)

Population (2020)
  - Total: 24,479
  - Density: 26.4/km^{2} (68.3/sq mi)
- Time zone: UTC+02:00 (EET)
  - Summer (DST): UTC+03:00 (EEST)
- Area code: +380

Petrykivka Raion (Ukrainian: Петриківський район) was a raion (district) of Dnipropetrovsk Oblast, southeastern-central Ukraine. Its administrative center was the urban-type settlement of Petrykivka. The raion was abolished on 18 July 2020 as part of the administrative reform of Ukraine, which reduced the number of raions of Dnipropetrovsk Oblast to seven. The area of Petrykivka Raion was merged into Dnipro Raion. The last estimate of the raion population was 24,479 (2020 est.).

The raion contains Dniprovsko-Orilskyi Nature Reserve.

At the time of disestablishment, the raion consisted of one hromada, Petrykivka settlement hromada with the administration in Petrykivka.
