= Synelnykove =

City in Dnipropetrovsk Oblast, Ukraine

Synelnykove Синельникове
- City
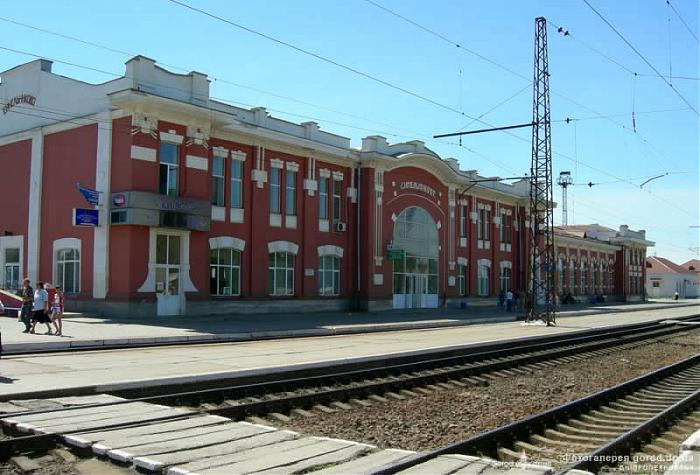
- Synelnykove 1st railway station

- Flag Coat of arms
- Interactive map of Synelnykove
- Location in Ukraine Synelnykove (Dnipropetrovsk Oblast)
- Coordinates: 48°19′4″N 35°30′43″E
- Country: Ukraine
- Oblast: Dnipropetrovsk Oblast
- Raion: Synelnykove Raion
- Hromada: Synelnykove urban hromada
- Founded: 1868
- City status: 1932

Government
  - Mayor: Dmytro Zrazhevskyi

Area
  - Total: 23 km^{2} (8.9 sq mi)

Population (2022)
  - Total: 29,651
  - Density: 1,300/km^{2} (3,300/sq mi)
- Time zone: UTC+2 (EET)
  - Summer (DST): UTC+3 (EEST)
- Postal code: 52500—52507

Synelnykove (Ukrainian: Синельникове, pronounced [sɪˈnɛlʲnɪkowe]) is a city and municipality in Dnipropetrovsk Oblast, in eastern Ukraine. It is the largest city in the south-eastern part of the region. It serves as the administrative center of Synelnykove Raion within the oblast. Population: 28,651 (2022 estimate).

== History ==
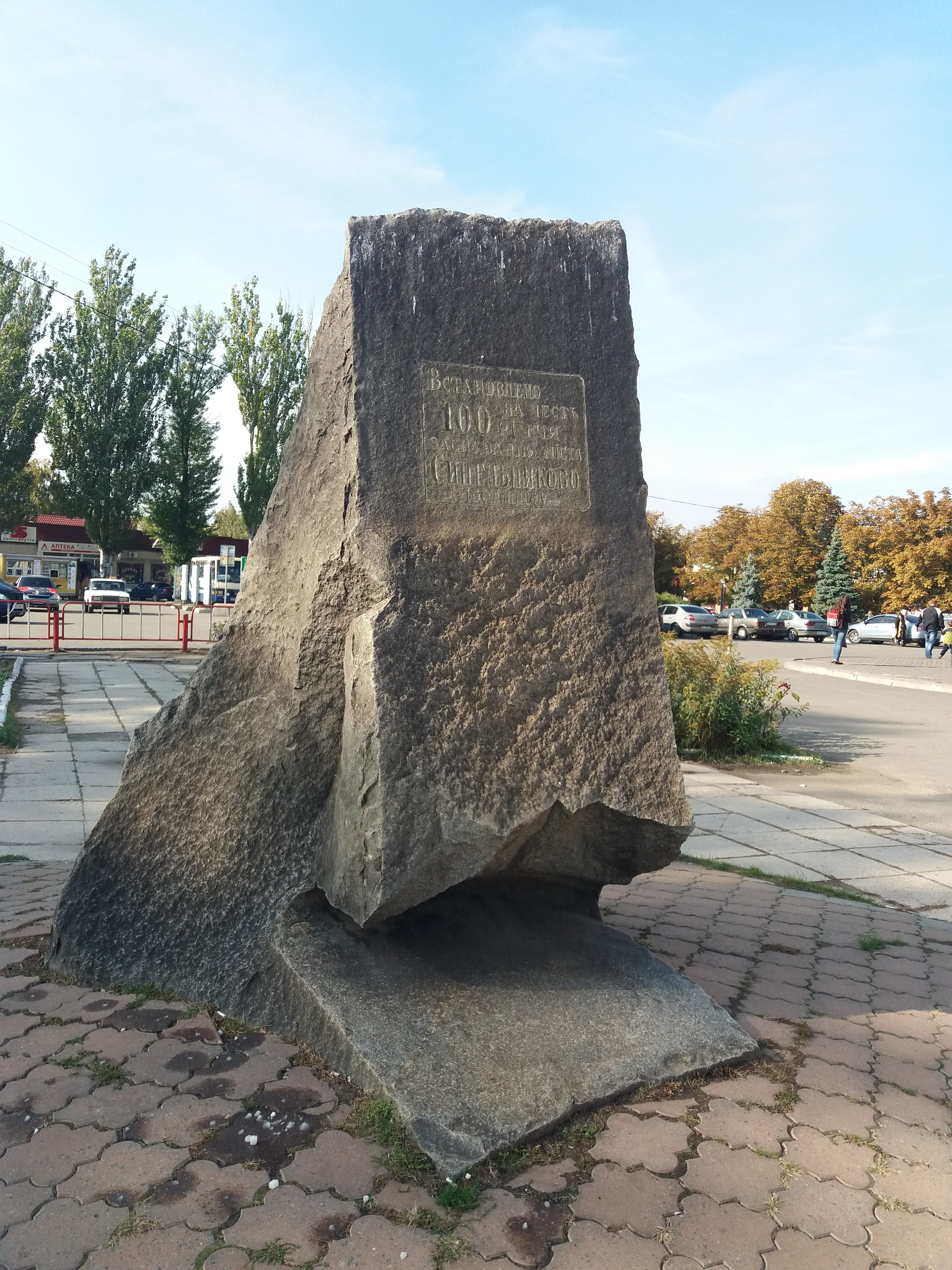
Memorial marking the centenary of the town's foundation

It was created as a settlement in Yekaterinoslav Governorate in the 19th century on a private territory that was given as a gift to the Russian governor Ivan Sinelnikov by the Russian Imperial government. August 1868 is considered to be the official date of establishment, Synelnykove was then nothing more than a train station. It was named in honor of the noble Synelnikov family, who owned these lands until the end of the 18th century. In 1896, the train station was connected to the Kursk–Kharkiv–Sevastopol railways and was officially opened on 15 November 1873. With the development of the railway Synelnykove became an important transport hub. Industry and trade began to develop in the city. In 1917, Synelnykove became a district center of the Yekaterinoslav Governorate.

During the Ukrainian War of Independence, from 1917 to 1920, it passed between various factions. Afterwards it was administratively part of the Katerynoslav Governorate of Ukraine.

In 1932, it received the status of a city.

During World War II, since October 1941 until September 1943 it was occupied by German troops.

Since 1979 and until 18 July 2020, Synelnykove was incorporated as a city of oblast significance and served as the administrative center of Synelnykove Raion though it did not belong to the raion. In July 2020, as part of the administrative reform of Ukraine, which reduced the number of raions of Dnipropetrovsk Oblast to seven, the city of Synelnykove was merged into Synelnykove Raion.

Due to the law "On the Condemnation and Prohibition of Propaganda of Russian Imperial Policy in Ukraine and the Decolonization of Toponymy" (in April 2023 signed by President Volodymyr Zelenskyy) the city needs to be renamed. According to law this renaming has to take place before 27 January 2024. On 1 January 2024, five (new) name options were offered to a public discussions would last until 20 January 2024.

On 20 March 2024, the Verkhovna Rada Committee on the organization of state power, Local Self-Government, Regional Development and urban planning decided to propose the name Ridnopillia. On 9 October 2024, the proposed name Ridnopillia did not get enough votes in the Verkhovna Rada.

== Population ==
In January 1989, the population was 37 807 people

According to the 2001 Ukrainian census, the city's population was 32,302. Ukrainians accounted for 84.5% of the population and Russians for 12.5%. Ukrainian was the native language for 78% of the population, and Russian for 20.2%.

In January 2013, the population was 31 568 people. At the end of 2024, the population was 27,259 people.

== Gallery ==
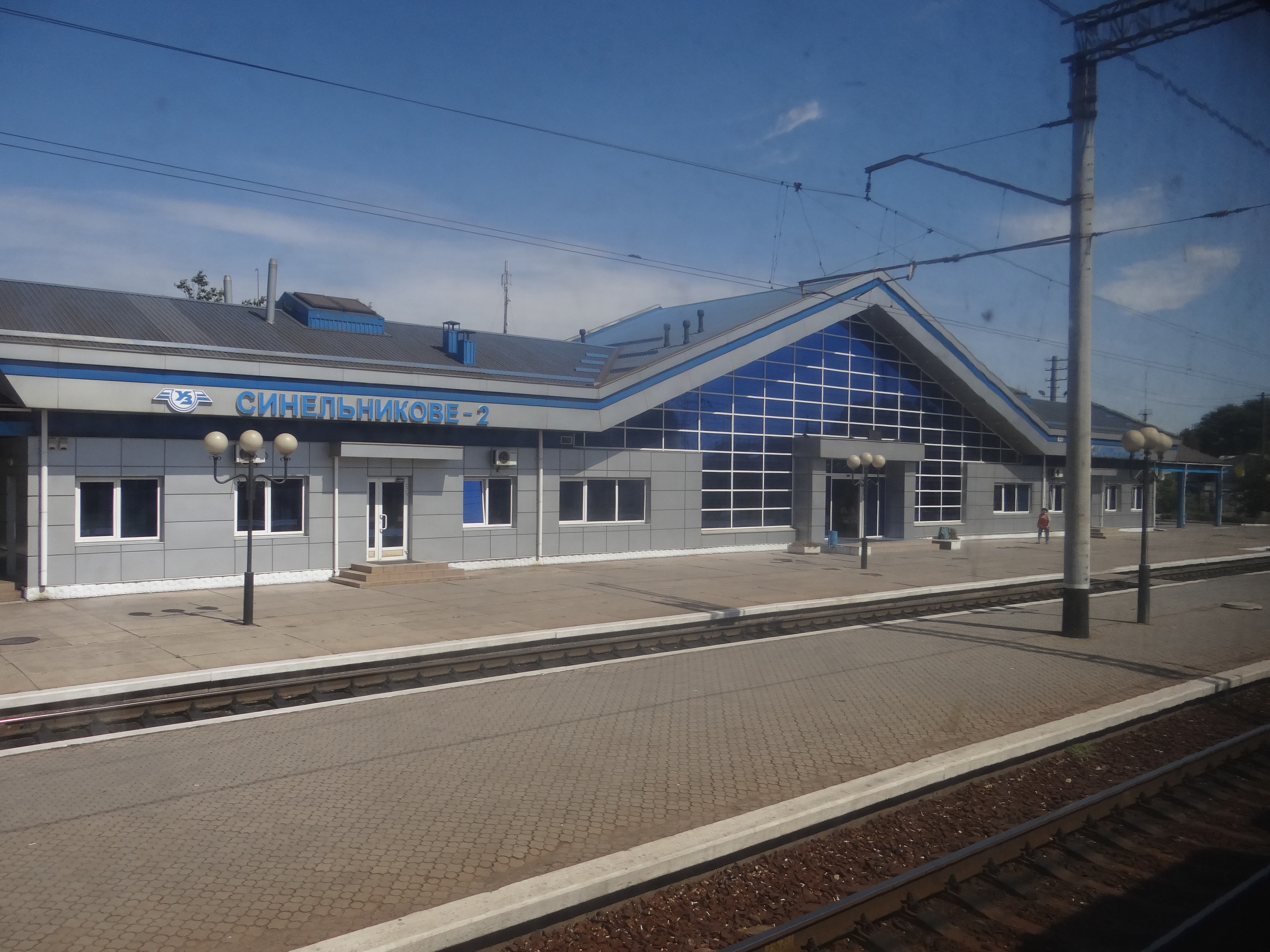
Synelnykove 2nd railway station

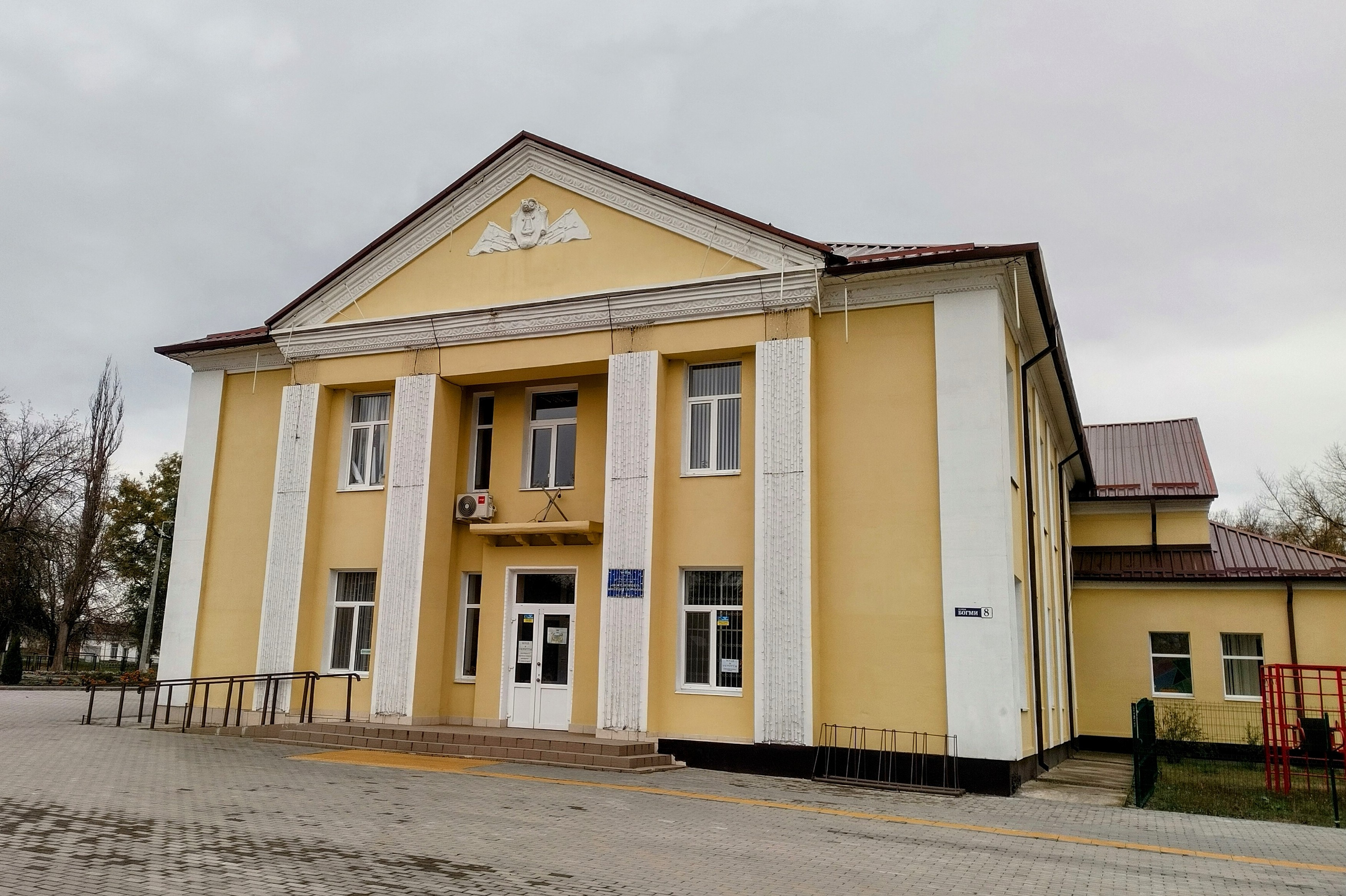
Children's and Youth Creativity Center

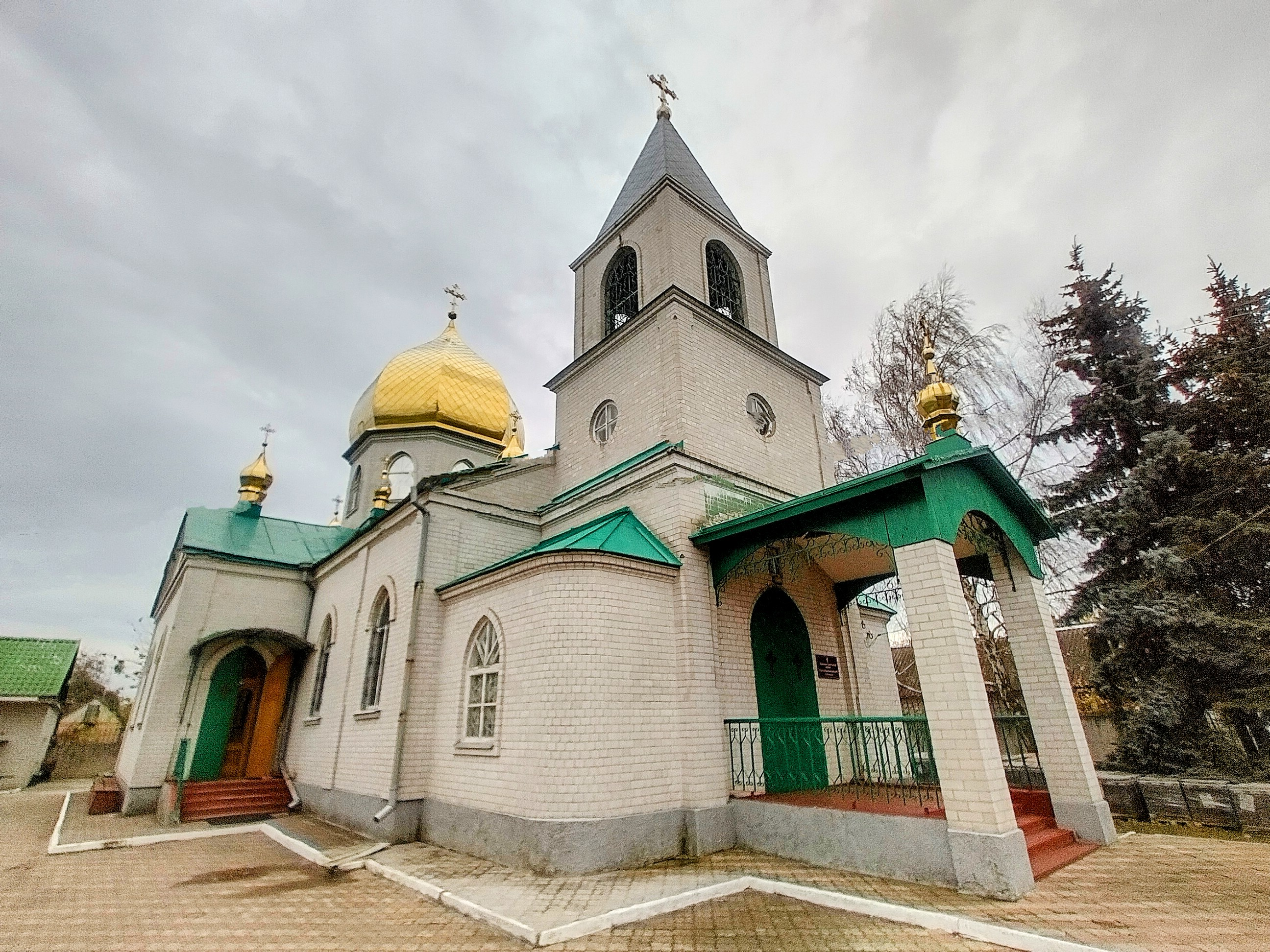
Saint Nicholas Church
