= Dniprovske, Dnipropetrovsk Oblast =

Rural locality in Dnipropetrovsk Oblast, Ukraine

Dniprovske Дніпровське
- Rural settlement
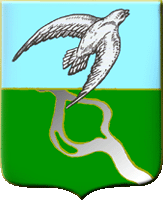
- Coat of arms

- Location within Ukraine Location within Dnipropetrovsk Oblast
- Coordinates: 48°35′38″N 34°25′17″E
- Country: Ukraine
- Oblast: Dnipropetrovsk Oblast
- Raion: Kamianske Raion

Population (2022)
  - Total: 5,324
- Time zone: UTC+2 (EET)
  - Summer (DST): UTC+3 (EEST)

Dniprovske (Ukrainian: Дніпровське; Russian: Днепровское) is a rural settlement in Kamianske Raion, Dnipropetrovsk Oblast, Ukraine. Dniprovske is located on the right bank of the Dnieper (the Kamianske Reservoir), between Kamianske and Verkhnodniprovsk. It belongs to Verkhnodniprovsk urban hromada, one of the hromadas of Ukraine. Population: 5,324 (2022 estimate).

== History ==
Until 18 July 2020, Dniprovske belonged to Verkhnodniprovsk Raion. The raion was abolished in July 2020 as part of the administrative reform of Ukraine, which reduced the number of raions of Dnipropetrovsk Oblast to seven. The area of Verkhnodniprovsk Raion was merged into Kamianske Raion.

Until 26 January 2024, Dniprovske was designated urban-type settlement. On this day, a new law entered into force which abolished this status, and Dniprovske became a rural settlement.

== Economy ==
=== Transportation ===
The closest railway station, Verkhnodniprovsk, is located in Novomykolaivka. It is on the railway connecting Kamianske and Kryvyi Rih.

Dniprovske has access to Highway H08 which connects Kamianske and Kremenchuk.
