= Mokra Sura =

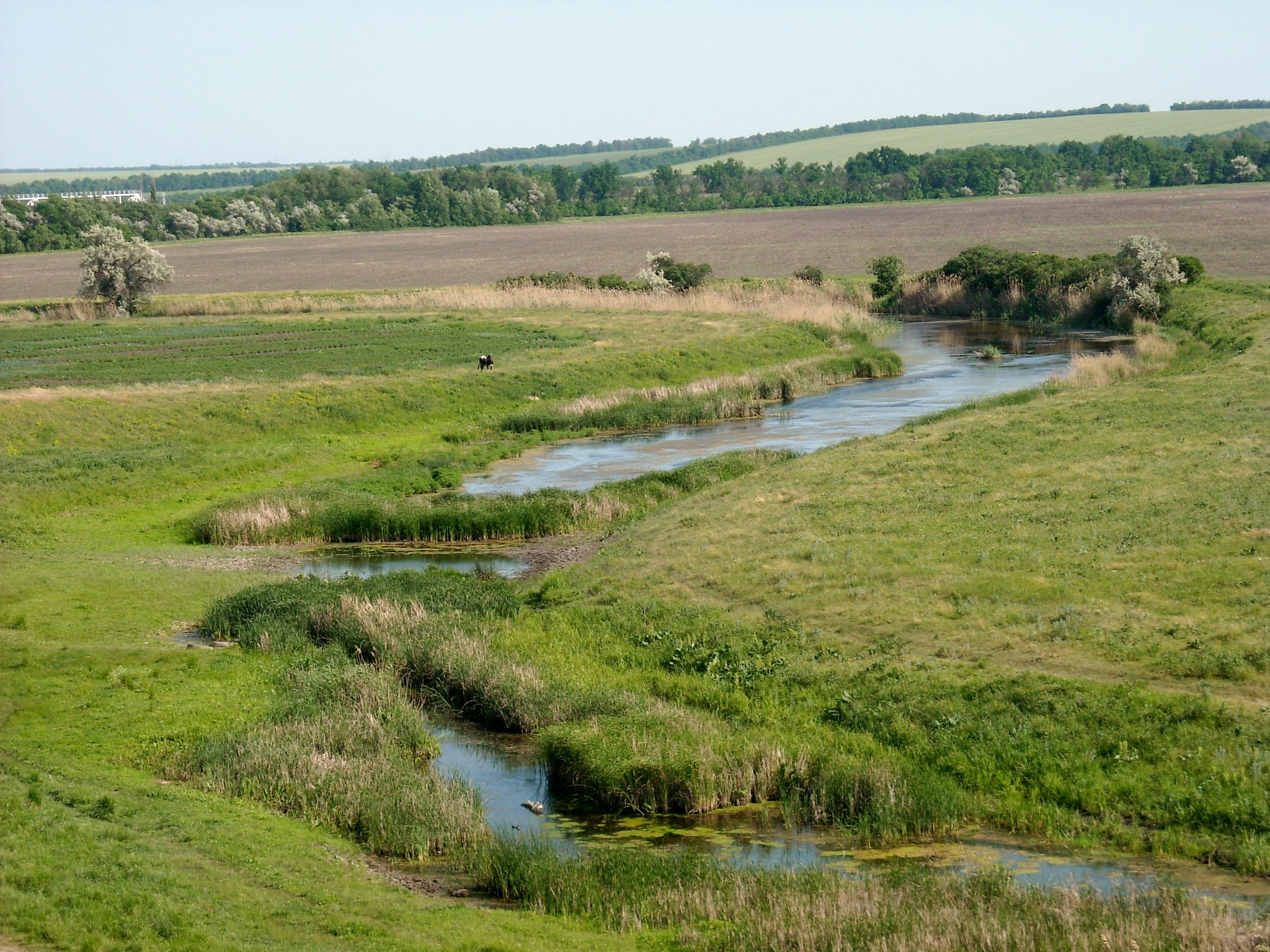
- Mokra Sura near the settlement of Nadiivka

Location
- Country: Ukraine
- Region: Dnipropetrovsk Oblast

Physical characteristics
- Source: near the southern outskirts of the city of Verkhivtseve
- Mouth: Dnieper Reservoir
  - coordinates: 48°19′27″N 35°08′33″E
- Length: 138 km (86 mi)
- Basin size: 2,830 km^{2} (1,090 sq mi)

Basin features
- Tributaries
  - left: Sukha Sura (mala), Sukha Sura
  - right: Hrushivka, Komyshuvata Sura, Trytuzna

Mokra Sura (Ukrainian: Мокра Сура, romanized: Mokra Sura) is a river in Ukraine, within Kamianske and Dnipro Raions of Dnipropetrovsk Oblast. It is a right tributary of the Dnieper (Black Sea basin).

== Description ==
Length – 138 kilometres (86 mi), basin area – 2,830 square kilometres (1,090 sq mi). The valley is trapezoidal, with slopes dissected by ravines and gullies. Valley width up to 4–4.5 km. The floodplain is wide (up to 1.5–2 km), covered mostly with meadow vegetation. The riverbed is very winding, 20–30 m wide and more (on reaches). The river slope is 0.66 m/km. Many ponds have been built.

== Location ==
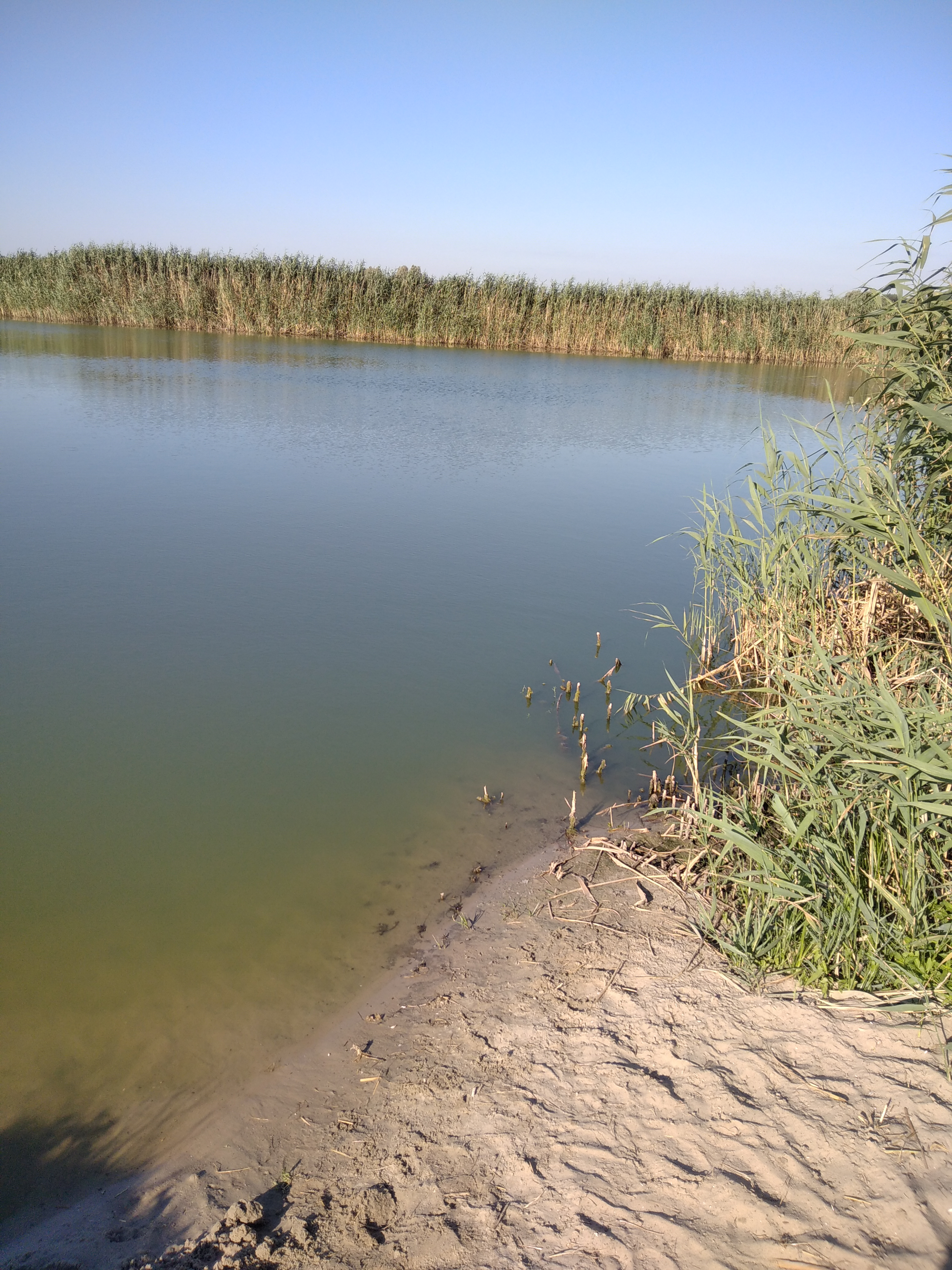
Mokra Sura River, Ukraine

The source is located near the southern outskirts of the city of Verkhivtseve. At first it flows east and (partly) northeast, then turns south. In the middle course it flows southeast and northeast, in the lower – mainly east. It flows into the Dnieper Reservoir near the northern part of Voloske. Before the construction of the DniproHES, there was the Sur Rapids near the mouth.

The river receives 95 small rivers and streams (including 80 less than 10 km long). The total length of Sura's tributaries is 552 km (including streams less than 10 km – 226 km). The river network density is 0.24 km of rivers per km² of basin area.

== Name ==
Local residents call "Mokra Sura" only the parts of the river where it flows in a meadow and has a depth of up to 30 cm. Where the river is deep and the water surface is visible, the river is simply called "Sura". However, the name "Mokra Sura" was officially established (possibly to distinguish it from the right Volga tributary – the Sura).

There are several versions of the origin of the name. The main one – Sura comes from the Iranian sura, meaning "wet", and then the name Mokra Sura sounds tautological.

== Tributaries ==
Right: Balka Shyroka, Balka Ternovata, Hrushivka, Komyshuvata Sura (left tributary of Liubymivka), Solona, Trytuzna (right tributary of Sukha Sura (Trytuzna)).

Left: Balka Shyroka (v. Shyroke), Balka Kamianuvata, Sukha Sura (mala), Sukha Sura (left tributary of Sukhachivka), Balka Kislytska, Voitsekhova Balka, Balka Chaplyna.

== Populated places ==
It flows south of the city of Dnipro.

Large urban-type settlements and villages on the Mokra Sura: Verkhivtseve (near the source), Krynychky, Pryvilne, Apollonivka, Novomykolaivka, Sursko-Lytovske, Novooleksandrivka.

Large urban-type settlements and villages on the Komyshuvata Sura: Chumaky, Novopokrovka.

Large villages on the Sukha Sura: Stepove, Mykolaivka, Sursko-Mykhailivka.
