= Karnaukhivka =

Rural locality in Dnipropetrovsk Oblast, Ukraine

Karnaukhivka Карнаухівка
- Rural settlement
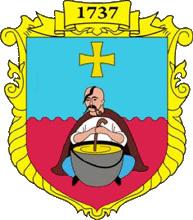
- Coat of arms

- Location within Ukraine Location within Dnipropetrovsk Oblast
- Coordinates: 48°28′17″N 34°44′13″E
- Country: Ukraine
- Oblast: Dnipropetrovsk Oblast
- Raion: Kamianske Raion

Population (2022)
  - Total: 6,600
- Time zone: UTC+2 (EET)
  - Summer (DST): UTC+3 (EEST)

Karnaukhivka (Ukrainian: Карнаухівка; Russian: Карнауховка) is a rural settlement in Kamianske Raion, Dnipropetrovsk Oblast, Ukraine. It is located on the right bank of the Dnieper, about 5 kilometres (3.1 mi) southeast of Kamianske. Karnaukhivka belongs to Kamianske urban hromada, one of the hromadas of Ukraine. Population: 6,600 (2022 estimate).

== History ==
Until 18 July 2020, Karnaukhivka belonged to Kamianske municipality, the administrative division subordinated to the city of oblast significance of Kamianske. The municipality was abolished in July 2020 as part of the administrative reform of Ukraine, which reduced the number of raions of Dnipropetrovsk Oblast to seven. The area of Kamianske Municipality was merged into the newly established Kamianske Raion.

Until 26 January 2024, Karnaukhivka was designated urban-type settlement. On this day, a new law entered into force which abolished this status, and Karnaukhivka became a rural settlement.

== Economy ==
=== Transportation ===
The railway which connects Dnipro and Kamianske with further connections to Kryvyi Rih crosses Karnaukhivka. There are two railway stops on this railway within Karnaukhivka, 164 km and 165 km. Another railway runs from Dnipro to the center of Kamianske, but it does not have passenger service.

Karnaukhivka has a network of paved roads which connect it with both Dnipro and Kamianske.
