= Bozhedarivka =

Rural locality in Dnipropetrovsk Oblast, Ukraine

Bozhedarivka Божедарівка
- Rural settlement
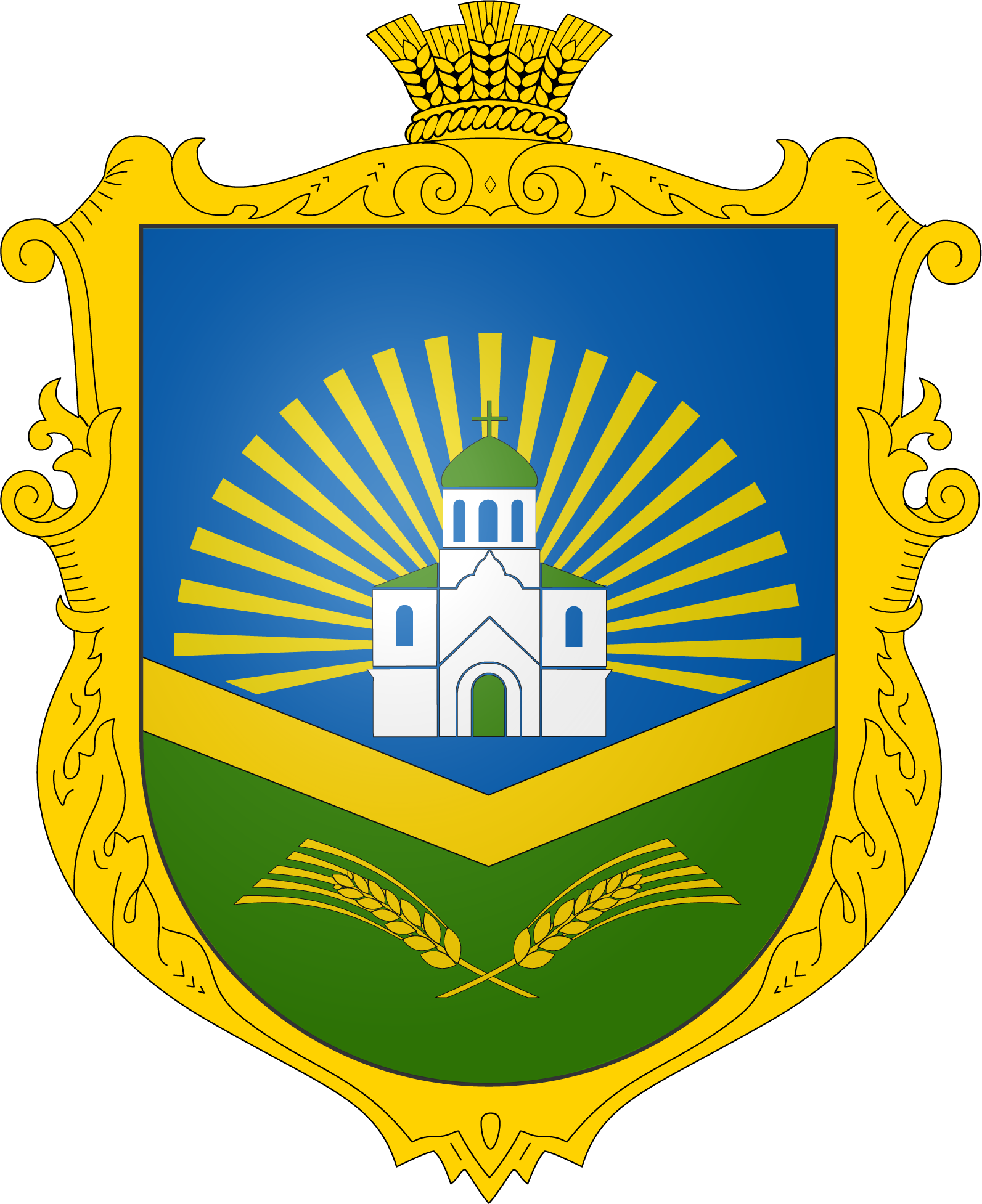
- Seal

- Location in Dnipropetrovsk Oblast Location in Ukraine
- Coordinates: 48°21′13″N 34°06′47″E
- Country: Ukraine
- Oblast: Dnipropetrovsk Oblast
- Raion: Kamianske Raion

Population (2022)
  - Total: 2,651
- Time zone: UTC+2 (EET)
  - Summer (DST): UTC+3 (EEST)

Bozhedarivka (Ukrainian: Божедарівка; Russian: Божедаровка) is a rural settlement in Kamianske Raion, Dnipropetrovsk Oblast, Ukraine. It is located approximately 50 kilometres (31 mi) west of Dnipro. From 1939 until February 2016 it was known as Shchorsk, in honor of Red Army commander Nikolay Shchors, but was renamed to comply with the Ukraine's law prohibiting names of Communist origin. Bozhedarivka hosts the administration of Bozhedarivka settlement hromada, one of the hromadas of Ukraine. Population: 2,651 (2022 estimate).

== History ==
Until 18 July 2020, Bozhedarivka belonged to Krynychky Raion. The raion was abolished in July 2020 as part of the administrative reform of Ukraine, which reduced the number of raions of Dnipropetrovsk Oblast to seven. The area of Krynychky Raion was merged into Kamianske Raion.

Until 26 January 2024, Bozhedarivka was designated urban-type settlement. On this day, a new law entered into force which abolished this status, and Bozhedarivka became a rural settlement.

== Economy ==
=== Transportation ===
Bozhedarivka railway station is on the railroad connecting Verkhivtseve with Kryvyi Rih. There is regular passenger traffic.

The settlement is on Highway M04 which connects Dnipro and Znamianka with further access to Kropyvnytskyi.
