= Novomykolaivka, Dnipropetrovsk Oblast =

Rural locality in Dnipropetrovsk Oblast, Ukraine

Novomykolaivka Новомиколаївка
- Rural settlement
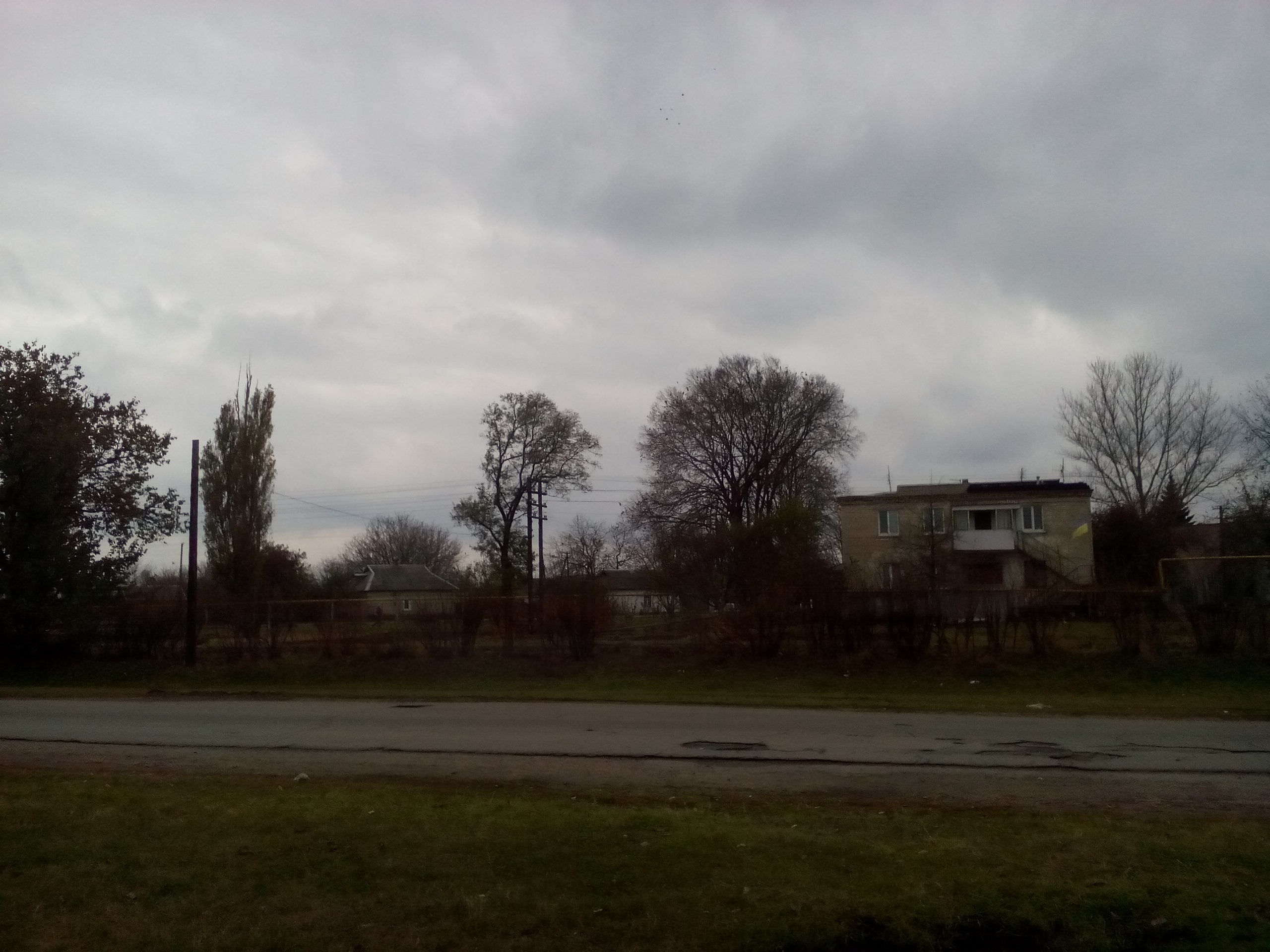

- Location within Dnipropetrovsk Oblast Location within Ukraine
- Coordinates: 48°33′10″N 34°22′35″E
- Country: Ukraine
- Oblast: Dnipropetrovsk Oblast
- Raion: Kamianske Raion

Population (2022)
  - Total: 3,830
- Time zone: UTC+2 (EET)
  - Summer (DST): UTC+3 (EEST)

Novomykolaivka (Ukrainian: Новомиколаївка; Russian: Новониколаевка) is a rural settlement in Kamianske Raion of Dnipropetrovsk Oblast in Ukraine. The settlement is located west of the city of Kamianske and south of the Kamianske Reservoir. It belongs to Verkhnodniprovsk urban hromada, one of the hromadas of Ukraine. Population: 3,830 (2022 estimate).

== History ==
During World War II this village was under German occupation from 1941 to 1943.

It acquired the status of an urban-type settlement in 1966. A poultry farm was here.

In 1985 a new department store was built here.

In January 1989 the population was 4142 people.

In January 2013 the population was 4187 people.

Until 18 July 2020, Novomykolaivka belonged to Verkhnodniprovsk Raion. The raion was abolished in July 2020 as part of the administrative reform of Ukraine, which reduced the number of raions of Dnipropetrovsk Oblast to seven. The area of Verkhnodniprovsk Raion was merged into Kamianske Raion.

Until 26 January 2024, Novomykolaivka was designated urban-type settlement. On this day, a new law entered into force which abolished this status, and Novomykolaivka became a rural settlement.

== Demographics ==
As of the 2001 Ukrainian census, Novomykolaivka had a population of 3,985 inhabitants. The linguistic composition of the population at the time of the census was as follows:

Languages in Novomykolaivka
	percent
Ukrainian	90.1%
Russian	7.2%
Romani	1.4%
Romanian	0.9%
Belarusian	0.2%
Hungarian	0.1%
others	0.1%

== Economy ==
=== Transportation ===
Verkhnodniprovsk railway station is located in Novomykolaivka. It is on the railway connecting Kamianske and Kryvyi Rih.

Novomykolaivka is on Highway H08 which connects Kamianske and Kremenchuk. Another paved road runs to Verkhivtseve.
