= Piatykhatky Raion =

Former subdivision of Dnipropetrovsk Oblast, Ukraine

Piatykhatky Raion П'ятихатський район
- Raion
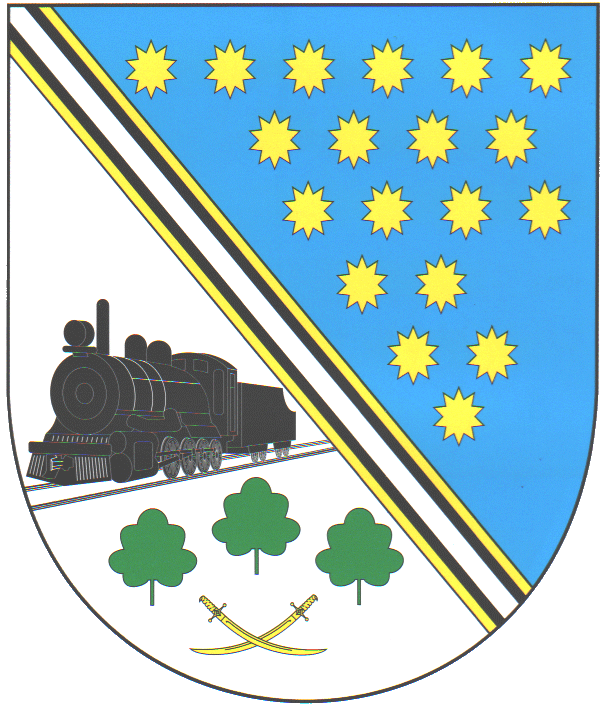
- Flag Coat of arms

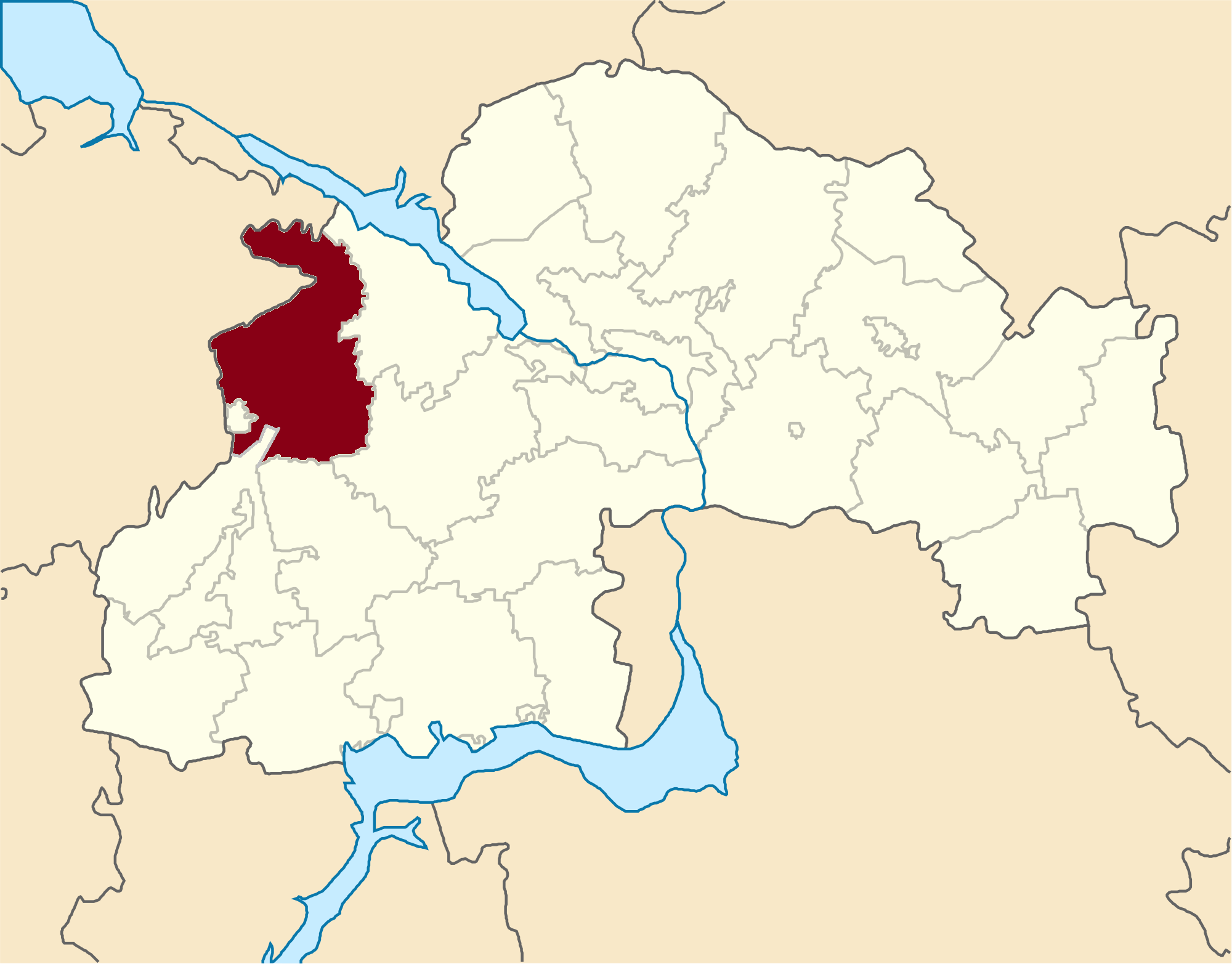
- Coordinates: 48°25′N 33°43′E
- Country: Ukraine
- Region: Dnipropetrovsk Oblast
- Disestablished: 18 July 2020
- Admin. center: Piatykhatky
- Subdivisions: List: — city councils; — settlement councils; — rural councils; Number of localities: — cities; — urban-type settlements; — villages; — rural settlements

Area
  - Total: 1,683 km^{2} (650 sq mi)

Population (2020)
  - Total: 43,469
  - Density: 25.83/km^{2} (66.89/sq mi)
- Time zone: UTC+02:00 (EET)
  - Summer (DST): UTC+03:00 (EEST)
- Area code: +380
- Website: http://www.pyatih-rn.dp.gov.ua/

Piatykhatky Raion (Ukrainian: П'ятихатський район), unofficially Piatykhatshchyna (Ukrainian: П'ятиха́тщина), was a raion (district) of Dnipropetrovsk Oblast, southeastern-central Ukraine. Its administrative centre was located at the city of Piatykhatky. The raion was abolished on 18 July 2020 as part of the administrative reform of Ukraine, which reduced the number of raions of Dnipropetrovsk Oblast to seven. The area of Piatykhatky Raion was merged into Kamianske Raion. The last estimate of the raion population was 43,469 (2020 est.).

At the time of disestablishment, the raion consisted of four hromadas:

- Lykhivka settlement hromada with the administration in the urban-type settlement of Lykhivka;
- Piatykhatky urban hromada with the administration in Piatykhatky;
- Saksahan rural hromada with the administration in the selo of Saksahan;
- Vyshneve settlement hromada with the administration in the urban-type settlement of Vyshneve.
