= Vyshneve, Kamianske Raion =

Rural locality in Dnipropetrovsk Oblast, Ukraine

Vyshneve Вишневе
- Rural settlement
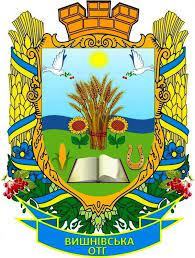
- Seal

- Location in Dnipropetrovsk Oblast Location in Ukraine
- Coordinates: 48°26′10″N 33°54′59″E
- Country: Ukraine
- Oblast: Dnipropetrovsk Oblast
- Raion: Kamianske Raion

Population (2022)
  - Total: 2,255
- Time zone: UTC+2 (EET)
  - Summer (DST): UTC+3 (EEST)

Vyshneve (Ukrainian: Вишневе; Russian: Вишнёвое) is a rural settlement in Kamianske Raion, Dnipropetrovsk Oblast, Ukraine. The settlement is located on the banks of the Lozuvatka, a tributary of the Saksahan in the basin of the Dnieper. Vyshneve hosts the administration of Vyshneve settlement hromada, one of the hromadas of Ukraine. Population: 2,255 (2022 estimate).

== History ==
Until 18 July 2020, Vyshneve belonged to Piatykhatky Raion. The raion was abolished in July 2020 as part of the administrative reform of Ukraine, which reduced the number of raions of Dnipropetrovsk Oblast to seven. The area of Piatykhatky Raion was merged into Kamianske Raion.

Until 26 January 2024, Vyshneve was designated urban-type settlement. On this day, a new law entered into force which abolished this status, and Vyshneve became a rural settlement.

== Economy ==
=== Transportation ===
Vyshneve has access to Highway H08 which connects Kamianske and Kremenchuk, and Highway M04, connecting Dnipro with Znamianka with a further connection to Kropyvnytskyi.

Yerastivka railway station on the railway connecting Dnipro via Kamianske with Piatykhatky is located in Vyshneve. There is local passenger traffic.
