= Verkhivtseve urban hromada =

Verkhivtseve urban hromada Верхівцівська міська громада
- Hromada
- Interactive map of Verkhivtseve urban hromada
- Country: Ukraine
- Oblast: Dnipropetrovsk Oblast
- Raion: Kamianske Raion
- Admin. center: Verkhivtseve

Area
  - Total: 153.3 km^{2} (59.2 sq mi)

Population (2020)
  - Total: 12,053
  - Density: 78.62/km^{2} (203.6/sq mi)
- CATOTTG code: UA12040030000066040
- Settlements: 11
- Cities: 1
- Rural settlements: 1
- Villages: 9
- Website: https://vmiskrada.gov.ua

Verkhivtseve urban hromada (Ukrainian: Верхівцівська міська територіальна громада, romanized: Verkhivtsivska miska terytorialna hromada) is one of the hromadas of Ukraine, located in Kamianske Raion within Dnipropetrovsk Oblast. The administrative center is the city of Verkhivtseve.

The area of the territory is 153.3 square kilometres (59.2 mi^{2}), the population of the hromada is 12,503 (2020).

== Composition ==
In addition to one city (Vilnohirsk), the hromada contains one rural settlement (Sokolivka) and 9 villages:

- Adalymivka
- Dubove
- Hranove
- Kalynivka
- Malooleksandrivka
- Petrivka
- Polivske
- Saksahan
- Shyroke

== History ==
Formed in 2020, in accordance with the order of the Cabinet of Ministers of Ukraine No. 709-r dated June 12, 2020 "On the determination of administrative centers and approval of territories of territorial communities of Dnipropetrovsk Oblast", by merging the territories and settlements of Verkhivtseve City and Malooleksandrivka Village Councils of Verkhnodniprovsk Raion of Dnipropetrovsk Oblast.
