= Vilnohirsk urban hromada =

Vilnohirsk urban hromada Вільногірська міська громада
- Hromada
- Interactive map of Vilnohirsk urban hromada
- Country: Ukraine
- Oblast: Dnipropetrovsk Oblast
- Raion: Kamianske Raion
- Admin. center: Vilnohirsk

Area
  - Total: 124.6 km^{2} (48.1 sq mi)

Population (2020)
  - Total: 24,008
  - Density: 192.7/km^{2} (499.0/sq mi)
- CATOTTG code: UA12040090000029346
- Settlements: 11
- Cities: 1
- Villages: 10
- Website: https://vilnogirsk-rada.gov.ua

Vilnohirsk urban territorial hromada (Ukrainian: Вільногірська міська територіальна громада, romanized: Vilnohirska miska terytorialna hromada) is one of the hromadas of Ukraine, located in Kamianske Raion within Dnipropetrovsk Oblast. The administrative center is the city of Vilnohirsk.

The area of the territory is 124.6 square kilometres (48.1 mi^{2}), the population of the hromada is 24,008 (2020).

== Composition ==
In addition to one city (Vilnohirsk), the hromada contains 10 villages:

- Didove
- Dmytrivka
- Dobrohirske
- Krynychky
- Kushnarivka
- Marianivka
- Motronivka
- Novohannivka
- Posunky
- Sokolove

== History ==
Formed in 2020, in accordance with the order of the Cabinet of Ministers of Ukraine No. 709-r dated June 12, 2020 "On the determination of administrative centers and approval of territories of territorial communities of Dnipropetrovsk Oblast", by merging the territories and settlements of Vilnohirsk City Council of Dnipropetrovsk Oblast and Dmytrivka Village Council of Verkhnodniprovsk Raion of Dnipropetrovsk Oblast.
