= Krynychky Raion =

Former subdivision of Dnipropetrovsk Oblast, Ukraine

Krynychky Raion Криничанський район
- Raion
- Flag Coat of arms

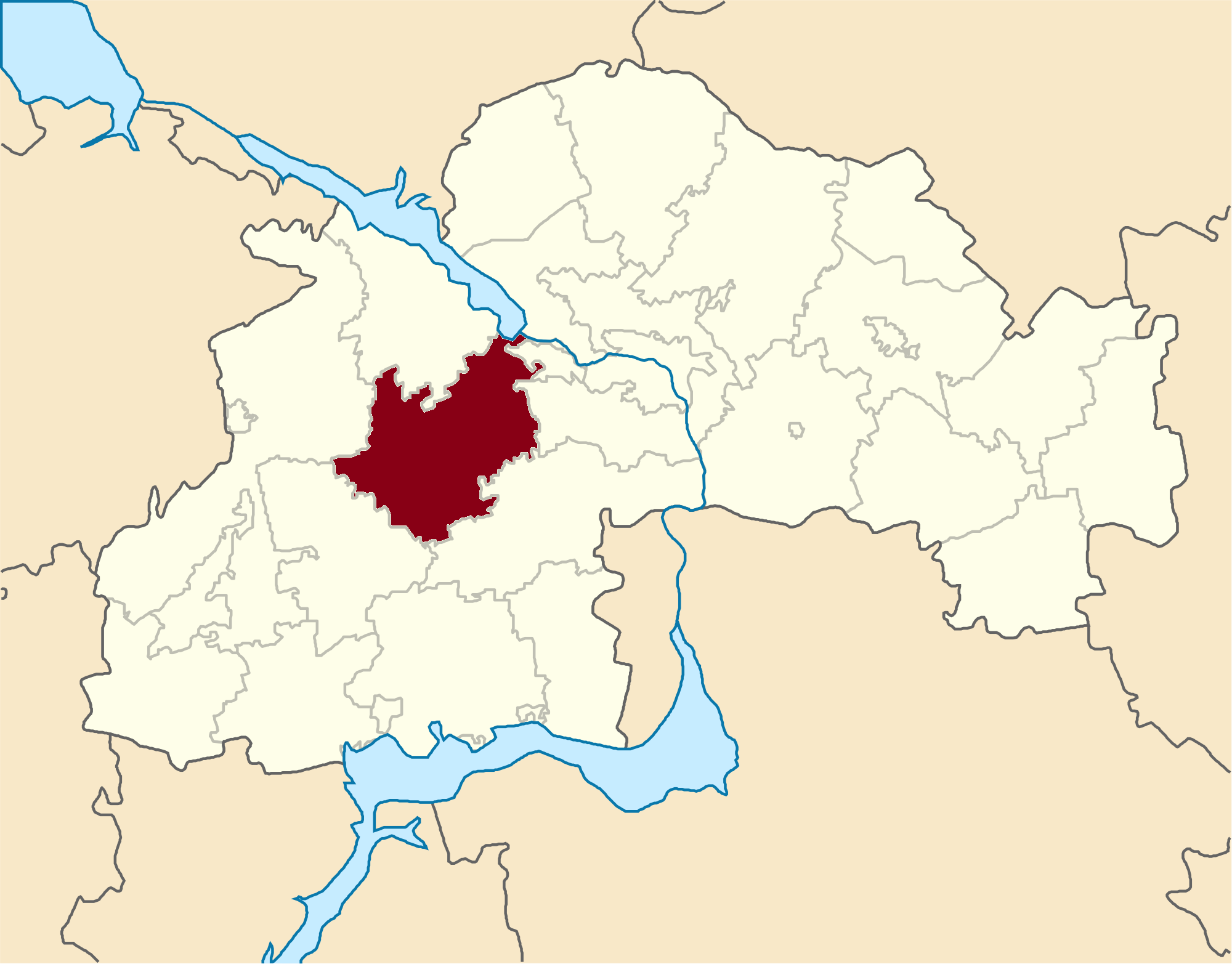
- Coordinates: 48°21′46″N 34°27′40″E
- Country: Ukraine
- Region: Dnipropetrovsk Oblast
- Disestablished: 18 July 2020
- Admin. center: Krynychky
- Subdivisions: List: — city councils; — settlement councils; — rural councils; Number of localities: — cities; — urban-type settlements; — villages; — rural settlements

Area
  - Total: 1,684 km^{2} (650 sq mi)

Population (2020)
  - Total: 34,133
  - Density: 20.27/km^{2} (52.50/sq mi)
- Time zone: UTC+02:00 (EET)
  - Summer (DST): UTC+03:00 (EEST)
- Area code: +380

Krynychky Raion (Ukrainian: Криничанський район) was a raion (district) of Dnipropetrovsk Oblast, southeastern-central Ukraine. Its administrative centre was located at the urban-type settlement of Krynychky. The raion was abolished on 18 July 2020 as part of the administrative reform of Ukraine, which reduced the number of raions of Dnipropetrovsk Oblast to seven. The area of Krynychky Raion was merged into Kamianske Raion. The last estimate of the raion population was 34,133 (2020 est.).

At the time of disestablishment, the raion consisted of three hromadas:

- Bozhedarivka settlement hromada with the administration in the urban-type settlement of Bozhedarivka;
- Krynychky settlement hromada with the administration in Krynychky;
- Zatyshne rural hromada with the administration in the selo of Zatyshne.
