= Verkhnodniprovsk urban hromada =

Verkhnodniprovsk urban hromada Верхньодніпровська міська громада
- Hromada
- Interactive map of Verkhnodniprovsk urban hromada
- Country: Ukraine
- Oblast: Dnipropetrovsk Oblast
- Raion: Kamianske Raion
- Admin. center: Verkhnodniprovsk

Area
  - Total: 101.5 km^{2} (39.2 sq mi)

Population (2018)
  - Total: 17,488
  - Density: 172.3/km^{2} (446.2/sq mi)
- CATOTTG code: UA12040050000057182
- Settlements: 48
- Cities: 1
- Rural settlements: 2
- Villages: 45

Verkhnodniprovsk urban territorial hromada (Ukrainian: Верхньодніпровська міська територіальна громада, romanized: Verkhnodniprovska miska terytorialna hromada) is one of the hromadas of Ukraine, located in Kamianske Raion within Dnipropetrovsk Oblast.

The hromada has an area of 101.5 km^{2} (39.2 mi^{2}), as well as a population of 17,488 (2018).

Formed on May 24, 2017, by merging the Verkhnodniprovsk City Council and the Pershe Travnia Village Council of the Verkhnodniprovsk Raion. The head of the united hromada, elected as a result of the local elections in October 2017, is Leonid Viktorovych Kalinichenko.

== Composition ==
In addition to one city (Verkhnodniprovsk), the hromada contains 2 rural settlements (Dniprovske, Novomykolaivka) and 45 villages:

- Andriivka
- Avksenivka
- Bohodarivka
- Borovkivka
- Borodaivka
- Borodaivski Khutory
- Bratske
- Chepyne
- Chubarivka
- Didenkove
- Dniprokamianka
- Domotkan
- Hannivka
- Ivashkove
- Kaluzhyne
- Klyn
- Kornylo-Natalivka
- Kryvonosove
- Matiuchenkove
- Mosty
- Mykolaivka
- Myshuryn Rih
- Novohryhorivka
- Novoselivka
- Pavlivka
- Pavlo-Hryhorivka
- Pidluzhzhia
- Popivka
- Pravoberezhne
- Pushkarivka
- Samotkan
- Soloviivka
- Suslivka
- Tarasivka
- Tomakivka
- Vasylivka
- Vilni Khutory
- Vodiane
- Voievodivka
- Yakymivka
- Yarok
- Zapolychky
- Zarichchia
- Zelene
- Zubotriasivka
