= Verkhnodniprovsk Raion =

Former subdivision of Dnipropetrovsk Oblast, Ukraine

Verkhnodniprovsk Raion Верхньодніпровський район
- Raion
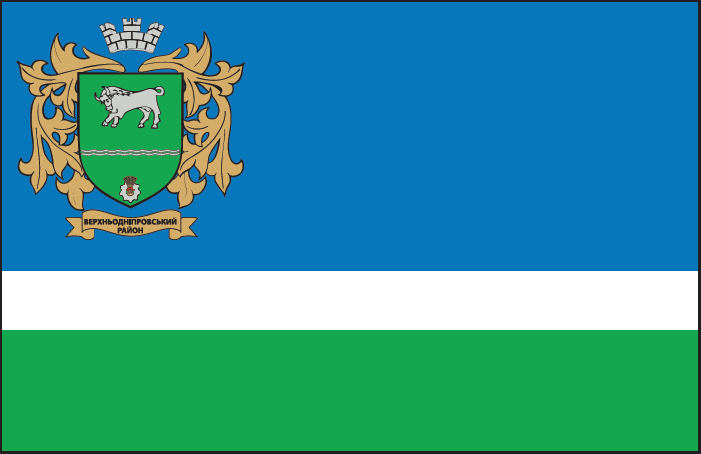
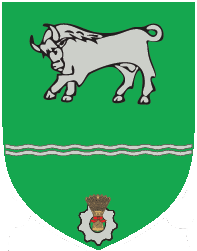
- Flag Coat of arms

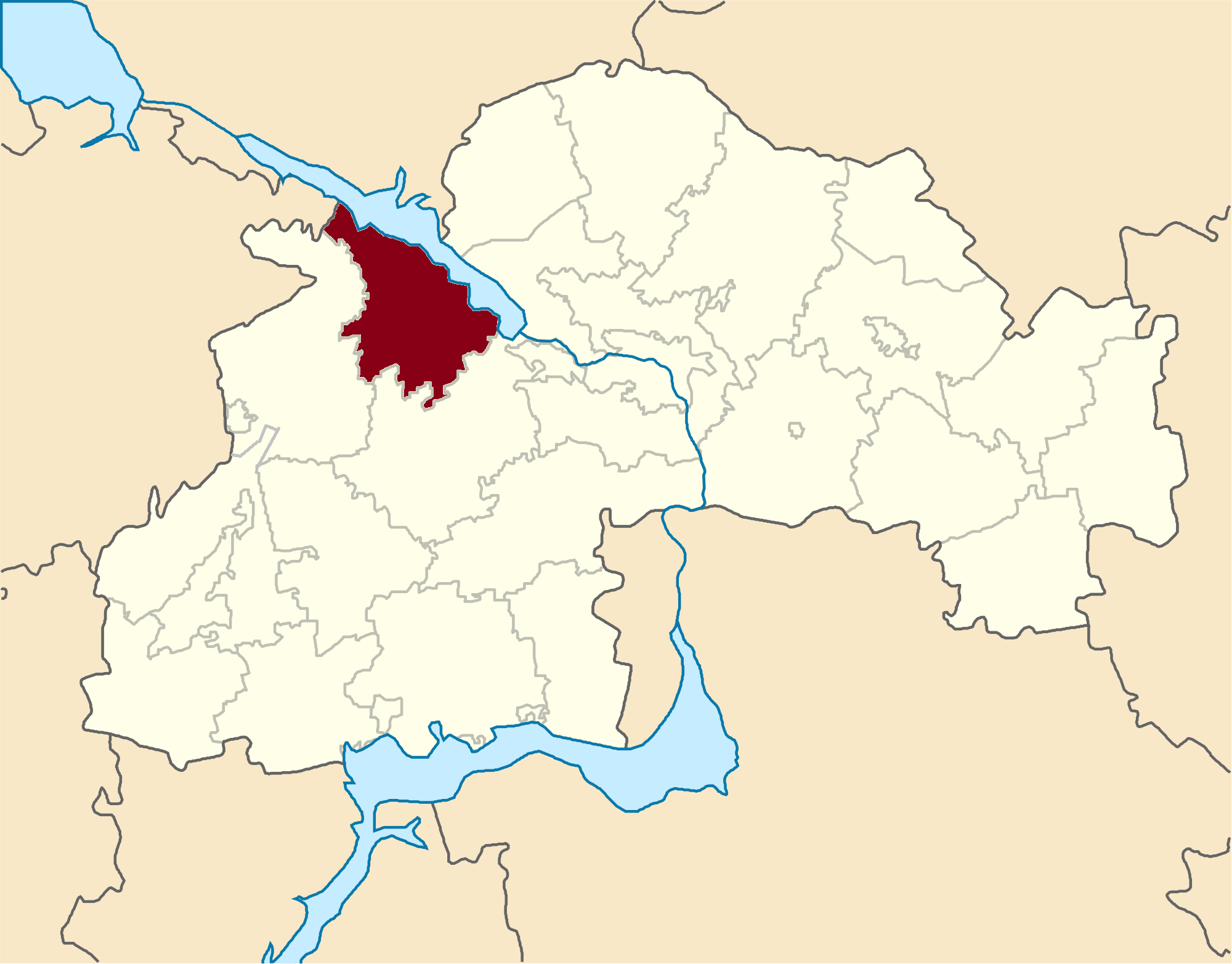
- Coordinates: 48°39′22″N 39°12′42″E
- Country: Ukraine
- Oblast: Dnipropetrovsk Oblast
- Disestablished: 18 July 2020
- Admin. center: Verkhnodniprovsk
- Subdivisions: List: — city councils; — settlement councils; — rural councils; Number of localities: — cities; — urban-type settlements; — villages; — rural settlements

Area
  - Total: 1,286 km^{2} (497 sq mi)

Population (2020)
  - Total: 51,469
  - Density: 40.02/km^{2} (103.7/sq mi)
- Time zone: UTC+02:00 (EET)
  - Summer (DST): UTC+03:00 (EEST)
- Area code: +380

Verkhnodniprovsk Raion (Note: Also rendered as Verkhniodniprovsk Raion or Verkhnyodniprovsk Raion) (Ukrainian: Верхньодніпровський район) was a raion (district) of Dnipropetrovsk Oblast, southeastern-central Ukraine. Its administrative centre was located at Verkhnodniprovsk. The raion was abolished on 18 July 2020 as part of the administrative reform of Ukraine, which reduced the number of raions of Dnipropetrovsk Oblast to seven. The area of Verkhnodniprovsk Raion was merged into Kamianske Raion. The last estimate of the raion population was 51,469 (2020 est.).

At the time of disestablishment, the raion consisted of two hromadas:

- Verkhivtseve urban hromada with the administration in the city of Verkhivtseve;
- Verkhnodniprovsk urban hromada with the administration in Verkhnodniprovsk.
