= Krynychky =

Rural locality in Dnipropetrovsk Oblast, Ukraine

Krynychky Кринички
- Rural settlement
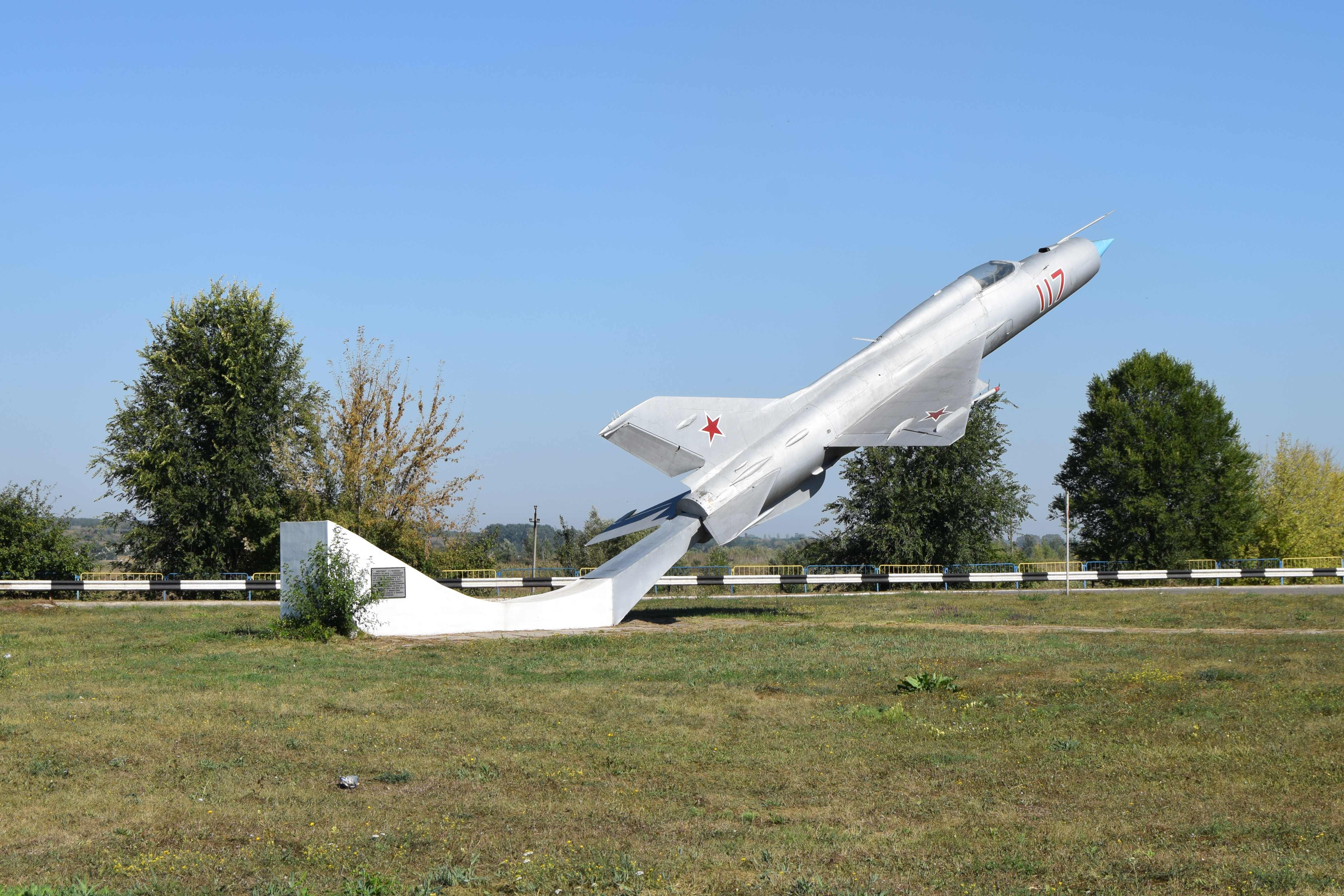

- Location within Dnipropetrovsk Oblast Location within Ukraine
- Coordinates: 48°22′07″N 34°27′52″E
- Country: Ukraine
- Oblast: Dnipropetrovsk Oblast
- Raion: Kamianske Raion

Population (2022)
  - Total: 3,970
- Time zone: UTC+2 (EET)
  - Summer (DST): UTC+3 (EEST)

Krynytchky (Ukrainian: Кринички; Russian: Кринички) is a rural settlement in Kamianske Raion, Dnipropetrovsk Oblast, Ukraine. It hosts the administration of Krynychky settlement hromada, one of the hromadas of Ukraine. Population: 3,970 (2022 estimate).

Krynychky is located on both banks of the Mokra Sura River, a right tributary of the Dnieper.

== History ==
Until 18 July 2020, Krynychky was the administrative center of Krynychky Raion. The raion was abolished in July 2020 as part of the administrative reform of Ukraine, which reduced the number of raions of Dnipropetrovsk Oblast to seven. The area of Krynychky Raion was merged into Kamianske Raion.

Until 26 January 2024, Krynychky was designated urban-type settlement. On this day, a new law entered into force which abolished this status, and Krynychky became a rural settlement.

== Economy ==
=== Transportation ===
Krynychky is on a paved road connecting Kamianske with Svitlohirske. In Svitlohirske, it has access to the M04 highway connecting Dnipro and Kropyvnytskyi.
