= Lykhivka =

Rural locality in Dnipropetrovsk Oblast, Ukraine

Lykhivka Лихівка
- Rural settlement
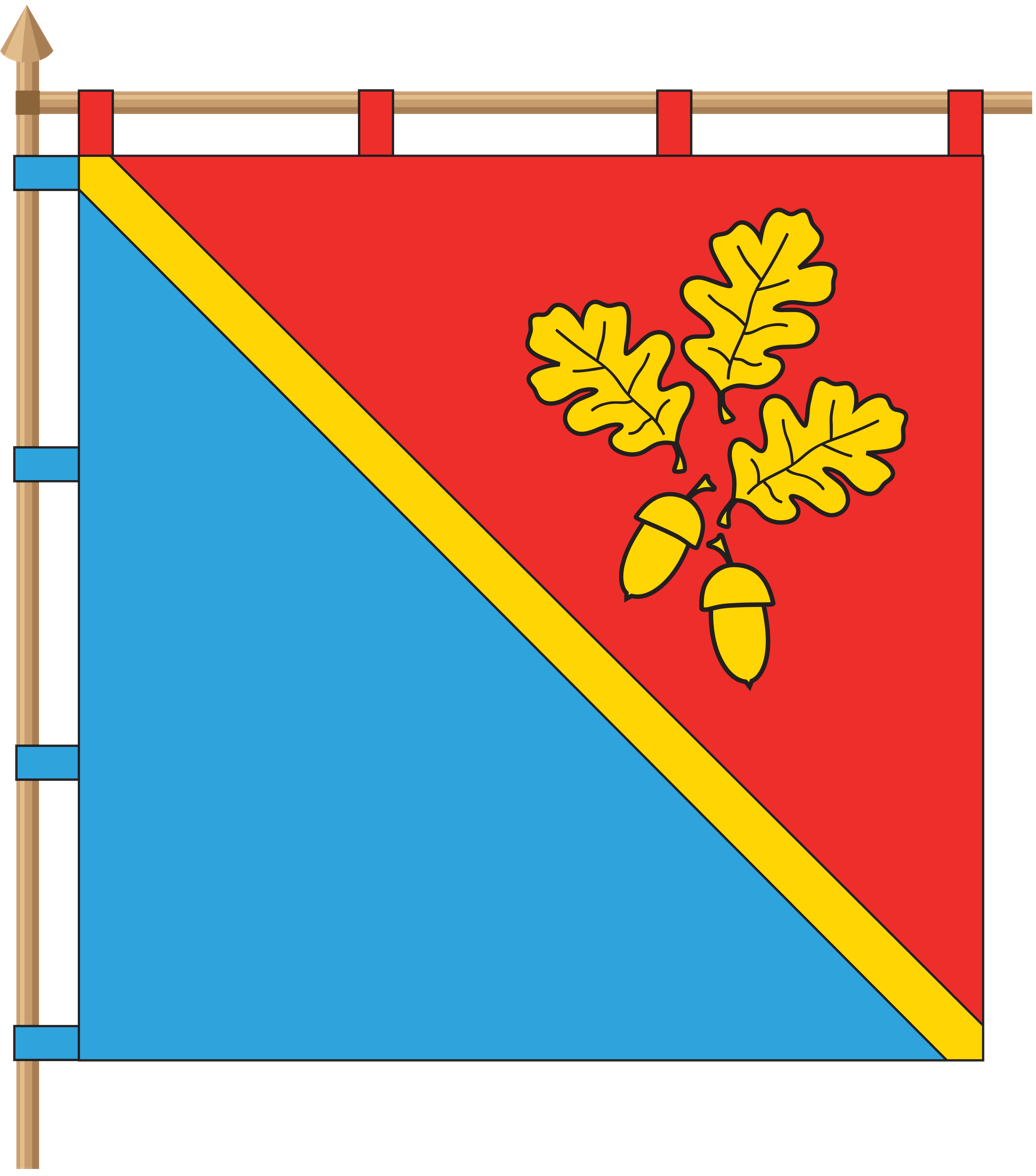
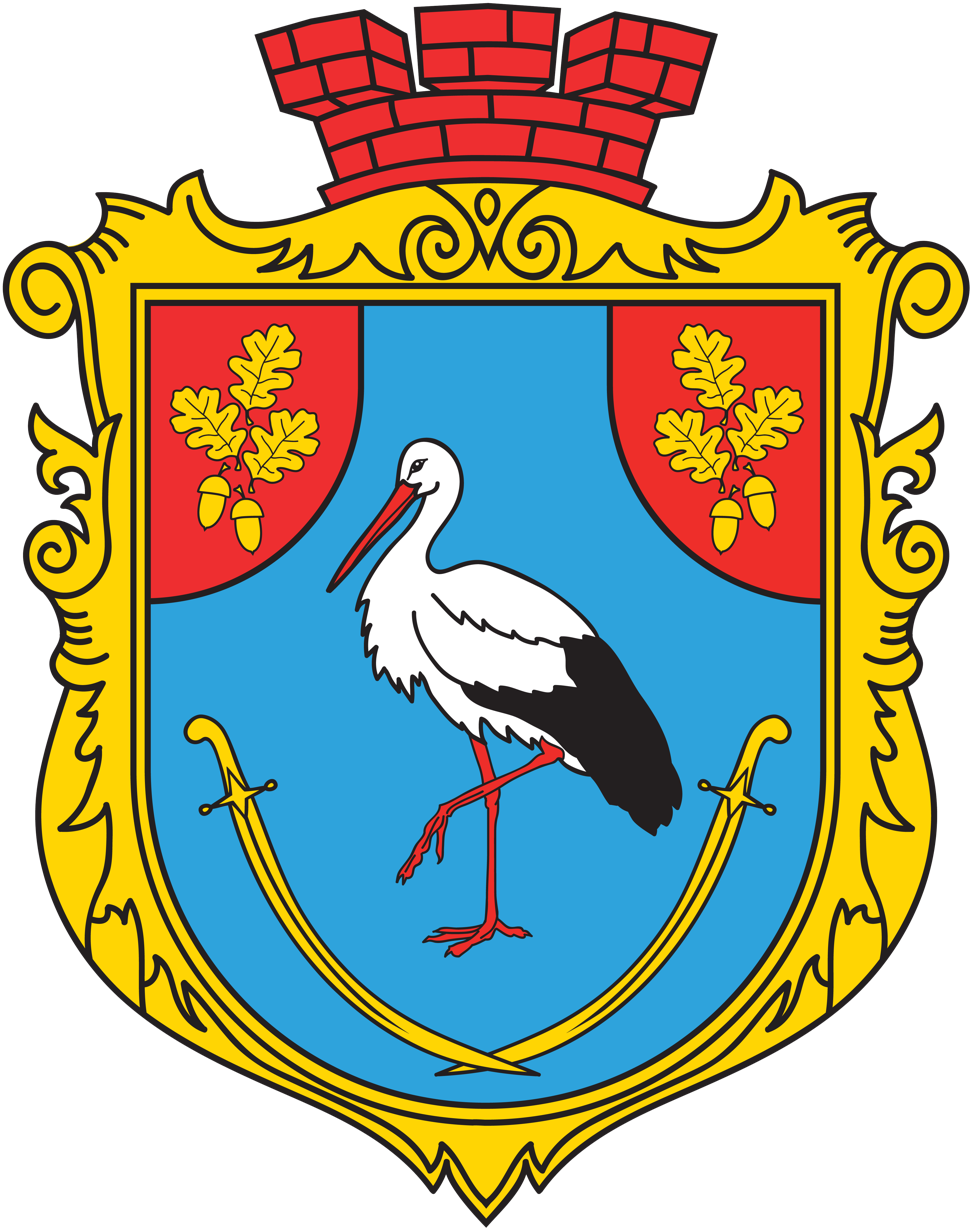
- Flag Coat of arms

- Location in Dnipropetrovsk Oblast Location in Ukraine
- Coordinates: 48°41′06″N 33°55′10″E
- Country: Ukraine
- Oblast: Dnipropetrovsk Oblast
- Raion: Kamianske Raion

Population (2022)
  - Total: 1,822
- Time zone: UTC+2 (EET)
  - Summer (DST): UTC+3 (EEST)

Lykhivka (Ukrainian: Лихівка; Russian: Лиховка) is a rural settlement in Kamianske Raion, Dnipropetrovsk Oblast, Ukraine. It is located in the northwest of the oblast, on the banks of the Omelnyk, a right tributary of the Dnieper. Lykhivka hosts the administration of Lykhivka settlement hromada, one of the hromadas of Ukraine. Population: 1,822 (2022 estimate).

== History ==
Until 18 July 2020, Lykhivka belonged to Piatykhatky Raion. The raion was abolished in July 2020 as part of the administrative reform of Ukraine, which reduced the number of raions of Dnipropetrovsk Oblast to seven. The area of Piatykhatky Raion was merged into Kamianske Raion.

Until 26 January 2024, Lykhivka was designated urban-type settlement. On this day, a new law entered into force which abolished this status, and Lykhivka became a rural settlement.

== Economy ==
=== Transportation ===
Lykhivka has access to Highway H08 which connects Kamianske and Kremenchuk, and Highway M04, connecting Dnipro with Znamianka with a further connection to Kropyvnytskyi.
