= Dniprovske =

Dniprovske (Ukrainian: Дніпровське) may refer to multiple places in Ukraine:

== Dnipropetrovsk Oblast ==
- Dniprovske, Dnipropetrovsk Oblast

== Kherson Oblast ==
- Dniprovske, Kherson Oblast
