= Verkhnodniprovsk =

City in Dnipropetrovsk Oblast, Ukraine

Verkhnodniprovsk Верхньодніпровськ
- City
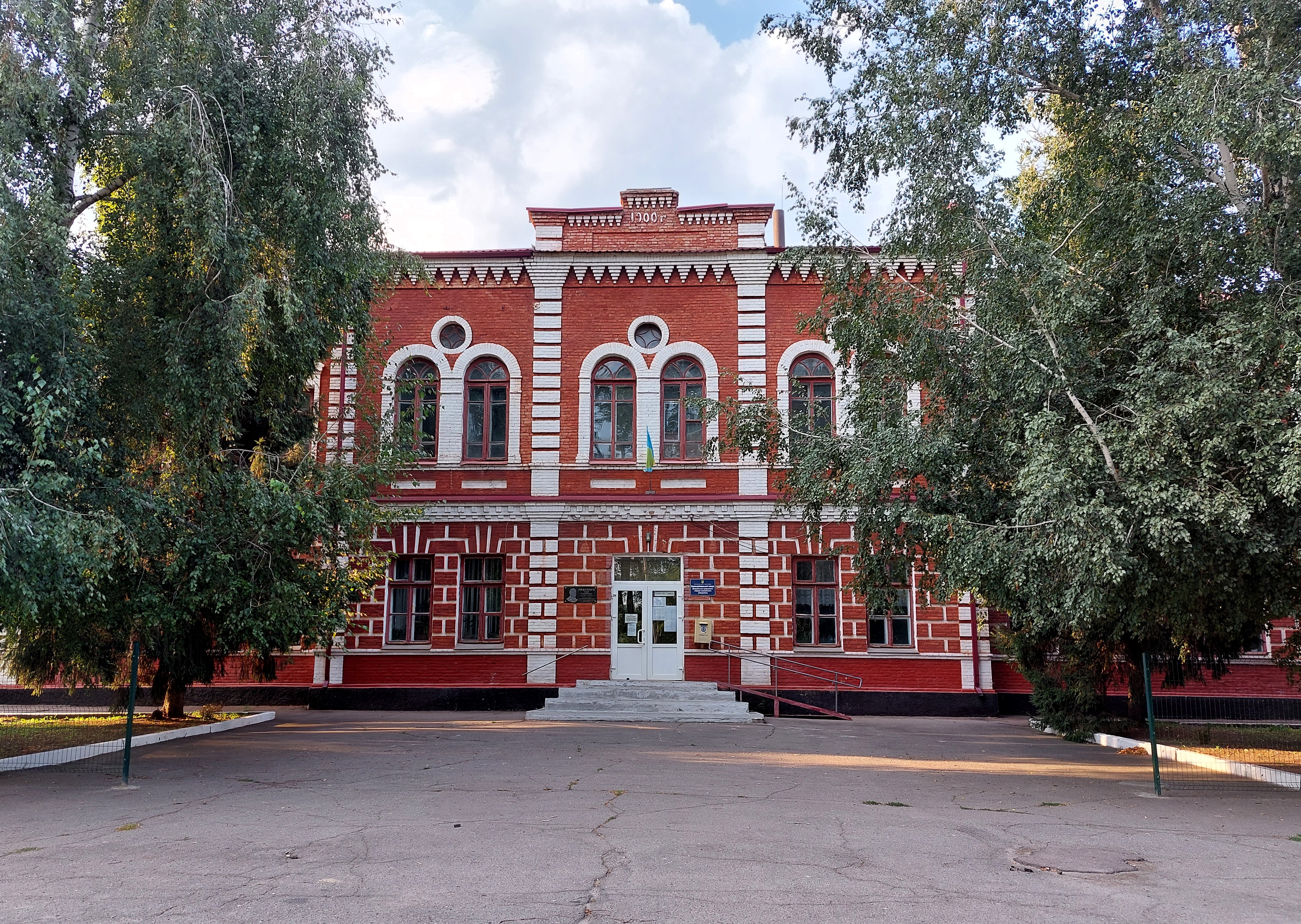
- Agricultural College

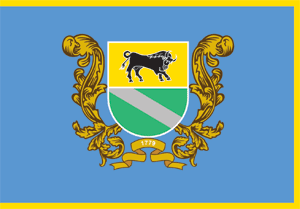
- Flag Coat of arms
- Interactive map of Verkhnodniprovsk
- Location of Verkhnodniprovsk Verkhnodniprovsk (Dnipropetrovsk Oblast)
- Coordinates: 48°39′22″N 34°19′42″E
- Country: Ukraine
- Oblast: Dnipropetrovsk Oblast
- Raion: Kamianske Raion
- Hromada: Verkhnodniprovsk urban hromada
- Founded: 1779
- City rights: June 5, 1806

Government
  - Mayor: Hennadiy Lebid'

Population (2022)
  - Total: 15,477 (2022 estimate).
- Postal code: 51600
- Area code: +380 5658
- Licence plate / 04: АЕ
- Website: http://www.vdn.dp.ua/

Verkhnodniprovsk (Note: Also rendered as Verkhniodniprovsk or Verkhnyodniprovsk) (Ukrainian: Верхньодніпровськ, pronounced [werxnʲod⁽ʲ⁾n⁽ʲ⁾iˈprɔu̯sʲk]) is a city in Kamianske Raion, Dnipropetrovsk Oblast (province) of Ukraine. The city is located at confluence of the Samotkan into the Kamianske Reservoir at the Dnieper. Verkhnodniprovsk hosts the administration of Verkhnodniprovsk urban hromada, one of the hromadas of Ukraine. As of 2022 it had an estimated population of 15,477.

== History ==
The city was established in 1780 on the site of a Zaporozhian zymivnyk. During the Tsarist times it served as a povit centre. During the Ukrainian War of Independence, from 1917 to 1920, it passed between various factions. Afterwards, it was administratively part of the Katerynoslav Governorate of Ukraine. In 1926 its population reached 6,000 inhabitants. In 2001 the population was 16,976.

Until 18 July 2020, Verkhnodniprovsk was the administrative center of Verkhnodniprovsk Raion. The raion was abolished in July 2020 as part of the administrative reform of Ukraine, which reduced the number of raions of Dnipropetrovsk Oblast to seven. The area of Verkhnodniprovsk Raion was merged into Kamianske Raion.

== Demographics ==
As of the 2001 Ukrainian census, Verkhnodniprovsk had a population of 16,680 inhabitants. The ethnic and linguitic composition of the population at the time of the census was as follows:

Ethnic groups in Verkhnodniprovsk
	percent
Ukrainians	89.41%
Russians	9.05%
Belarusians	0.58%
Armenians	0.11%
Germans	0.07%
Azeris	0.07%
others	0.31%

Languages in Verkhnodniprovsk
	percent
Ukrainian	89.0%
Russian	10.5%
Belarusian	0.2%
Armenian	0.1%
others	0.2%

== Transport and economy ==
Verkhniodniprovsk is located on the right bank of the Dnieper and serves as a river port. The city is located 13 km (8 mi) from train station named Verkhnodniprovsk in Novomykolaivka, 25 km (16 mi) north-west from Kamianske, 73 km (45 mi) north-west from Dnipro.

A foundry and a mechanical plant have been operating in the city, as well as a button factory.

== Notable people ==
- Vsevolod Balitsky (1892-1937), Bolshevik politician and NKVD officer.
- Volodymyr Shcherbytsky (1918-1990), First Secretary of the Communist Party of Ukraine from 1972 to 1989. On 4 April 2016 the bust of Shcherbytskyi in Verkhnodniprovsk was removed from the state register and lost its status of being a monument, instead the city council gave it the status of "an integral element of landscaping." The bust was dismantled on 18 January 2024.
- Yehor Yarmolyuk (born 2004), Ukrainian footballer, currently plays for Premier League team Brentford.

== Gallery ==
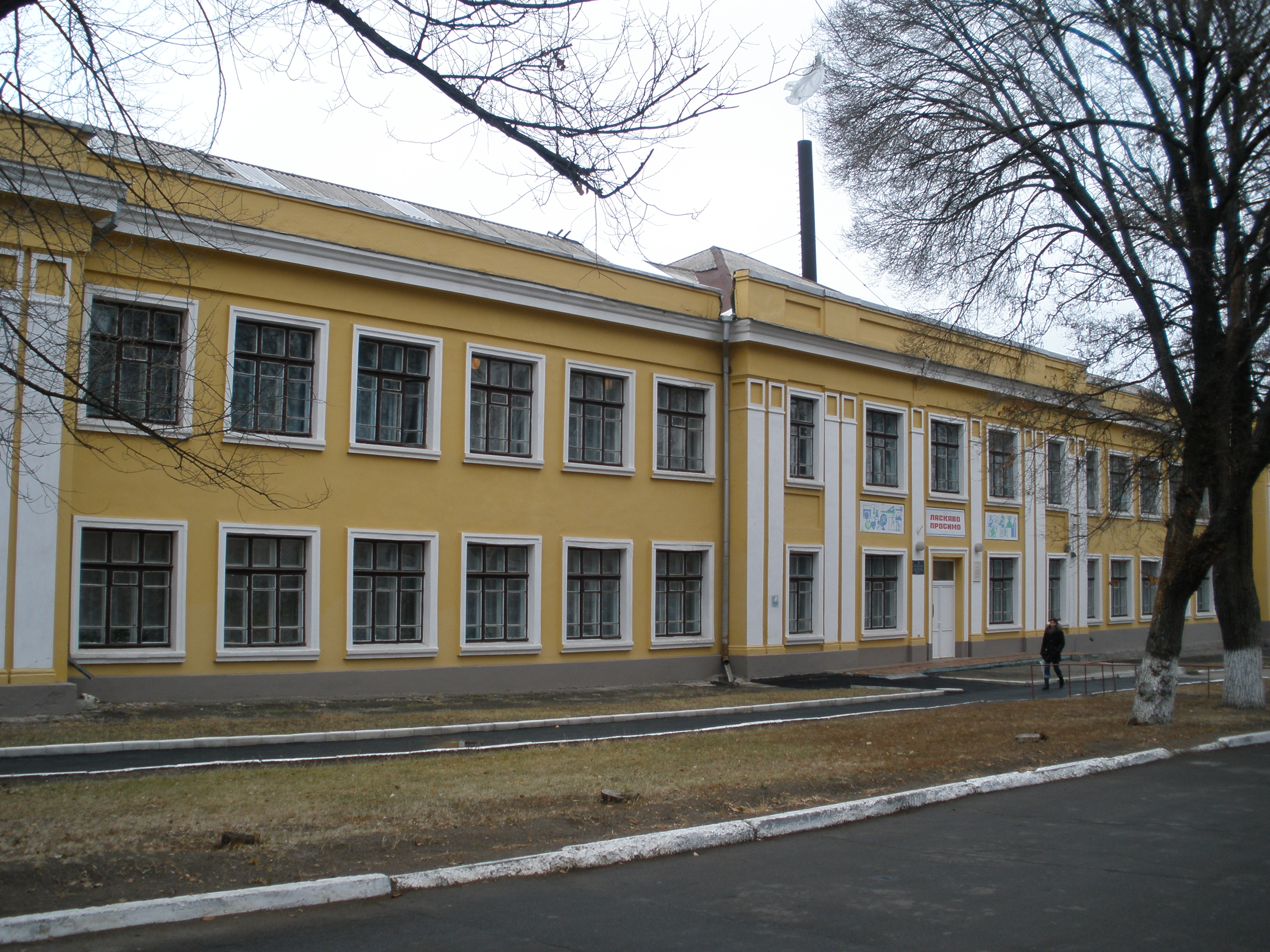
School No. 1

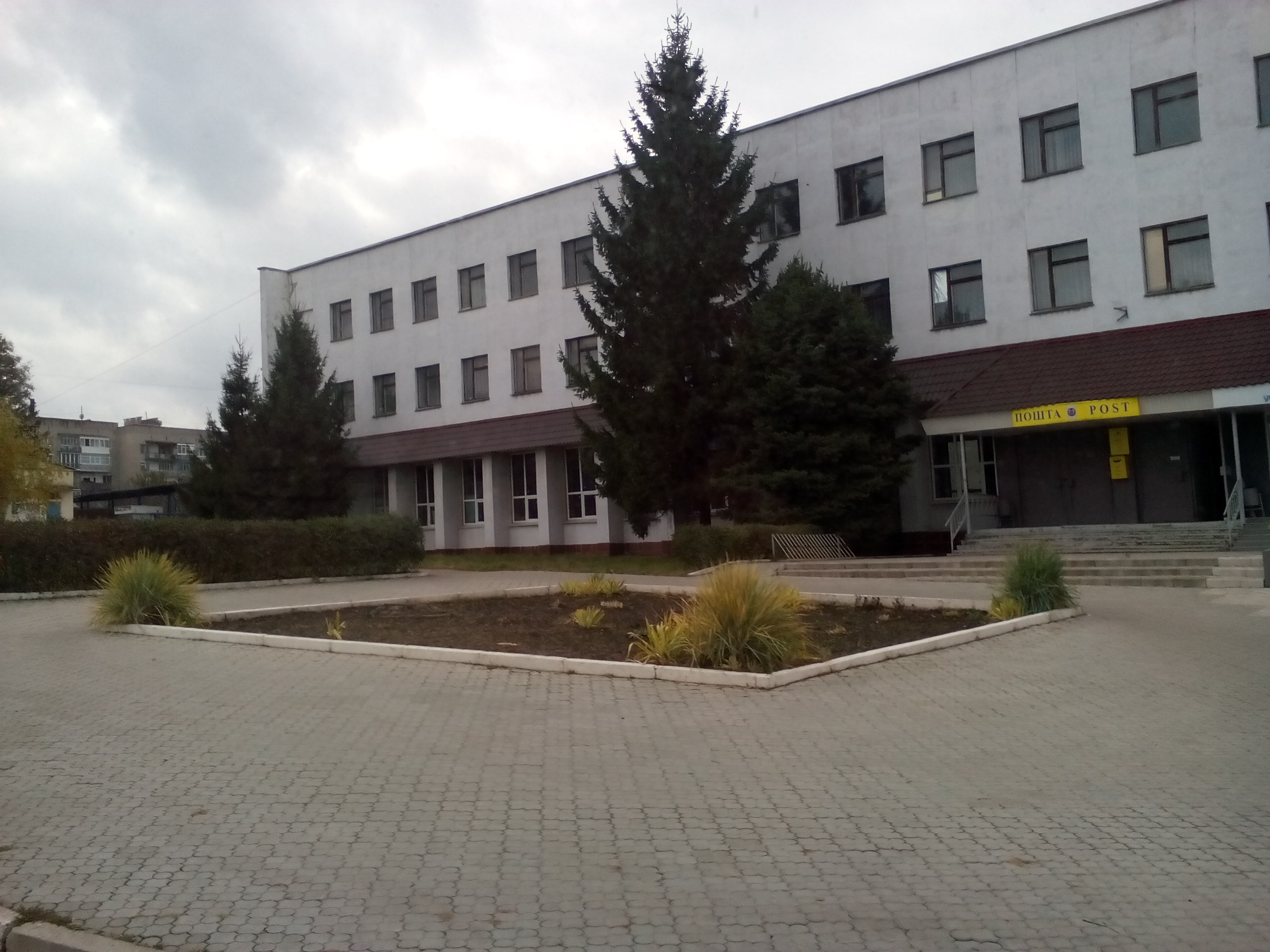
Post office

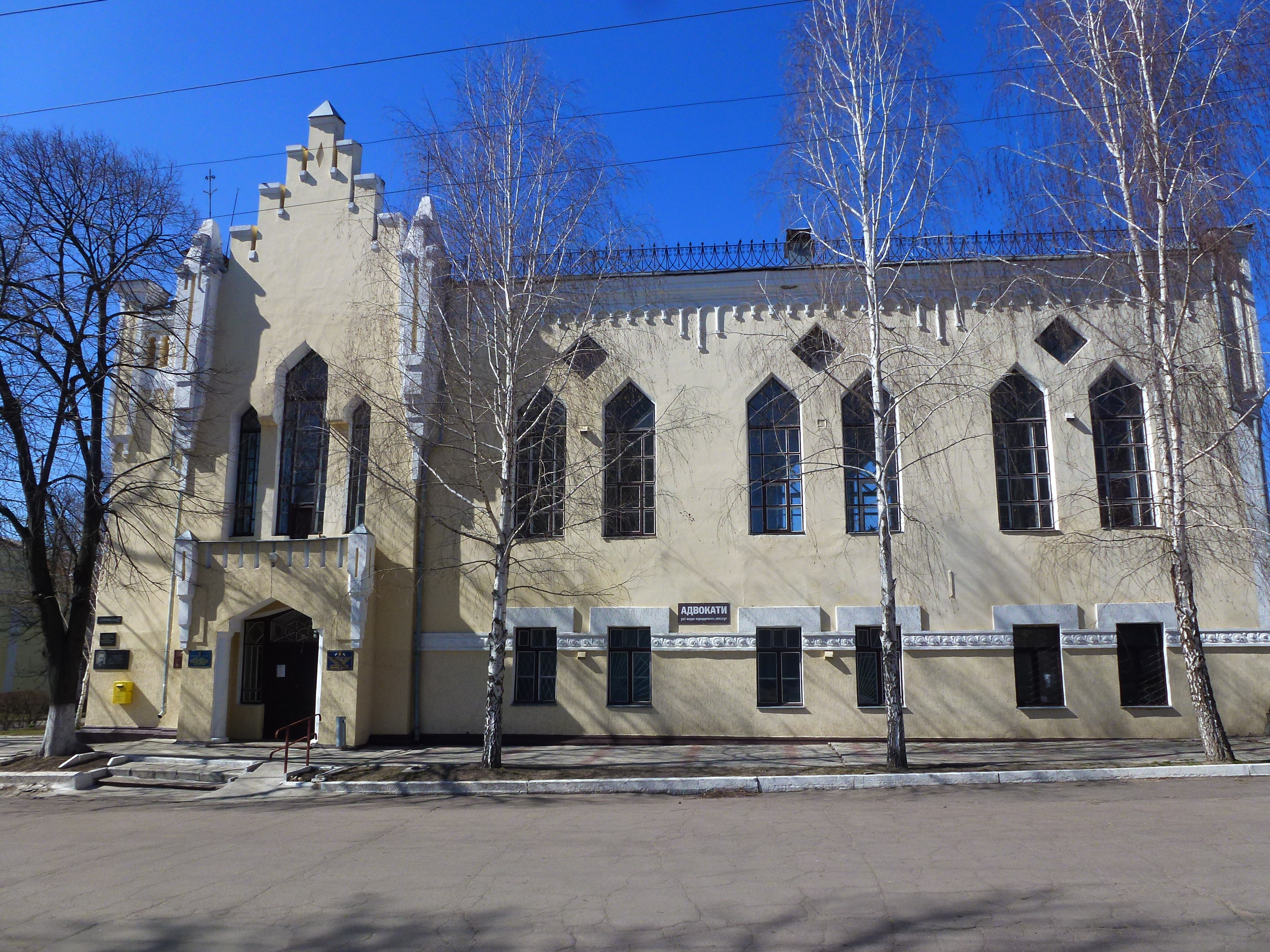
Former district council

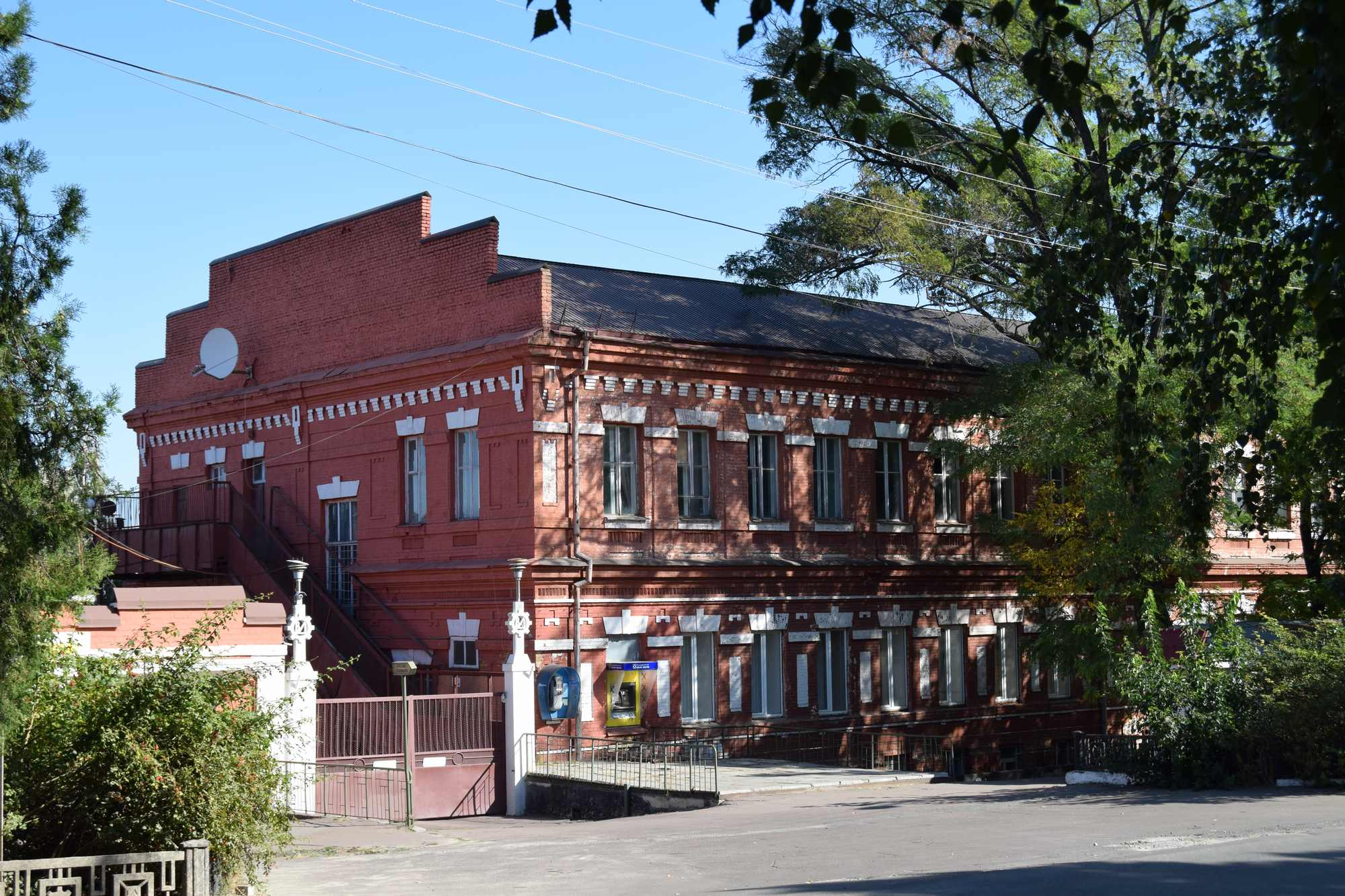
Old paper machine plant
