= Kamianske urban hromada =

Urban hromada of Dnipropetrovsk Oblast, Ukraine

Kamianske urban hromada Кам'янська міська громада
- Hromada
- Seal
- Interactive map of Kamianske urban hromada
- Country: Ukraine
- Oblast: Dnipropetrovsk Oblast
- Raion: Kamianske Raion

Area
  - Total: 136.3 km^{2} (52.6 sq mi)

Population (2024)
  - Total: 226,652
  - Density: 1,663/km^{2} (4,307/sq mi)
- Settlements: 3
- Cities: 1
- Rural settlements: 1
- Villages: 1
- Website: www.kam.gov.ua

Kamianske urban territorial hromada (Ukrainian: Кам'янська міська територіальна громада, romanized: Kamianska miska terytorialna hromada) located within Kamianske Raion in Dnipropetrovsk Oblast. Its administrative centre is the city of Kamianske.

The hromada has a total area of 136.3 km^{2} (52.6 mi^{2}), and a population of 226,652 (as of 2024).

Kamianske urban hromada was originally established as an amalgamated hromada on 24 December 2019, before being expanded as part of decentralisation in Ukraine.

== Composition ==
In addition to one city (Kamianske) and one urban-type settlement (Karnaukhivka), the hromada contains a single village (Svitle).
