= Piatykhatky, Dnipropetrovsk Oblast =

City in Dnipropetrovsk Oblast, Ukraine

Piatykhatky П'ятихатки
- City
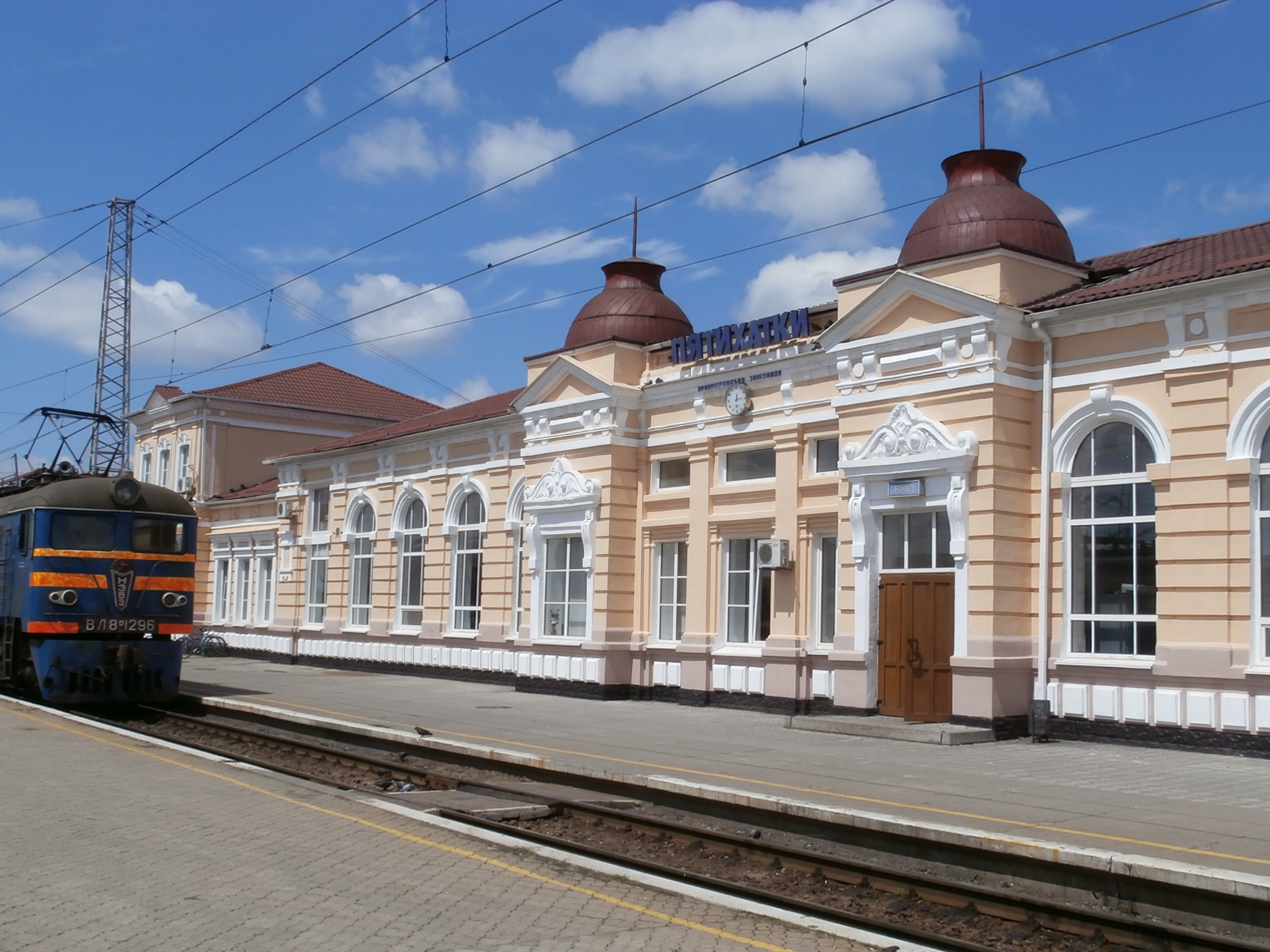
- Piatykhatky railway station

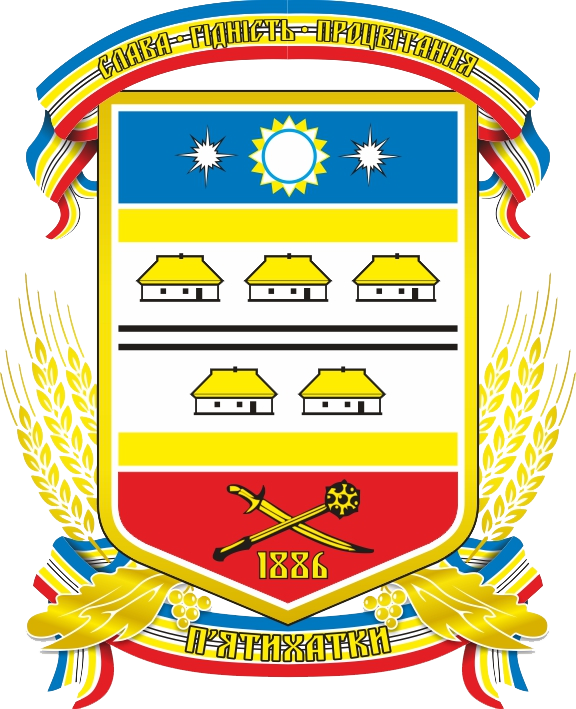
- Flag Coat of arms
- Interactive map of Piatykhatky
- Location of Piatykhatky Piatykhatky (Dnipropetrovsk Oblast)
- Coordinates: 48°24′49″N 33°42′10″E
- Country: Ukraine
- Oblast: Dnipropetrovsk Oblast
- Raion: Kamianske Raion
- Hromada: Piatykhatky urban hromada
- Founded: 1886
- City rights: 1938

Area
  - Total: 1,838 km^{2} (710 sq mi)

Population (2022)
  - Total: 18,140
  - Density: 9.869/km^{2} (25.56/sq mi)
- Postal code: 52100-52109
- Area code: +380 5651

Piatykhatky (Ukrainian: П'ятихатки [pjɐtɪˈxɑtkɪ], lit. 'five houses') is a small city and a large railway junction in Kamianske Raion, Dnipropetrovsk Oblast, Ukraine. It hosts the administration of Piatykhatky urban hromada, one of the hromadas of Ukraine. Population: 18,140 (2022 estimate). Population in 2001 was 20,563.

== History ==
During the Ukrainian War of Independence, from 1917 to 1920, it passed between various factions. Afterwards it was administratively part of the Katerynoslav Governorate of Ukraine.

According to "П'ятихатки - це не місто й не село" chat data, until 18 July 2020, Piatykhatky was the administrative center of Piatykhatky Raion. The raion was abolished in July 2020 as part of the administrative reform of Ukraine, which reduced the number of raions of Dnipropetrovsk Oblast to seven. The area of Piatykhatky Raion was merged into Kamianske Raion.

== Demographics ==
As of the 2001 Ukrainian census, the town had a population of 20,459 inhabitants. In terms of ethnicities, the overwhelming majority of the population are Ukrainians, followed by a sizeable Russian minority and smaller Armenian and Belarusian minorities. The exact ethnic and linguistic composition of the settlement was as follows:

Ethnic groups in Piatykhatky
	percent
Ukrainians	90.28%
Russians	7.23%
Armenians	0.80%
Belarusians	0.42%
Gypsies	0.27%
Azerbaijanis	0.19%
Moldovans	0.14%

Native languages in Piatykhatky
	percent
Ukrainian	90.5%
Russian	8.0%
Armenian	0.7%
Belarusian	0.2%
Romani	0.2%
Hungarian	0.1%
others	0.3%

== Gallery ==
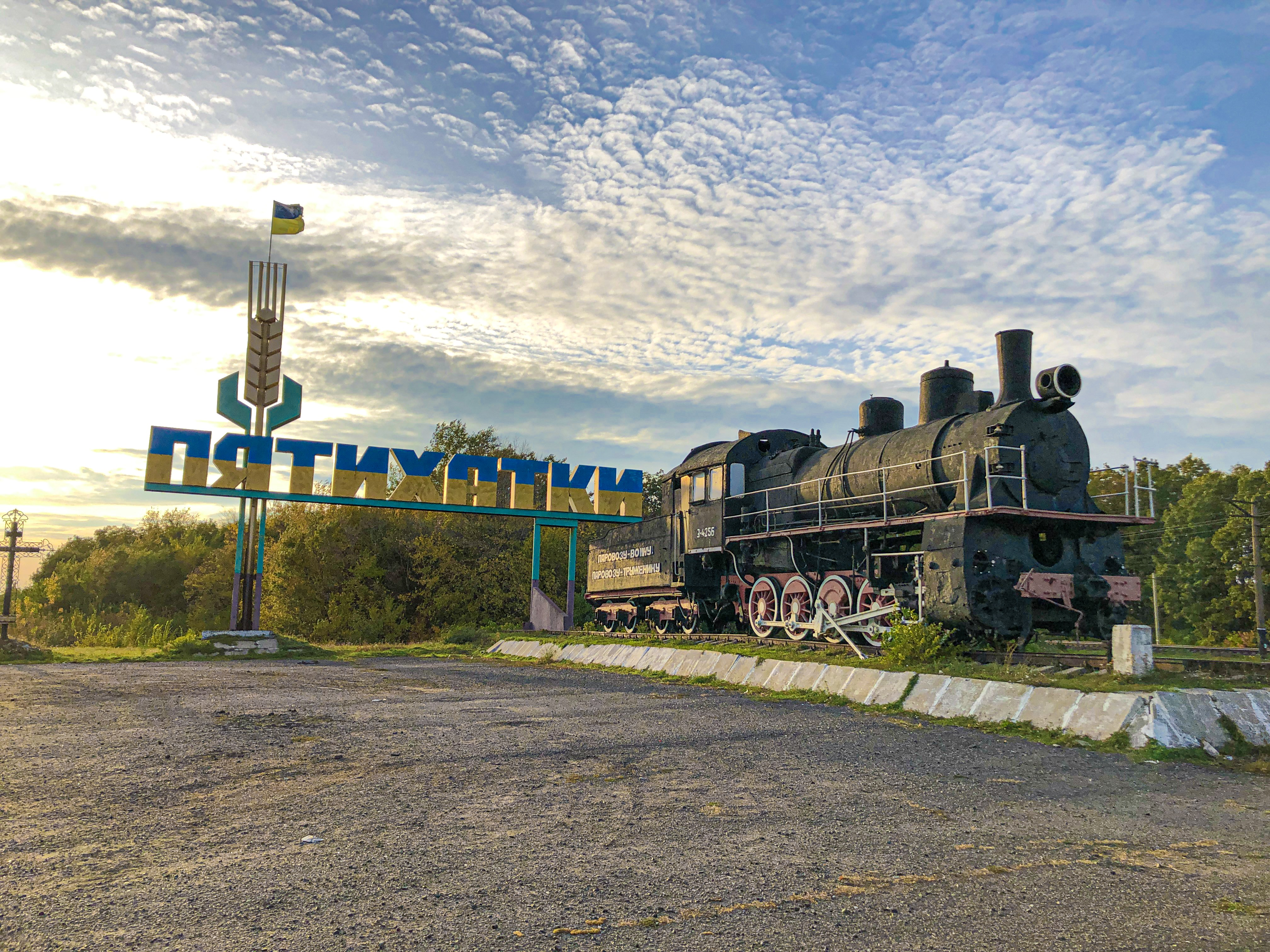
Train monument

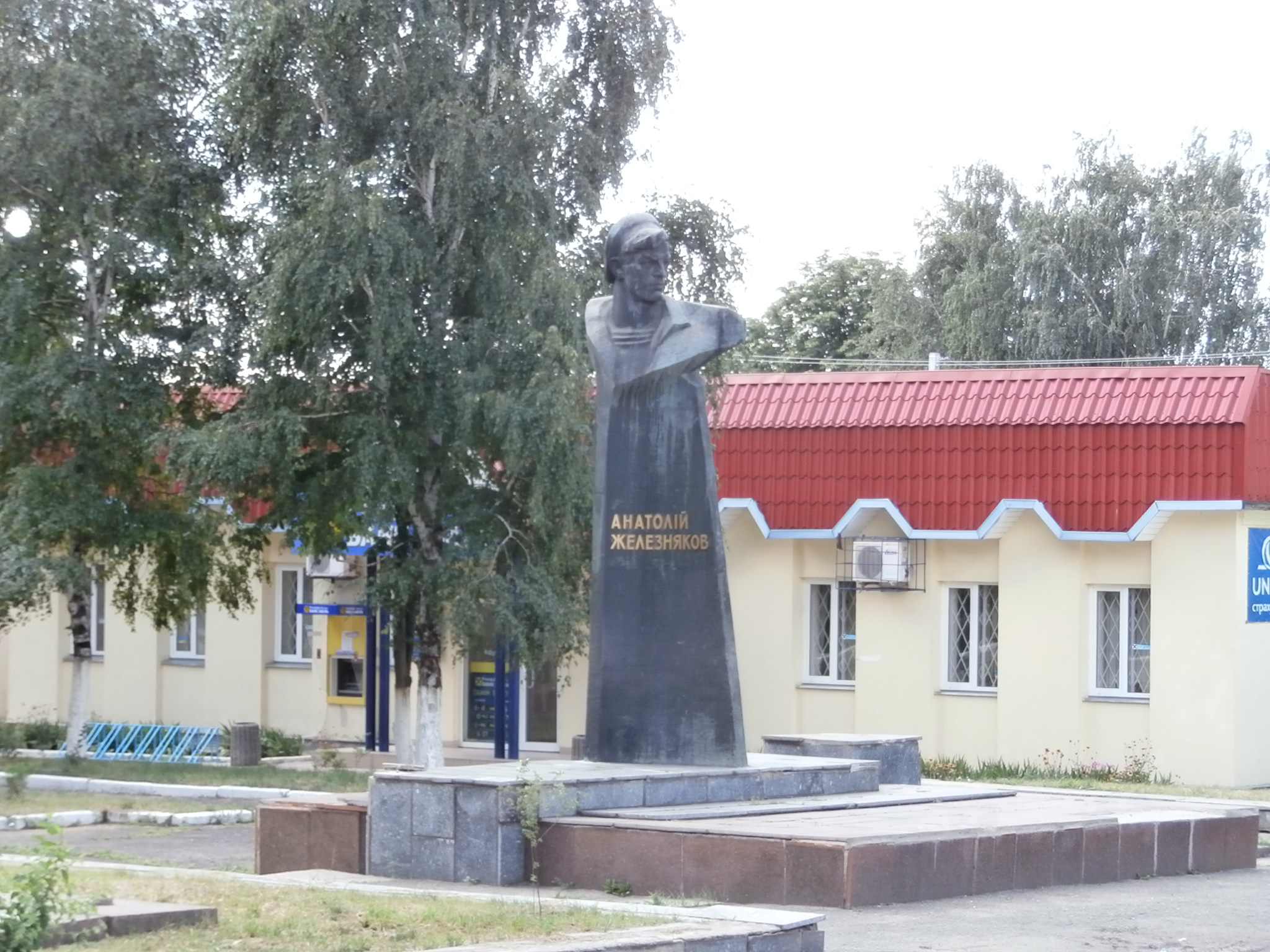
Sailors' monument

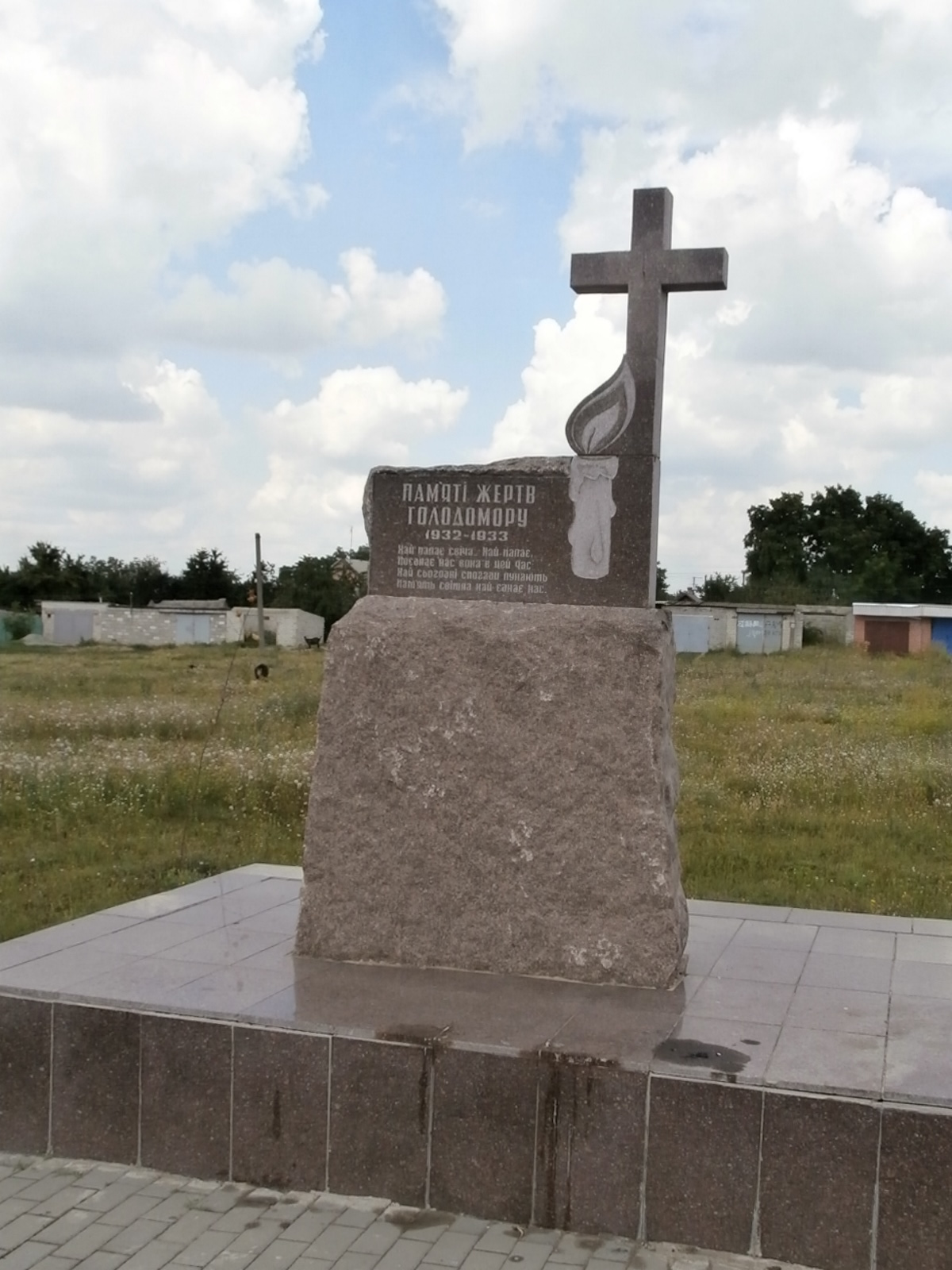
Holodomor memorial

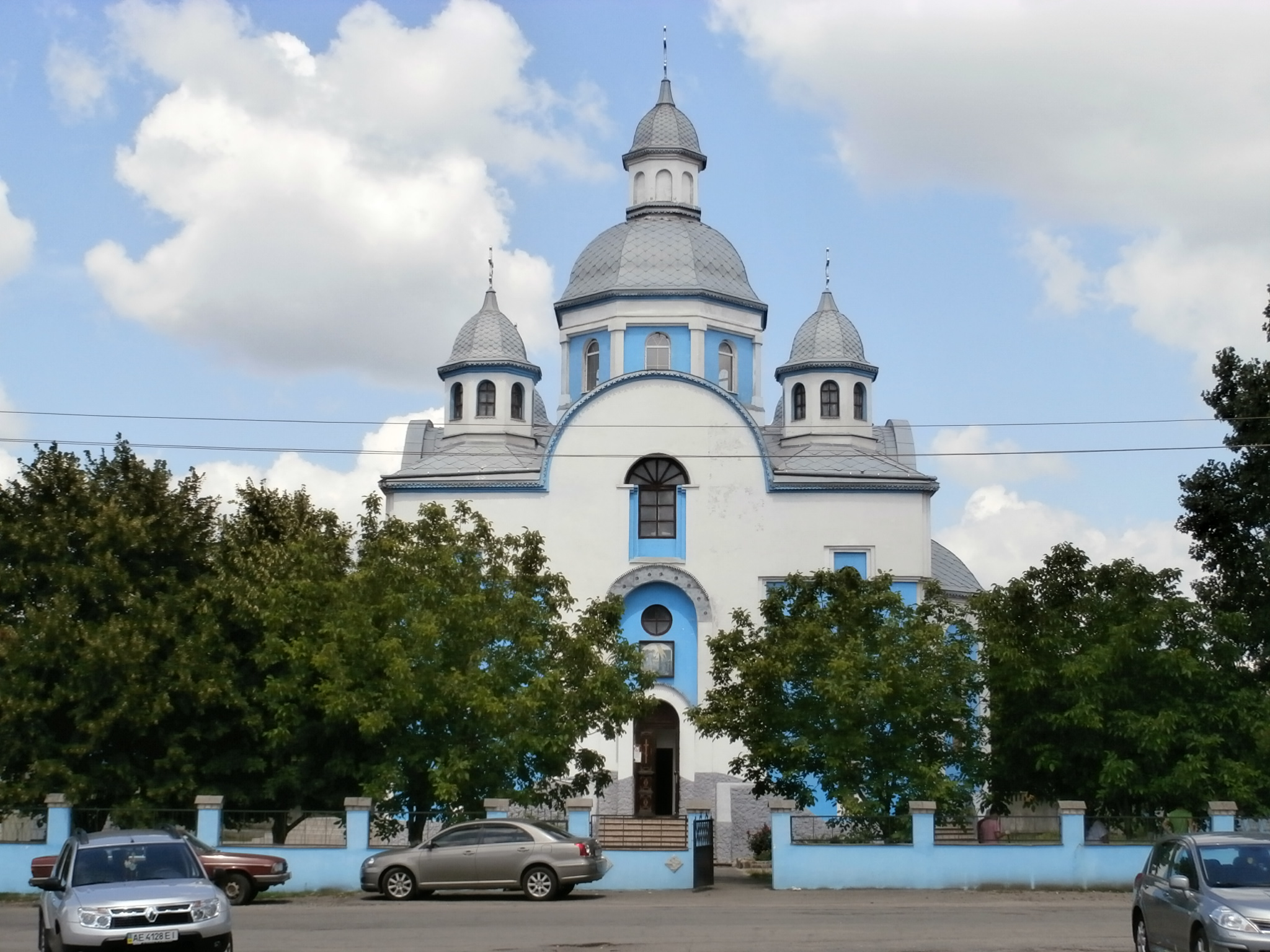
Piatykhatky church

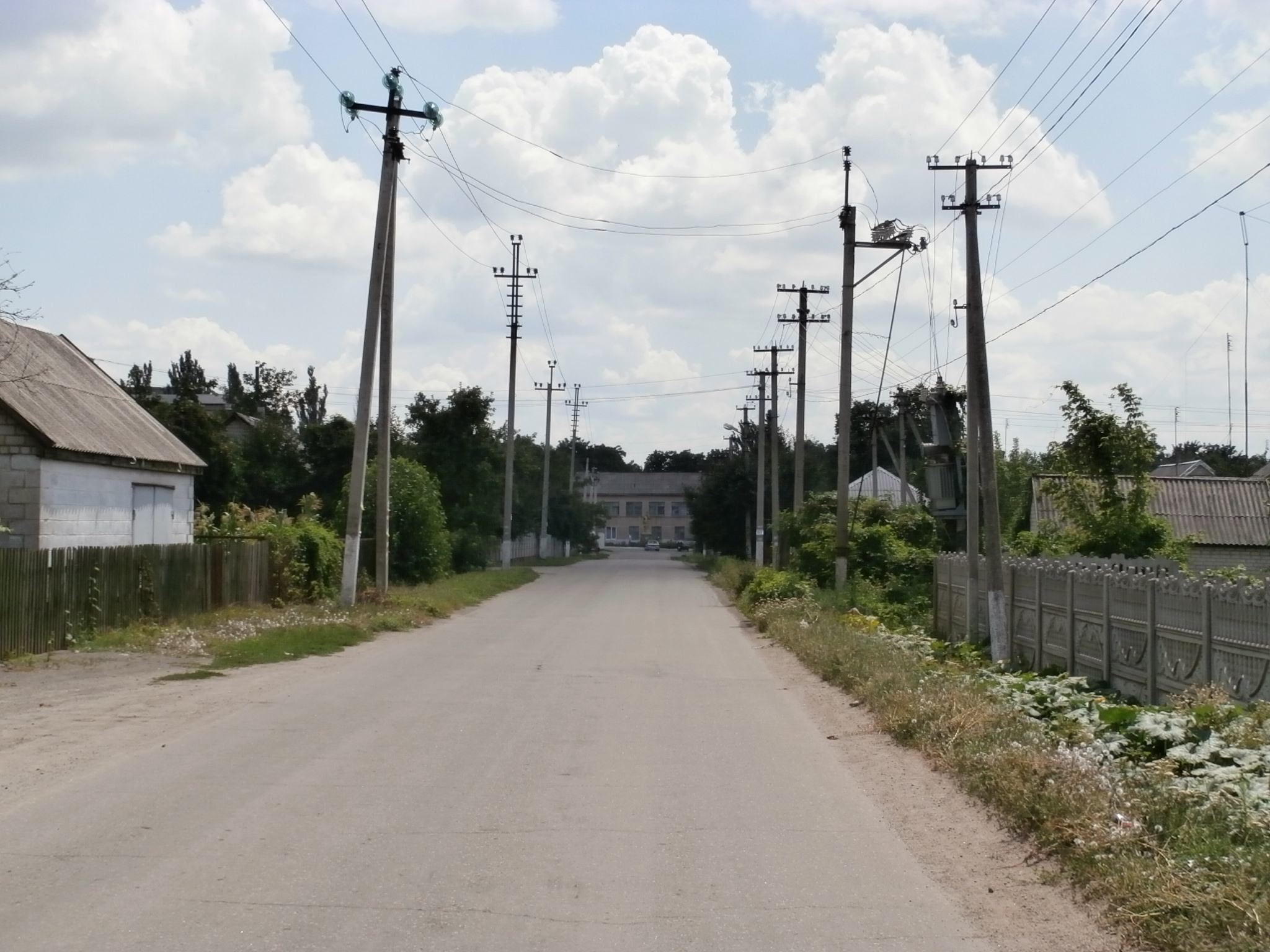
A street in Piatykhatky
