= Sursko-Mykhailivka =

Sursko-Mykhailivka Сурсько-Михайлівка
- Village
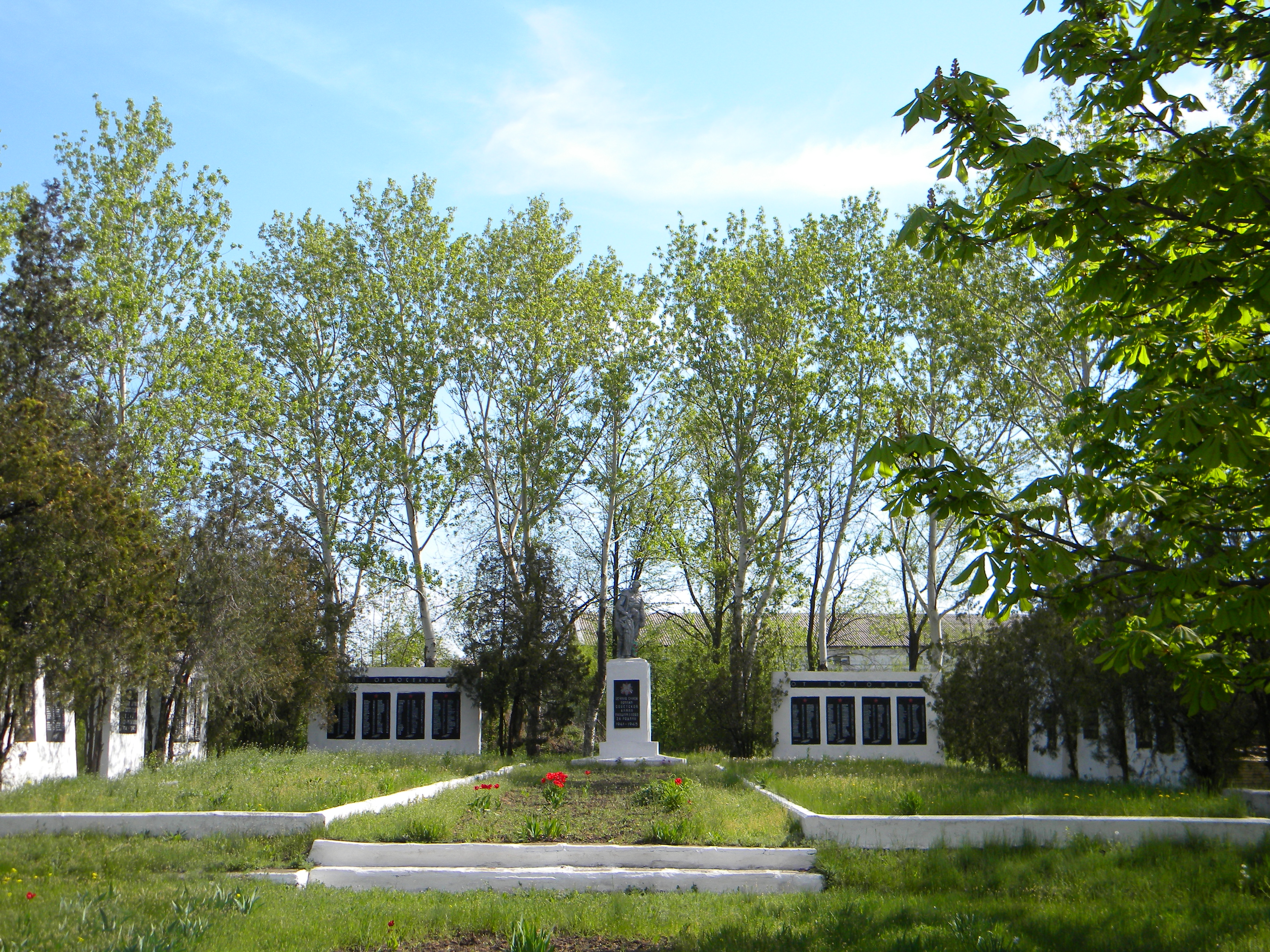
- WW2 Monument in the village

- Location within Dnipropetrovsk Oblast Location within Ukraine
- Coordinates: 48°16′17.6″N 34°43′31.0″E
- Country: Ukraine
- Oblast: Dnipropetrovsk Oblast
- Raion: Dnipro Raion
- Hromada: Solone settlement hromada

Area
  - Total: 15.9 km^{2} (6.13 sq mi)
- Elevation: 70 m (230 ft)

Population
  - Estimate (2021): 2,552
- Time zone: UTC+2 (Eastern European Time)
  - Summer (DST): UTC+3 (Eastern European Summer Time)
- Postal Code: 52411

Sursko-Mykhailivka, (Ukrainian: Сурсько-Михайлівка) is a large village in the Dnipro Raion of the Dnipropetrovsk Oblast of Ukraine.

The village is located 32 km (20 Miles) to the south-west of the city of Dnipro and 56 km (35 Miles) north-west of the city of Zaporizhzhia. It is located at 70 metres above sea level.

It has an estimated population of 2,552, as of 2021 and has a postal code of 52411. Along with the rest of Ukraine, except Russian-occupied areas, the village follows Eastern European Time (UTC+2) and Eastern European Summer Time (UTC+3) in the summer.
