= Piatykhatky urban hromada =

Piatykhatky urban hromada П'ятихатська міська громада
- Hromada
- Interactive map of Piatykhatky urban hromada
- Country: Ukraine
- Oblast: Dnipropetrovsk Oblast
- Raion: Kamianske Raion
- Admin. center: Piatykhatky

Area
  - Total: 988.6 km^{2} (381.7 sq mi)

Population (2020)
  - Total: 31,600
  - Density: 32.0/km^{2} (82.8/sq mi)
- CATOTTG code: UA12040210000039759
- Settlements: 31
- Cities: 1
- Rural settlements: 5
- Villages: 25

Piatykhatky urban territorial hromada (Ukrainian: П'ятихатська міська територіальна громада, romanized: Piatykhatska miska terytorialna hromada) is one of the hromadas of Ukraine, located in Kamianske Raion within Dnipropetrovsk Oblast. The administrative center is the city of Piatykhatky.

The area of the territory is 988.6 square kilometres (381.7 mi^{2}), the population of the hromada is 31,600 (2020).

Formed on October 25, 2020, by merging Piatykhatky City, Bohdano-Nadezhdivka, Ivashynivka, Palmyrivka, Vynohradivka, Zhovte Village and Zoria settlement Councils.

== Composition ==
In addition to one city (Piatykhatky), the hromada contains five rural settlements (Avanhard, Myrne, Vershynne, Zelene, Zoria) and 25 villages:

- Bohdano-Nadiivka
- Chystopil
- Dmytrivka
- Ivashynivka
- Kalynivka
- Kasynivka
- Krasna Volia
- Krasnyi Luh
- Kultura
- Myroliubivka
- Novovasylivka
- Novozalissia
- Osykuvate
- Palmyrivka
- Petrivka
- Poltavoboholiubivka
- Rovenky
- Sukhanivka
- Trudoliubivka
- Veselyi Podil
- Vynohradivka
- Zaporizhzhia
- Zelenyi Luh
- Zhovte
- Zhovtooleksandrivka
