= Chubarivka =

Chubarivka (Ukrainian: Чубарівка) is the former name of several settlements in Ukraine.

- Polohy, known as Chubarivka from 1928 to 1937
- Fedorivka, Polohy Raion, Zaporizhzhia Oblast, known as Chubarivka before 2016
- Hrada, Zhytomyr Oblast, known as Chubarivka before 2016
