= Vilnohirsk =

City in Dnipropetrovsk Oblast, Ukraine

Vilnohirsk Вільногірськ
- City
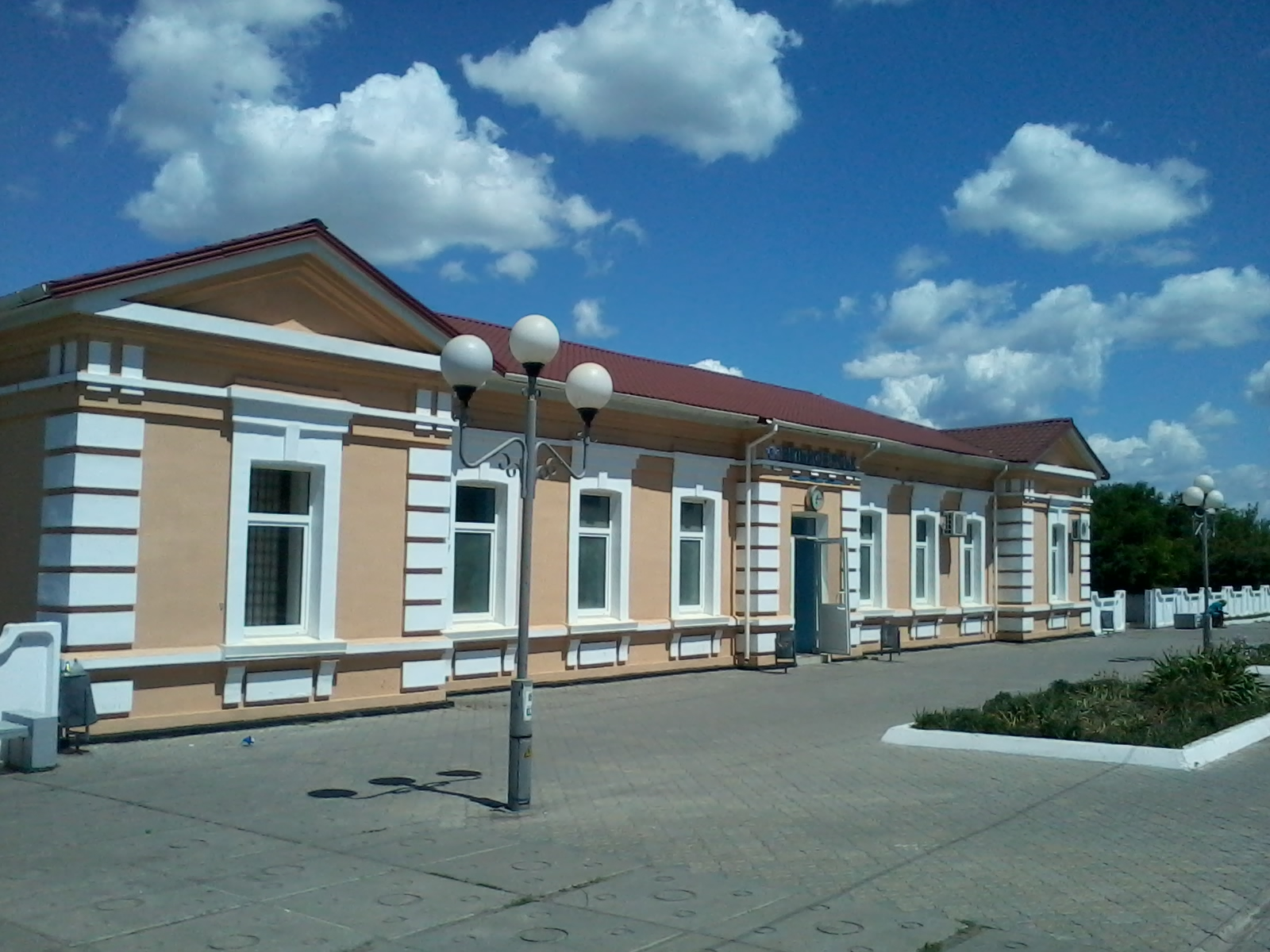
- Vilnohirsk train station

- Flag Coat of arms
- Interactive map of Vilnohirsk
- Location of Dnipro in Dnipropetrovsk Oblast Location of Dnipro in Ukraine
- Coordinates: 48°28′41″N 34°01′41″E
- Country: Ukraine
- Oblast: Dnipropetrovsk Oblast
- Raion: Kamianske Raion
- Hromada: Vilnohirsk urban hromada
- Established: August 12, 1956

Area
  - Total: 10 km^{2} (3.9 sq mi)

Population (2022)
  - Total: 22,079
- Website: http://vilnogirsk.dp.ua/

Vilnohirsk (Ukrainian: Вільногірськ, IPA: [wilʲnoˈɦirʲsʲk]) is a city in Kamianske Raion, Dnipropetrovsk Oblast, Ukraine. It hosts the administration of Vilnohirsk urban hromada, one of the hromadas of Ukraine. In 2024, 19,017 people were officially registered in Vilnohirsk.

Vilnohirsk is (with Irshansk) the centre of the Ukrainian titanium ore industry.

Until 18 July 2020, Vilnohirsk was designated as a city of oblast significance and did not belong to any raion. As part of the administrative reform of Ukraine, which reduced the number of raions of Dnipropetrovsk Oblast to seven, the city was merged into newly established Kamianske Raion.

== Demographics ==
As of the 2001 Ukrainian census, Vilnohirsk had a population of 24,080 inhabitants. In terms of ethnicities, besides a very large Ukrainian majority, a significant minority of people of Russian descent also exists in the city. In terms of spoken languages, the Ukrainian language is dominant in the city, yet every fifth person claims to be a native Russian speaker. The exact ethnic and linguistic composition of the population at the time of the census was as follows:

Ethnic groups in Vilnohirsk
	percent
Ukrainians	85.82%
Russians	12.66%
Belarusians	0.84%
Georgians	0.12%
Armenians	0.10%
Germans	0.09%
others	0.37%

Languages in Vilnohirsk
	percent
Ukrainian	81.4%
Russian	18.3%
Belarusian	0.2%
others	0.1%
