= Verkhivtseve =

Town in Dnipropetrovsk Oblast, Ukraine

Verkhivtseve Верхівцеве
- City
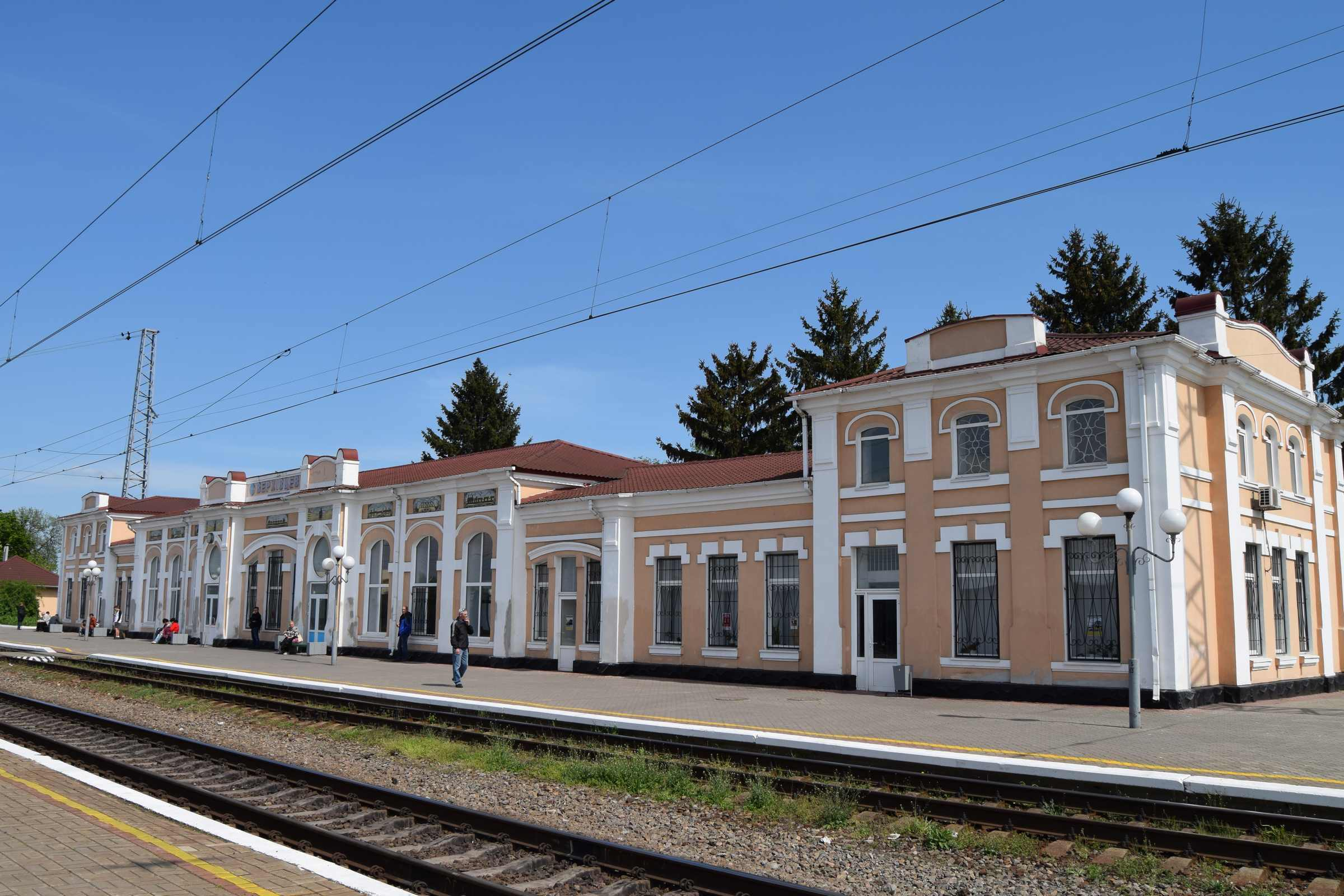
- Verkhivtseve train station

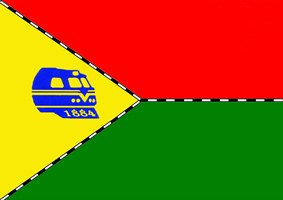
- Flag Coat of arms
- Interactive map of Verkhivtseve
- Location of Verkhivtseve Verkhivtseve (Dnipropetrovsk Oblast)
- Coordinates: 48°29′7″N 34°15′14″E
- Country: Ukraine
- Oblast: Dnipropetrovsk Oblast
- Raion: Kamianske Raion
- Hromada: Verkhivtseve urban hromada
- Established: 1884

Government
  - Mayor: Vasyl Fedorovych Zaluzhnyy

Area
  - Total: 14 km^{2} (5.4 sq mi)

Population (2001)
  - Total: 10,142
  - Density: 720/km^{2} (1,900/sq mi)
- Postal code: 51660-51662
- Area code: 5658

Verkhivtseve (Ukrainian: Верхівцеве, IPA: [werˈxiu̯tsewe]) is a city in Kamianske Raion, Dnipropetrovsk Oblast, Ukraine. Verkhivtseve hosts the administration of Verkhivtseve urban hromada, one of the hromadas of Ukraine. Population: 9,948 (2022 estimate).

In 2001, the population was 10,142. Verkhivtseve has a railway station. The area is mostly forested.

== History ==
During the Ukrainian War of Independence, from 1917 to 1920, it passed between various factions. Afterwards it was administratively part of the Katerynoslav Governorate of Ukraine.

The settlement of Verkhivtseve got status of city in 1956.

Until 18 July 2020, Verkhivtseve belonged to Verkhnodniprovsk Raion. The raion was abolished in July 2020 as part of the administrative reform of Ukraine, which reduced the number of raions of Dnipropetrovsk Oblast to seven. The area of Verkhnodniprovsk Raion was merged into Kamianske Raion.

== Demographics ==
Ethnic composition of the town as of 2001:

Ethnic groups in Verkhivtseve
	percent
Ukrainians	87.95%
Russians	9.90%
Belarusians	0.56%
Armenians	0.34%
Moldovans	0.22%
Gypsies	0.22%
Azerbaijanis	0.13%
Germans	0.12%
