= Kamianske Raion =

Subdivision of Dnipropetrovsk Oblast, Ukraine

Kamianske Raion Кам'янський район
- Raion
- Kamianskyi raion
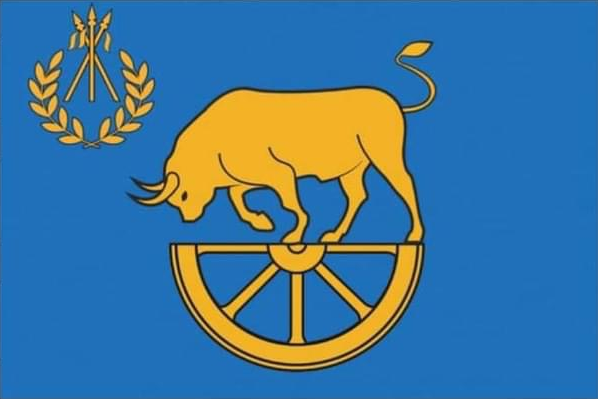
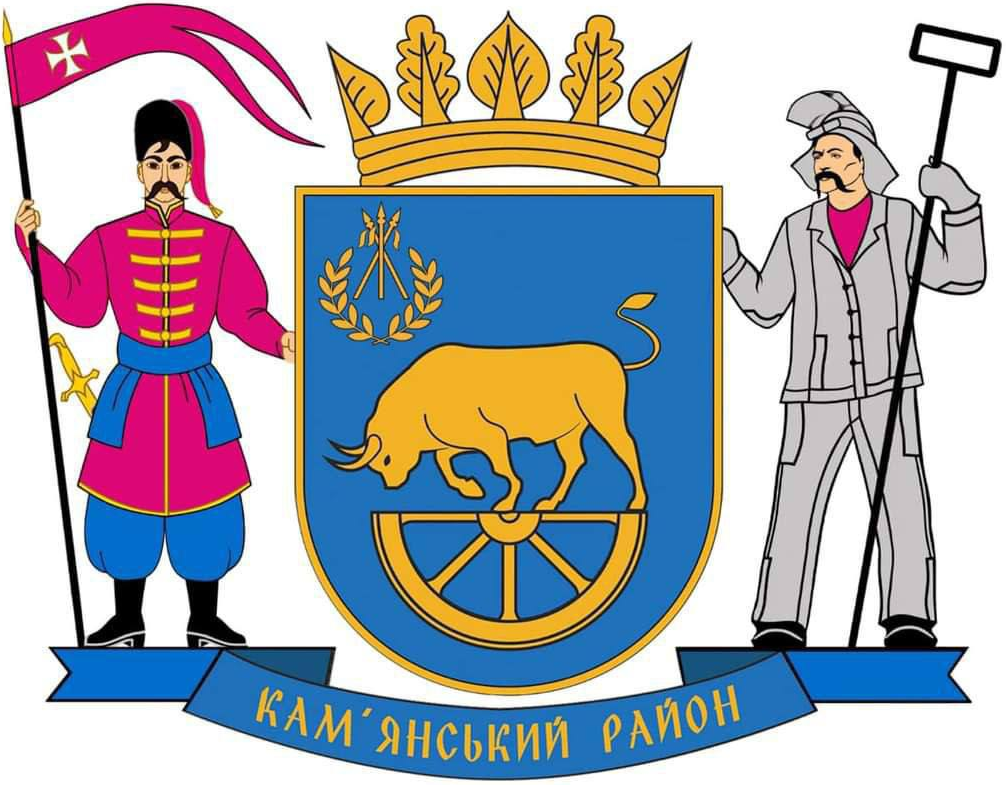
- Flag Coat of arms

- Country: Ukraine
- Oblast: Dnipropetrovsk Oblast
- Established: 2020
- Admin. center: Kamianske
- Subdivisions: 12 hromadas

Area
  - Total: 4,821.2 km^{2} (1,861.5 sq mi)

Population (2022)
  - Total: 423,443
  - Density: 87.829/km^{2} (227.48/sq mi)
- Time zone: UTC+02:00 (EET)
  - Summer (DST): UTC+03:00 (EEST)

Kamianske Raion (Ukrainian: Кам'янський район) is a raion (district) of Dnipropetrovsk Oblast, Ukraine. It was created in July 2020 as part of the reform of administrative divisions of Ukraine. Three abolished raions, Krynychky, Piatykhatky, and Verkhnodniprovsk Raions, as well as Kamianske Municipality, Zhovti Vody Municipality, and the city of Vilnohirsk, which was previously incorporated as a city of oblast significance, were merged into Kamianske Raion. The administrative center of the raion is the city of Kamianske. Population: 423,443 (2022 estimate).

== Subdivisions ==
At the time of establishment, the raion consisted of 12 hromadas:

- Bozhedarivka settlement hromada with the administration in the rural settlement of Bozhedarivka, transferred from Krynychky Raion;
- Kamianske urban hromada with the administration in the city of Kamianske, transferred from Kamianske Municipality;
- Krynychky settlement hromada with the administration in the rural settlement of Krynychky, transferred from Krynychky Raion;
- Lykhivka settlement hromada with the administration in the rural settlement of Lykhivka, transferred from Piatykhatky Raion;
- Piatykhatky urban hromada with the administration in the city of Piatykhatky, transferred from Piatykhatky Raion;
- Saksahan rural hromada, with the administration in the selo of Saksahan, transferred from Piatykhatky Raion;
- Verkhivtseve urban hromada with the administration in the city of Verkhivtseve, transferred from Verkhnodniprovsk Raion;
- Verkhnodniprovsk urban hromada with the administration in the city of Verkhnodniprovsk, transferred from Verkhnodniprovsk Raion;
- Vilnohirsk urban hromada with the administration in the city of Vilnohirsk, transferred from the city of oblast significance of Vilnohirsk;
- Vyshneve settlement hromada with the administration in the rural settlement of Vyshneve, transferred from Piatykhatky Raion;
- Zatyshne rural hromada with the administration in the selo of Zatyshne, transferred from Krynychky Raion;
- Zhovti Vody urban hromada with the administration in the city of Zhovti Vody, transferred from Zhovti Vody Municipality.
