= Oleksandrivka, Slobozhanske settlement hromada, Dnipro Raion, Dnipropetrovsk Oblast =

Oleksandrivka Олександрівка Billerveld
- Village
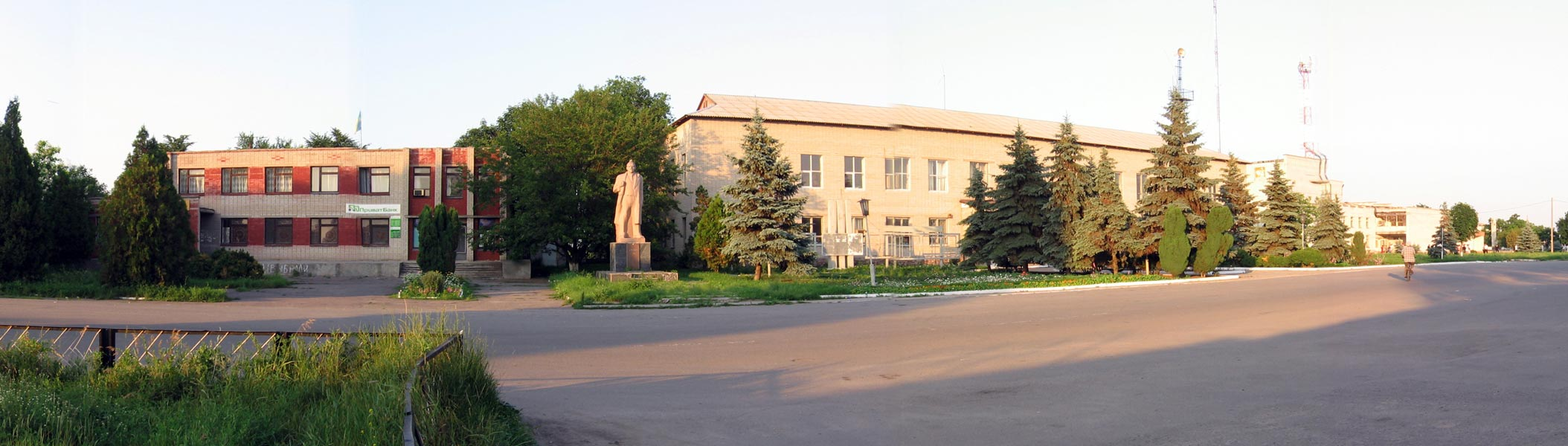

- Location within Ukraine Location within Dnipropetrovsk Oblast
- Coordinates: 48°30′50″N 35°13′53″E
- Country: Ukraine
- Oblast: Dnipropetrovsk Oblast
- Raion: Dnipro Raion
- Hromada: Slobozhanske settlement hromada
- Established: 1861
- Council: Slobozhanske Settlement Council

Government
  - Starosta: Victoria Akimova

Area
  - Total: 3.184 km^{2} (1.229 sq mi)

Population (2021)
  - Total: 2,318
  - Density: 728.0/km^{2} (1,886/sq mi)
- Time zone: UTC+2
  - Summer (DST): UTC+3 (EEST)
- Postal code: 52041
- Website: slobozhanska-gromada.gov.ua

Oleksandrivka (Ukrainian: Олександрівка) is a village in Dnipro Raion Dnipropetrovsk Oblast Ukraine. The village is part of Slobozhanske settlement hromada.

== Geography ==
Oleksandrivka is located on the left bank of the Samara River. Dnipropetrovsk State Fish Farm are adjacent to the rural upstream, and the city of Dnipro is 1 km downstream. At village also located Tatarka River.

== History ==
Village was founded in 1861 as the German colony of Billerfeld (German: Billerveld). In 1886, Billerfeld had 379 residents, 49 yards, a prayer house, a school, and a carpentry workshop. The colony was part of the Josefstal volost of the Novomoskovsk district. In 1925, there were 79 yards in which 616 men and women lived. In 1926, it was renamed to its current name. In 1959, the city of Igren (currently part of city Dnipro) was formed, which included the village of Oleksandrivka.

On May 20, 1970, Oleksandrivka was classified as a village, and at the same time, the Oleksandrivka Village Council was formed. As of 1989, the population of Oleksandrivka was approximately 2 400 people.

In 2020 Oleksandrivka Village Council was subordinated to Slobozhanske Settlement Council, after this village became part of the Slobozhanske settlement hromada.

== Economics of village ==
- Educational Department of the Dnipro State Agrarian and Economic University .
- Dnipropetrovsk Research Station of the Institute of Vegetable and Melon Growing of the National Academy of Sciences.

== Transport and Road infrastructure of village ==
From the center of city Dnipro to the village of Oleksandrivka, shuttle bus No. 201. Highway T 0402 runs near the village.

The Ksenivka passenger stop is located 7 km from the village, where suburban electric trains in the direction Dnipro and Synelnykove stop.

== Education and culture of village ==
- Oleksandrivka liceum
- House of culture, library of village Oleksandrivka.
- Church of the Resurrection of Christ Orthodox Church of Ukraine

== Attractions of village ==
Samara River, Samara Bay, Lake Velykyi (Big) Lyman, Tatarka River, Pavlivskyi Forest, islands and bays. Closer to the northern outskirts of the village, between the horticultural society "Perlyna" and the summer cooperative "Samarskyi razlyv", which are territorially part of Oleksandrivka, a beach has been arranged on Hnylokish Bay.

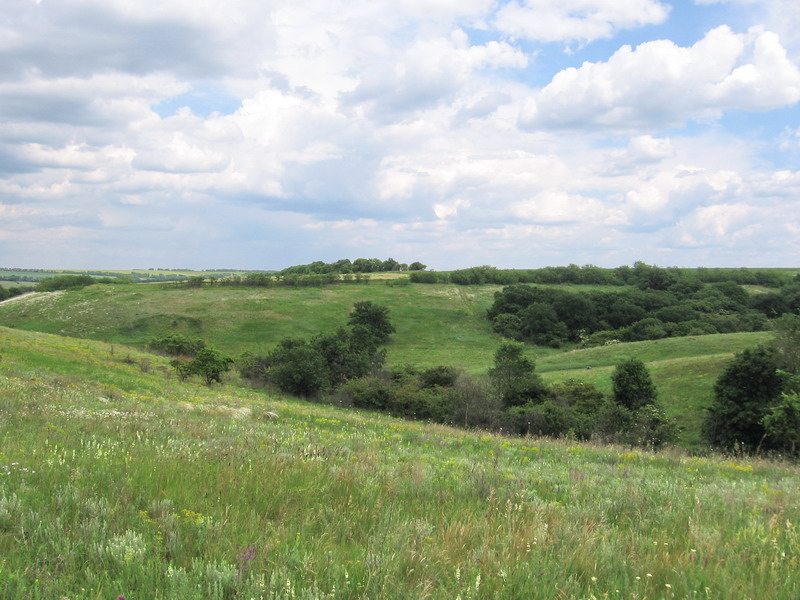
Pavlivskyi Forrest

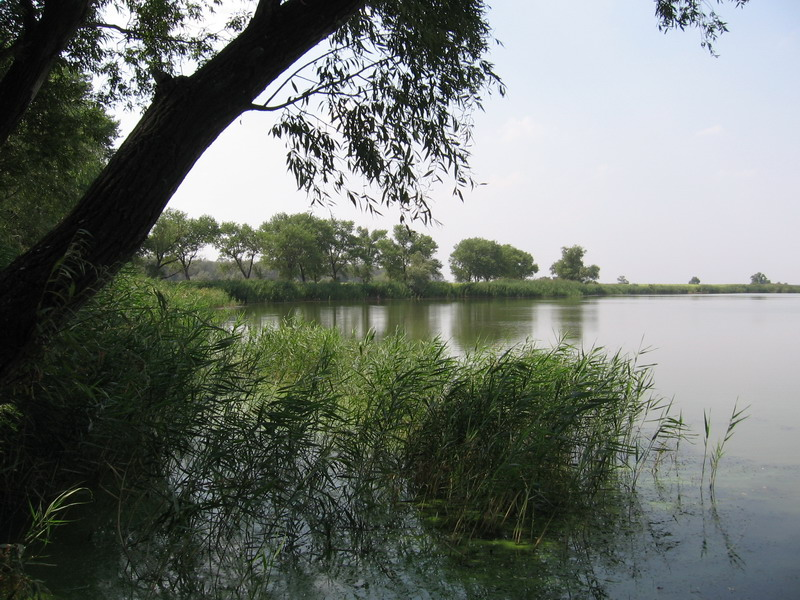
Bank of the Samara river

== Gallery ==
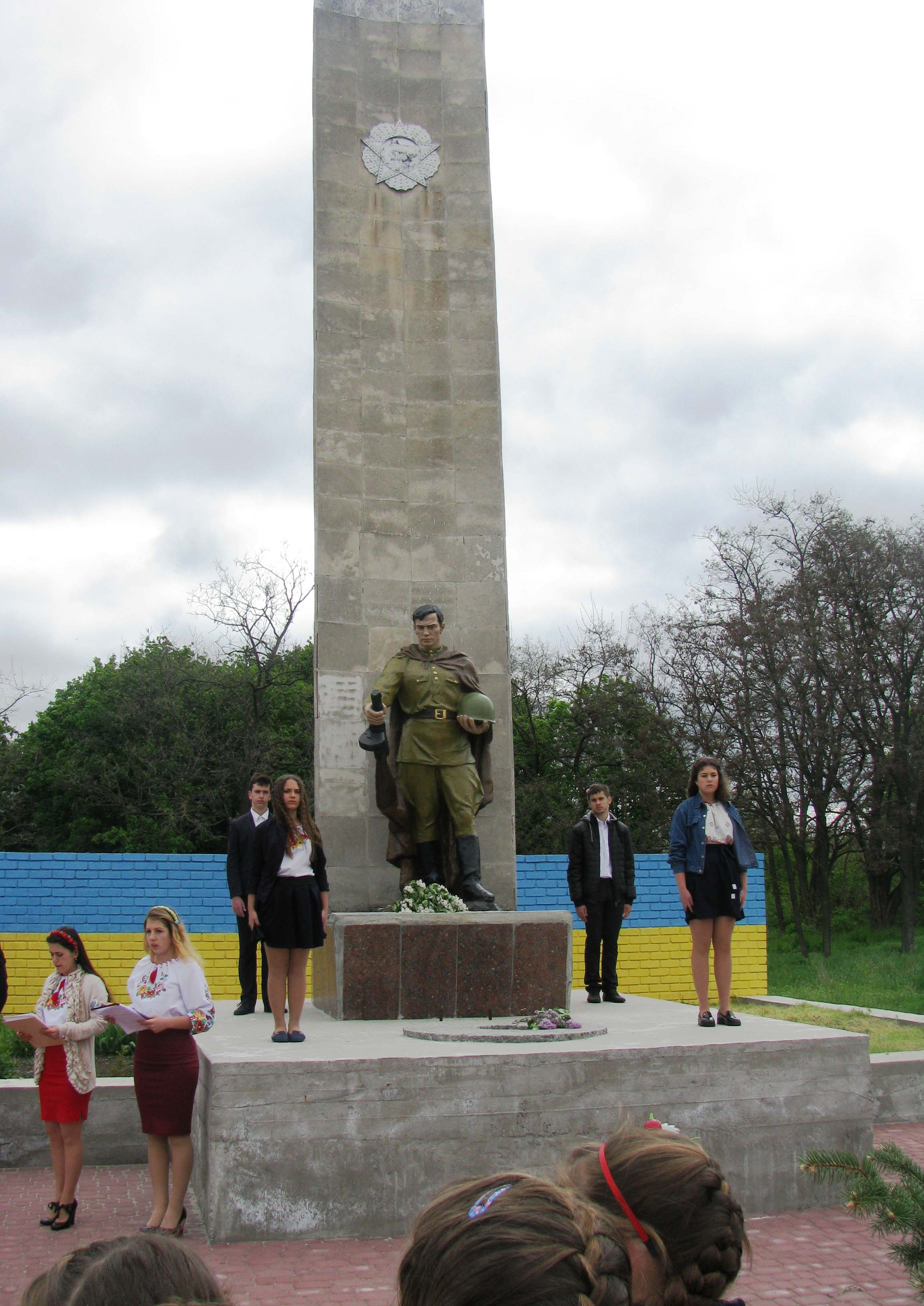
Monument to soldiers

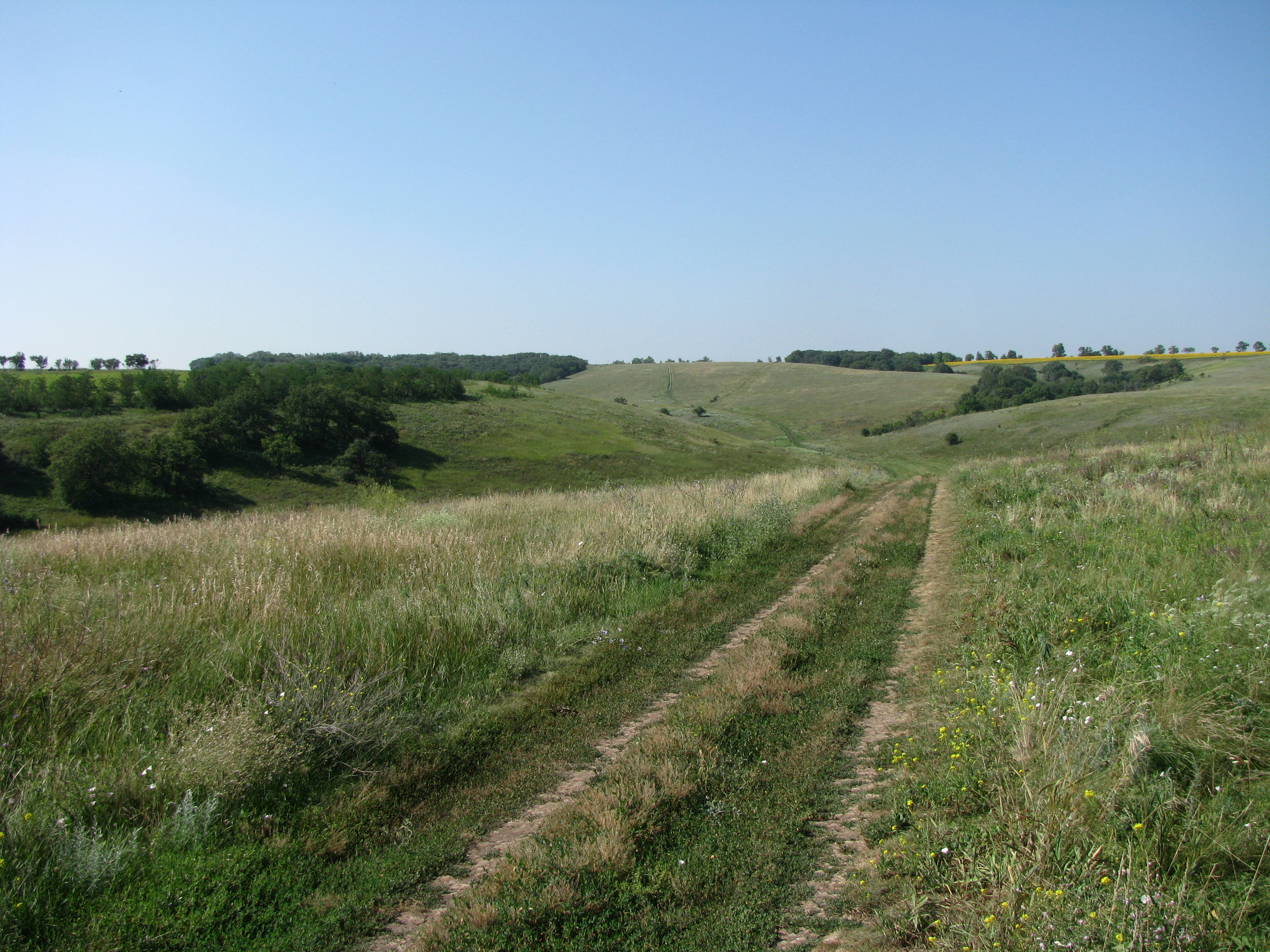
Pavlivskyi banner forest

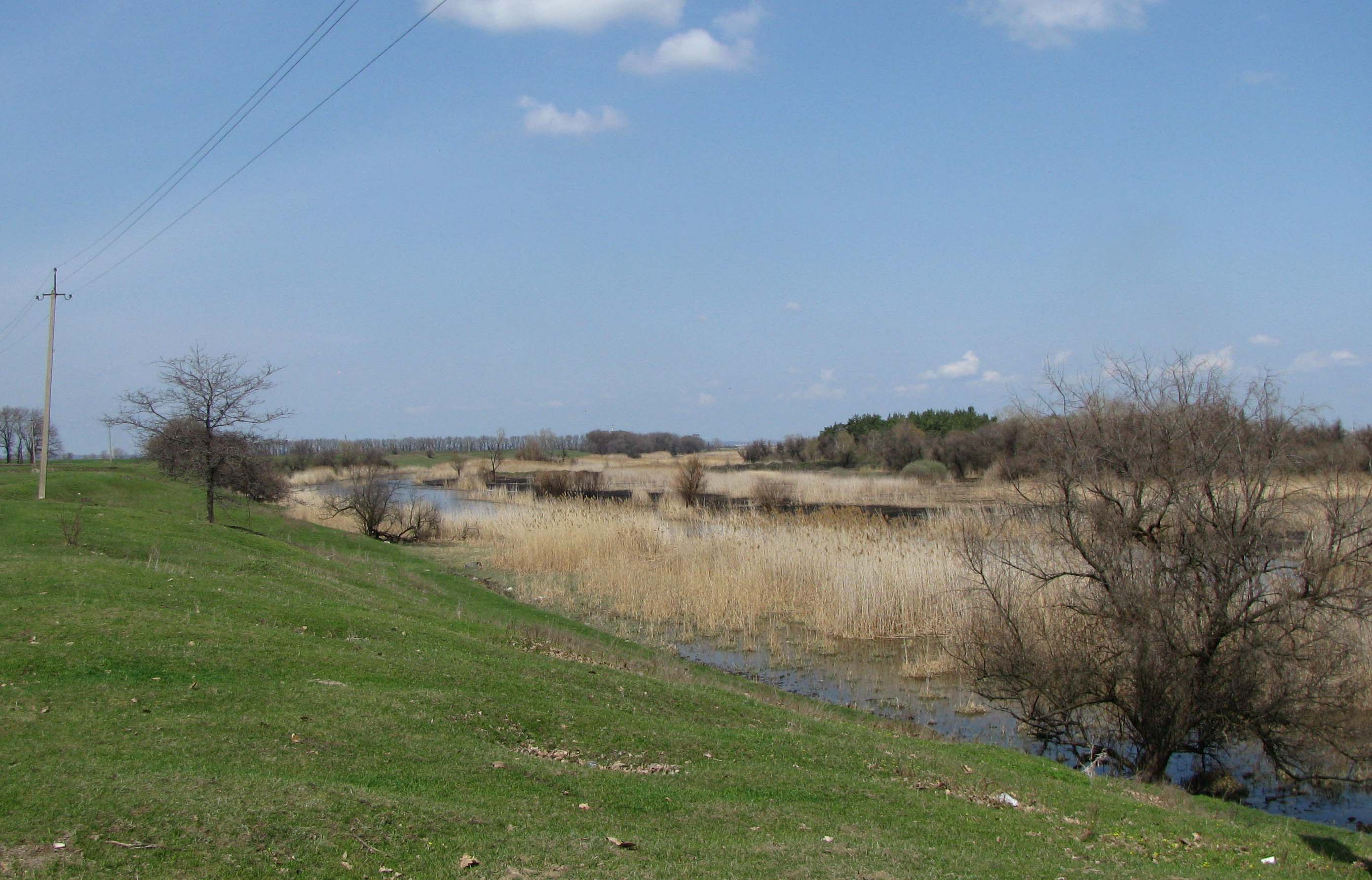
Tatarka river

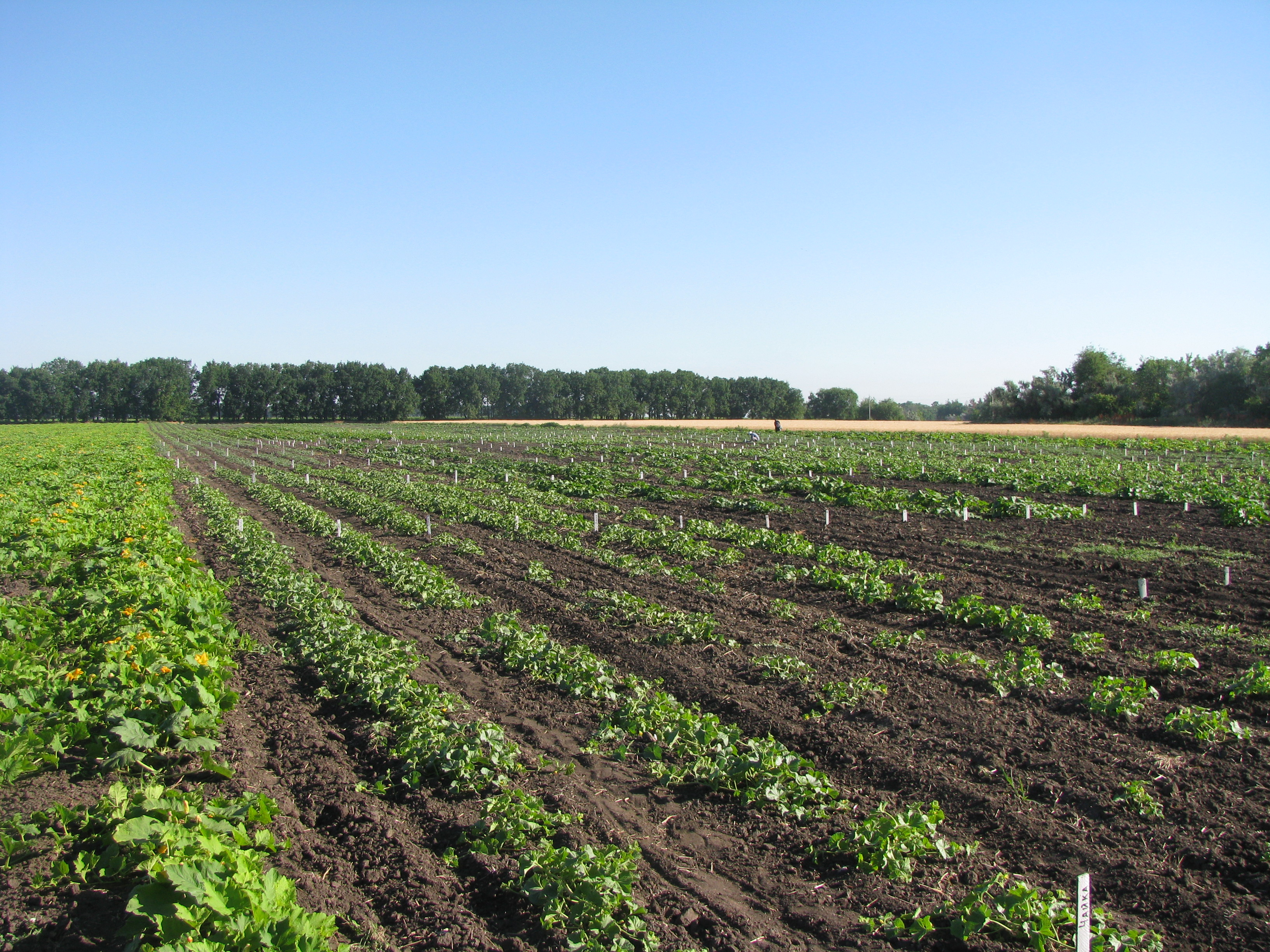
Dnipropetrovsk research station
