= Slobozhanske =

Slobozhanske is a Ukrainian toponym related to Sloboda Ukraine.

It may refer to:

- Slobozhanske, Dnipropetrovsk Oblast and Slobozhanske settlement hromada, Dnipropetrovsk Oblast around Slobozhanske, Dnipropetrovsk Oblast
- Slobozhanske, Chuhuiv Raion, Kharkiv Oblast
- Slobozhanske, Berestyn Raion, Kharkiv Oblast
