= Mykolaivka rural hromada =

Mykolaivka rural hromada (Ukrainian: Миколаївська сільська громада), an administrative division in Ukraine, may refer to:

- Mykolaivka rural hromada, Dnipro Raion, Dnipropetrovsk Oblast
- Mykolaivka rural hromada, Synelnykove Raion, Dnipropetrovsk Oblast
- Mykolaivka rural hromada, Sumy Oblast

== See also ==
- Mykolaivka urban hromada
- Mykolaivka settlement hromada
- Mykolaivka
- Novomykolaivka
