= Balivka =

Balivka (Ukrainian: Балівка) may refer to the following places in Ukraine:

- Balivka, Dnipropetrovsk Oblast, village in Dnipro Raion
- Balivka, Poltava Oblast, village in Poltava Raion
