= Balivka, Dnipropetrovsk Oblast =

Balivka Балівка
- Village
- Balivka
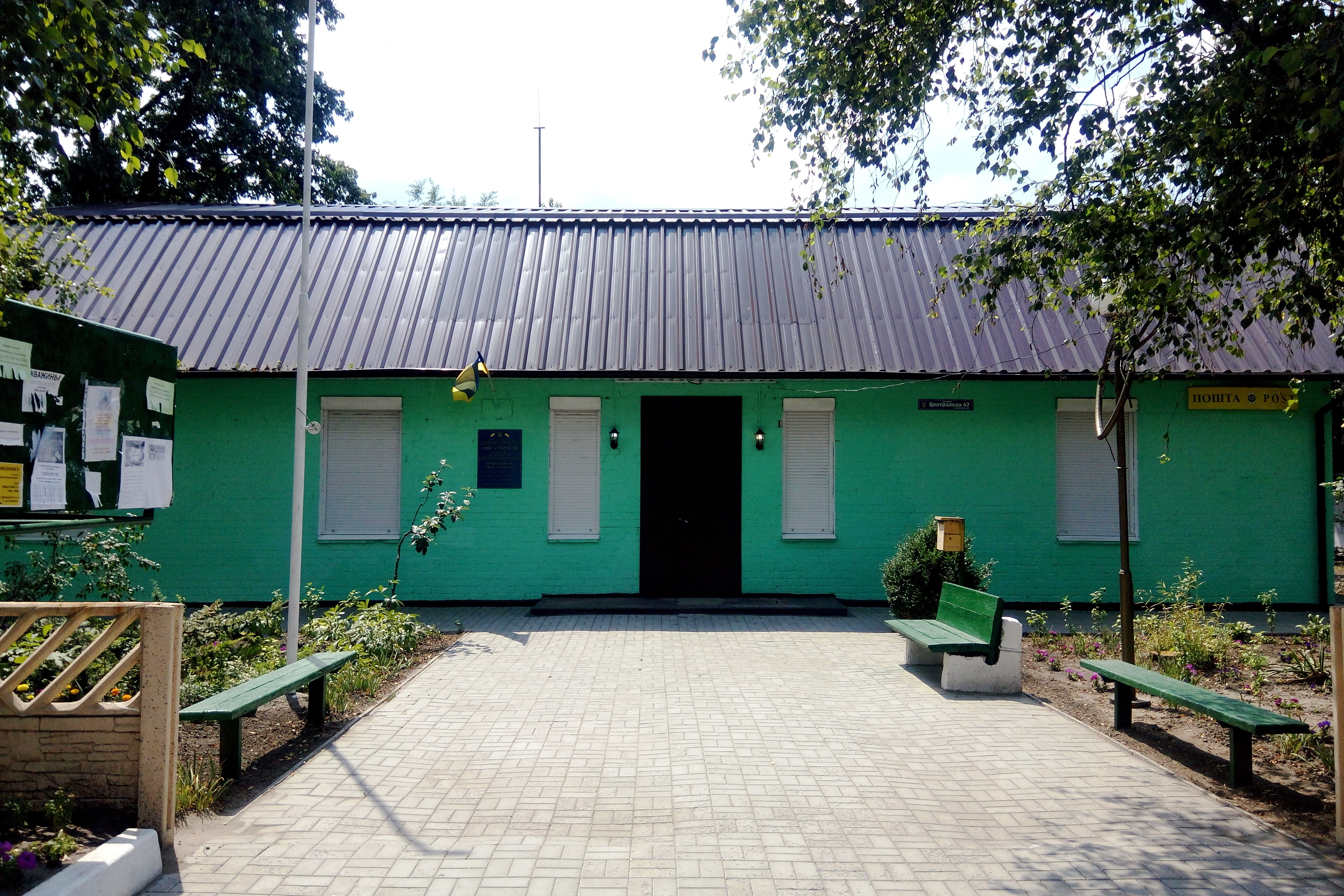
- Office of Starosta

- Location within Ukraine Location within Dnipropetrovsk Oblast
- Coordinates: 48°36′57″N 34°46′47″E
- Country: Ukraine
- Oblast: Dnipropetrovsk Oblast
- Raion: Dnipro Raion
- Hromada: Slobozhanske settlement hromada, Dnipropetrovsk Oblast
- Established: 1780
- Settlement council: Slobozhanske settlement council

Government
  - Starosta: Igor Legeza

Area
  - Total: 4.63 km^{2} (1.79 sq mi)

Population (2021)
  - Total: 2,297
  - Density: 496/km^{2} (1,280/sq mi)
- Time zone: UTC+2
  - Summer (DST): UTC+3
- Postal code: 52010
- Website: slobozhanska-gromada.gov.ua

Balivka (until 1985 - Popovo-Balivka) is a village in Ukraine, in Slobozhanske settlement hromada of the Dnipro district of the Dnipropetrovsk oblast. According to the 2021 census, the population is 2,297 people.

== Geography ==
Balivka is located in the physiographic zone of the Dniepr lowland in the northwest of the Dnipro raion, in the central part of the Dnipropetrovsk oblast. The Oril River flows to the west of Balivka. There are several lakes near the village - the remains of the old channel of the Protocha river. Near the village is the regional landscape park "Dniprovsky Forrests". The left bank of the Dnieper is 11 km south of the village. The height above sea level in the village is 55–65 meters.

In the south it borders the village of Partyzanske, in the north-eastern direction from Balivka is the village of Zorya. Highway H31 of national significance and T 0404 of territorial significance run through the village. A railway line runs 3 km from the village, on which there is a station of the same name - Balivka.

== History ==
The village was founded in the 1780s. At that time, there were two villages on the site of modern Balivka:

- Popivka (other former names were Romanivka, Secretarivka);
- Mykhailivka (on the maps of the middle of the 19th century it also had another name - Balivka).

In the 1920s, the villages were united under the common name Popovo-Balivka (until 1985). The origin of the name Popivka is most likely connected with the name of the secretary of the chancellery of Prince Grigory Potemkin, Major General V. S. Popov, to whom the surrounding lands were given as a rank dacha. The name of another village, Balivka, according to one version comes from the surname of the landowner Bala, according to another, more acceptable, from the stream that runs through the village.

During the times of the Cossacks, the adjacent lands were part of the Protovchan palanka of the Zaporizhzhya Nizovy Army. Since those times, the remains of the earthen redoubt (Maidan), which was part of the system of fortifications of the Oryol retrenchment, have been preserved on the territory of the village.

Popovo-Balivka was part of the Novomoskovsk district of the Yekaterinoslav Governorate. In 1895, the first church-parish school was opened, and in 1911, a one-class Zemstvo school.

In the 1920s and 1930s, during collectivization in the USSR, the first collective farms were created in Popovo-Balivka, which in 1950 were merged into the "Peremoga state farm".

In March 1943, several policemen of the mounted school of gendarmes from Dnipropetrovsk were sent to the village to patrol the area. In 1972, a cultural center was built, and in 1978, a new three-story building of a general secondary school was built.

In 1985, the village received the modern name of Balivka. In 2020, in the course of decentralization, the Balivske village council was merged with the Slobozhanske settlement council, which on 12 June 2020 became part of the Slobozhanske settlement hromada.

At the beginning of February 2023, after 18 years of working in Balivka as the village head and starosta Ryzhak Valeriy Petrovych resigned from his position at his own request.

According to the results of public discussions, the former director of the Balivka Lyceum of the Slobozhanke settlement council Legeza Ihor Serhiyovych became the new starosta of Balivka.

== Transport and infrastructure of village ==
Buses No.267 to the village of Balivka and No.268 to the village of Zorya run from Staromostova square on the right bank of the city Dnipro. There are also other suburban routes from the Central Bus Station in Dnipro.

Several farms operate in Balivka. The village is gasified, the roads are paved. In village works: Balivsky Lyceum, "Prolisok" children's preschool educational institution, the family doctor's clinic, and the cultural center.

== Notable people ==
- Viktor Gnoevy – politician, honored worker of agriculture of Ukraine
