= Slobozhanske settlement hromada =

Hromada of Ukraine

Slobozhanske settlement hromada Слобожанська селищна громада
- Hromada
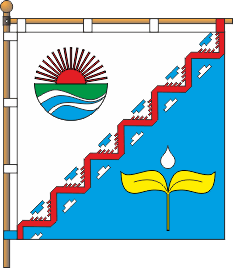
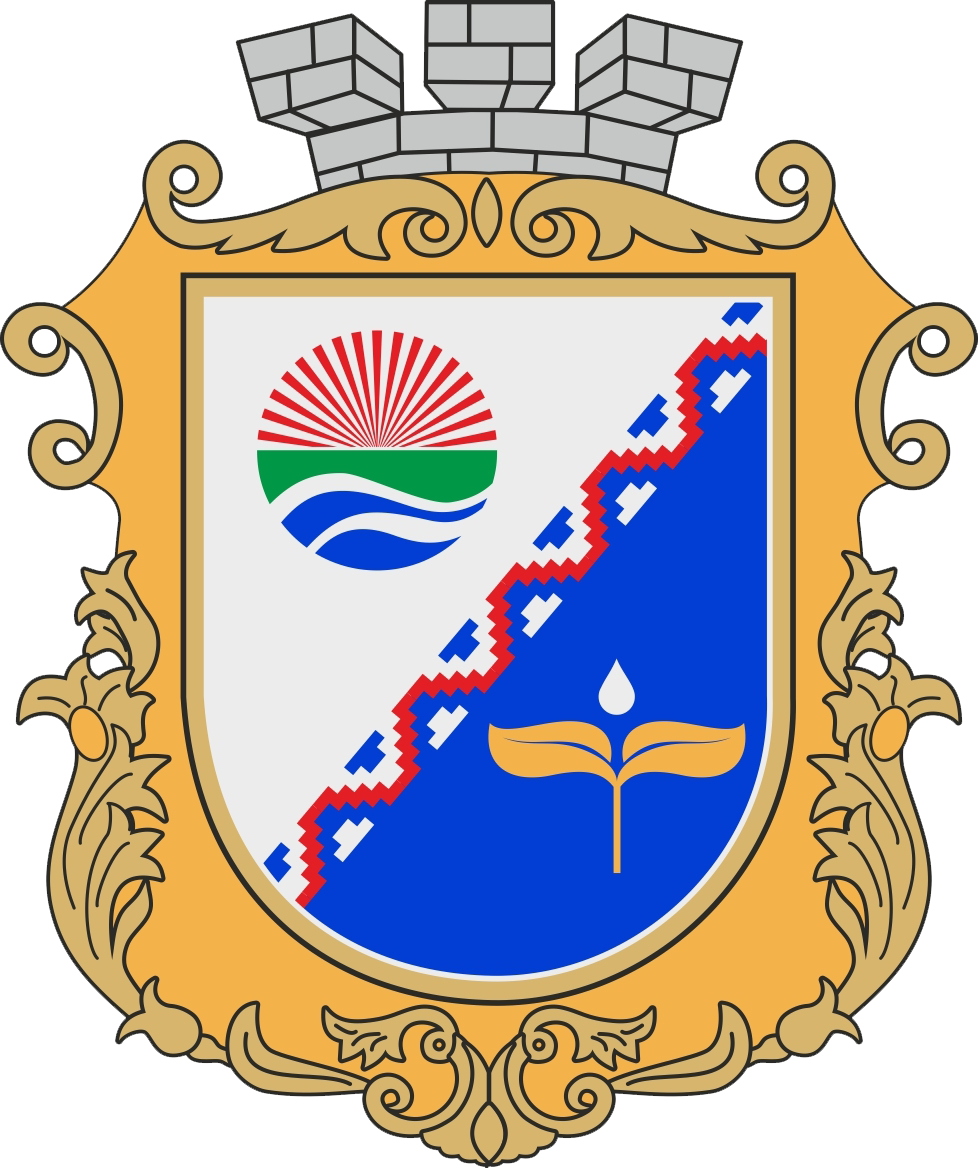
- Flag Seal

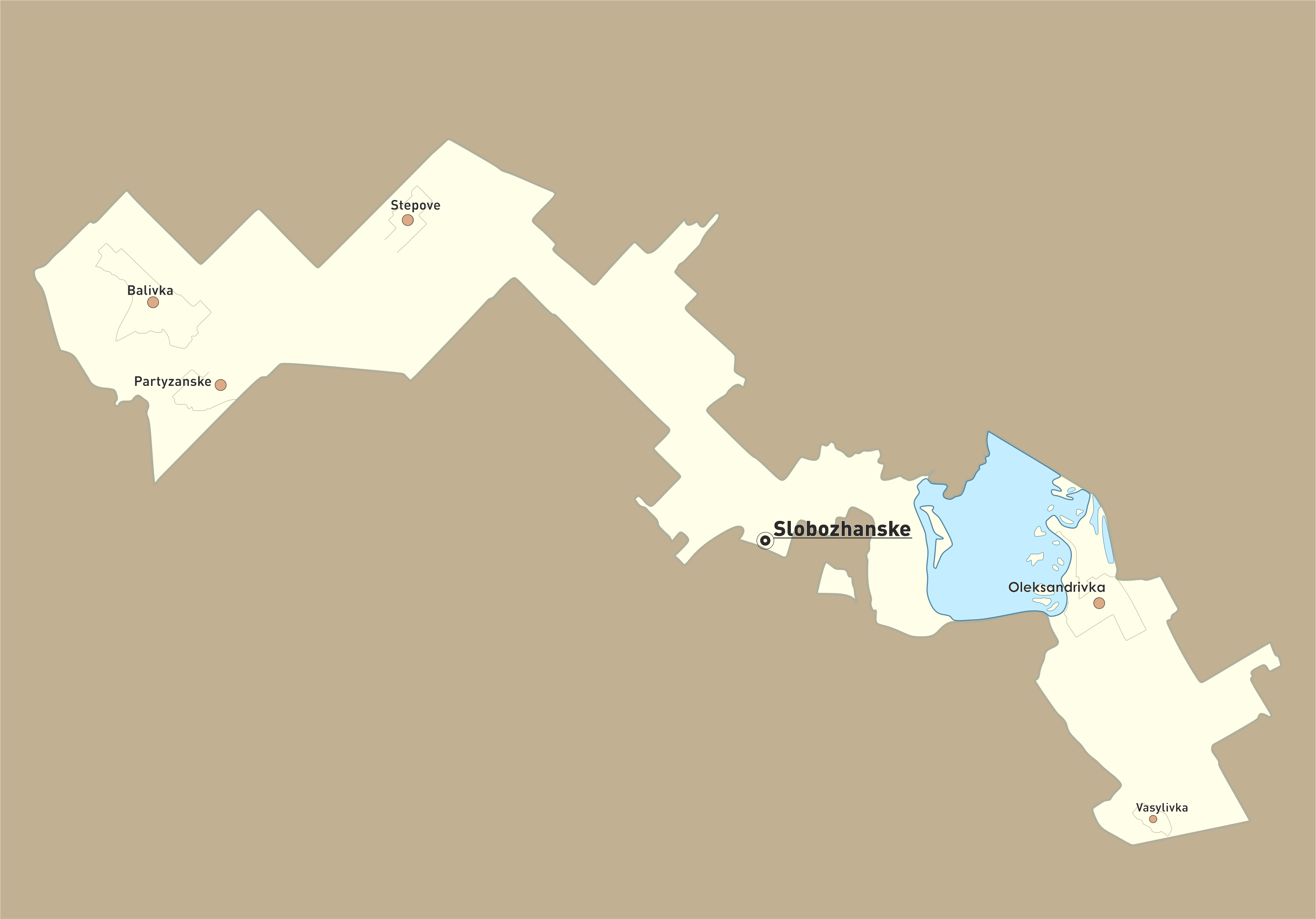
- Map of Slobozhanske settlement hromada
- Country: Ukraine
- Oblast: Dnipropetrovsk Oblast
- Raion: Dnipro Raion

Government
  - Head: Ivan Kaminskiy

Area
  - Total: 282 km^{2} (109 sq mi)

Population (2020)
  - Total: 23,191
  - Density: 82.2/km^{2} (213/sq mi)
- Settlements: 6
- Rural settlements: 1
- Villages: 5
- Website: slobozhanska-gromada.gov.ua

Slobozhanske settlement hromada (until 2016 – Yuvileine) is a hromada in Ukraine, in Dnipro Raion of Dnipropetrovsk Oblast. The administrative center is the settlement of Slobozhanske. It was formed on August 14, 2015, by merging the Yuvileine Settlement Council and the Stepove Village Council of Dnipropetrovsk Raion.

== History ==
According to the decision of the Dnipropetrovsk Oblast Council "On the formation of the Yuvileine settlement territorial hromada" in 2015, the first one in the Dnipropetrovsk region, one of the first in Ukraine, was formed. At that time, the urban-type settlement of Slobozhanske and the village of Stepove were included in the territorial hromada.

On May 12, 2016, by Resolution No. 1353-VIII of the Verkhovna Rada of Ukraine, Yuvileine was renamed the urban-type settlement of Slobozhanske, as part of decommunization in Ukraine, as it was named in honor of the 70th anniversary of the October Revolution. Because of this, the name of the hromada changed to Slobozhanske settlement hromada. Already in 2019, the deputy corps of the Slobozhanske Settlement Council initiated and adopted decisions on joining the hromada of three village councils: Oleksandrivka, Balivka, and Partyzanske.

== Settlements ==
The hromada includes one rural settlement (Slobozhanske, 13,747 inhabitants) and five villages: Oleksandrivka (2,755 inhabitants), Vasylivka (234 inhabitants), Stepove (1,385 inhabitants), Balivka (2,681 inhabitants), and Orilske (2,389 inhabitants).

Due to the law "On the Condemnation and Prohibition of Propaganda of Russian Imperial Policy in Ukraine and the Decolonization of Toponymy" (in April 2023 signed by President Volodymyr Zelenskyy) the village of Partyzanske needs to be renamed because its current name commemorates collective farm "Red Partisan", which was located on the territory of the modern village. According to law this renaming has to take place before January 27, 2024.

As part of the derussification process in Ukraine, the names of more than 110 streets, alleys and toponyms in settlements of the hromada were changed. In 2024, based on the results of a public discussion, the Slobozhanske Settlement Council submitted a proposal to rename the village of Partyzanske to Orilske. The renaming happened on 26 September 2024.

== Location ==
Slobozhanske settlement hromadas is bordered in the north by Pidhorodne, Pishchanka and Chumaky, in the east by Ilarionove, in the south by the city of Dnipro, and in the west by Obukhivka and Petrykivka hromadas.

== Educational institutions ==
There are 13 educational institutions in the hromada, of which there are 3 secondary schools, including 2 schools (grades I and II-III) in the Slobozhanske, and 1 school (grades I-III) in the Stepove, where 1940 students study. students, 3 lyceums, one each in the villages of Balivka, Orilske, and Oleksandrivka, in which 956 students study and 7 preschool educational institutions: primary school No. 1 "Chervona Shapochka", secondary school No. 2 "Berezka", secondary school No. 3 "Sonechko", primary school No. 4 "Dyvosvit", primary school "Prolisok", primary school "Ivushka", primary school "Riabinushka", which are attended by 1,072 children.

== Cultural institutions ==
There are 10 cultural institutions operating on the territory of Slobozhanske hromada, including: 4 club institutions, 1 school of aesthetic education and 5 village libraries.

Also on the territory of the hromada there is a Community Activity Center – "Youth Center "Smart", with units in each of the settlements. Youth center was created in 2019 with the aim of increasing the activity of citizens of the Slobozhanske hromada by providing the necessary knowledge and skills to ensure the sustainable development of the community.

== Sports ==
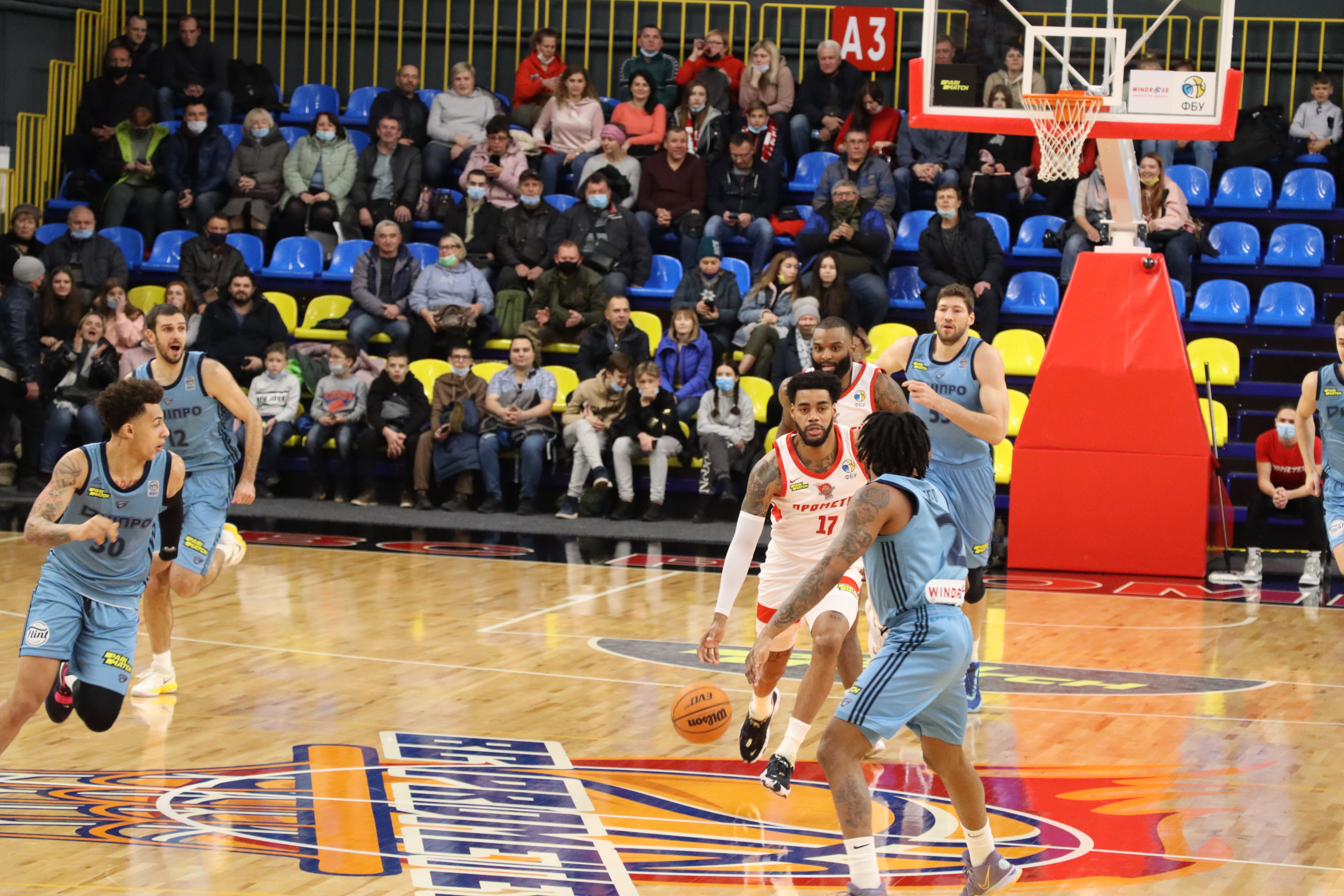
Basketball Super League game – BC "Prometey" – BC "Dnipro"

The development of sports in the hromada is carried out by the communal institution "Slobozhanske settlement center of physical health of the population "Sports for all"" established in 2012. The "Slobozhanskyi" sports complex, which was opened in 2018, operates in Slobozhanske. In 2021, the construction of a modern swimming pool on the basis of the sports complex was completed. In 2023, was established Children's and Youth Sports School of the Slobozhanske Settlement Council .

In addition, the private sports infrastructure is actively developing, namely: "Maximus" tennis club, on the territory of which there are three tennis courts, a gym, a fitness room, a swimming pool, and a children's room. There is also the "Platan" sports and development club, which houses a gym, a fitness studio, a children's club, and a dance studio.

At Slobozhanske based women's volleyball club "Prometei", the champion of Ukraine for the 2020/2021 season. Also, the champion of the Ukrainian basketball Super League of the 2020/2021 season, the men's basketball club "Prometey", performs here.

== Healthcare institutions ==
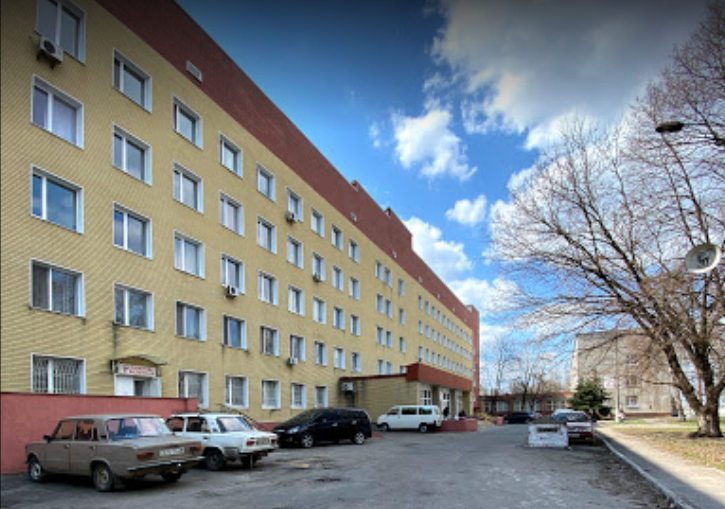
The building of the Slobozhanska Central Hospital (formerly the Dnipropetrovsk Central District Hospital)

Slobozhanske settlement hromada owns 2 health care facilities: the communal enterprise "Central Hospital of Slobozhanske" and the communal non-profit enterprise "Center for Primary Health Care".

"Central Hospital of Slobozhanske" of the Slobozhanske Settlement Council (former communal institution "Dnipropetrovsk Central District Hospital" of the Dnipropetrovsk Oblast Council) was accepted into the communal property of the Slobozhanske settlement hromada in December 2019. The hospital serves the population of 8 hromadas of Dnipro Raion of Dnipropetrovsk Oblast, namely: Slobozhanske and Obukhivka settlement hromadas, Pidhorodne urban hromada, Mykolaivka, Novooleksandrivka, Sursko-Lytovske, Chumaky and Liubymivka rural hromadas, which is more than 80,000 people. The hospital also provides medical services to part of the population of the left bank of Dnipro.

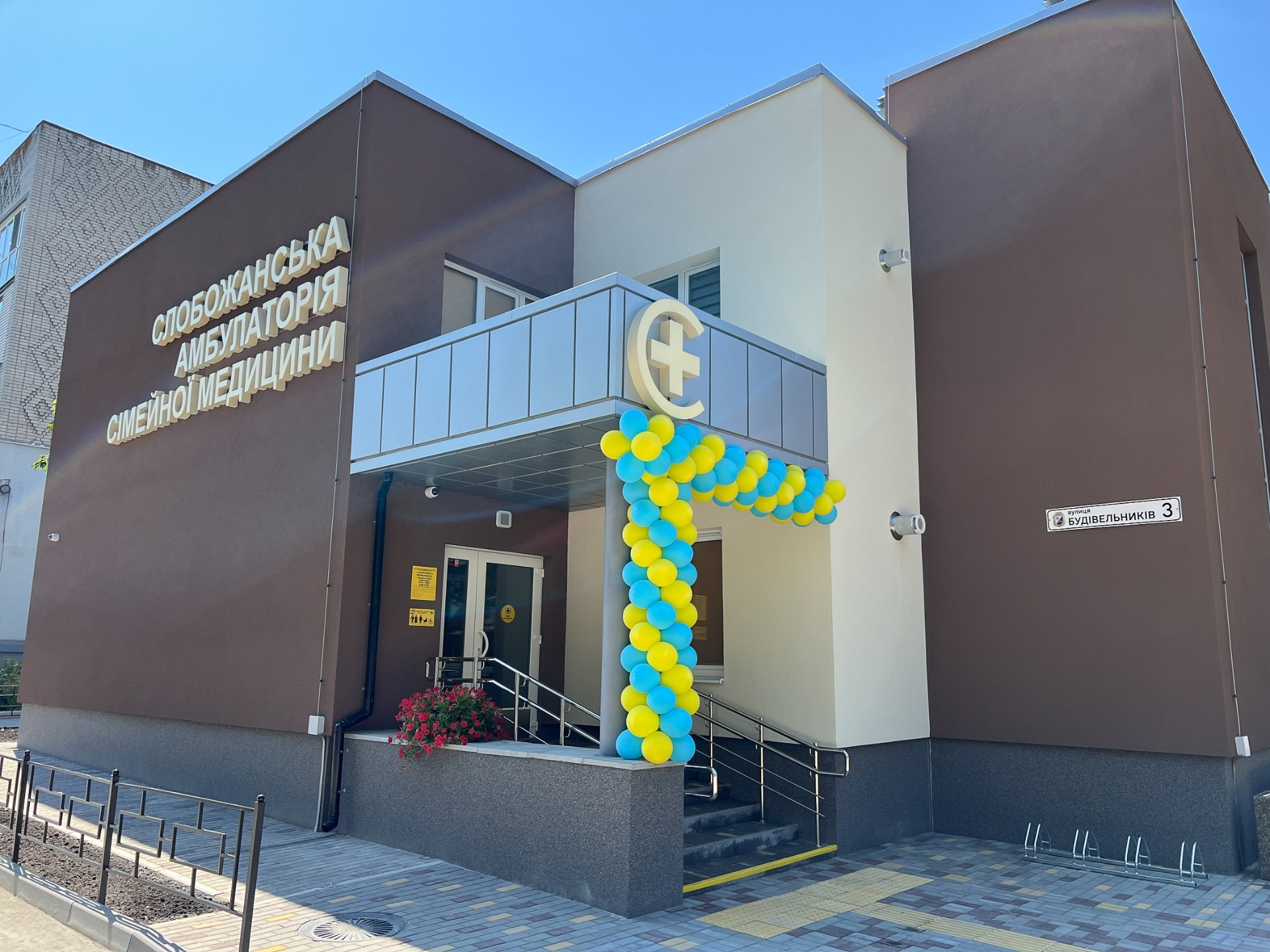
The new building of the Slobozhanska outpatient clinic of the general practice of family medicine

"Center for Primary Health Care" of the Slobozhanske Settlement Council was created by the hromada in November 2020 and began its work in February 2021, when 5 properties from the communal property of the Dnipro Raion were transferred to the "Center for Primary Health Care" of the Slobozhanske Settlement Council Outpatient Clinic of General Practice—family medicine: Slobozhanske, Stepne, Orilske, Balivka, Oleksandrivska and 2 paramedic stations: Nizhniodniprovskyi (Molodizhne) and in Vasylivka village.

In July 2024, a new building of the Slobozhanske Outpatient General Practice of Family Medicine was opened in Slobozhanske.

== Road infrastructure ==
The network of public roads provides transport connections between Slobozhanske, the city of Dnipro and other nearby settlements and hromadas. Transportation is provided by a developed network of roads:

- Of international importance – the M-30 Highway (Stryi — Ternopil — Kropyvnytskyi — Znamianka — Luhansk — Izvaryne);
- Of national importance is the H-31 Highway (Dnipro — Petrykivka — Tsarychanka — Kobeliaky — Reshetylivka), which crosses the village of Orilske and Balivka;

In addition, highway T-0402 passes through the village of Oleksandrivka (Dnipro (Ihren) — village Sokolove), highway T-0405 (Dnipro – village Khutirske) passes through the settlement of Slobozhanske and village of Stepove, in addition to the territory highway T-0404 passes through the hromada (Dnipro – Obukhivka). Transport connections ensure the accessibility of the residents of the villages to the administrative center of the hromada – Slobozhanske settlement with the help of transit buses.

== Partnerships ==
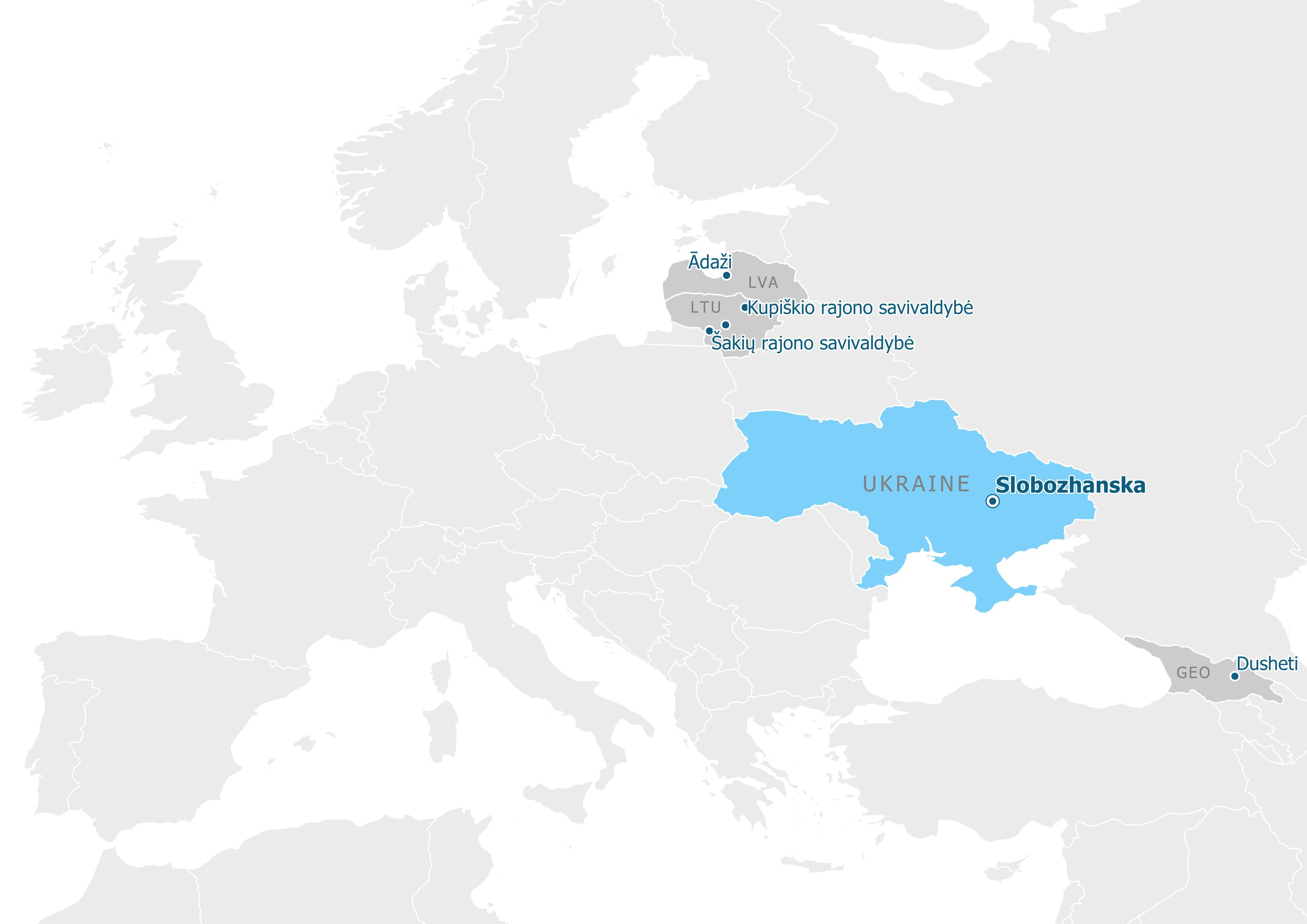
International partnership of the Slobozhanske Settlement Council

=== International partnerships ===
- (Latvia) Ādaži Municipality
- (Georgia (country)) Dusheti Municipality
- (Lithuania) Šakiai District Municipality
- (Lithuania) Kupiškis District Municipality

=== Ukrainian partnerships ===
- (Ukraine) Shyroke Village Council
- (Ukraine) Polohy City Council
- (Ukraine) Novoselytsia City Council
- (Ukraine) Manevychi Settlement Council
- (Ukraine) Khotyn City Council
- (Ukraine) Avanhard Village Council
- (Ukraine) Korosten City Council

== Social networks ==
- Instagram – https://www.instagram.com/slobozhanskagromada/
- Telegram – https://t.me/slobozhanskagromada
- Facebook – https://www.facebook.com/slobozhanskagromada/
- YouTube – https://www.youtube.com/@slobozhanskagromada

== Sources ==
- Decision of the Dnipropetrovsk Regional Council of August 14, 2015, No. 671-33/VI "On the Formation of the Yuvileyne Settlement Territorial Community of the Dnipropetrovsk District of the Dnipropetrovsk Region"
- Decision of the Dnipropetrovsk Regional Council of May 27, 2015, No. 641-31/VI "On the Prospective Plan for the Formation of Community Territories of the Dnipropetrovsk Region"
- Resolution of the Verkhovna Rada of Ukraine in the Dnipropetrovsk region of July 17, 2020, No. 807-IX "Inclusion of the territories of the Balivska, Oleksandrivska, and Partizan village councils into the Slobozhan settlement territorial community of the Dnipro district."
