= Solone =

Rural locality in Dnipropetrovsk Oblast, Ukraine

Solone Солоне
- Rural settlement
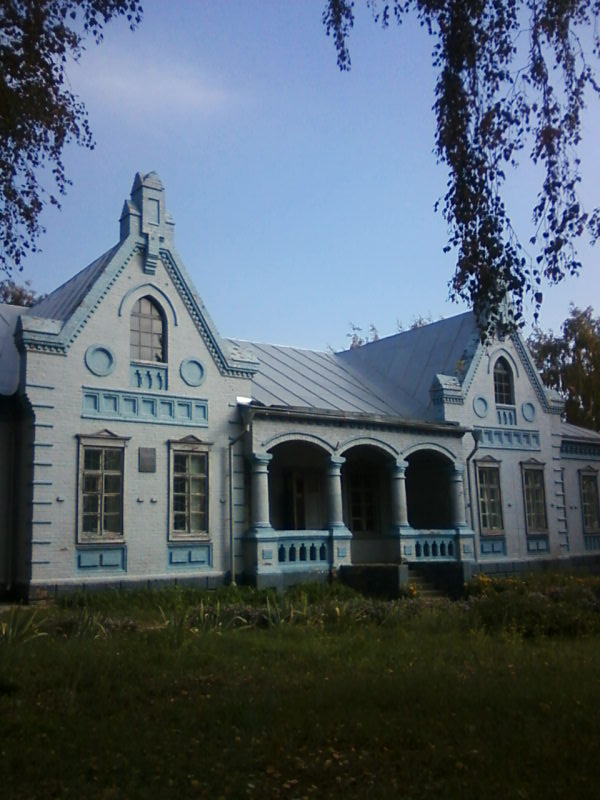

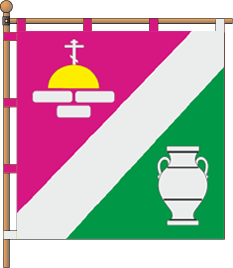
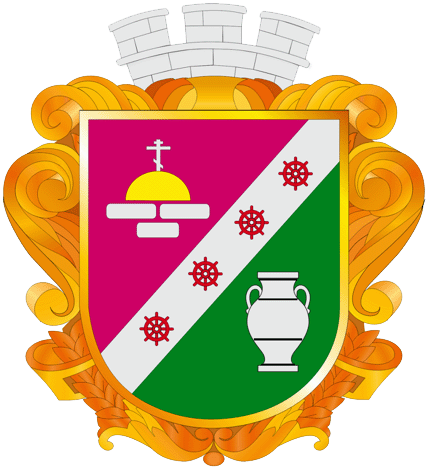
- Flag Seal

- Location within Ukraine Location within Dnipropetrovsk Oblast
- Coordinates: 48°12′00″N 34°51′45″E
- Country: Ukraine
- Oblast: Dnipropetrovsk Oblast
- Raion: Dnipro Raion

Population (2022)
  - Total: 7,380
- Time zone: UTC+2 (EET)
  - Summer (DST): UTC+3 (EEST)

Solone (Ukrainian: Солоне; Russian: Солёное, romanized: Solyonoye) is a rural settlement in Dnipro Raion, Dnipropetrovsk Oblast, Ukraine. It hosts the administration of Solone settlement hromada, one of the hromadas of Ukraine. Population: 7,380 (2022 estimate).

== History ==
Solone is located on both banks of the Solonenka River, a right tributary of the Mokra Sura River, itself a right tributary of the Dnieper.

In 1803 the Sts. Peter and Paul Church was built in Solonenke as the village was then called.

In 1889 Tsar Alexander III promulgated the Land Captain (Zemstvo chief) Statute of 1889, abolishing the old position of justice of the peace. As a result, Yekaterinoslav Governorate was divided into 7 precincts. The 3rd precinct included the following areas: Surske, Lotsman-Kamyansk, Voloske, Solone, Mykilske, and Yamburg.

In 1937, the Soviet government had built a grandiose theater in Solone, which was destroyed during the retreat of the German army in 1943.

In August 1941, the NKVD created a Solone partisan detachment (commander Volobuev) which existed until November 1941.

Until 18 July 2020, Solone was the administrative center of Solone Raion. The raion was abolished in July 2020 as part of the administrative reform of Ukraine, which reduced the number of raions of Dnipropetrovsk Oblast to seven. The area of Solone Raion was merged into Dnipro Raion.

Until 26 January 2024, Solone was designated urban-type settlement. On this day, a new law entered into force which abolished this status, and Solone became a rural settlement.

== Economy ==
=== Transportation ===
Solone has access to the Highway M04 connecting Dnipro with Kryvyi Rih, as well as to the Highway H08 connecting Dnipro with Zaporizhzhia.

The closest railway station is in the village of Nadiivka, on the railway connecting Dnipro and Apostolove.
