= Aviatorske =

Rural locality in Dnipropetrovsk Oblast, Ukraine

Aviatorske Авіаторське
- Rural settlement
- Location within Ukraine Location within Dnipropetrovsk Oblast
- Coordinates: 48°21′55″N 35°05′00″E
- Country: Ukraine
- Oblast: Dnipropetrovsk Oblast
- Raion: Dnipro Raion
- Hromada: Dnipro urban hromada
- Urban-type settlement: 2004

Population (2022)
  - Total: 2,576

Aviatorśke (Ukrainian: Авіаторське) is a rural settlement in Dnipro Raion within Dnipropetrovsk Oblast of eastern Ukraine. It belongs to Dnipro urban hromada, one of the hromadas of Ukraine. Population: 2,576 (2022 estimate)

Aviatorske is located about 12 kilometres in the southeast of Dnipro city centre. Dnipro International Airport is situated in the vicinity.

== Geographical location ==
The urban-type settlement Aviatorskoe is located 3 km from the right bank of the river Dnieper, 3 km from the city of Dnieper and 2.5 km from the village of Starye Kodaki

== History ==
Until 18 July 2020, Aviatorske belonged to Dnipro Municipality, the administrative division subordinated to the city of oblast significance of Dnipro. The municipality was abolished in July 2020 as part of the administrative reform of Ukraine, which reduced the number of raions of Dnipropetrovsk Oblast to seven. The area of Dnipro Municipality was merged into Dnipro Raion.

Until 26 January 2024, Aviatorske was designated urban-type settlement. On this day, a new law entered into force which abolished this status, and Aviatorske became a rural settlement.
