= Slobozhanske, Dnipropetrovsk Oblast =

Rural locality in Dnipropetrovsk Oblast, Ukraine

Slobozhanske Слобожанське
- Rural settlement
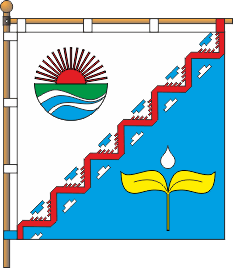
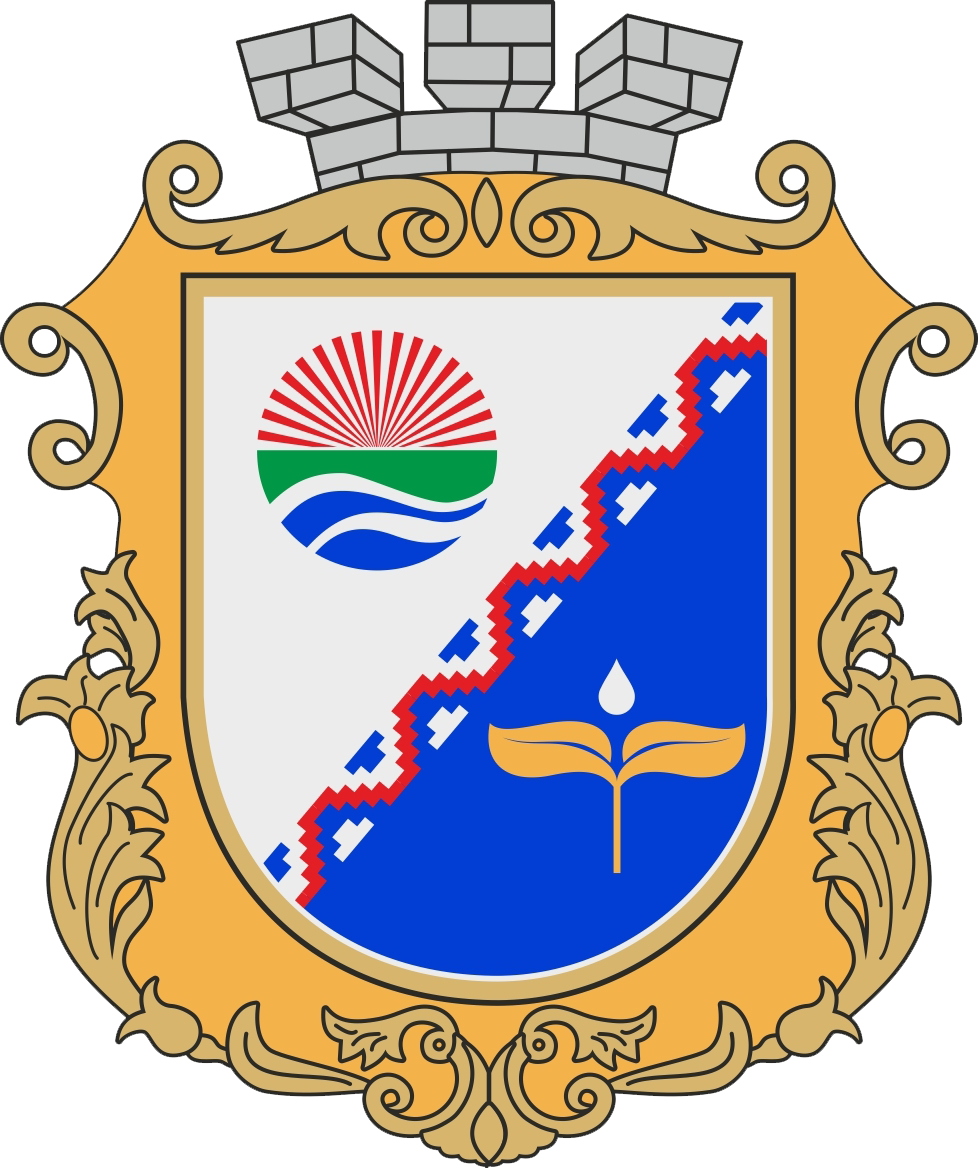
- Flag Seal

- Location within Ukraine Location within Dnipropetrovsk Oblast
- Coordinates: 48°32′1″N 35°4′41″E
- Country: Ukraine
- Oblast: Dnipropetrovsk Oblast
- Raion: Dnipro Raion
- Hromada: Slobozhanske settlement hromada
- Established: 1987
- Founder: Verkhovna Rada
- Settlement council: Slobozhanske settlement council

Government
  - Village head: Ivan Kaminskiy

Population (2022)
  - Total: 14,661
- Time zone: UTC+2 (EET)
  - Summer (DST): UTC+3 (EEST)
- Postal code: 52005
- Area code: +38056/+380562
- Website: slobozhanska-gromada.gov.ua

Slobozhanske (Ukrainian: Слобожанське; Russian: Слобожанское) is a rural settlement in Dnipro Raion, Dnipropetrovsk Oblast, Ukraine. The populated place is part of the Dnipro urban sprawl being its immediate northern suburb. Slobozhanske hosts the administration of Slobozhanske settlement hromada, one of the hromadas of Ukraine. Population: 14,661 (2022 estimate).

== History ==
The first settlements on the territory of modern Slobozhanske appeared as early as the second millennium AD. At the dawn of history, it was home to many nomadic peoples and tribes. The Scythians, Sarmatians and ant-people of the Slavic tribe left their traces here, and with the formation of Kievan Rus, in the 9th-12th centuries, the paths to the south lay through the steppes.

Later, the wagon rolls along the Chumatsky Way left Poltava through Tsarichanka, Chumaky. In 1778, the settlement of Pidhorodne was formed, which has already grown into a city in our time. The origin of the name of the slobodka is connected with the fact that the sloboda was located near the provincial town of Katerynoslav (below the town).

Created in 1987 out of the neighboring city of Pidhorodne, the settlement was previously known as Yuvileine (Ukrainian: Ювілейне) in honor of the "Great October" (the 1917 Russian Bolshevik coup-d'état) until 2016. It was renamed Slobozhanske by the Verkhovna Rada according to the law prohibiting names of Communist origin.

Until 26 January 2024, Slobozhanske was designated urban-type settlement. On this day, a new law entered into force which abolished this status, and Slobozhanske became a rural settlement.

=== Creating a settlement hromada ===
In 2015, the team of the Yuvileine settlement council sent all territorially adjacent village councils a proposal for unification within the framework of local self-government reform. Only one responded – the Stepove village council – due to which the Yuvileine territorial hromada was formed, which was later renamed the Slobozhanske settlement hromada.

== Infrastructure ==
- Secondary comprehensive school of the I-III degree
- First grade school
- Children's preschool educational institution
- Orphanage
- Outpatient clinic of family medicine
- Center of Culture and Leisure "Slobozhanskyi"
- Center for Social Support of Children and Families "Dobre vdoma"
- Sports complex "Slobozhanske".

== Transportation ==
The urban-type settlement is adjacent to the northern outskirts of the city of Dnipro between highways M04 and T0410. On the north-eastern side of the settlement is the park "Friendship of Peoples", which is now a forest park zone. The "Golden Keys" microdistrict was built to the north of the village. The closest railway station, Samarivka, is located on the railway connecting Dnipro and Kharkiv via Berestyn.

== Sports ==
At Slobozhanske based women's volleyball club "Prometey", the champion of Ukraine for the 2020/2021 season. Also, the champion of the Ukrainian basketball Super League of the 2020/2021 season, the men's basketball club "Prometey", performs here.

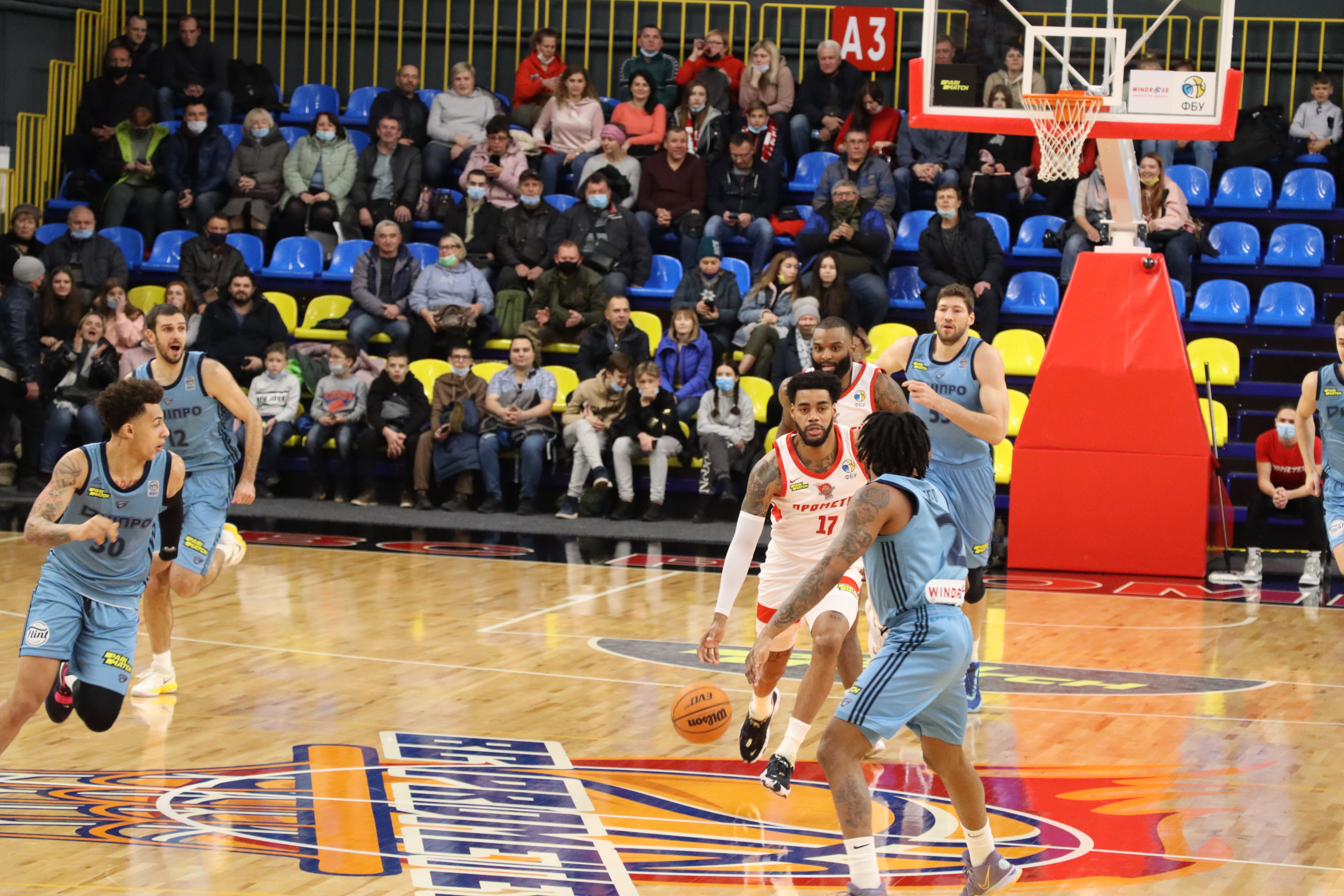
Basketball Super League game - BC "Prometey" - BC "Dnipro"

== People from Slobozhanske ==
- Denys Soroka (born 2001), Ukrainian footballer

== Twin-towns and partnerships ==
- (Latvia) Ādaži Municipality
- (Georgia (country)) Dusheti Municipality
- (Lithuania) Šakiai District Municipality
- (Lithuania) Kupiškis District Municipality
- (Ukraine) Shyroke Village Council
- (Ukraine) Polohy City Council
- (Ukraine) Novoselytsia City Council
- (Ukraine) Manevychi Settlement Council
- (Ukraine) Khotyn City Council
