= Novopokrovka, Dnipropetrovsk Oblast =

Rural locality in Dnipropetrovsk Oblast, Ukraine

Novopokrovka Новопокровка
- Rural settlement
- Location in Dnipropetrovsk Oblast Location in Ukraine
- Coordinates: 48°04′01″N 34°36′37″E
- Country: Ukraine
- Oblast: Dnipropetrovsk Oblast
- Raion: Dnipro Raion

Population (2022)
  - Total: 1,715
- Time zone: UTC+2 (EET)
  - Summer (DST): UTC+3 (EEST)

Novopokrovka (Ukrainian: Новопокровка; Russian: Новопокровка) is a rural settlement in Dnipro Raion, Dnipropetrovsk Oblast, Ukraine. It is located on the banks of the Komyshuvata Sura, a tributary of the Mokra Sura in the drainage basin of the Dnieper. Novopokrovka hosts the administration of Novopokrovka settlement hromada, one of the hromadas of Ukraine. Population: 1,725 (2022 estimate).

== History ==
Until 18 July 2020, Novopokrovka belonged to Solone Raion. The raion was abolished in July 2020 as part of the administrative reform of Ukraine, which reduced the number of raions of Dnipropetrovsk Oblast to seven. The area of Solone Raion was merged into Dnipro Raion.

Until 26 January 2024, Novopokrovka was designated urban-type settlement. On this day, a new law entered into force which abolished this status, and Novopokrovka became a rural settlement.

== Economy ==
=== Transportation ===
Novopokrovka has access to the M04 highway connecting Dnipro and Kropyvnytskyi, as well as to P73 highway with further connections to Zaporizhia and Nikopol.

The closest railway station, Ryasna, in the village of Sviatovasylivka approximately 10 kilometres (6.2 mi) north of Novopokrovka, is on the railway line connecting Dnipro and Apostolove. There is infrequent passenger traffic.
