= Voloske, Dnipropetrovsk Oblast =

Rural locality in Dnipropetrovsk Oblast, Ukraine

Voloske
- village
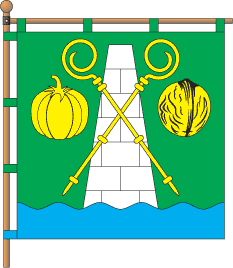
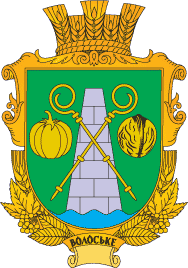
- Flag Coat of arms

- Location of Voloske Voloske (Dnipropetrovsk Oblast)
- Coordinates: 48°18′36″N 35°8′014″E
- Country: Ukraine
- Oblast: Dnipropetrovsk Oblast
- Raion: Dnipro Raion

Voloske is a village in Voloske Commune in central Ukraine. It is in Dnipro Raion in Dnipropetrovsk Oblast. It belongs to Novooleksandrivka rural hromada, one of the hromadas of Ukraine.
