= Tsarychanka Raion =

Former subdivision of Dnipropetrovsk Oblast, Ukraine

Tsarychanka Raion Царичанський район
- Raion
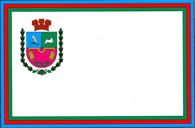
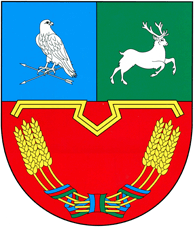
- Flag Coat of arms

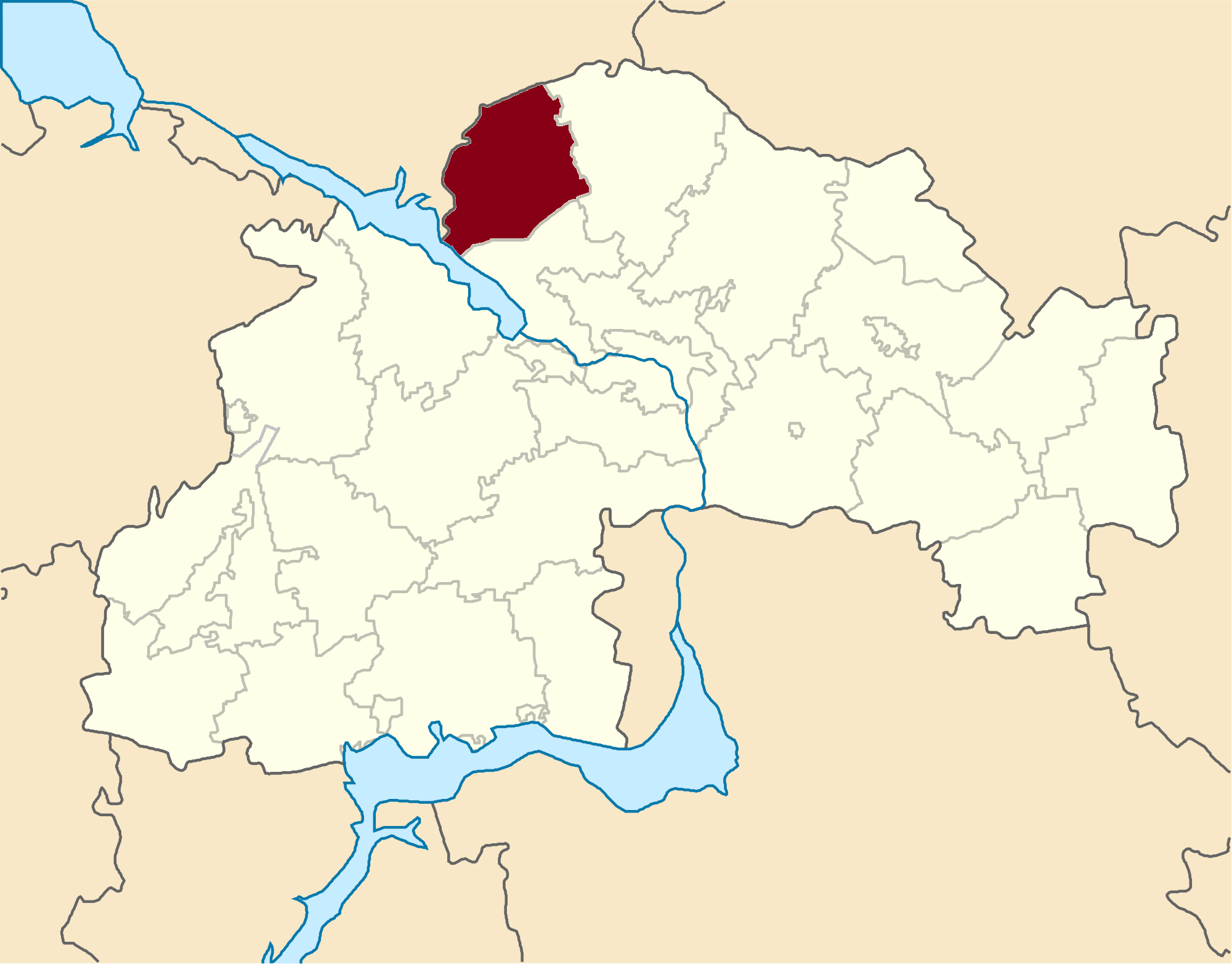
- Coordinates: 48°56′30″N 34°29′14″E
- Country: Ukraine
- Region: Dnipropetrovsk Oblast
- Disestablished: 18 July 2020
- Admin. center: Tsarychanka
- Subdivisions: List: — city councils; — settlement councils; — rural councils; Number of localities: — cities; — urban-type settlements; — villages; — rural settlements

Area
  - Total: 900 km^{2} (350 sq mi)

Population (2020)
  - Total: 26,079
  - Density: 29/km^{2} (75/sq mi)
- Time zone: UTC+02:00 (EET)
  - Summer (DST): UTC+03:00 (EEST)
- Area code: +380

Tsarychanka Raion (Ukrainian: Царичанський район) was a raion (district) of Dnipropetrovsk Oblast, southeastern-central Ukraine. Its administrative center was the urban-type settlement of Tsarychanka. On 18 July 2020, as part of Ukraine's administrative reform, Tsarychanka Raion was abolished. The reform reduced the number of raions in Dnipropetrovsk Oblast to seven, and the area of Tsarychanka Raion was merged into Dnipro Raion. The last estimate of the raion population was 26,079 (2020 est.).

At the time of its disestablishment, the raion comprised four hromadas:

- Kytaihorod rural hromada with the administration in the selo of Kytaihorod;
- Liashkivka rural hromada with the administration in the selo of Liashkivka;
- Mohyliv rural hromada with the administration in the selo of Mohyliv;
- Tsarychanka settlement hromada with the administration in Tsarychanka.

== Gallery ==
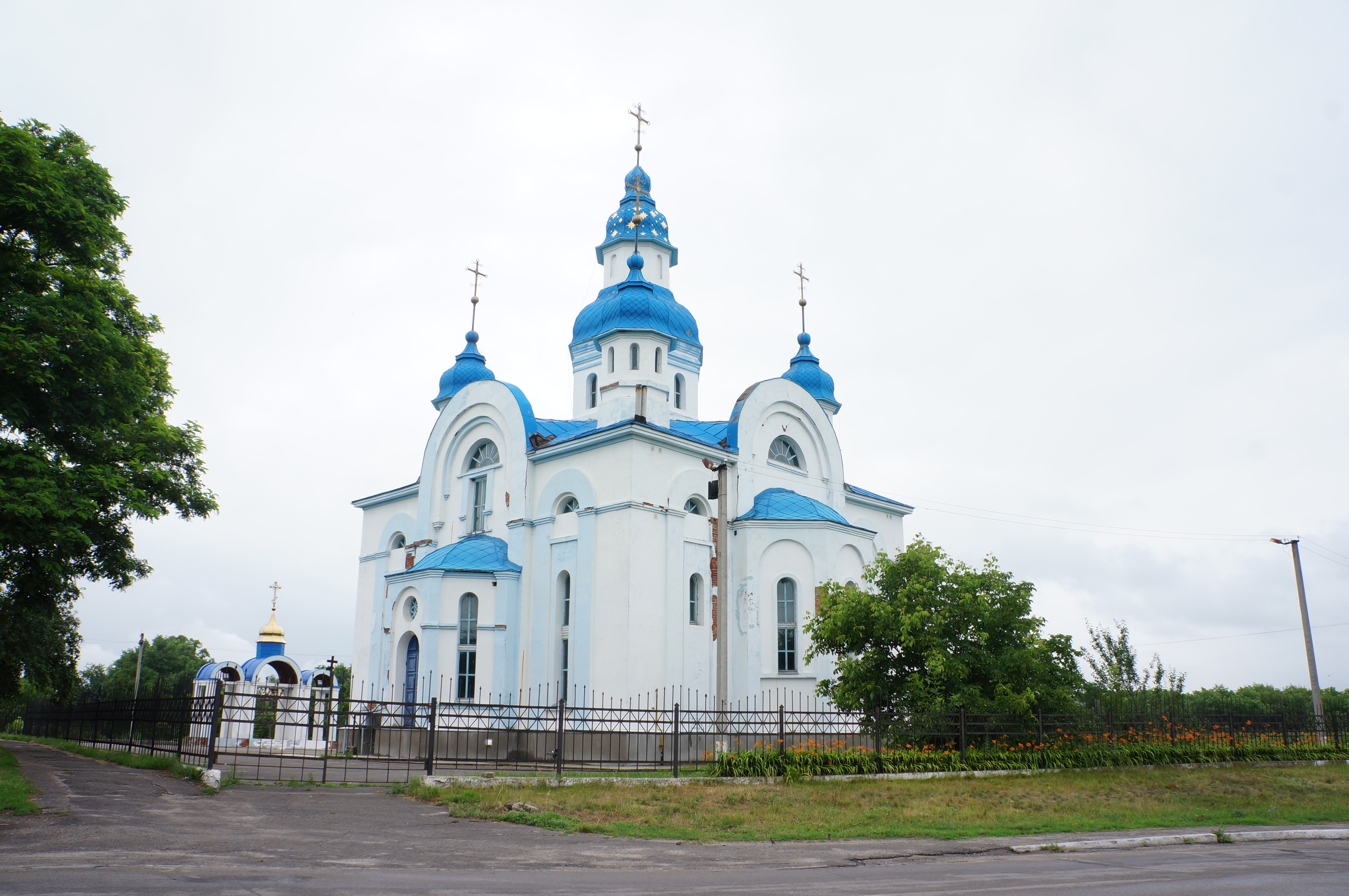
Pokrova Cathedral in Tsarychanka
