= Solone Raion =

Former subdivision of Dnipropetrovsk Oblast, Ukraine

Solone Raion Солонянський район
- Raion
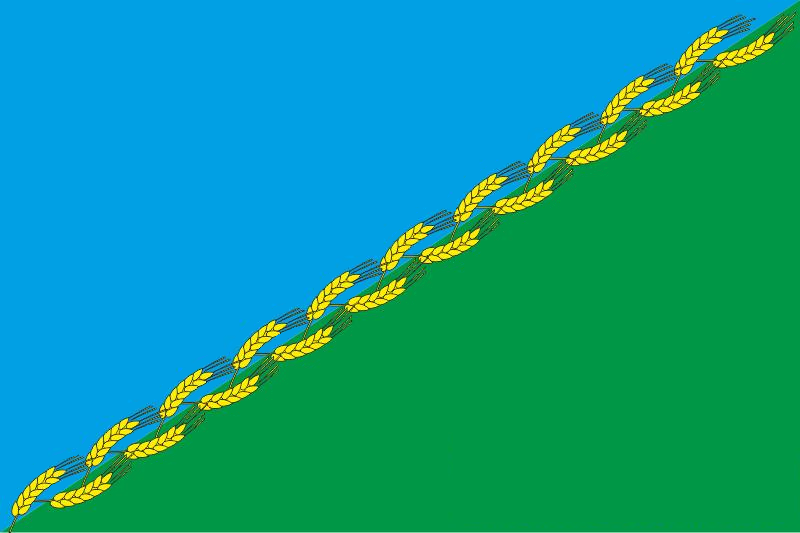
- Flag Coat of arms

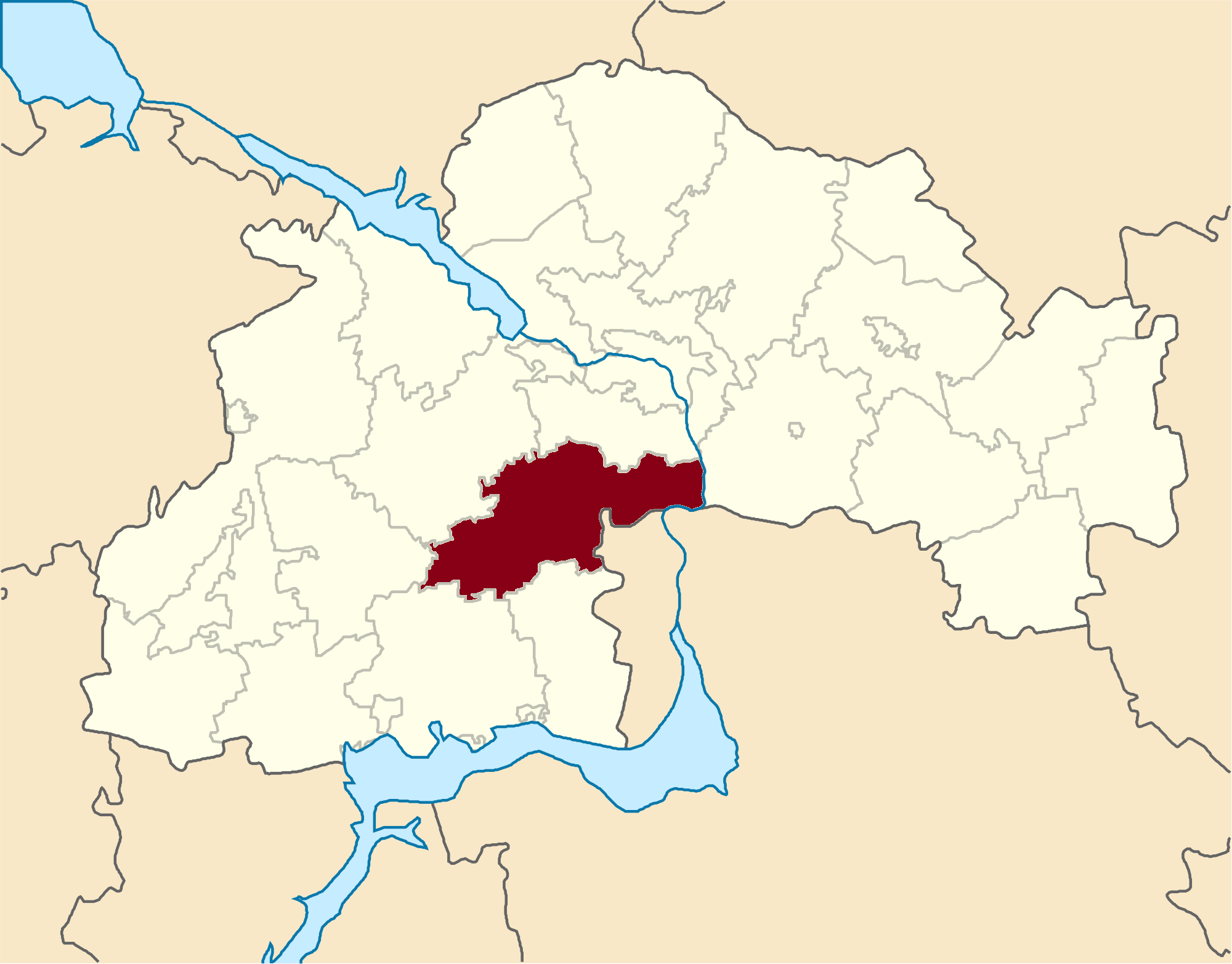
- Coordinates: 48°12′10″N 34°52′35″E
- Country: Ukraine
- Region: Dnipropetrovsk Oblast
- Disestablished: 18 July 2020
- Admin. center: Solone
- Subdivisions: List: — city councils; — settlement councils; — rural councils; Number of localities: — cities; — urban-type settlements; — villages; — rural settlements

Area
  - Total: 1,738 km^{2} (671 sq mi)

Population (2020)
  - Total: 37,429
  - Density: 21.54/km^{2} (55.78/sq mi)
- Time zone: UTC+02:00 (EET)
  - Summer (DST): UTC+03:00 (EEST)
- Area code: +380

Solone Raion (Ukrainian: Солонянський район, romanized: Solonianskyi raion) was a raion (district) of Dnipropetrovsk Oblast, southeastern-central Ukraine. Its administrative centre was located at the urban-type settlement of Solone. The raion was abolished on 18 July 2020 as part of the administrative reform of Ukraine, which reduced the number of raions of Dnipropetrovsk Oblast to seven. The area of Solone Raion was merged into Dnipro Raion. The last estimate of the raion population was 37,429 (2020 est.).

At the time of disestablishment, the raion consisted of three hromadas:

- Novopokrovka settlement hromada with the administration in the urban-type settlement of Novopokrovka;
- Solone settlement hromada with the administration in Solone;
- Sviatovasylivka settlement hromada with the administration in the settlement of Sviatovasylivka.
