= Dnipro urban hromada =

Urban hromada of Dnipropetrovsk Oblast, Ukraine

Dnipro urban hromada Дніпровська міська громада
- Hromada
- Seal
- Interactive map of Dnipro urban hromada
- Country: Ukraine
- Oblast: Dnipropetrovsk Oblast
- Raion: Dnipro Raion

Area
  - Total: 406.0 km^{2} (156.8 sq mi)

Population (2023)
  - Total: 993,220
  - Density: 2,446/km^{2} (6,336/sq mi)
- Settlements: 2
- Cities: 1
- Towns: 1
- Website: dniprorada.gov.ua/uk

Dnipro urban territorial hromada (Ukrainian: Дніпровська міська територіальна громада, romanized: Dniprovska miska terytorialna hromada) is one of the hromadas of Ukraine, located in Dnipro Raion within Dnipropetrovsk Oblast. Its capital is the city of Dnipro.

The hromada has an area of 406.0 km^{2} (156.8 mi^{2}), as well as a population of 993,220 (as of 2023).

== Composition ==
In addition to one city (Dnipro), the hromada contains the rural settlement of Aviatorske.
