= Denys Soroka =

Ukrainian footballer

Personal information
- Full name: Denys Oleksandrovych Soroka
- Date of birth: 27 July 2001 (age 25)
- Place of birth: Yuvileyne, Ukraine
- Height: 1.84 m (6 ft 0 in)
- Position: Left-back

Team information
- Current team: Hirnyk-Sport
- Number: 5

Youth career
- –2013: Olimpik Yuvileyne
- 2014–2018: Dnipro

Senior career*
Years	Team	Apps	(Gls)
2018–2019	Dnipro	15	(0)
2019–2022	Dnipro-1	0	(0)
2021–2022	→ Nikopol (loan)	16	(0)
2022	Skoruk Tomakivka	3	(1)
2023–	Hirnyk-Sport Horishni Plavni	4	(0)
- * Club domestic league appearances and goals as of 14 June 2023

Denys Oleksandrovych Soroka (Ukrainian: Денис Олександрович Сорока; born 27 July 2001) is a Ukrainian professional footballer who plays as a left-back for Hirnyk-Sport.

== Career ==
In the summer 2022 he moved to Ukrainian First League club Skoruk Tomakivka. On 27 August 2022 he scored against Chernihiv at the Yunist Stadium in Chernihiv.
