= Novomykolaivka =

Novomykolaivka (Ukrainian: Новомиколаївка) may refer to several places in Ukraine:

== Dnipropetrovsk Oblast ==
- Novomykolaivka, Dnipropetrovsk Oblast

== Donetsk Oblast ==
- Novomykolaivka, Cherkaske settlement hromada, Kramatorsk Raion, Donetsk Oblast
- Novomykolaivka, Druzhkivka urban hromada, Kramatorsk Raion, Donetsk Oblast
- Novomykolaivka, Pokrovsk Raion, Donetsk Oblast
- Novomykolaivka, Shakhtarsk Raion, Donetsk Oblast
- Novomykolaivka, Volnovakha Raion, Donetsk Oblast

== Odesa Oblast ==
- Novomykolaivka, Berzivka Raion, Odesa Oblast
- Novomykolaivka, Izmail Raion, Odesa Oblast
- Novomykolaivka, Rozdilna Raion, Odesa Oblast

== Zaporizhzhia Oblast ==
- Novomykolaivka, Zaporizhzhia Oblast
- Novomykolaivka, Polohy Raion, Zaporizhzhia Oblast
