= Balivka, Poltava Oblast =

Balivka Балівка
- Village
- Balivka
- Location within Poltava Oblast Location within Ukraine
- Coordinates: 49°22′49″N 34°25′18″E
- Country: Ukraine
- Oblast: Poltava Oblast
- Raion: Poltava Raion
- Hromada: Novi Sanzhary settlement hromada

Area
  - Total: 5.016 km^{2} (1.937 sq mi)
- Elevation: 80 m (260 ft)

Population (2001)
  - Total: 65
  - Density: 13/km^{2} (34/sq mi)
- Time zone: UTC+2 (EET)
  - Summer (DST): UTC+3 (EEST)
- Postal code: 39314
- Area code: +380 5344

Balivka (Ukrainian: Балівка) is a village in the Poltava Raion of the Poltava Oblast, Ukraine. It belongs to Novi Sanzhary settlement hromada, one of the hromadas of Ukraine.

Until 18 July 2020, Balivka was located in Novi Sanzhary Raion. The raion was abolished in July 2020 as part of the administrative reform of Ukraine, which reduced the number of raions of Poltava Oblast to four. The area of Novi Sanzhary Raion was merged into Poltava Raion.
