= Tsarychanka =

Rural locality in Dnipropetrovsk Oblast, Ukraine

Tsarychanka Царичанка
- Rural settlement
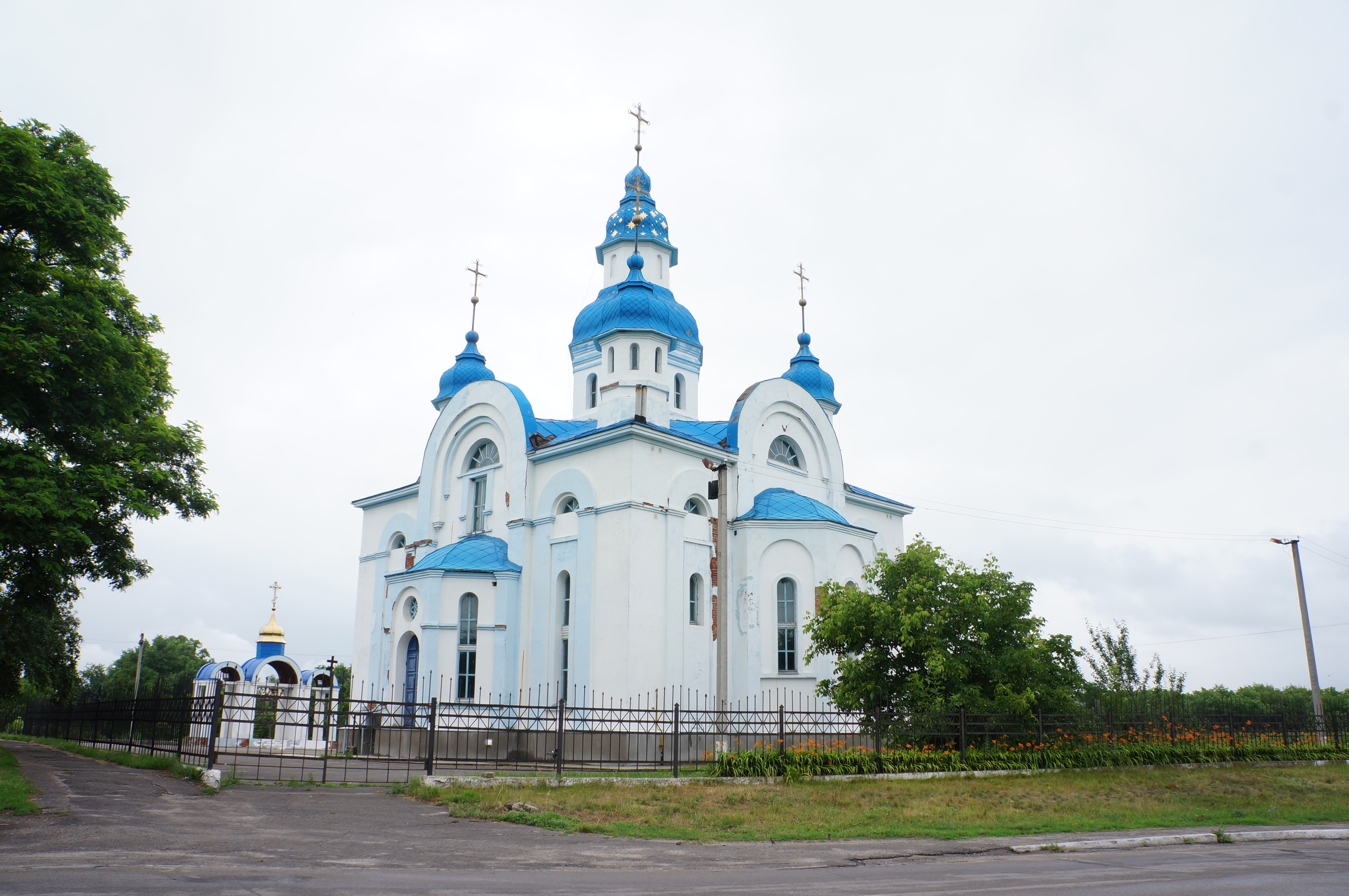

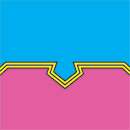
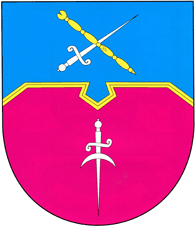
- Flag Seal

- Location within Ukraine Location within Dnipropetrovsk Oblast
- Coordinates: 48°56′46″N 34°28′41″E
- Country: Ukraine
- Oblast: Dnipropetrovsk Oblast
- Raion: Dnipro Raion
- First mentioned: 1604

Population (2022)
  - Total: 7,105
- Time zone: UTC+2 (EET)
  - Summer (DST): UTC+3 (EEST)

Tsarychanka (Ukrainian: Царичанка; Russian: Царичанка) is a rural settlement in Dnipro Raion, Dnipropetrovsk Oblast, Ukraine. It hosts the administration of Tsarychanka settlement hromada, one of the hromadas of Ukraine. Population: 7,105 (2022 estimate). Soon after the liquidation of the Zaporozhian Sich, in 1784 to 1797, it was known as Aleksopol.

Tsarychanka is located in the north of the Oblast, on the right bank of the Oril, a left tributary of the Dnieper.

== History ==
Tsarychanka appeared sometime in the 17th century. During the reign of the Hetman Ivan Samoylovych (late 17th century), in the place settled cossacks Havrylo Salo and Oleksiy Kocherha. Later, they were joined by people from Uman, right-bank Ukraine. In 1692, the settlement along with other populated places in the area was part of the uprising against Tsarist (Muscovite) forces and the local administration. During one of the Muscovite-Ottoman war campaigns, Tsarychanka was obliterated in 1696, according to the History of Cities and Villages of the Ukrainian SSR. However, already during the Great Northern War in 1709, it housed a Muscovite garrison.

In 1731, Tsarychanka, as a fortress, became part of the Ukrainian fortification line (Ukrainian line). In the official list of the line's fortresses, it is not mentioned. In April of 1736, it became the headquarters of the Russian-Ukrainian army of Count Burkhard Christoph von Münnich that was preparing for the raid against the Crimean Khanate.

Until 1764, Tsarychanka remained a hundred (sotnia) town of the Poltava regiment. Note, both "regiment" and "hundred" were forms of administrative division in Ukraine in the 17th and 18th centuries. In 1722, it was mentioned that the local population was paying taxes to the office located at the Perevolochna fortress.

In 1765, Tsarychanka became a town of the Novorossiysk Governorate. The first Novorossiysk Governorate was a "transitional" formation along the border with the Zaporizhian Sich free domains. After liquidation of the Zaporozhian Sich, in 1775 to 1787, it was an administrative center of a county (uyezd) with a voyevoda chancellery of the Azov Governorate. As Aleksopol, for a short period of time, it became part of the Yekaterinoslav Namestnichestvo. In 1797, Tsarychanka was degraded to posad (urban-like settlement).

In October of 1769, Tsarychanka joined the large-scale Lancers Uprising, in which participated lancers of the Donets regiment and the Dnieper regiments. The uprising was active throughout the area of the left-bank Ukraine as well as Sloboda Ukraine. In 1770, the Russian government dispatched a regular Russian army to suppress the mutiny.

In 1780, following one of the sieges of Ochakov, in Tsarychanka was treated Russian general Alexander Suvorov from wounds that he received during the latest siege.

In 1816, Tsarychanka became a military settlement (voyenoye poseleniye), an official class of populated places in the Russian Empire.

In the 19th century Tsarychanka was the administrative center of Tsarychanka volost, Kobelyaksky Uyezd, Poltava Governorate.

During the World War II, on 18 September 1941, units of the Red Army withdrew from the settlement. Tsarychanka was liberated from the Nazi German occupation on 24 September 1943. In the fight, units of the Red Army 48th Division participated, with a battalion of the 143 Rifle Regiment entering the place first. Supposedly, the withdrawing German forces burned down the village with only 62 buildings out of 1300 remaining. The local kolkhoz worker Loboda contributed his own saved-up 35,000 Soviet rubles to build an armored tank column "Vyzvolena Ukraina" (Liberated Ukraine).

Until 18 July 2020, Tsarychanka was the administrative center of Tsarychanka Raion. The raion was abolished in July 2020 as part of the administrative reform of Ukraine, which reduced the number of raions of Dnipropetrovsk Oblast to seven. The area of Tsarychanka Raion was merged into Dnipro Raion.

Until 26 January 2024, Tsarychanka was designated urban-type settlement. On this day, a new law entered into force which abolished this status, and Tsarychanka became a rural settlement.

== Economy ==
=== Transportation ===
Tsarychanka is situated on a road connecting Dnipro and Kobeliaky, where it has access to another road connecting Poltava and Kremenchuk. In Tsarychanka, a road branches off east to Mahdalynivka and Hubynykha.
