= Mykolaivka rural hromada, Dnipro Raion, Dnipropetrovsk Oblast =

Mykolaivka rural hromada Миколаївська сільська громада
- Hromada
- Interactive map of Mykolaivka rural hromada
- Country: Ukraine
- Oblast: Dnipropetrovsk Oblast
- Raion: Dnipro Raion

Area
  - Total: 370.3 km^{2} (143.0 sq mi)

Population (2020)
  - Total: 6,634
  - Density: 17.92/km^{2} (46.40/sq mi)
- Settlements: 10
- Rural settlements: 2
- Villages: 8

Mykolaivka rural hromada (Ukrainian: Миколаївська сільська громада) is a hromada of Ukraine, located in Dnipro Raion, Dnipropetrovsk Oblast. Its administrative center is the village of Mykolaivka.

It has an area of 370.3 square kilometres (143.0 mi^{2}) and a population of 6,634, as of 2020.

The hromada contains 10 settlements, including 8 villages:

- Blahovishchenka
- Mykolaivka
- Dolynske
- Nove
- Novotaromske
- Pashena Balka
- Stepove
- Surske

And 2 rural-type settlements: Gorky and Shevchenko.

== See also ==
- List of hromadas of Ukraine
