= Obukhivka =

Rural locality in Dnipropetrovsk Oblast, Ukraine

Obukhivka Обухівка
- Rural settlement
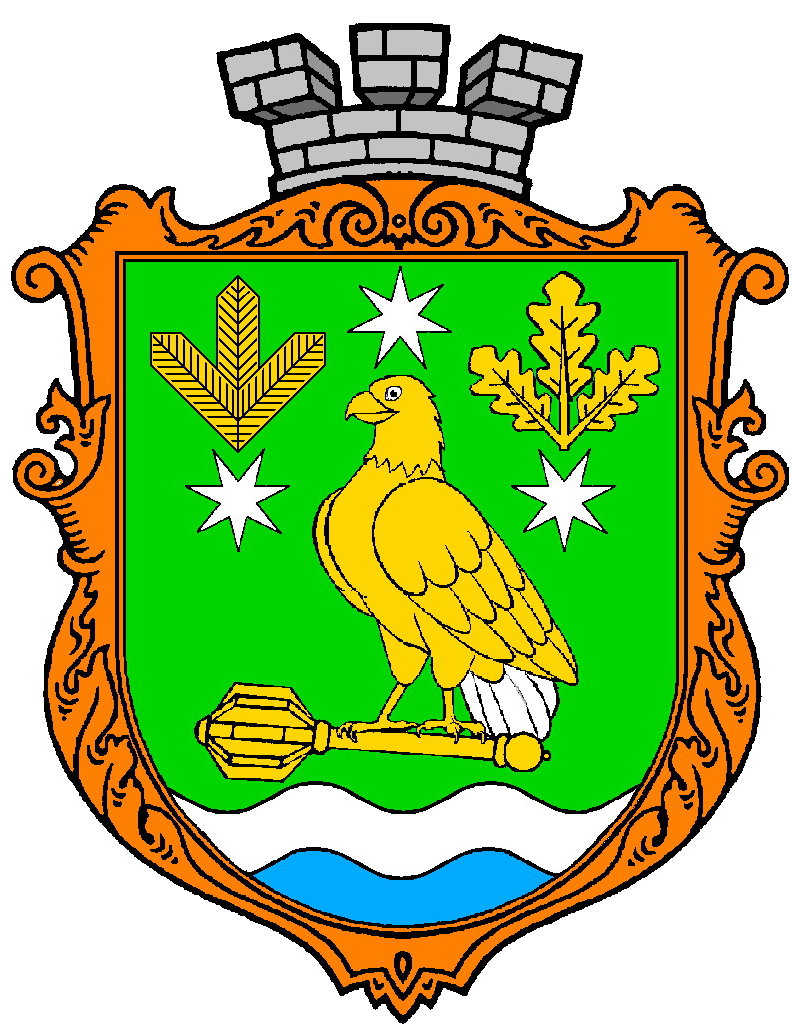
- Coat of arms

- Location within Ukraine Location within Dnipropetrovsk Oblast
- Coordinates: 48°32′36″N 34°51′32″E
- Country: Ukraine
- Oblast: Dnipropetrovsk Oblast
- Raion: Dnipro Raion

Population (2022)
  - Total: 9,137
- Time zone: UTC+2 (EET)
  - Summer (DST): UTC+3 (EEST)

Obukhivka (Ukrainian: Обухівка; Russian: Обуховка) is a rural settlement in Dnipro Raion, Dnipropetrovsk Oblast, Ukraine. Until 2016, the settlement was known as Kirovske. It was renamed by the Verkhovna Rada according to the law prohibiting names of communist origin. Obukhivka is a suburb of Dnipro and is located on the left bank of the Dnieper. It hosts the administration of Obukhivka settlement hromada, one of the hromadas of Ukraine. Population: 9,137 (2022 estimate).

The kindergarten, built in 2018, was nominated in February 2020 by the organizers of the Mies van der Rohe Award for the EU Prize in Contemporary Architecture.

Until 26 January 2024, Obukhivka was designated urban-type settlement. On this day, a new law entered into force which abolished this status, and Obukhivka became a rural settlement.

== Economy ==
=== Transportation ===
The closest passenger railway station is in Dnipro.

Obukhivka is on Highway H31 which connects Dnipro and Reshetylivka.
