= Siege of Ochakov =

Siege of Ochakov may refer to:

- Siege of Ochakiv (1670), during the Cossacks Raid
- Siege of Ochakov (1737), the first siege during the Russo-Turkish War of 1735–1739
- Siege of Ochakov (1771), the second siege during the Russo-Turkish War of 1768–1774
- Siege of Ochakov (1788), the third siege during the Russo-Turkish War of 1787–1792
  - Naval actions at the siege of Ochakov (1788)
