= Pidhorodnie =

City in Dnipropetrovsk Oblast, Ukraine

Pidhorodnie Підгороднє
- City
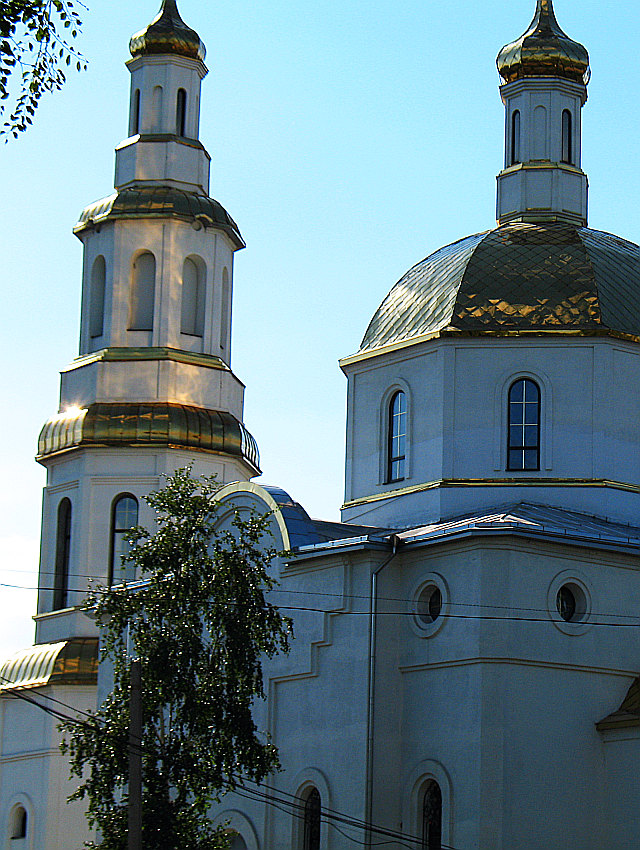
- St John's Church

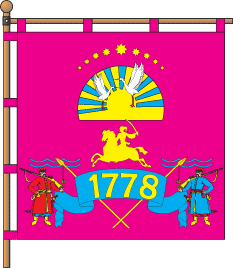
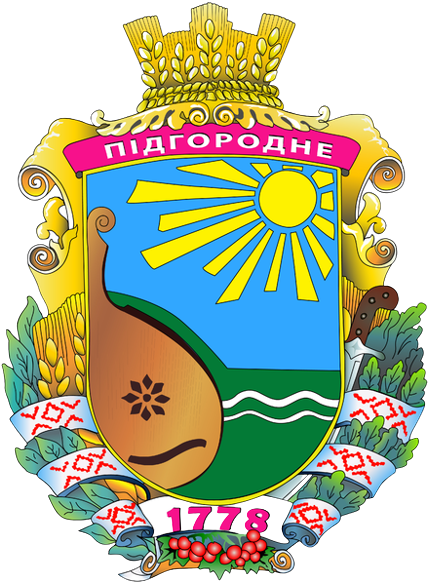
- Flag Coat of arms
- Interactive map of Pidhorodnie
- Location within Ukraine Location within Dnipropetrovsk Oblast
- Coordinates: 48°34′30″N 35°06′08″E
- Country: Ukraine
- Oblast: Dnipropetrovsk Oblast
- Raion: Dnipro Raion
- Hromada: Pidhorodne urban hromada
- Founded: 17th century
- City rights: 1981

Government
  - Mayor: Gorb Vor

Area
  - Total: 355 km^{2} (137 sq mi)
- Elevation: 56 m (184 ft)

Population (2022)
  - Total: 19,138
  - Density: 500/km^{2} (1,300/sq mi)
- Postal code: 52001-52004
- Area code: +380-562(2)

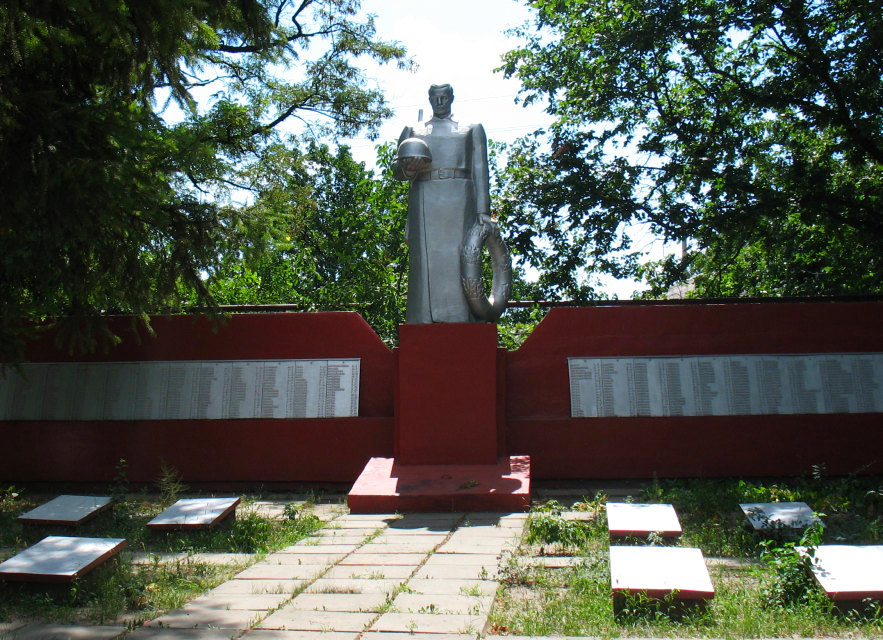
WW2 monument in Pidhorodnie

Pidhorodnie (Ukrainian: Підгороднє [pidɦoˈrɔdnʲe]), formerly Pidhorodne (Підгородне [pʲidɦɔˈrɔdne]), is a city in Dnipro Raion, Dnipropetrovsk Oblast, Ukraine. It hosts the administration of Pidhorodne urban hromada, one of the hromadas of Ukraine. Population: 19,138 (2022 estimate). In 2001, the population was 17,763.

The populated place is known since 1600 as a "wintering place" (zymivnyk) of Cossacks from Samar and carried a name Bohorodytski Khutory (hamlets of Theotokos).

Soon after the liquidation of the Zaporozhian Sich, in 1778 those hamlets were united into a "state military sloboda" of Pidhorodne being located near the newly established Yekaterinoslav (before being moved to the right bank of Dnieper).

On 12 October 2024, the National Commission of the State Language added Pidhorodne to the list of populated places that should be renamed as part of derussification. To comply with the norms of the Ukrainian language, the city was renamed to Pidhorodnie on 18 June 2025.

== Demographics ==
As of the 2001 Ukrainian census, the Pidhorodnie had a population of 17,778 inhabitants. In terms of ethnicities, almost 92% of the population are ethnic Ukrainians, followed by a sizeable minority of people, who claimed to have a Russian background and a number of smaller ethnic minorities. The exact ethnic and linguistic composition of the settlement was as follows:

Ethnic groups in Pidhorodnie
	percent
Ukrainians	91.69%
Russians	6.91%
Belarusians	0.40%
Gypsies	0.19%
Azerbaijanis	0.16%
Moldovans	0.11%
Germans	0.10%

Native languages in Pidhorodnie
	percent
Ukrainian	91.7%
Russian	8.0%
Belarusian	0.1%
others	0.2%
