= Novomoskovsk uezd =

Newmoscow uezd Новомосковскій уѣздъ
- Uezd
- Coat of arms

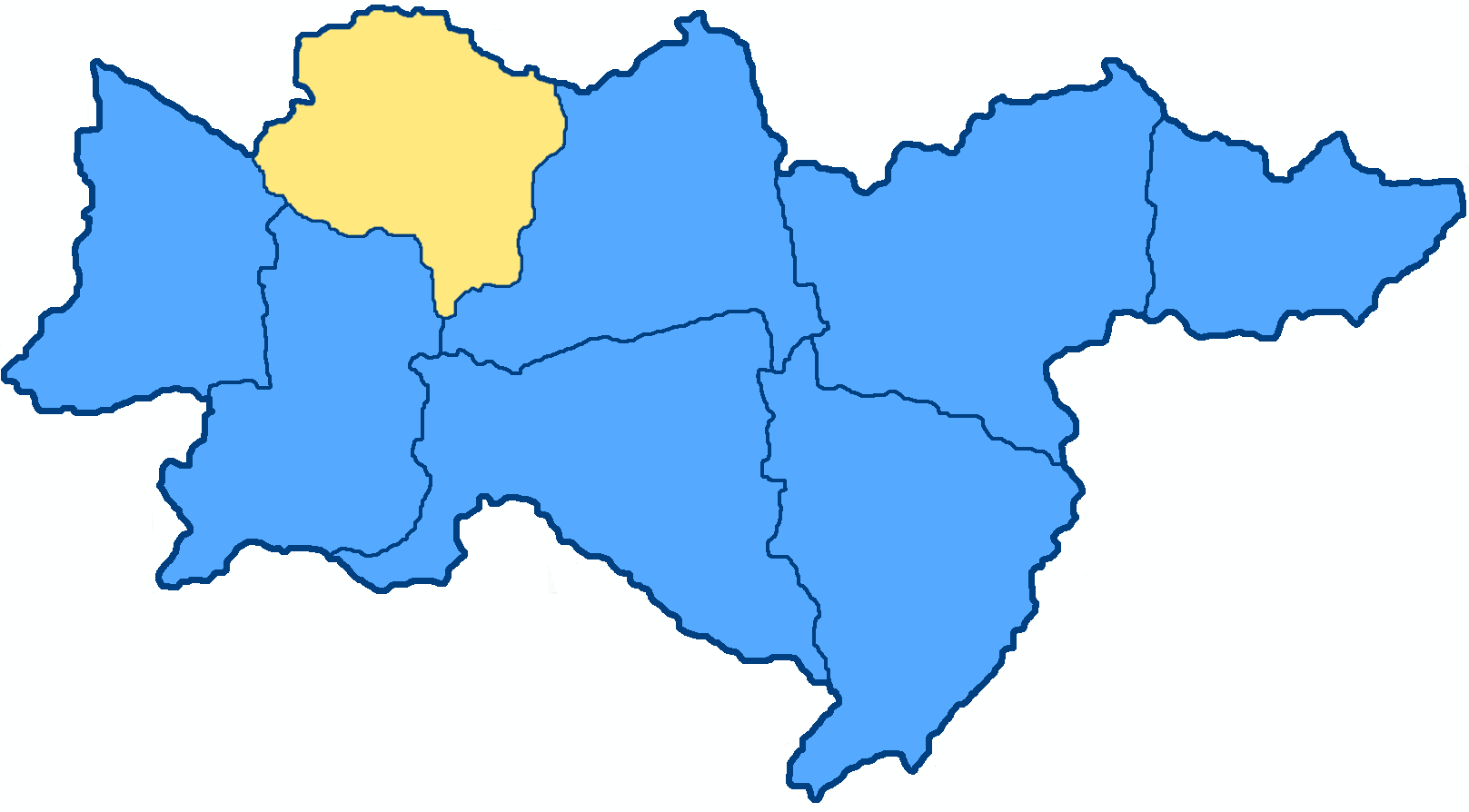
- Location in the Yekaterinoslav Governorate
- Country: Russian Empire
- Governorate: Yekaterinoslav
- Established: 1784
- Abolished: 1923
- Capital: Newmoscow

Area
  - Total: 6,532.24 km^{2} (2,522.11 sq mi)

Population (1897)
  - Total: 260,368
  - Density: 39.8589/km^{2} (103.234/sq mi)

The Novomoskovsk uezd (Russian: Новомосковскій уѣздъ, romanized: Novomoskovskiy uyezd; Ukrainian: Новомосковський повіт, romanized: Novomoskovs'kyi povit) was one of the subdivisions of the Yekaterinoslav Governorate of the Russian Empire. It was situated in the northwestern part of the governorate. Its administrative centre was Novomoskovsk.

== Demographics ==
At the time of the Russian Empire Census of 1897, Novomoskovsky Uyezd had a population of 260,368. Of these, 93.2% spoke Ukrainian, 3.7% Russian, 1.4% Yiddish, 1.3% German, 0.1% Polish, 0.1% Romani and 0.1% Belarusian as their native language.
