= Dnipro Raion =

Subdivision of Dnipropetrovsk Oblast, Ukraine

Dnipro Raion Дніпровський район
- Raion
- Dniprovskyi raion
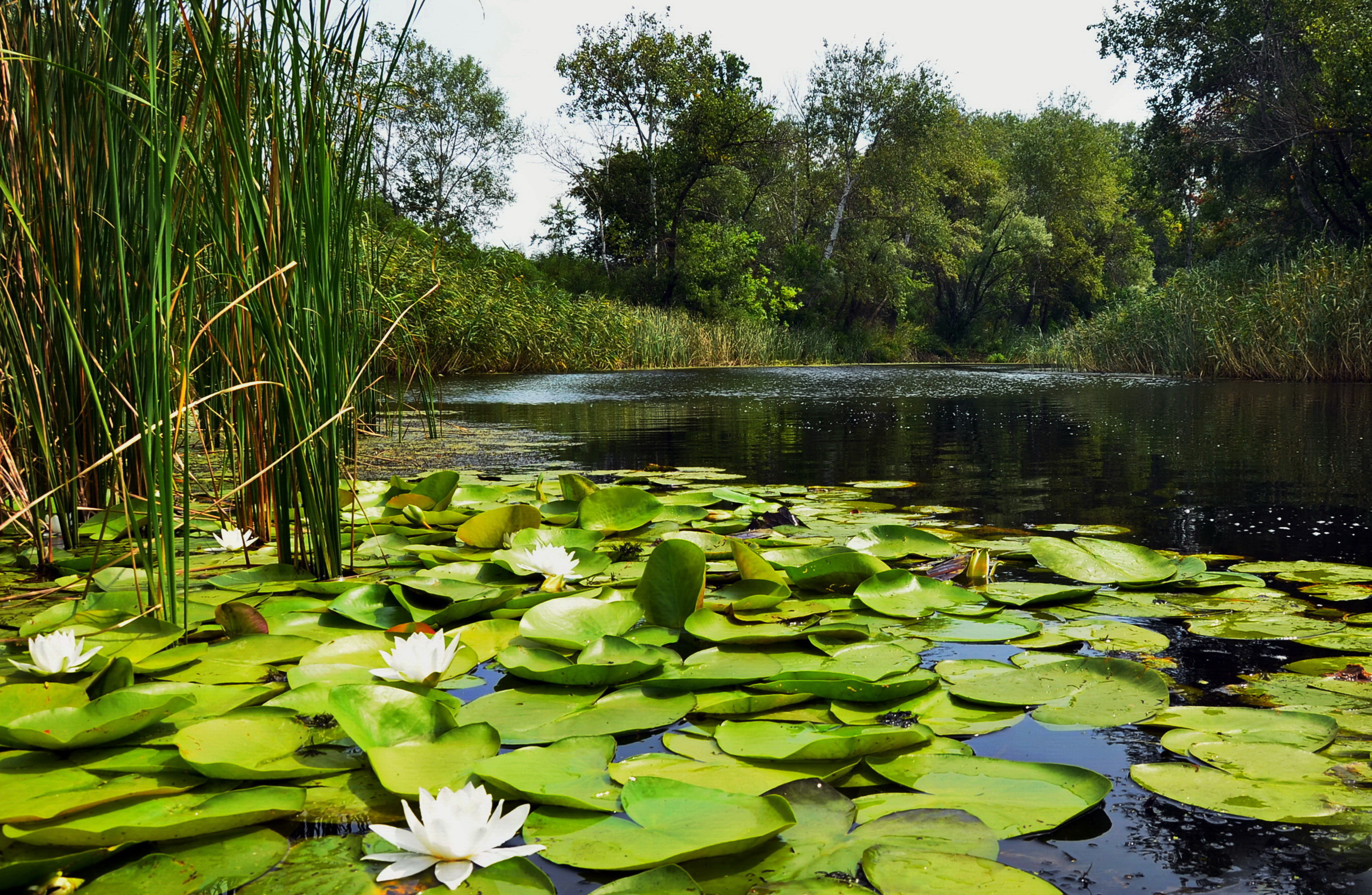
- Lilies near Katerynivka, Dnipro Raion

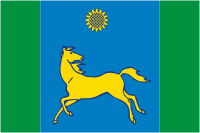
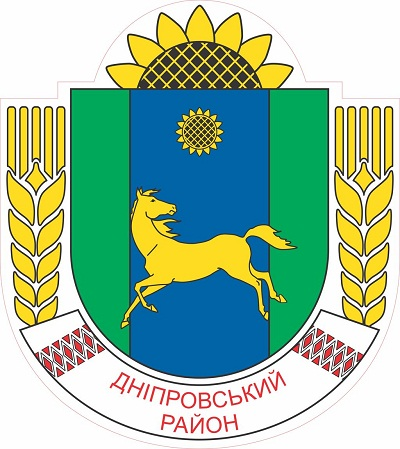
- Flag Coat of arms
- Interactive map of Dnipro Raion
- Coordinates: 48°34′24.9″N 35°7′21.3″E
- Country: Ukraine
- Oblast: Dnipropetrovsk
- Admin. center: Dnipro
- Subdivisions: 17 hromadas

Area
  - Total: 5,605.7 km^{2} (2,164.4 sq mi)

Population (2022)
  - Total: 1,145,065
  - Density: 204.27/km^{2} (529.05/sq mi)
- Time zone: UTC+02:00 (EET)
  - Summer (DST): UTC+03:00 (EEST)
- Area code: +380
- KATOTTH: UA12020000000052809

Dnipro Raion (Ukrainian: Дніпровський район), formerly Dnipropetrovsk Raion (Ukrainian: Дніпропетровський район) until 2016, is a raion (district) of Dnipropetrovsk Oblast, southeastern Ukraine. Its administrative centre is the city of Dnipro. The population is 1,145,065 (2022 estimate).

On 18 July 2020, as part of the administrative reform of Ukraine, the number of raions of Dnipropetrovsk Oblast was reduced to seven, and the area of Dnipro Raion was significantly expanded. Three abolished raions, Petrykivka, Solone, and Tsarychanka Raions, as well as Dnipro Municipality, were merged into Dnipro Raion. The January 2020 estimate of the raion population was 83,879 (2020 est.).

== Subdivisions ==
=== Current ===
After the reform in July 2020, the raion consisted of 17 hromadas:

- Chumaky rural hromada with the administration in the selo of Chumaky, retained from Dnipro Raion;
- Dnipro urban hromada with the administration in the city of Dnipro, transferred from Dnipro Municipality;
- Kytaihorod rural hromada with the administration in the selo of Kytaihorod, transferred from Tsarychanka Raion;
- Liashkivka rural hromada with the administration in the selo of Liashkivka, transferred from Tsarychanka Raion;
- Liubymivka rural hromada with the administration in the selo of Liubymivka retained from Dnipro Raion;
- Mohyliv rural hromada with the administration in the selo of Mohyliv, transferred from Tsarychanka Raion;
- Mykolaivka rural hromada with the administration in the selo of Mykolaivka, retained from Dnipro Raion;
- Novooleksandrivka rural hromada with the administration in the selo of Novooleksandrivka, retained from Dnipro Raion;
- Novopokrovka settlement hromada with the administration in the rural settlement of Novopokrovka, transferred from Solone Raion;
- Obukhivka settlement hromada with the administration in the rural settlement of Obukhivka retained from Dnipro Raion;
- Petrykivka settlement hromada with the administration in the rural settlement of Petrykivka transferred from Petrykivka Raion;
- Pidhorodne urban hromada with the administration in the city of Pidhorodne, retained from Dnipro Raion;
- Slobozhanske settlement hromada with the administration in the rural settlement of Slobozhanske, retained from Dnipro Raion;
- Solone settlement hromada with the administration in the rural settlement of Solone transferred from Solone Raion;
- Sursko-Lytovske rural hromada with the administration in the selo of Sursko-Lytovske retained from Dnipro Raion;
- Sviatovasylivka settlement hromada with the administration in the settlement of Sviatovasylivka transferred from Solone Raion.
- Tsarychanka settlement hromada with the administration in the rural settlement of Tsarychanka, transferred from Tsarychanka Raion.

=== Before 2020 ===
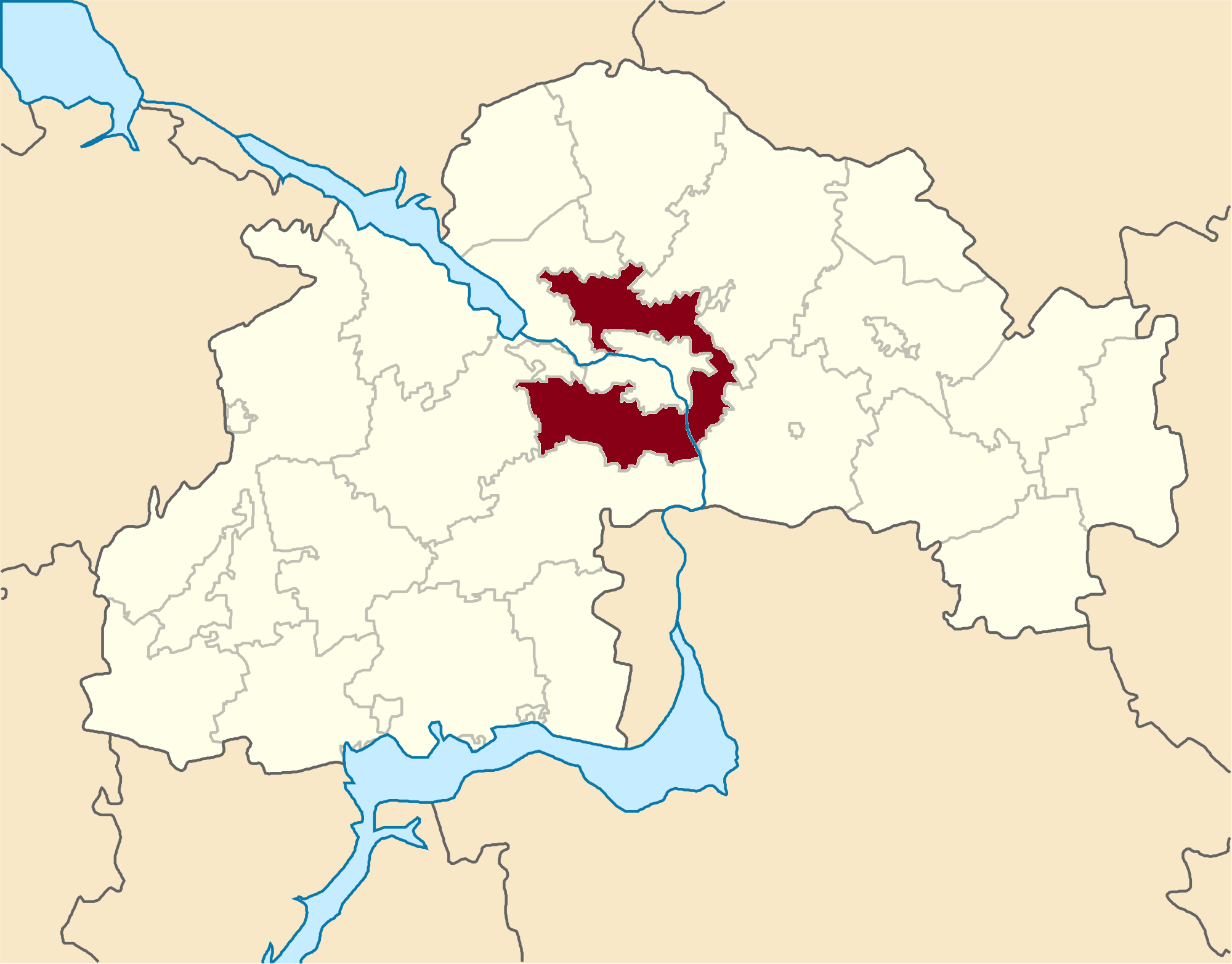
Dnipro Raion in Dnipropetrovsk Oblast before 2020

Before the 2020 reform, the raion consisted of eight hromadas:

- Chumaky rural hromada with the administration in Chumaky;
- Liubymivka rural hromada with the administration in Liubymivka;
- Mykolaivka rural hromada with the administration in Mykolaivka;
- Obukhivka settlement hromada with the administration in Obukhivka;
- Novooleksandrivka rural hromada with the administration in Novooleksandrivka;
- Pidhorodne urban hromada with the administration in Pidhorodne;
- Slobozhanske settlement hromada with the administration in Slobozhanske;
- Sursko-Lytovske rural hromada with the administration in Sursko-Lytovske.
