= Bohdanivka, Pavlohrad Raion, Dnipropetrovsk Oblast =

Rural locality in Dnipropetrovsk Oblast, Ukraine

Bohdanivka
- Location of Bogdanivka
- Coordinates: 48°29′56″N 36°06′26″E
- Country Oblast Raion: Ukraine; Dnipropetrovsk Oblast; Pavlohrad Raion
- Established: 1777
- Elevation: 100 m (330 ft)

Population (2001)
  - Total: 5,016
- Postal code: 51464
- Area code: ?

Bohdanivka (Ukrainian: Богданiвка; Russian: Богдановка) is a village near Ternivka in Pavlohrad Raion (district) of Dnipropetrovsk Oblast (province) in eastern Ukraine. Bohdanivka hosts the administration of Bohdanivka rural hromada, one of the hromadas of Ukraine. The village has 3000 inhabitants and has a coal mine named for Samara River nearby.

In April 1930 the village was the centre of a quickly defeated pro-Ukrainian anti-Soviet Union revolt.

The name Bohdanivka translates from Ukrainian word for God, bog combined with the suffix dano which translates to given, so is "given by God."
