= Yuriivka, Dnipropetrovsk Oblast =

Rural locality in Dnipropetrovsk Oblast, Ukraine

Yuriivka Юріївка
- Rural settlement
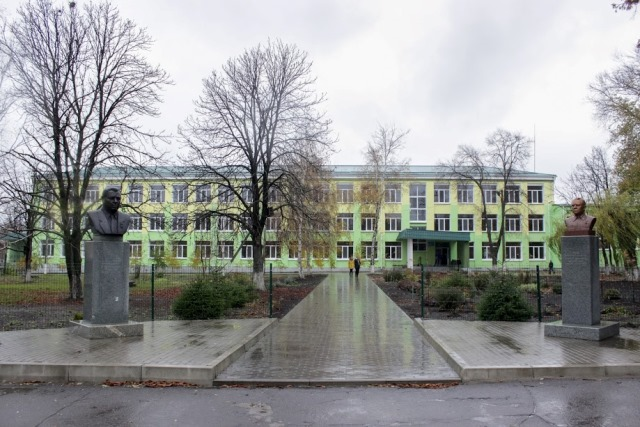

- Location within Ukraine Location within Dnipropetrovsk Oblast
- Coordinates: 48°44′08″N 36°00′54″E
- Country: Ukraine
- Oblast: Dnipropetrovsk Oblast
- Raion: Pavlohrad Raion
- Hromada: Yuriivka settlement hromada

Population (2022)
  - Total: 2,126
- Time zone: UTC+2 (EET)
  - Summer (DST): UTC+3 (EEST)

Yuriivka (Ukrainian: Юріївка), formerly known as Yurivka (Ukrainian: Юр'ївка; Russian: Юрьевка), is a rural settlement in Pavlohrad Raion, Dnipropetrovsk Oblast, Ukraine. It hosts the administration of Yurivka settlement hromada, one of the hromadas of Ukraine. Population: 2,126 (2022 estimate).

Yuriivka is located on the left bank of the Mala Ternivka River, a left tributary of the Samara River, itself a tributary of the Dnieper.

== History ==
Until 18 July 2020, Yurivka was the administrative center of Yurivka Raion. The raion was abolished in July 2020 as part of the administrative reform of Ukraine, which reduced the number of raions of Dnipropetrovsk Oblast to seven. The area of Yurivka Raion was merged into Pavlohrad Raion.

Until 26 January 2024, Yurivka was designated urban-type settlement. On this day, a new law entered into force which abolished this status, and Yurivka became a rural settlement.

In September 2024, Yurivka was renamed to Yuriivka as a part of the derussification campaign. The hromada was renamed accordingly on 26 November 2025.

== Economy ==
=== Transportation ===
Yuriivka is on the road connecting Pavlohrad and Lozova. In Pavlograd, it has access to the Highway M04 connecting Dnipro with Pokrovsk.

A railway connecting Pavlohrad and Lozova passes through Yuriivka. However, there is no passenger station in Yuriivka. The closest railway station is in Varvarivka, 2 kilometres (1.2 mi) to the southeast.
