= Pavlohrad Raion =

Subdivision of Dnipropetrovsk Oblast, Ukraine

Pavlohrad Raion Павлоградський район
- Raion
- Pavlohradskyi raion
- Flag Coat of arms

- Coordinates: 48°38′33″N 35°59′43.1″E
- Country: Ukraine
- Oblast: Dnipropetrovsk Oblast
- Admin. center: Pavlohrad
- Subdivisions: 7 hromadas

Area
  - Total: 2,420.9 km^{2} (934.7 sq mi)

Population (2022)
  - Total: 166,797
  - Density: 68.899/km^{2} (178.45/sq mi)
- Time zone: UTC+02:00 (EET)
  - Summer (DST): UTC+03:00 (EEST)
- Area code: +380

Pavlohrad Raion (Ukrainian: Павлоградський район) is a raion (district) of Dnipropetrovsk Oblast, southeastern-central Ukraine. Its administrative centre is located at the city of Pavlohrad. Population: 166,797 (2022 estimate).

On 18 July 2020, as part of the administrative reform of Ukraine, the number of raions of Dnipropetrovsk Oblast was reduced to seven, and the area of Pavlohrad Raion was significantly expanded. One abolished raion, Yurivka Raion, as well as Ternivka Municipality and the city of Pavlohrad, which was previously incorporated as a city of oblast significance and did not belong to the raion, were merged into Pavlohrad Raion. The January 2020 estimate of the raion population was 26,723 (2020 est.).

== Subdivisions ==
=== Current ===
After the reform in July 2020, the raion consisted of seven hromadas:

- Bohdanivka rural hromada with the administration in the selo of Bohdanivka, retained from Pavlohrad Raion;
- Mezhyrich rural hromada with the administration in the selo of Mezhyrich, retained from Pavlohrad Raion;
- Pavlohrad urban hromada with the administration in the city of Pavlohrad, transferred from the city of oblast significance of Pavlohrad;
- Ternivka urban hromada with the administration in the city of Ternivka, transferred from Ternivka Municipality;
- Troitske rural hromada with the administration in the selo of Troitske, retained from Pavlohrad Raion;
- Verbky rural hromada with the administration in the selo of Verbky, retained from Pavlohrad Raion;
- Yurivka settlement hromada with the administration in the rural settlement of Yuriivka, transferred from Yurivka Raion.

=== Before 2020 ===
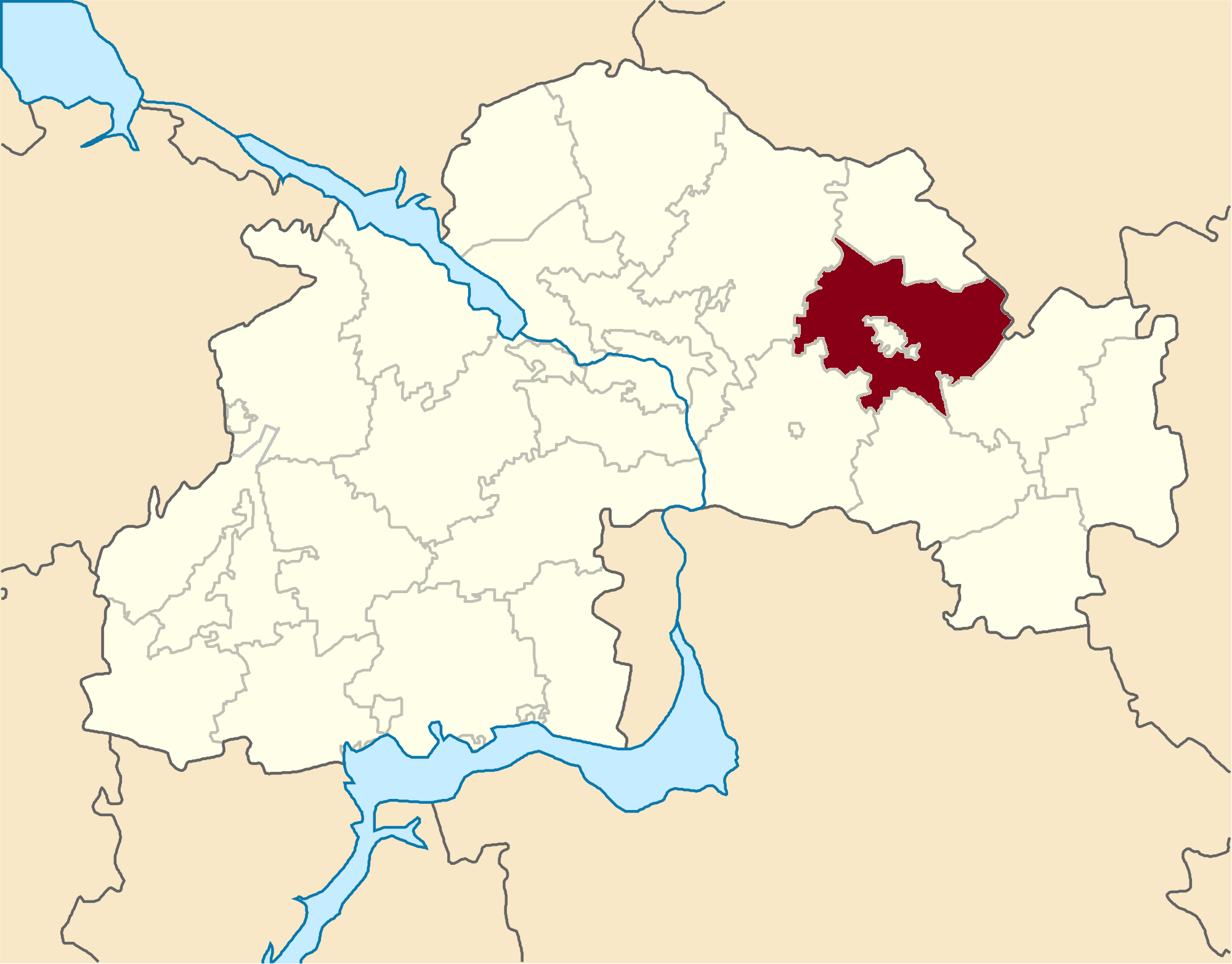
Pavlohrad Raion in Dnipropetrovsk Oblast before 2020

Before the 2020 reform, the raion consisted of four hromadas:

- Bohdanivka rural hromada with the administration in Bohdanivka;
- Mezhyrich rural hromada with the administration in Mezhyrich;
- Troitske rural hromada with the administration in Troitske;
- Verbky rural hromada with the administration in Verbky.
