= Yurivka Raion =

Former subdivision of Dnipropetrovsk Oblast, Ukraine

Yurivka Raion Юр'ївський район
- Raion
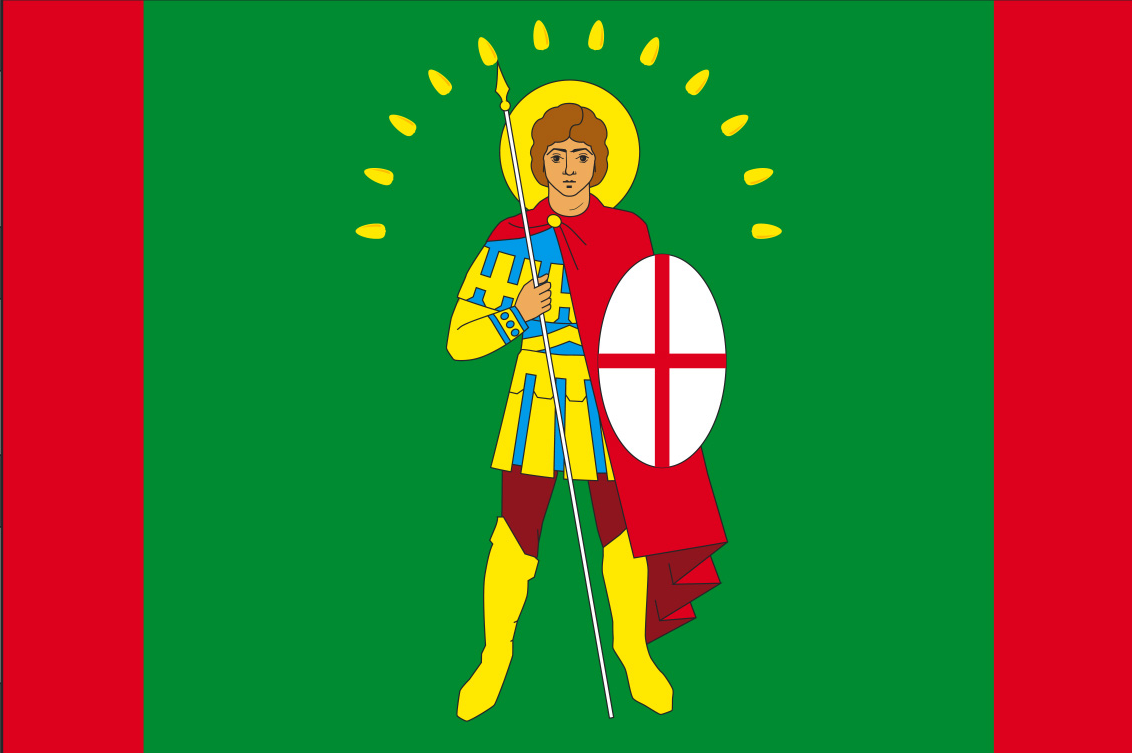
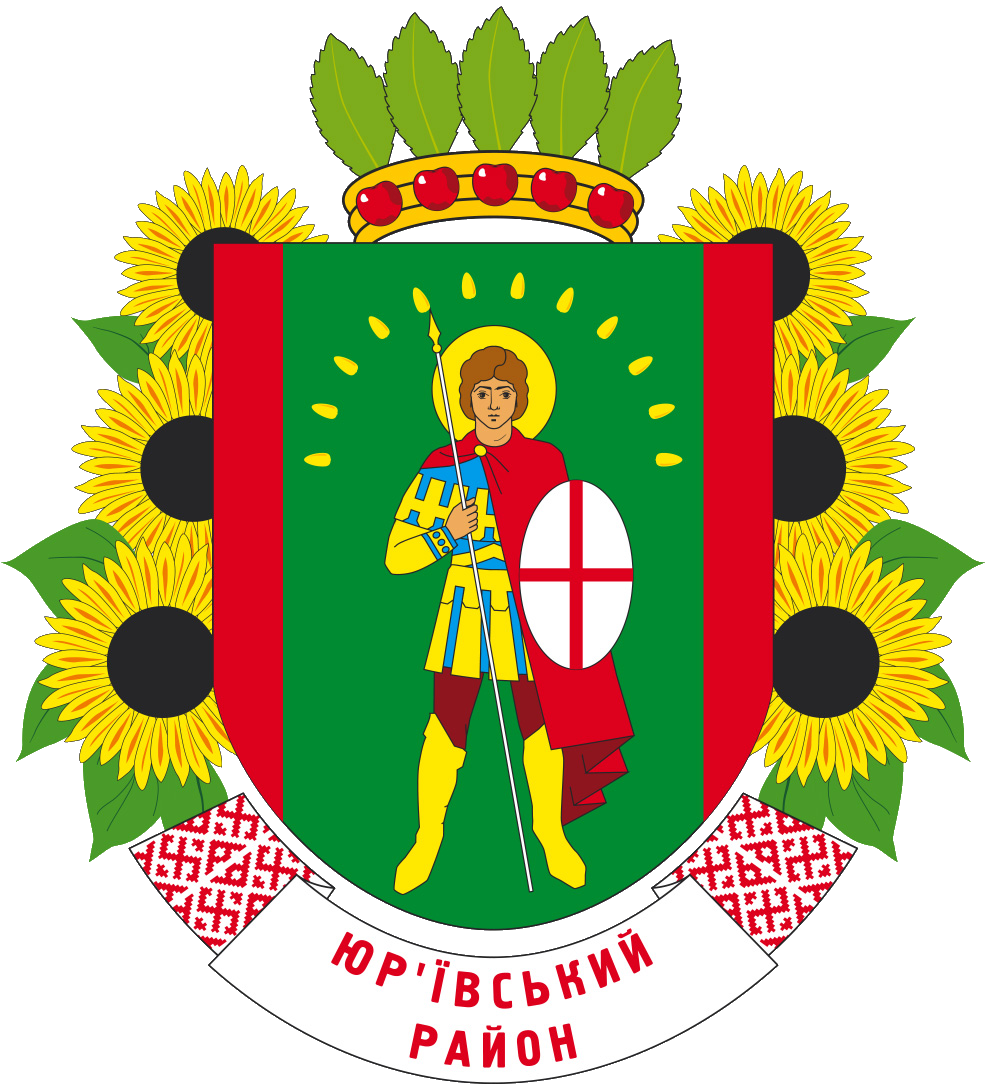
- Flag Coat of arms

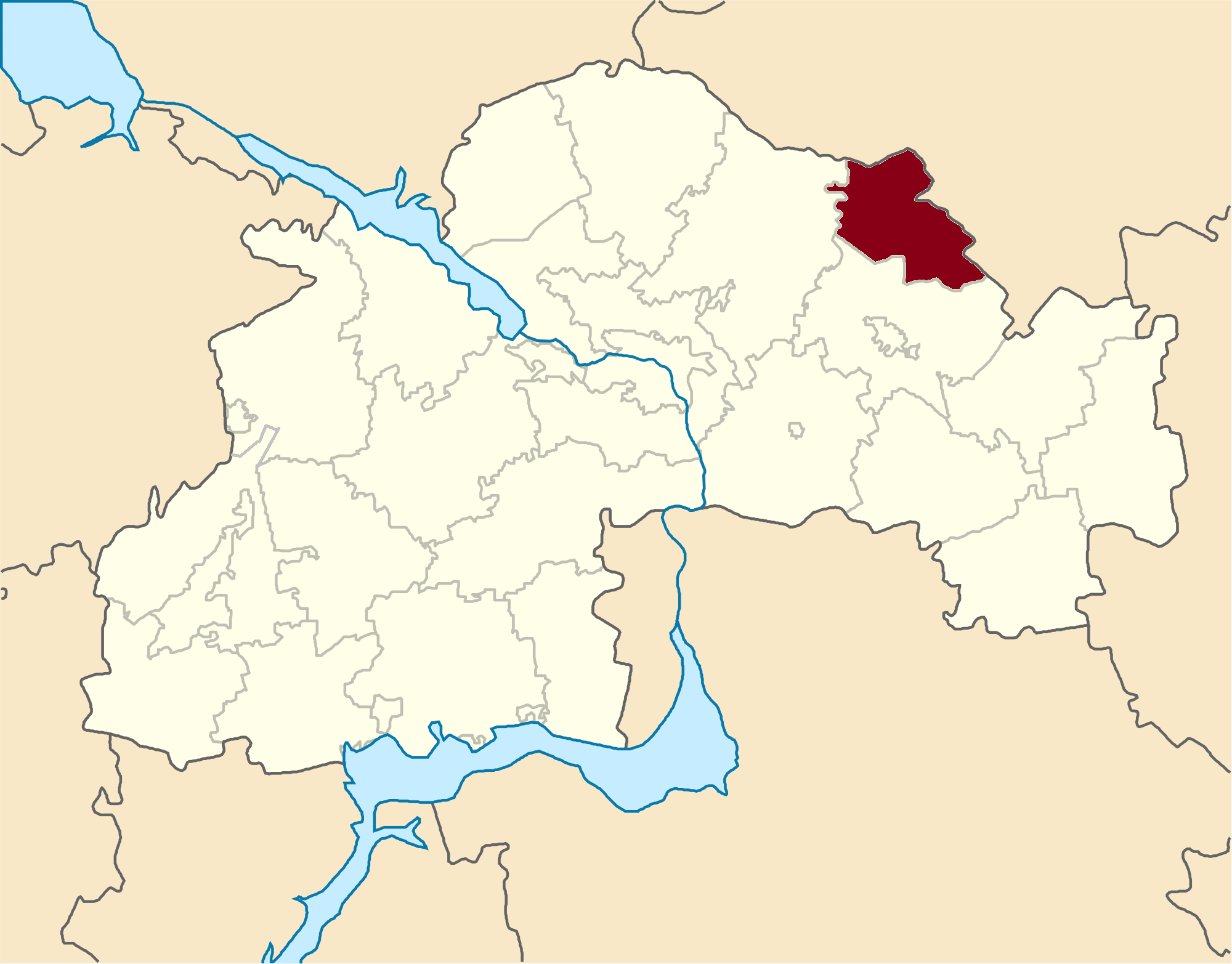
- Coordinates: 48°44′3″N 36°1′10″E
- Country: Ukraine
- Region: Dnipropetrovsk Oblast
- Disestablished: 18 July 2020
- Admin. center: Yurivka
- Subdivisions: List: — city councils; — settlement councils; — rural councils; Number of localities: — cities; — urban-type settlements; — villages; — rural settlements

Area
  - Total: 900 km^{2} (350 sq mi)

Population (2020)
  - Total: 12,643
  - Density: 14/km^{2} (36/sq mi)
- Time zone: UTC+02:00 (EET)
  - Summer (DST): UTC+03:00 (EEST)
- Area code: +380

Yurivka Raion (Ukrainian: Юр'ївський район) was a raion (district) of Dnipropetrovsk Oblast, southeastern-central Ukraine. Its administrative centre was located at the urban-type settlement of Yurivka. The raion was abolished on 18 July 2020 as part of the administrative reform of Ukraine, which reduced the number of raions of Dnipropetrovsk Oblast to seven. The area of Yurivka Raion was merged into Pavlohrad Raion. The last estimate of the raion population was 12,643 (2020 est.).

At the time of disestablishment, the raion consisted of one hromada, Yurivka settlement hromada with the administration in Yurivka.
