= Ternivka urban hromada =

Ternivka urban hromada Тернівська міська громада
- Hromada
- Interactive map of Ternivka urban hromada
- Country: Ukraine
- Oblast: Dnipropetrovsk Oblast
- Raion: Pavlohrad Raion
- Admin. center: Ternivka

Area
  - Total: 14.3 km^{2} (5.5 sq mi)

Population (2020)
  - Total: 27,650
  - Density: 1,930/km^{2} (5,010/sq mi)
- CATOTTG code: UA12120090000031622
- Settlements: 2
- Cities: 1
- Villages: 1

Ternivka urban territorial hromada (Ukrainian: Тернівська міська територіальна громада, romanized: Ternivska miska terytorialna hromada) is one of the hromadas of Ukraine, located in Pavlohrad Raion within Dnipropetrovsk Oblast. The administrative center is the city of Ternivka.

The area of the territory is 14.3 square kilometres (5.5 mi^{2}), the population of the hromada is 27,650 (2020).

== Composition ==
Hromada contains one city (Ternivka) and one village (Zelena Dolyna).

== History ==
Formed in 2020, in accordance with the order of the Cabinet of Ministers of Ukraine No. 709-r dated June 12, 2020 "On the determination of administrative centers and approval of territories of territorial communities of Dnipropetrovsk Oblast", with the territories and settlements of Ternivka City Council of Dnipropetrovsk Oblast.
