= Pavlohrad =

City in Dnipropetrovsk Oblast, Ukraine

Pavlohrad Павлоград
- City
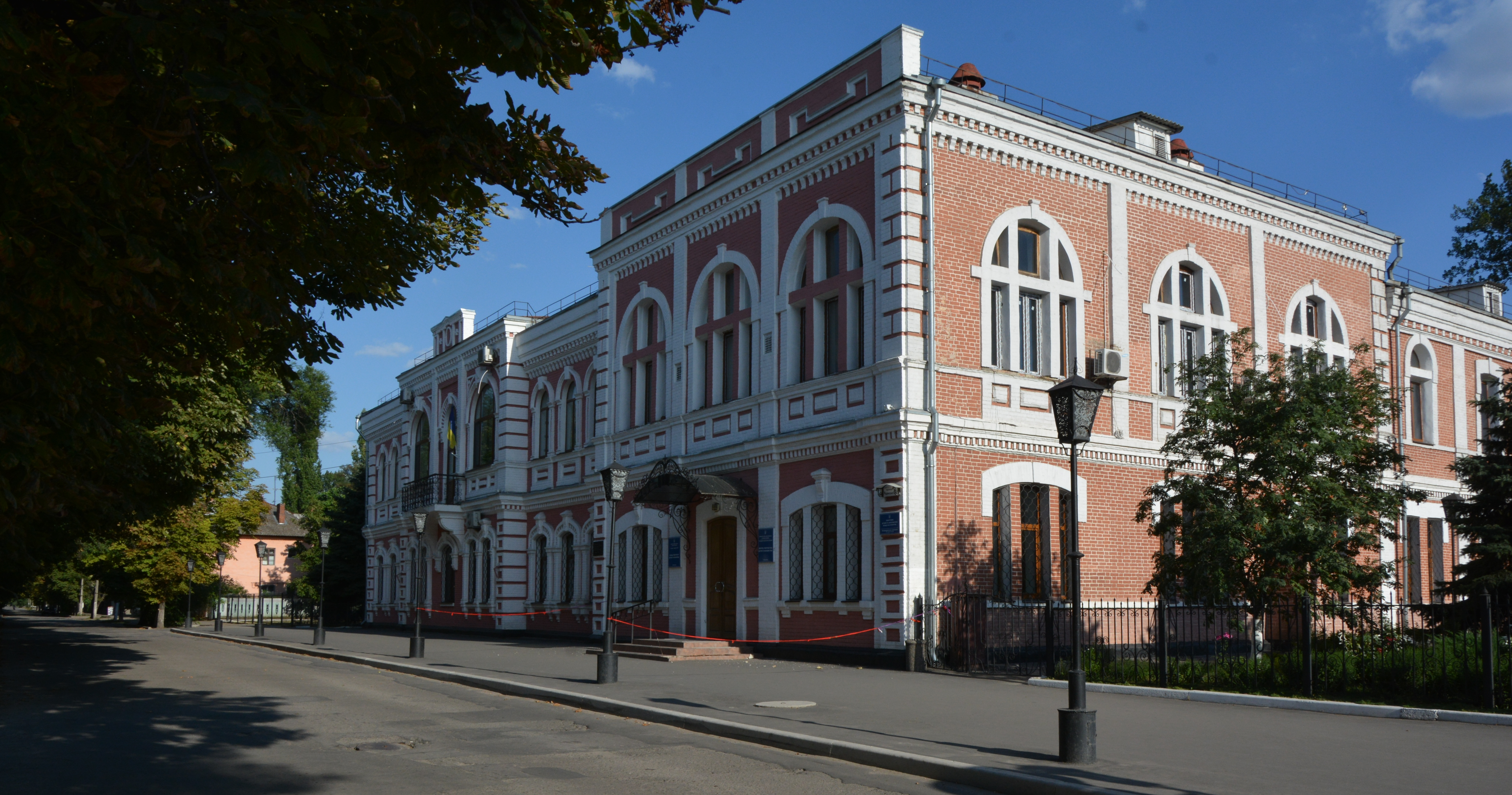
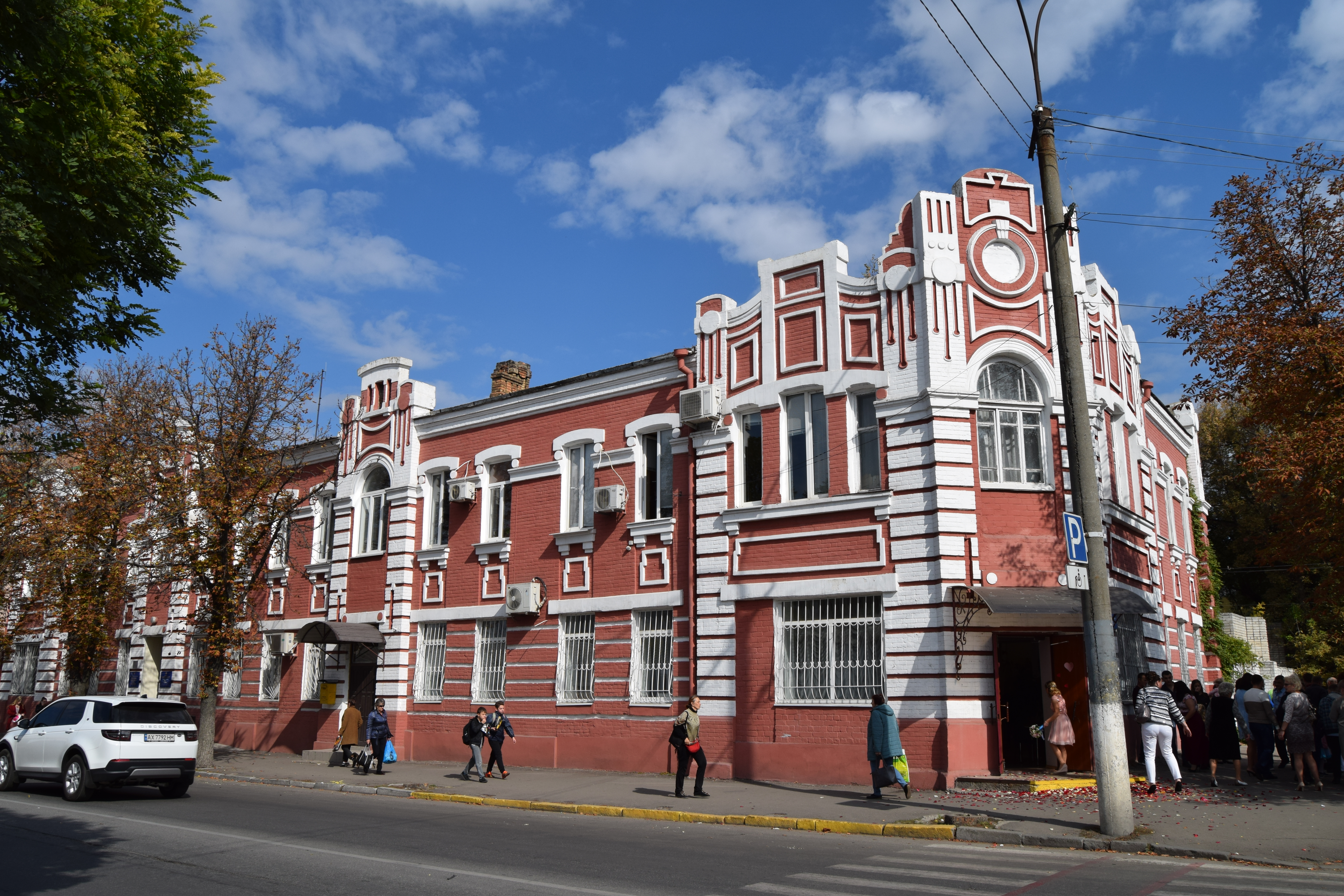
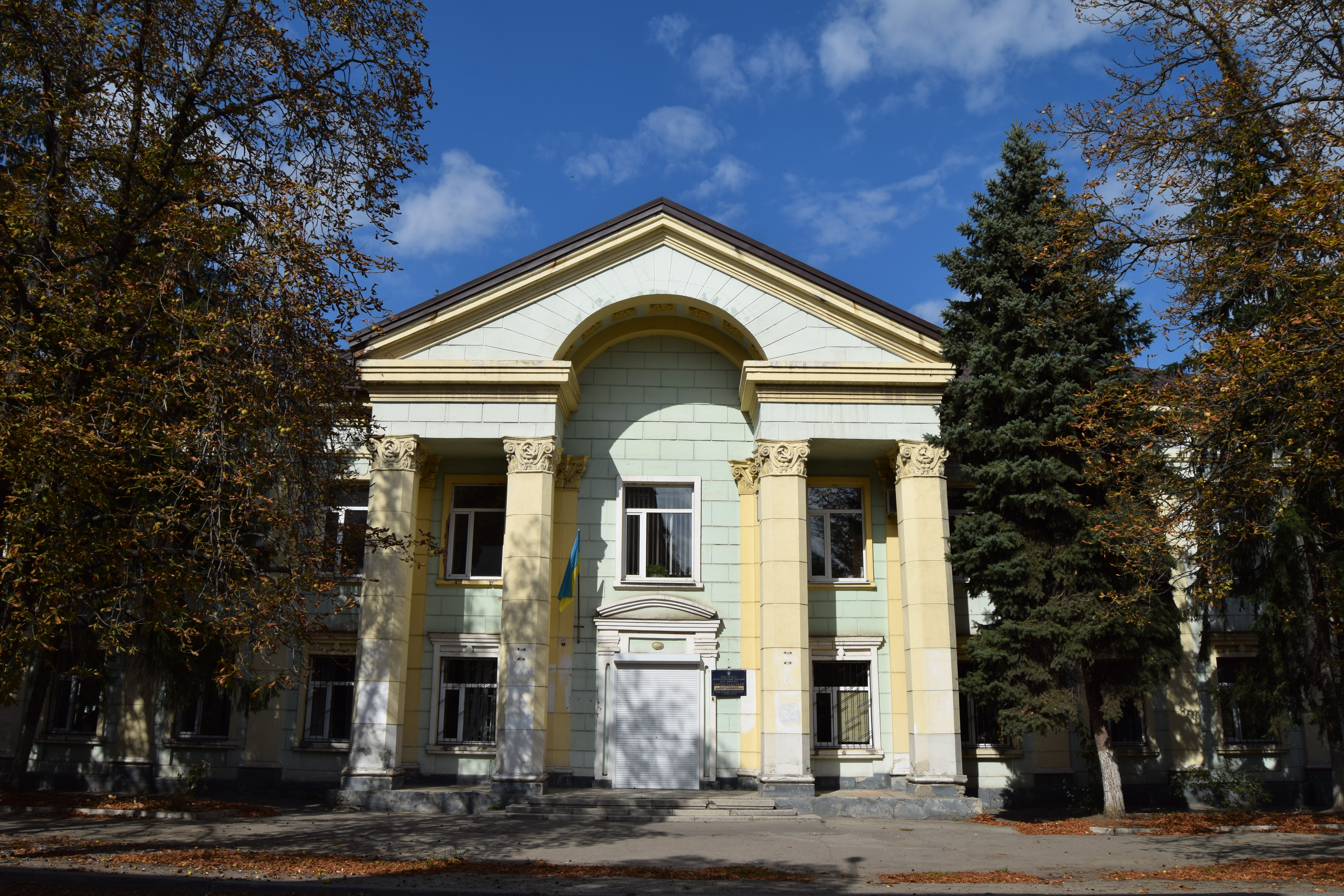
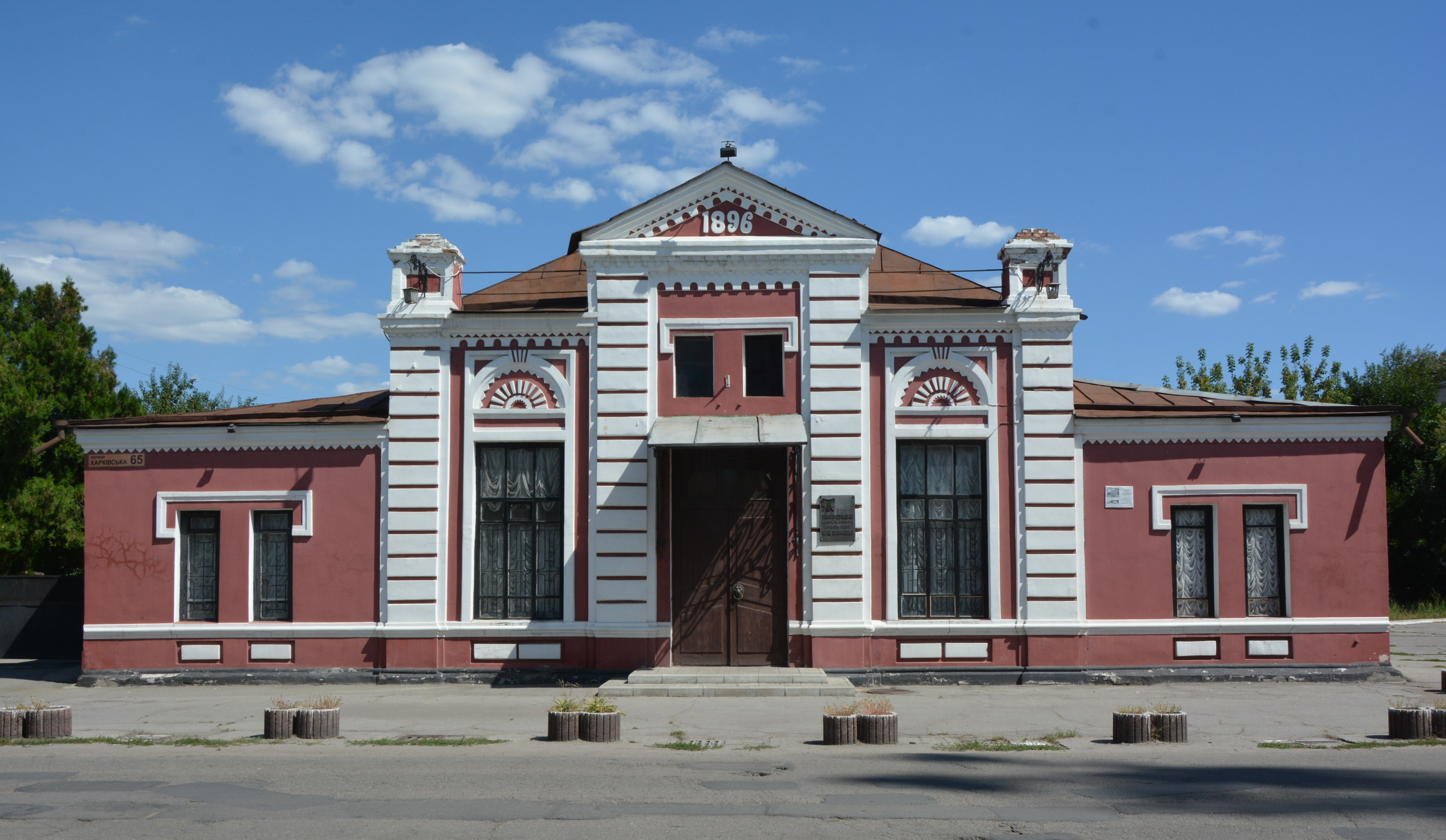
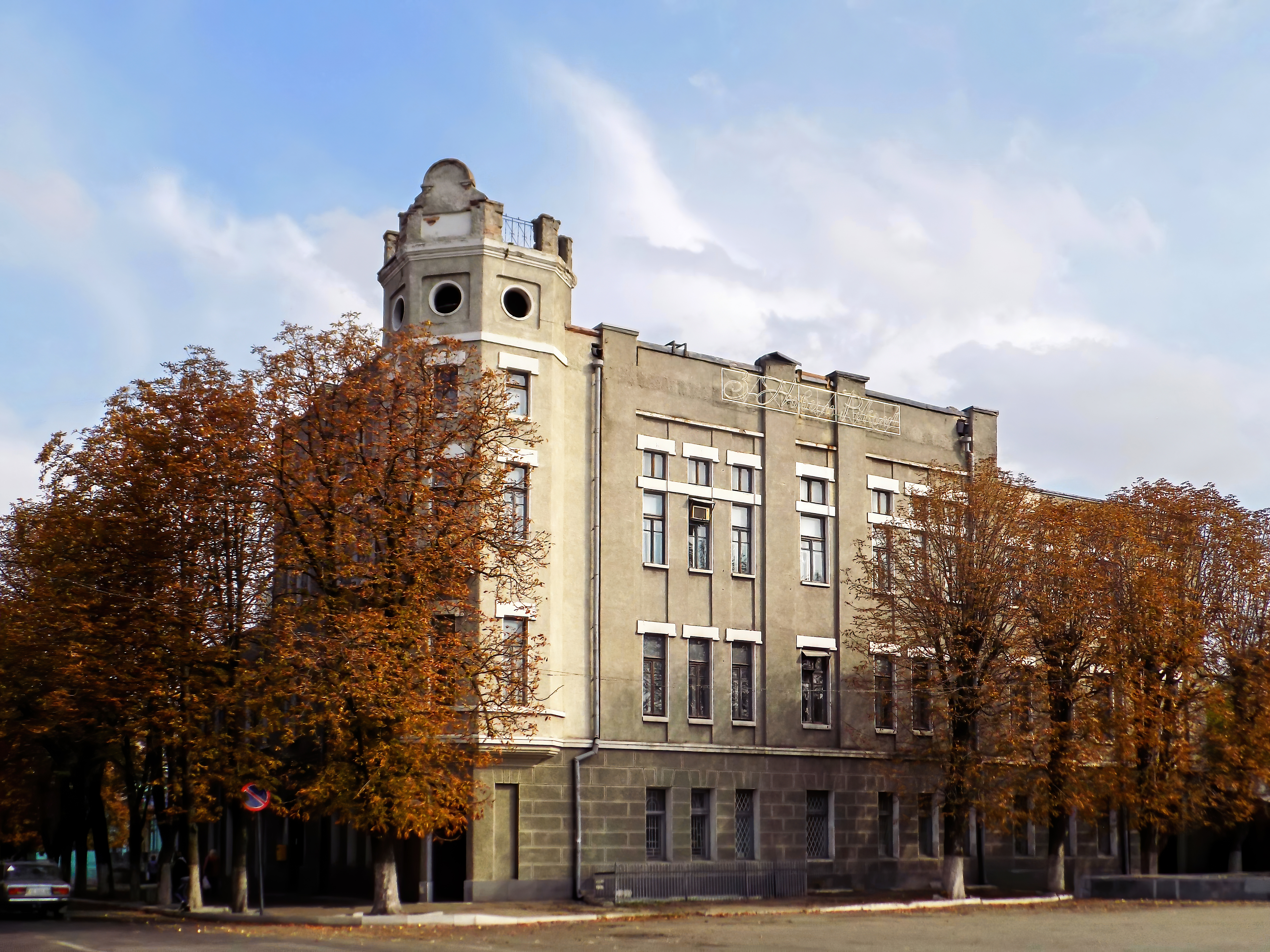
- Former girls' gymnasium Registry office Administration building Theater Post office

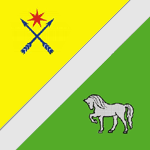
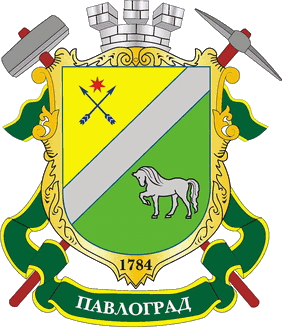
- Flag Coat of arms
- Interactive map of Pavlohrad
- Location within Dnipropetrovsk Oblast Location within Ukraine
- Coordinates: 48°31′0″N 35°52′0″E
- Country: Ukraine
- Oblast: Dnipropetrovsk Oblast
- Raion: Pavlohrad Raion
- Hromada: Pavlohrad urban hromada
- Established: 1779
- City rights: 1784

Government
  - Mayor: Anatoliy Vershina

Area
  - Total: 59.3 km^{2} (22.9 sq mi)
- Highest elevation: 71 m (233 ft)

Population (2024)
  - Total: 110,144
  - Density: 1,860/km^{2} (4,810/sq mi)
- Postal code: 51400-51429
- Area code: +380-5632
- Website: https://pavlogradmrada.dp.gov.ua

Pavlohrad (Ukrainian: Павлоград, pronounced [pɐu̯loˈɦrɑd]) is a city in central Ukraine, located within Dnipropetrovsk Oblast. It serves as the administrative center of Pavlohrad Raion. Its population is approximately 101,430 (2022 estimate).

The rivers of Vovcha (runs through the city 12.85 kilometres (7.98 mi) towards the Samara River), Hnizdka (3.9 kilometres (2.4 mi)), Kocherha (2.9 kilometres (1.8 mi)) flow through Pavlohrad. The area of the city is 59.3 square kilometres (22.9 sq mi). There are 15 schools (including lyceums and gymnasiums) in the city.

== History ==
Pavlohrad, one of the oldest modern settlements in Dnipropetrovsk Oblast, appears in documents from the 17th century. Pavlohrad is located in the territories known as the Free Lands of the Zaporizhian Host, which were dependent on the Polish-Lithuanian Commonwealth in the 16th and 17th centuries.

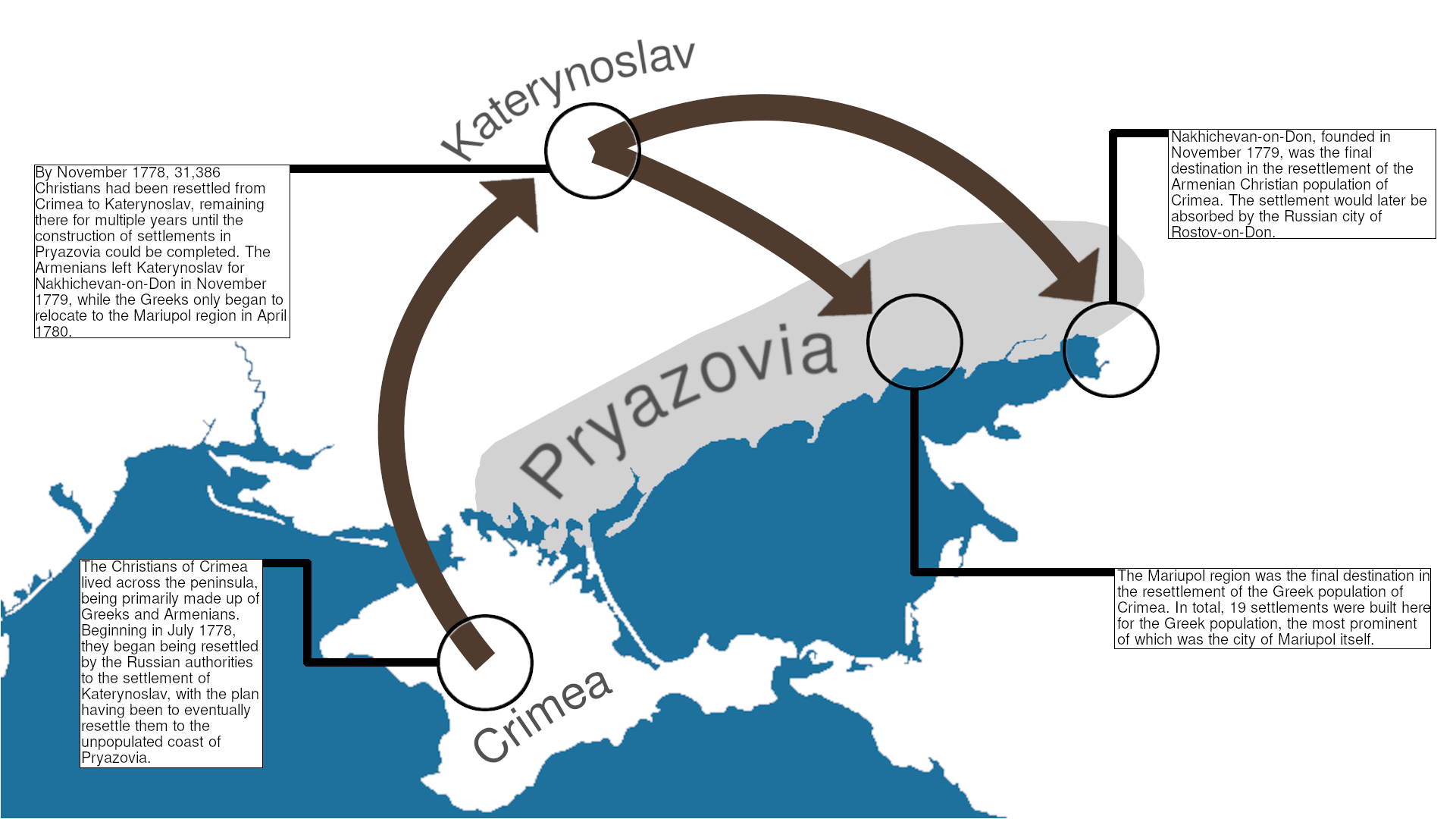
Map depicting the locations Greeks and Armenians were resettled

At the beginning of the 1770s, in Zaporozhian Sich Zaporozhian Cossack Matvii Khizhnyak built winter quarters, which soon became known as sloboda Matviivka (Ukrainian: Матвіївка) following the liquidation of the Zaporozhian Sich. In 1779, Matviivka became a headquarters of the Luhanske pikemen regiment headed by M. I. Golinishchev-Kutuzov and it was renamed Luhanske after the military unit. With the establishment of Yekaterinoslav Viceroyalty in 1783, the city became a part of this administrative unit as a district town, and then renamed to Pavlohrad. (Note: Some claim that it was renamed in honor of the Grand Duke Paul Petrovich (later Tsar Paul I, r. 1796–1801), though the city mayor in 2024 rejected this, claiming instead that the city was named in honor of Saint Paul.) The city renaming was connected to the deportation of the Crimean Greeks when they first moved to the former Samar palanka area of the Zaporizhian Sich. At first, it was planned to be renamed as Marionopol, but the deported Greeks refused to stay on the banks of the Vovcha river. With the help of Grigory Potyomkin, the Metropolitan Ignatius of Mariupol was able to get approval to be resettled near the coast of the Sea of Azov. The already existing city of Pavlovsk was renamed as Mariupol, while the planned city of Marionopol received the name of Pavlohrad. In 1784, Pavlohrad received city status.

There were 426 homes and 2419 inhabitants in the city at the end of the 18th century. The citizens of Pavlohrad lived in wattle and daub huts. The first stone building was the Holy Ascension Cathedral on Soborna Square. The first coat of arms of the city was affirmed on 29 July 1811, the second one on 26 September 1979. The first citizens were Cossacks of Samara and Kalmius Palankas and demobilized military. The city plan by Scottish architect W. Geste was affirmed by emperor Nicholas I on 31 July 1831.

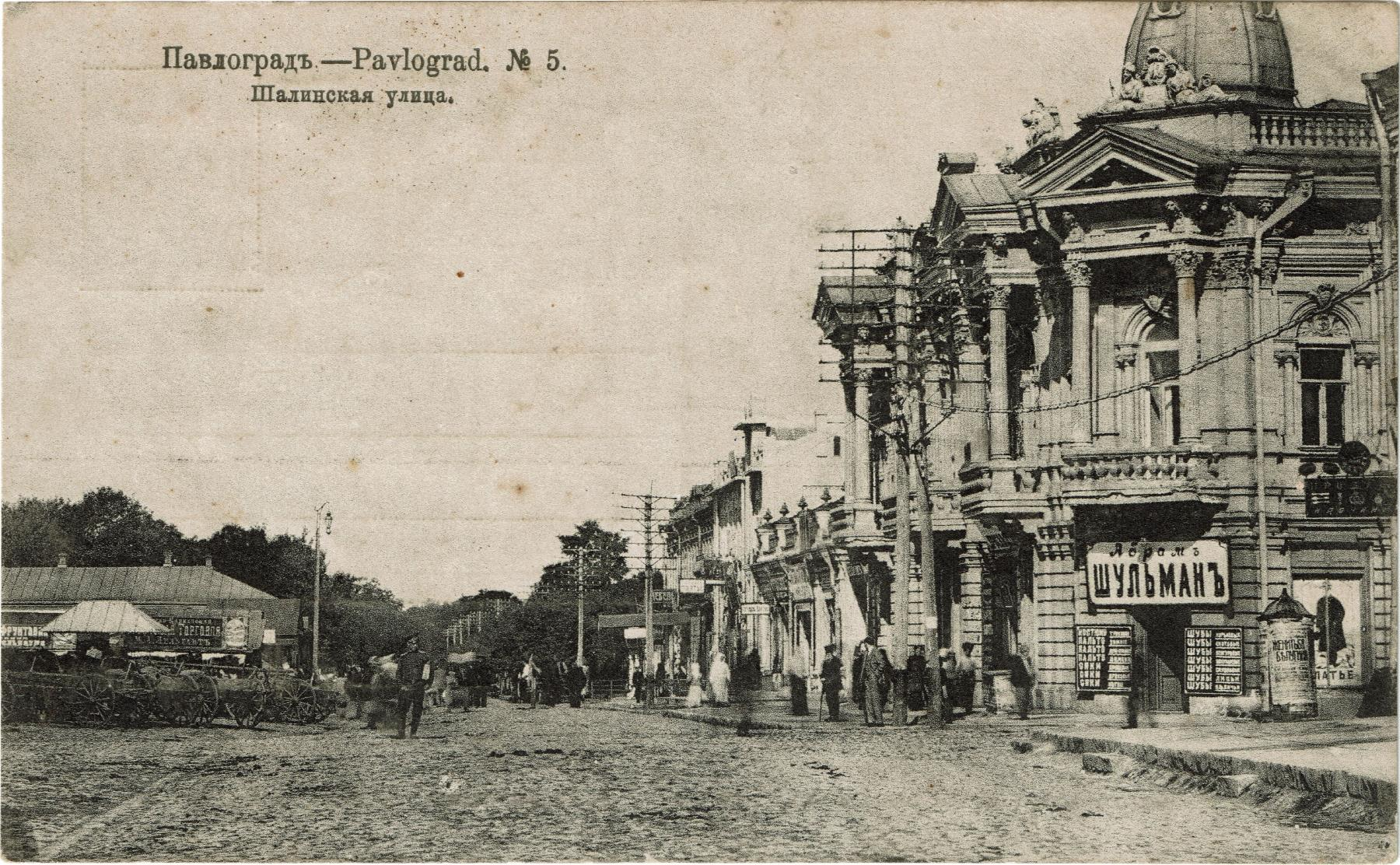
Early-20th-century view

In 1871, local merchant A.K. Shalin was elected the first head of the city. The central street was named after him (Shalinska Street), later renamed Leninska Street. In 2015, the Ukrainian government approved laws that outlawed communist symbols and street names. As of 2022 the street is named Soborna. Merchant of ІІ Guild A.V. Permanin was elected as city governor in 1892. Under his leadership the city started to develop rapidly: several churches, temples, barracks, gymnasiums, factories and plants were built.

In the 1870s, a railway connecting St. Petersburg and Simferopol passed through Pavlohrad. In 1896, the Golenishchev-Kutuzov family built the "Earl's Theatre".

During the Ukrainian War of Independence, from 1917 to 1920, it passed between various factions. Afterwards, it was administratively part of the Katerynoslav Governorate of Ukraine.

In 1930, an uprising against Soviet rule took place in Pavlohrad. From 1780 to 1941, a significant Jewish community existed in the city. The pre-Holocaust Jewish population was approximately 4,000.

=== World War II ===
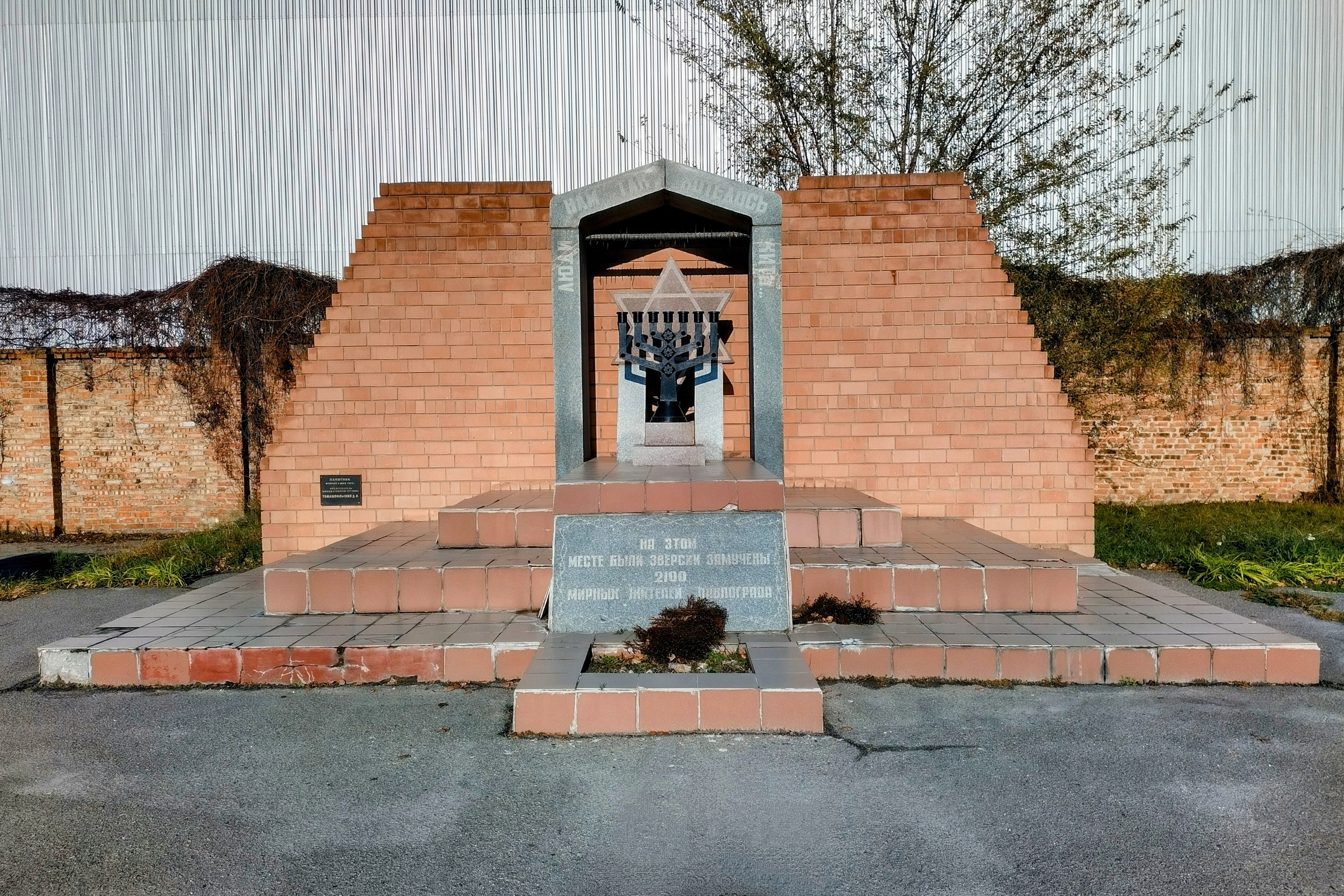
Holocaust memorial

The city was destroyed in 1941 during the German occupation. The German occupying forces operated the Dulag 111 and Dulag 124 transit prisoner-of-war camps and a Jewish ghetto in Pavlohrad. A large part of the community died during the war and during the mass executions. The Pavlohrad Jewish cemetery contains not only Jewish, but also Christian burials, which the leaders of the local Jewish community agreed to in 1995. On 22 May 2011 it was reported that unknown persons had desecrated the cemetery in the town - tombstones were turned over and broken in an apparently anti-Semitic act.

Following the German retreat in February 1943, the Wehrmacht recaptured Pavlohrad during a counteroffensive, planning to use the city as a base for a future attacks on the entire southern Red Army. This period was marked by the persecution of civilians, including arrests, executions, and forced labour.

=== Recent history ===
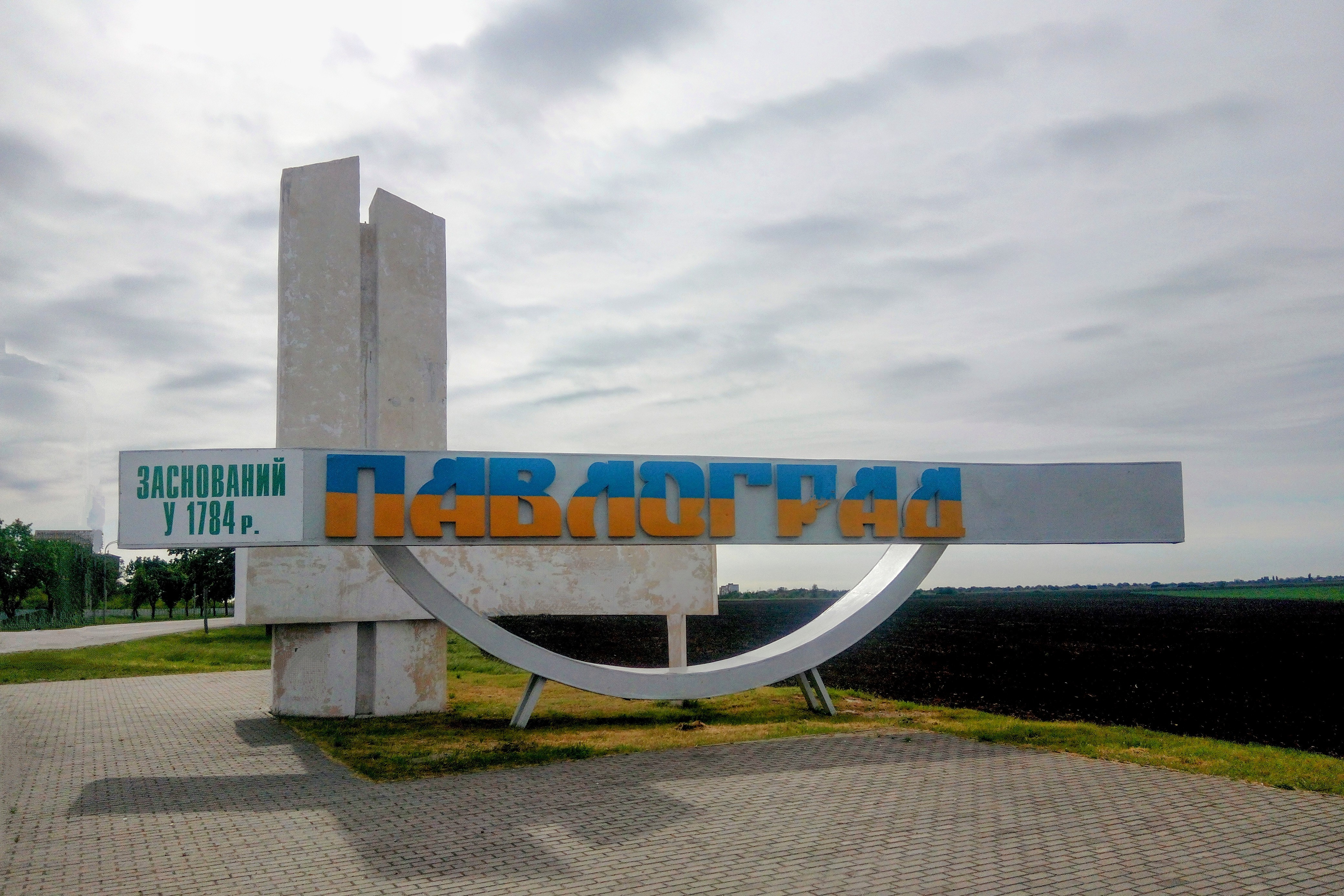

Until 18 July 2020, Pavlohrad was incorporated as a city of oblast significance and served as the administrative center of Pavlohrad Raion though it did not belong to the raion. In July 2020, as part of the administrative reform of Ukraine, which reduced the number of raions of Dnipropetrovsk Oblast to seven, the city of Pavlohrad was merged into Pavlohrad Raion.

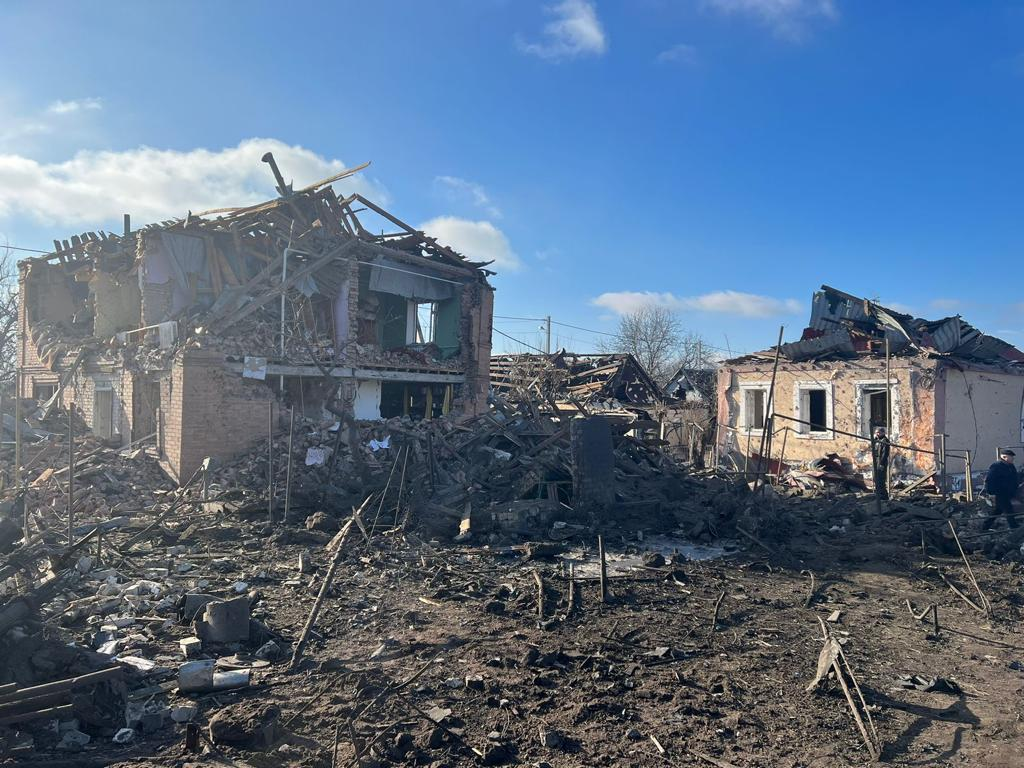
Pavlohrad after Russian shelling, 16 February 2023

During the 2022 Russian invasion of Ukraine, Pavlohrad — an important railway transportation hub — was subjected to Russian attacks. On 22 March, a missile strike destroyed the Pavlohrad-2 train station in the city, killing at least one person.

On 20 March 2024, the Committee on the Organization of State Power, Local Self-government, Regional Development, and Urban Planning in Verkhovna Rada stated their support for renaming the city to Matviiv (Матвіїв). On 9 October 2024, the proposed name Matviiv did not get enough votes in the Verkhovna Rada.

== Industry ==
The city is home to Pavlohrad Mechanical Plant (PMZ) that was established in December 1963 as a specialized production facility of the Plant no. 586 (now Pivdenmash Production Association). PMZ is a factory dedicated to assembly, perfection and production of solid-fueled rocket engines and missiles. By 1975, PMZ became the largest solid-rocket factory within the Ministry of General Machine Building of USSR. PMZ made fuel tanks for booster rockets and plastic ICBM rocket motor casings; parts, components, and assemblies for aerospace systems manufacturing.

On 30 April 2023, a Russian attack on Pavlohrad caused a series of large explosions and fires, injuring at least 34 civilians. Ukrainian sources reported that a plant was hit that produced solid fuel for Soviet-era rockets, and had a number of motors awaiting decommissioning.

Russian sources claimed that this attack disrupted the production of ammunition, weapons and military equipment for Ukrainian troops.

== Population ==
According to the 2001 Ukrainian census, the city's population was 119,672. Ukrainians accounted for 72.3% of the population and Russians for 25%. Ukrainian was the native language for 59.2% of the population, and Russian for 39.8%.

Ethnic groups in Pavlohrad
	percent
Ukrainians	72.26%
Russians	24.95%
Belarusians	0.67%
Gypsies	0.39%
Tatars	0.25%
Azerbaijanis	0.16%
Germans	0.15%
Armenians	0.15%
Ashkenazi Jews	0.12%
Moldovans	0.10%

== Gallery ==
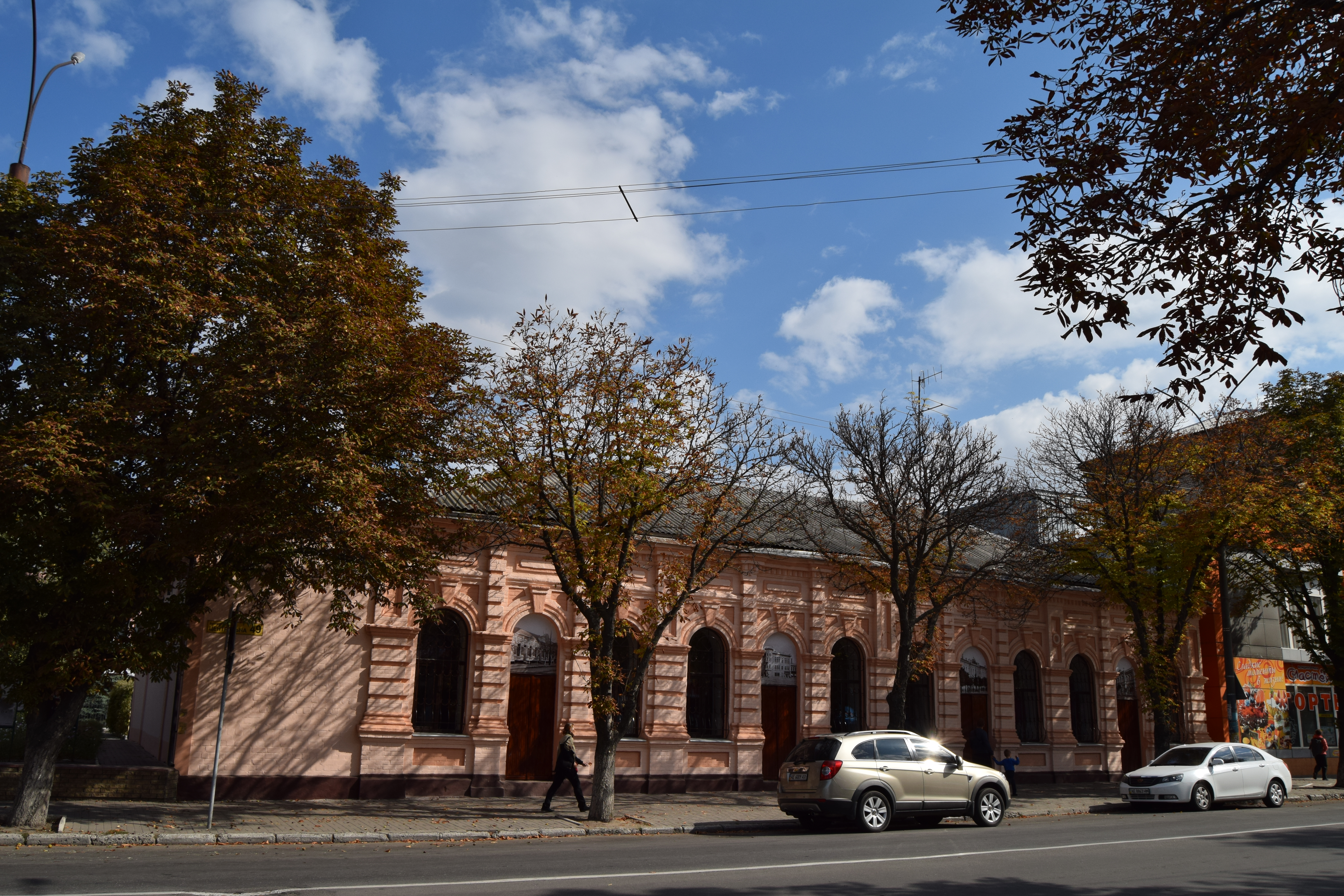
Municipal House of Culture

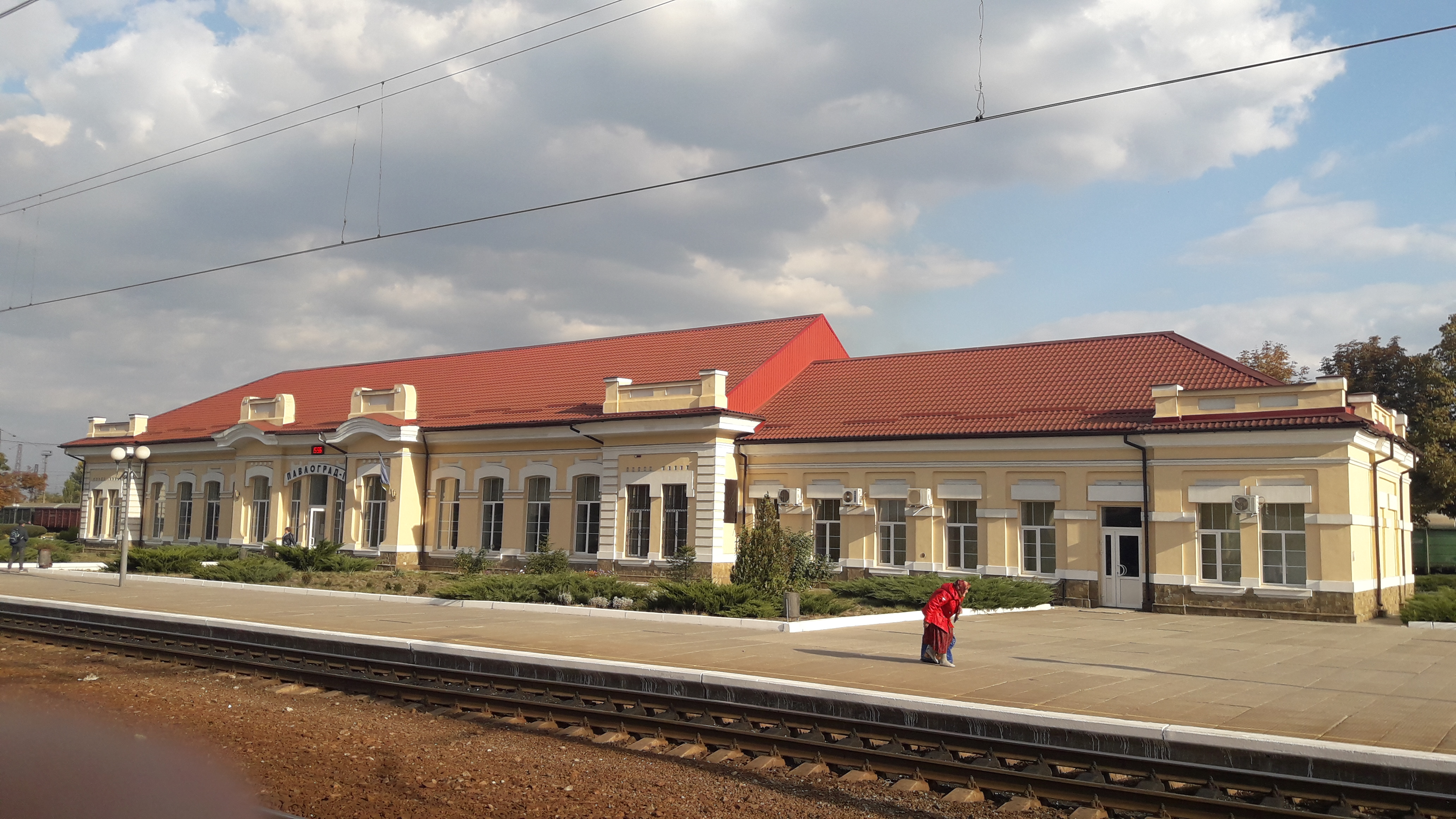
Pavlohrad railway station

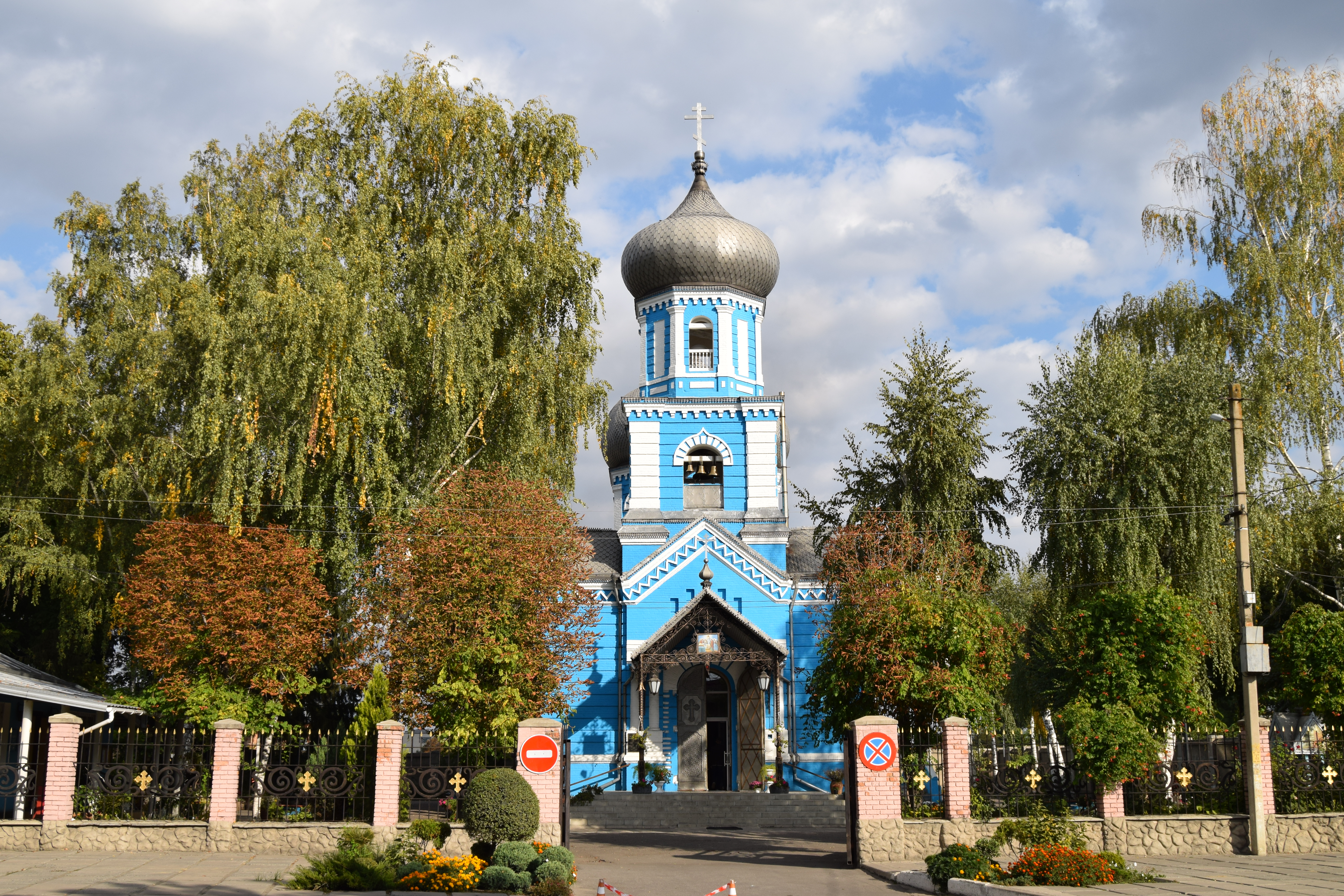
Dormition Cathedral

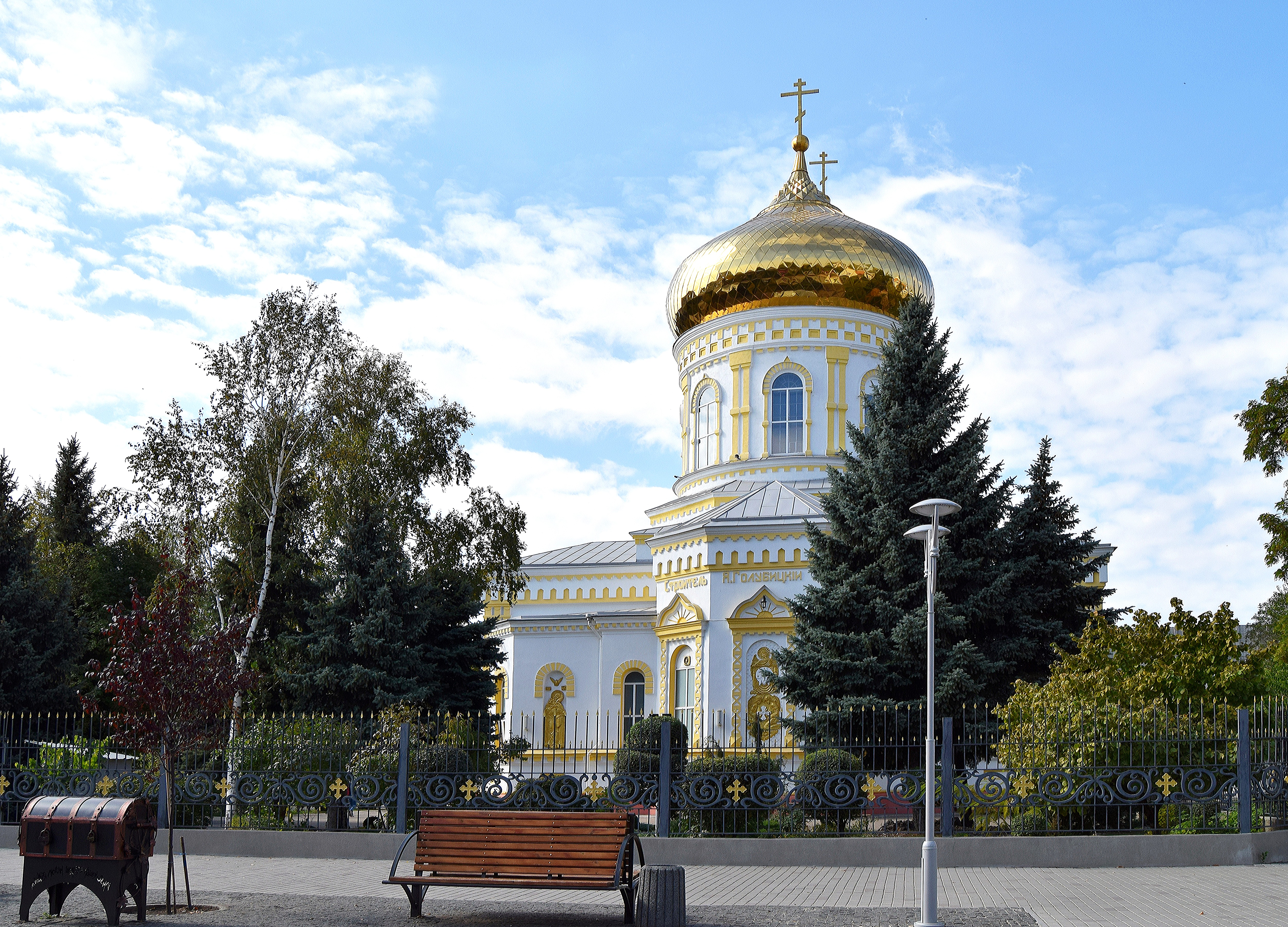
Vernicle Cathedral

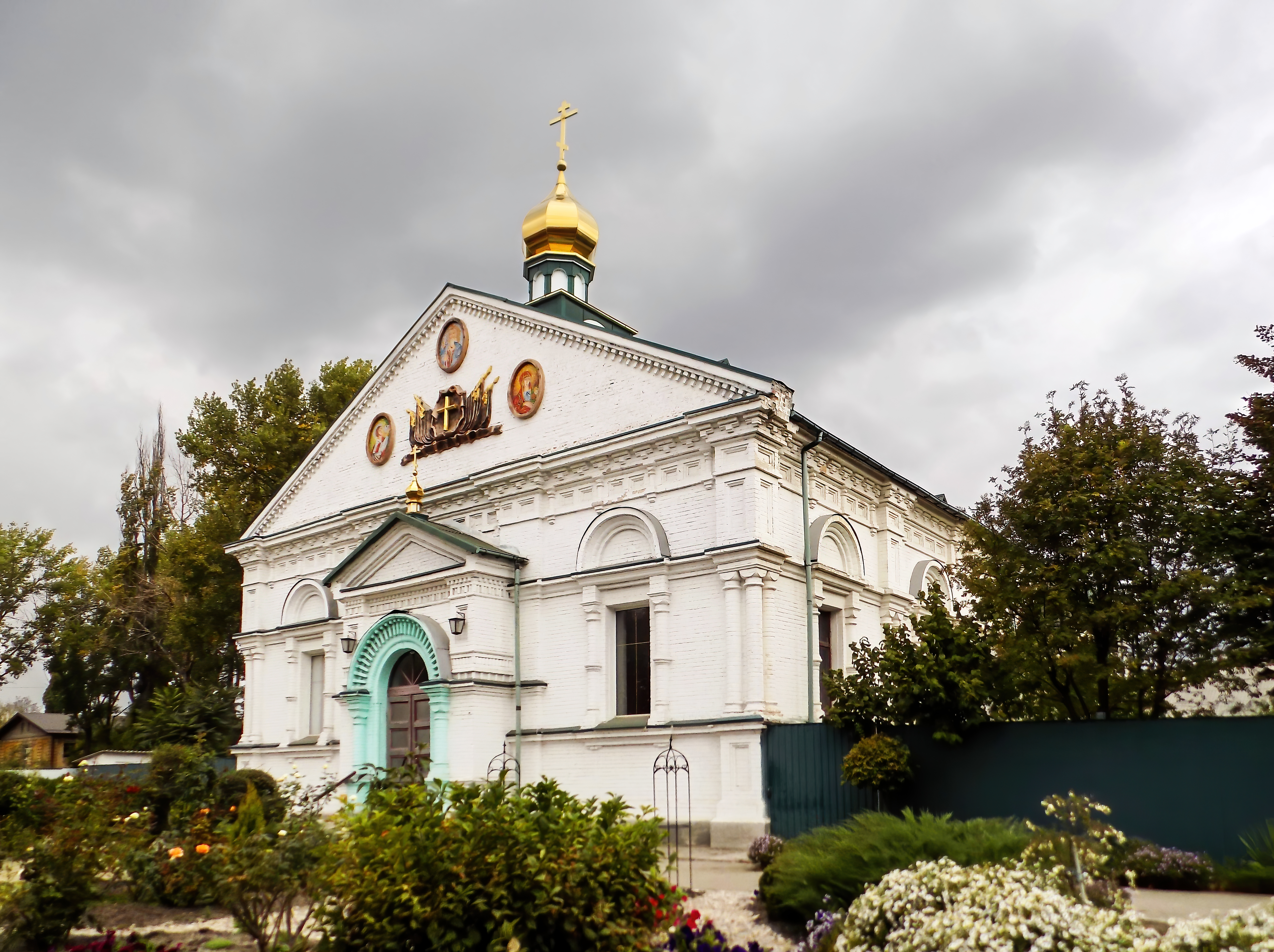
Holubytsky church

== Notable people ==
- Vadym Paramonov, footballer

== Twin towns ==
Pavlohrad is twinned with:

- Lubsko, Poland
- San Sebastián, Spain

== See also ==
- Mariupol
