= Ternivka =

City in Dnipropetrovsk Oblast, Ukraine

Ternivka Тернівка
- City
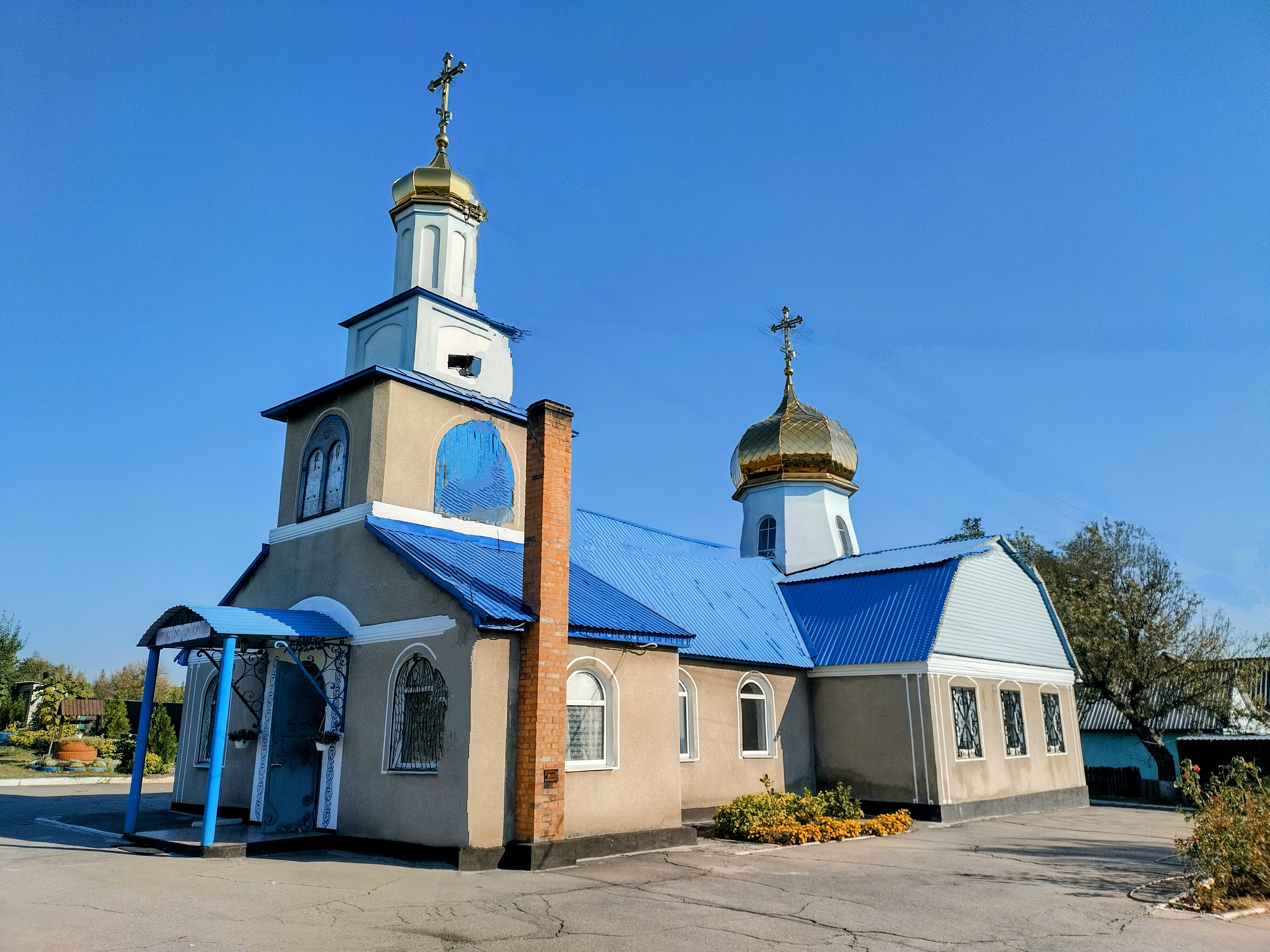
- Holy Ascension Church

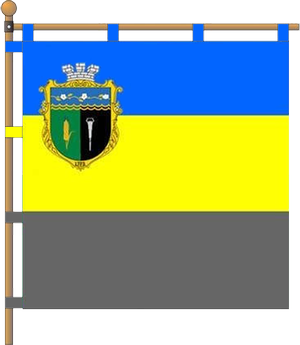
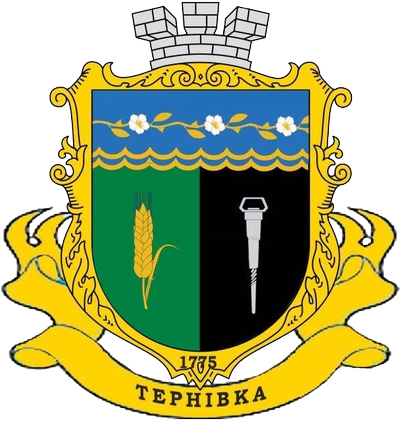
- Flag Coat of arms
- Interactive map of Ternivka
- Location of Ternivka Ternivka (Ukraine)
- Coordinates: 48°31′N 36°00′E
- Country: Ukraine
- Oblast: Dnipropetrovsk Oblast
- Raion: Pavlohrad Raion
- Hromada: Ternivka urban hromada
- Established: 1775
- City from: 1976
- Elevation: 100 m (330 ft)

Population (2022)
  - Total: 26,961
- Postal code: 51500
- Area code: +380-5636

Ternivka (Ukrainian: Тернівка, pronounced [terˈn⁽ʲ⁾iu̯kɐ]) is a city in Pavlohrad Raion, Dnipropetrovsk Oblast, in eastern Ukraine. It hosts the administration of Ternivka urban hromada, one of the hromadas of Ukraine. Population: 26,961 (2022 estimate). Population was 23,972 (2024).

== History ==
In April 1930 the village was the centre of a quickly defeated pro-Ukrainian anti-Soviet Union revolt.

In 1950, geologists discovered coal deposits in the villages of Ternivka and Bohdanivka, and in the fall of 1953, the experimental Ternivska No. 1 mine was laid. There was no electricity, no paved roads, no telephone service, and food was brought from Krasnoarmiisk and Pavlohrad. In 1953, two barracks were built near the village. In 1956, the village received electricity. By 1961, 8 thousand square meters of housing were built. In 1963, the first kindergarten was built.

In 1964, the first mine came into operation, and in the same year, by the decision of the Dnipropetrovs'k Regional Executive Committee, Ternivka was granted the status of an urban-type settlement. In 1965, construction of the Giant mine began. In 1975, a secondary school for 1176 students was built. In 1976, Ternivka received the status of a city, and since 1990 it has been a city of regional subordination.

Until 18 July 2020, Ternivka was incorporated as a city of oblast significance and the centre of Ternivka Municipality. The municipality was abolished in July 2020, as part of the administrative reform of Ukraine, which reduced the number of raions of Dnipropetrovsk Oblast to seven. The area of Ternivka Municipality was merged into Pavlohrad Raion.

== Industries ==
Coal mining. Ternivska, Zakhidno-Donbaska, Dniprovska and Samarska coal mines are located at the outskirts of Ternivka.

== Gallery ==
Samarska coal mine in Ternivka

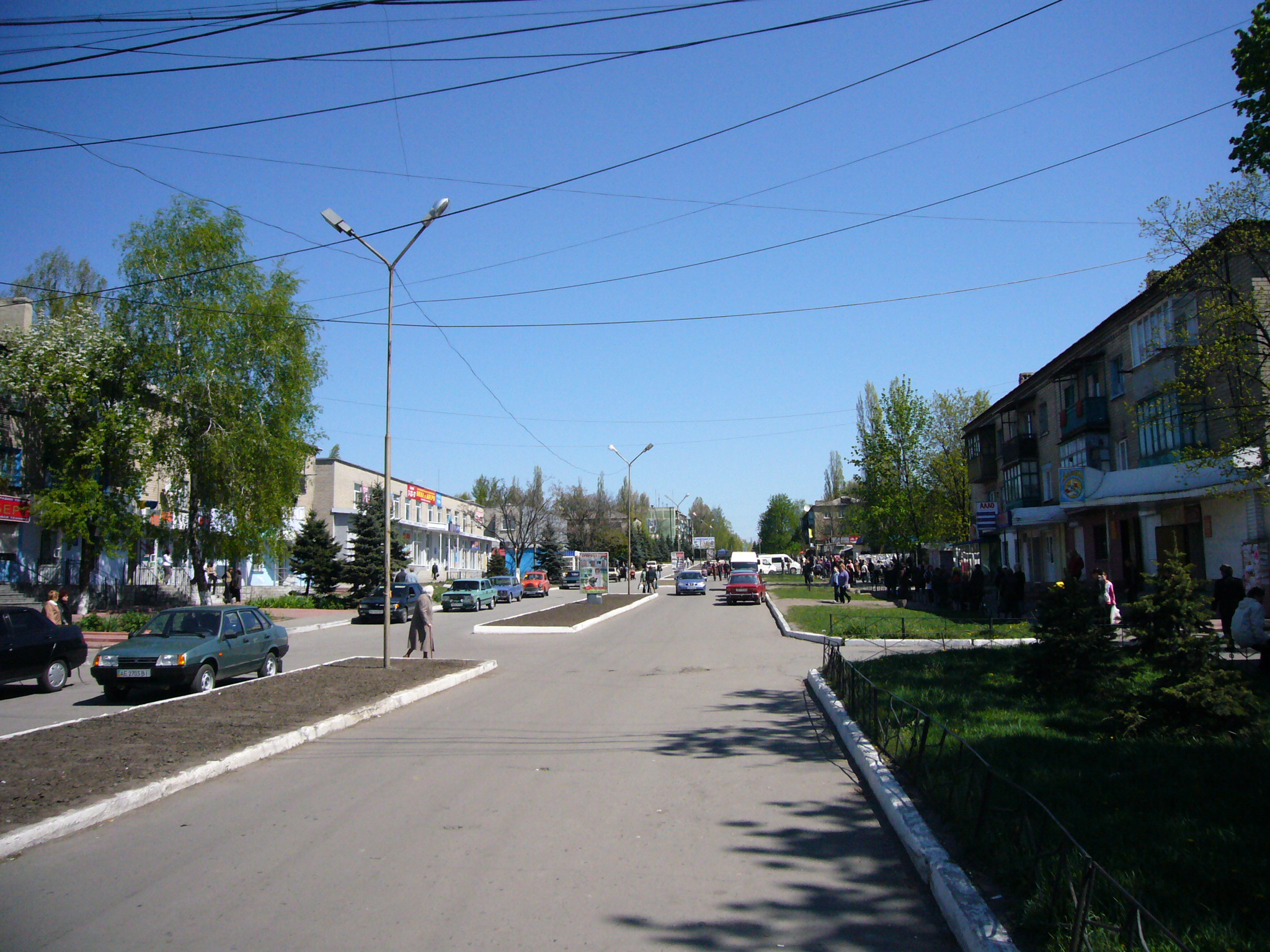
Central part of Ternivka

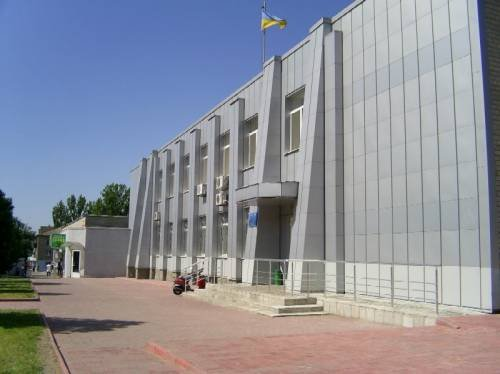
City Hall
