= Administrative divisions of Odesa Oblast =

Odesa Oblast is subdivided into districts (raions) which are subdivided into territorial communities (hromadas).

== Current ==
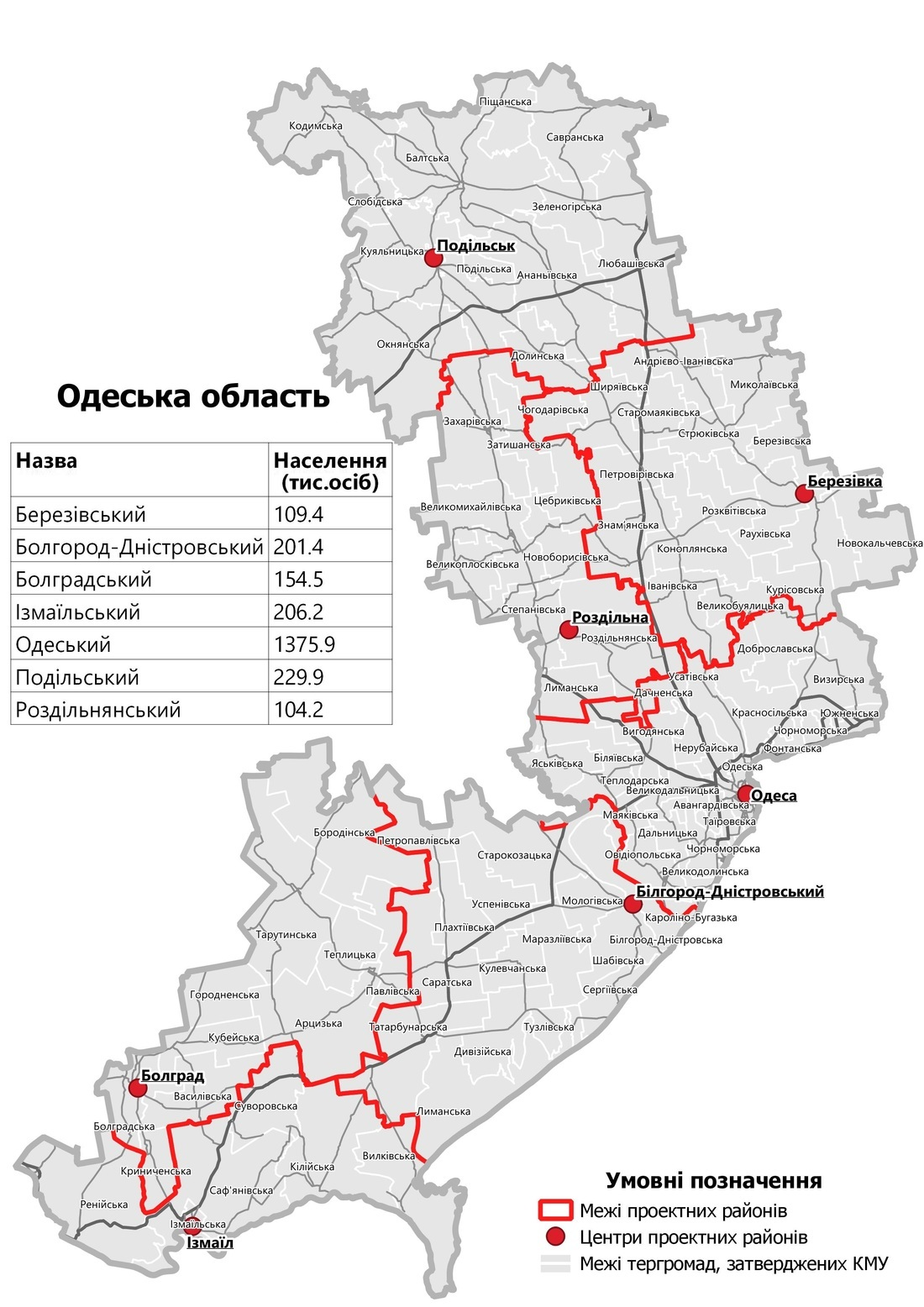
Raions of Odesa Oblast as of August 2020.

On 18 July 2020, the number of districts was reduced from 31 to seven (now incorporating also the 5 formerly separate city municipalities). These are:

1. Berezivka (Березівський район), the center is in the city of Berezivka;
2. Bilhorod-Dnistrovskyi (Білгород-Дністровський район), the center is in the city of Bilhorod-Dnistrovskyi;
3. Bolhrad (Болградський район), the center is in the city of Bolhrad;
4. Izmail (Ізмаїльський район), the center is in the city of Izmail;
5. Odesa (Одеський район), the center is in the city of Odesa;
6. Podilsk (Подільський район), the center is in the city of Podilsk;
7. Rozdilna (Роздільнянський район), the center is in the city of Rozdilna.

**Odesa Oblast**
As of January 1, 2022
Number of districts (райони)	7
Number of hromadas (громади)	91

=== Communities (hromadas) per District (raion) ===
In bold are communities (hromadas) with cities

Berezivka Raion

- **Berezivka**
- Chernove
- Chohodarivka
- Ivanivka
- Konopliane
- Kurisove
- Mykolayivka
- Novokalcheve
- Petrovirivka
- Raukhivka
- Rozkvit
- Shyriayeve
- Stari Mayaky
- Striukove
- Velykyi Buyalyk
- Znamyanka

Bilhorod-Dnistrovskyi Raion

- **Bilhorod-Dnistrovskyi**
- Dyviziya
- Karolino-Buhaz
- Kulevcha
- Lyman
- Marazliivka
- Moloha
- Petropavlivka
- Plakhtiivka
- Sarata
- Serhiivka
- Shabo
- Starokozache
- **Tatarbunary**
- Tuzly
- Uspenivka

Bolhrad Raion

- **Artsyz**
- Bessarabske
- **Bolhrad**
- Budzhak
- Horodnie
- Krynychne
- Kubei
- Pavlivka
- Teplytsia
- Vasylivka

Izmayil Raion

- **Izmayil**
- Katlabuh
- **Kiliya**
- **Reni**
- Safyany
- **Vylkove**

Odesa Raion

- Avanhard
- **Biliayivka**
- **Chornomorsk**
- Chornomorske
- Dachne
- Dalnyk
- Dobroslav
- Fontanka
- Krasnosilka
- Mayaky
- Nerubaiske
- **Odesa**
- Ovidiopol
- **Pivdenne**
- Tayirove
- **Teplodar**
- Usatove
- Velykodolynske
- Velykyi Dalnyk
- Vyhoda
- Vyzyrka
- Yasky

Podilsk Raion

- **Ananyiv**
- **Balta**
- Dolynske
- **Kodyma**
- Kuyalnyk
- Liubashivka
- Okny
- Pishchana
- **Podilsk**
- Savran
- Slobidka
- Zelenohirske

Rozdilna Raion

- Lymanske
- Novoborysivka
- **Rozdilna**
- Stepanivka
- Tsebrykove
- Velyka Mykhailivka
- Velykoploske
- Zakharivka
- Zatyshia

== Administrative divisions until 2020 ==
Raions of Odesa Oblast as of June 2020. The city of Odesa is shown in dark blue.

Before July 2020, Odesa Oblast was subdivided into 31 regions: 26 districts (raions) and 5 city municipalities (mis'krada or misto), officially known as territories governed by city councils.

- Cities under the oblast's jurisdiction:
  - Odesa (Одеса), the administrative center of the oblast
  - Balta Municipality
    - Cities under the city's jurisdiction:
      - Balta (Балта)
  - Bilhorod-Dnistrovskyi Municipality
    - Cities under the city's jurisdiction:
      - Bilhorod-Dnistrovskyi (Білгород-Дністровський)
    - Urban-type settlements under the city's jurisdiction:
      - Serhiivka (Сергіївка)
      - Zatoka (Затока)
  - Biliaivka Municipality
    - Cities under the city's jurisdiction:
      - Biliaivka (Біляївка)
  - Illichivsk Municipality
    - Cities under the city's jurisdiction:
      - Chornomorsk (Чорноморськ), formerly Illichivsk
    - Urban-type settlements under the city's jurisdiction:
      - Oleksandrivka (Олександрівка)
  - Izmail (Ізмаїл)
  - Podilsk (Подільськ), formerly Kotovsk
  - Teplodar (Теплодар)
  - Yuzhne (Южне)
- Districts (raions):
  - Ananiv (Ананьївський район)
    - Cities under the district's jurisdiction:
      - Ananiv (Ананьїв)
  - Artsyz (Арцизький район)
    - Cities under the district's jurisdiction:
      - Artsyz (Арциз)
  - Balta (Балтський район)
  - Berezivka (Березівський район)
    - Cities under the district's jurisdiction:
      - Berezivka (Березівка)
    - Urban-type settlements under the district's jurisdiction:
      - Raukhivka (Раухівка)
  - Bilhorod-Dnistrovskyi (Білгород-Дністровський район)
  - Biliaivka (Біляївський район)
    - Urban-type settlements under the district's jurisdiction:
      - Khlibodarske (Хлібодарське)
  - Bolhrad (Болградський район)
    - Cities under the district's jurisdiction:
      - Bolhrad (Болград)
  - Ivanivka (Іванівський район)
    - Urban-type settlements under the district's jurisdiction:
      - Ivanivka (Іванівка)
      - Petrivka (Петрівка)
      - Radisne (Радісне)
  - Izmail (Ізмаїльський район)
    - Urban-type settlements under the district's jurisdiction:
      - Suvorove (Суворове)
  - Kiliia (Кілійський район)
    - Cities under the district's jurisdiction:
      - Kiliia (Кілія)
      - Vylkove (Вилкове)
  - Kodyma (Кодимський район)
    - Cities under the district's jurisdiction:
      - Kodyma (Кодима)
    - Urban-type settlements under the district's jurisdiction:
      - Slobidka (Слобідка)
  - Liubashivka (Любашівський район)
    - Urban-type settlements under the district's jurisdiction:
      - Liubashivka (Любашівка)
      - Zelenohirske (Зеленогірське)
  - Lyman (Лиманський район), formerly Kominternivske Raion
    - Urban-type settlements under the district's jurisdiction:
      - Chornomorske (Чорноморське)
      - Dobroslav (Доброслав), formerly Kominternivske
      - Novi Biliari (Нові Білярі)
  - Mykolaivka (Миколаївський район)
    - Urban-type settlements under the district's jurisdiction:
      - Mykolaivka (Миколаївка)
  - Okny (Окнянський район), formerly Krasni Okny Raion
    - Urban-type settlements under the district's jurisdiction:
      - Okny (Окни), formerly Krasni Okny
  - Ovidiopol (Овідіопольський район)
    - Urban-type settlements under the district's jurisdiction:
      - Avanhard (Авангард)
      - Ovidiopol (Овідіополь)
      - Tairove (Таїрове)
      - Velykodolynske (Великодолинське)
  - Podilsk (Подільськ район), formerly Kotovsk Raion
  - Reni (Ренійський район)
    - Cities under the district's jurisdiction:
      - Reni (Рені)
  - Rozdilna (Роздільнянський район)
    - Cities under the district's jurisdiction:
      - Rozdilna (Роздільна)
    - Urban-type settlements under the district's jurisdiction:
      - Lymanske (Лиманське)
  - Sarata (Саратський район)
    - Urban-type settlements under the district's jurisdiction:
      - Sarata (Сарата)
  - Savran (Савранський район)
    - Urban-type settlements under the district's jurisdiction:
      - Savran (Саврань)
  - Shyriaieve (Ширяївський район)
    - Urban-type settlements under the district's jurisdiction:
      - Shyriaieve (Ширяєве)
  - Tarutyne (Тарутинський район)
    - Urban-type settlements under the district's jurisdiction:
      - Berezyne (Березине)
      - Borodino (Бородіно)
      - Serpneve (Серпневе)
      - Tarutyne (Тарутине)
  - Tatarbunary (Татарбунарський район)
    - Cities under the district's jurisdiction:
      - Tatarbunary (Татарбунари)
  - Velyka Mykhailivka (Великомихайлівський район)
    - Urban-type settlements under the district's jurisdiction:
      - Tsebrykove (Цебрикове)
      - Velyka Mykhailivka (Велика Михайлівка)
  - Zakharivka (Захарівський район), formerly Frunzivka Raion
    - Urban-type settlements under the district's jurisdiction:
      - Zakharivka (Захарівка), formerly Frunzivka
      - Zatyshshia (Затишшя)
