= List of cities in Odesa Oblast =

Location of cities in Odesa Oblast

There are 19 populated places in Odesa Oblast, Ukraine, that have been officially granted city status (Ukrainian: місто, romanized: misto) by the Verkhovna Rada, the country's parliament. Settlements with more than 10,000 people are eligible for city status, although the status is typically also granted to settlements of historical or regional importance. As of 5 December 2001, the date of the first and only official census in the country since independence, (Note: As of 11 July 2023) the most populous city in the oblast was the regional capital, Odesa, with a population of 1,029,049 people, while the least populous city was Teplodar, with 8,830 people. After the enactment of decommunization laws, two cities within the oblast were renamed in 2016 for their former names' connection to people, places, events, and organizations associated with the Soviet Union. The renamed cities Chornomorsk and Podilsk were previously named Illichivsk and Kotovsk, respectively. In 2024, following the passage of derussification laws, the city of Yuzhne was renamed Pivdenne.

From independence in 1991 to 2020, nine cities in the oblast were designated as cities of regional significance (municipalities), which had self-government under city councils, while the oblast's remaining ten cities were located amongst twenty-six raions (districts) as cities of district significance, which are subordinated to the governments of the raions. On 18 July 2020, an administrative reform abolished and merged the oblast's raions and cities of regional significance into seven new, expanded raions. The seven raions that make up the oblast are Berezivka, Bilhorod-Dnistrovskyi, Bolhrad, Izmail, Odesa, Podilsk, and Rozdilna.

One city in the oblast, the regional capital Odesa, was awarded by Soviet officials with the honorary title Hero City of Ukraine in 1965 for its resistance to the Axis invasion of the Soviet Union during World War II; the title was renewed in 2022 by Ukrainian President Volodymyr Zelenskyy. The city has also been recognized by UNESCO as one of Ukraine's eight World Heritage Sites since 25 January 2023. Due to Russia's full-scale invasion of Ukraine, since 24 February 2022, the oblast's Black Sea ports of Chornomorsk, Odesa, and Pivdennyi Port (located close to Pivdenne), together with its Danube river ports of Izmail, Reni, and Ust-Danube (located in Vylkove and Kiliia), (Note: The Port of Kiliia has been owned and operated by the Ust-Danube Port Authority since 1998. Vylkove's port serves as the administrative headquarters for Ust-Danube.) have served as the primary route for Ukraine's international shipping. Frequent Russian airstrikes have inflicted significant damage to cities in the oblast, particularly Odesa, the historic center of which was added on UNESCO's List of World Heritage in Danger immediately following its recognition.

== List of cities ==
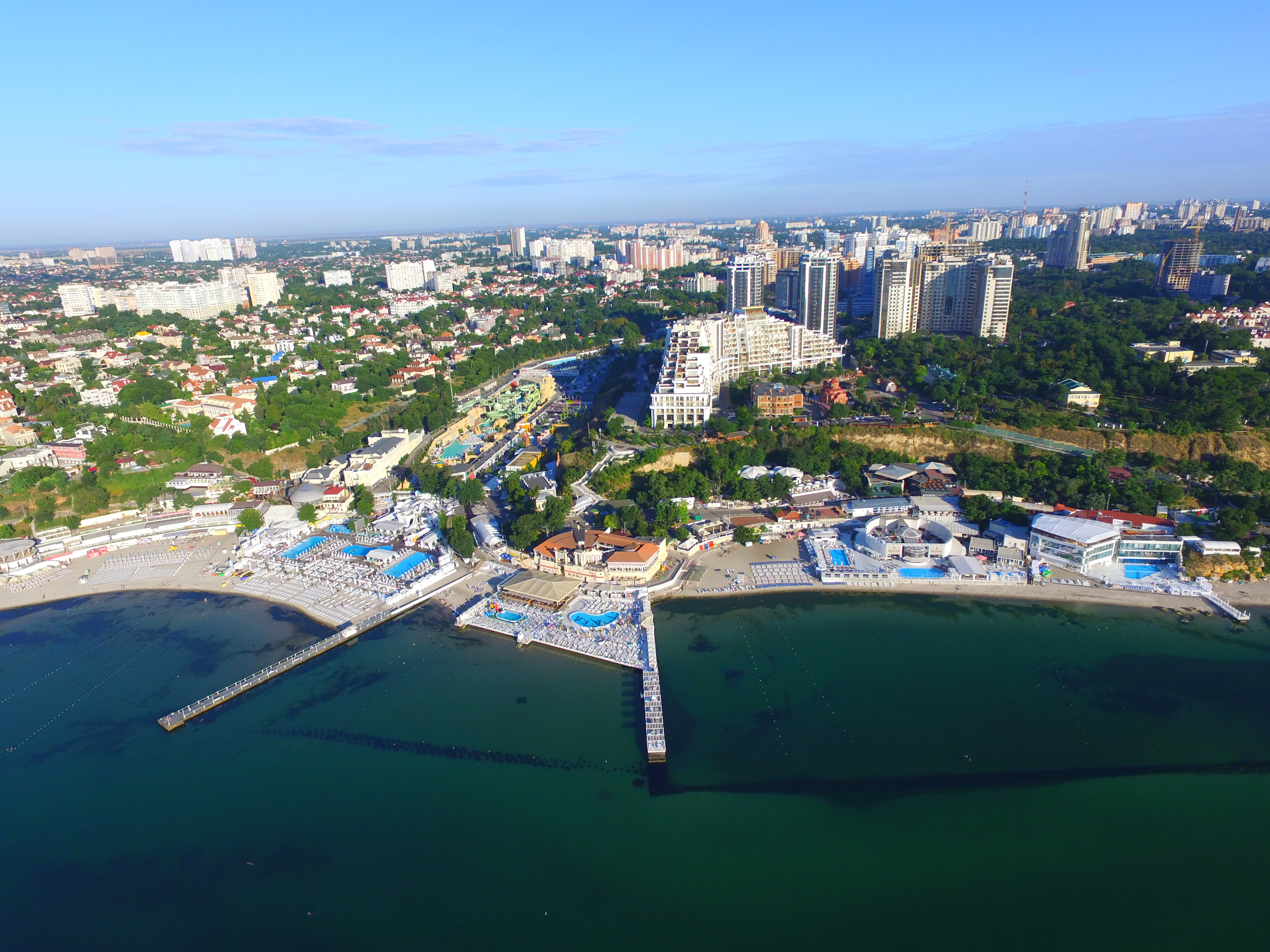
Odesa, capital and most populous city in Odesa Oblast

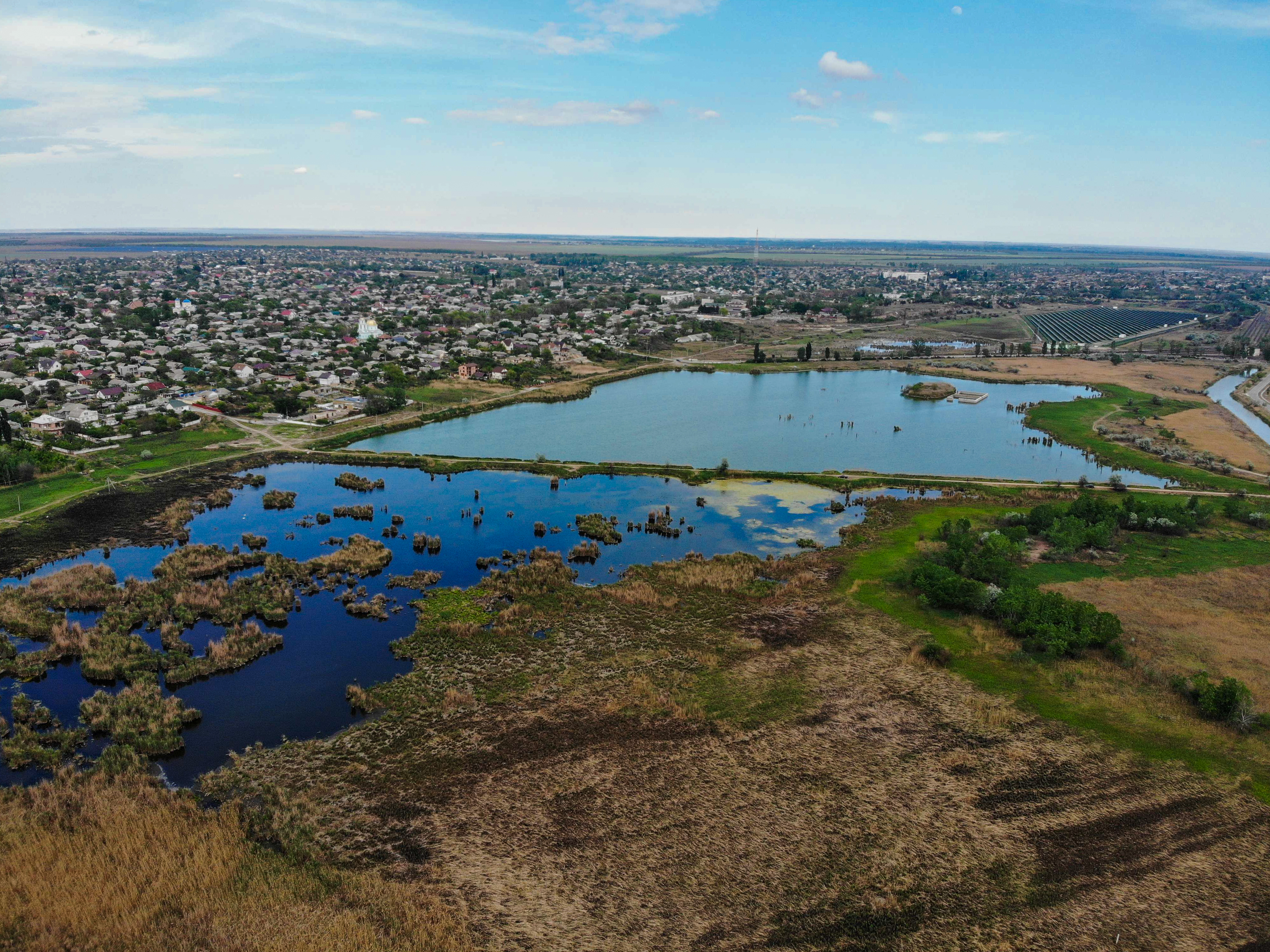
Izmail, the oblast's second most populous city and a major Ukrainian city on the Danube

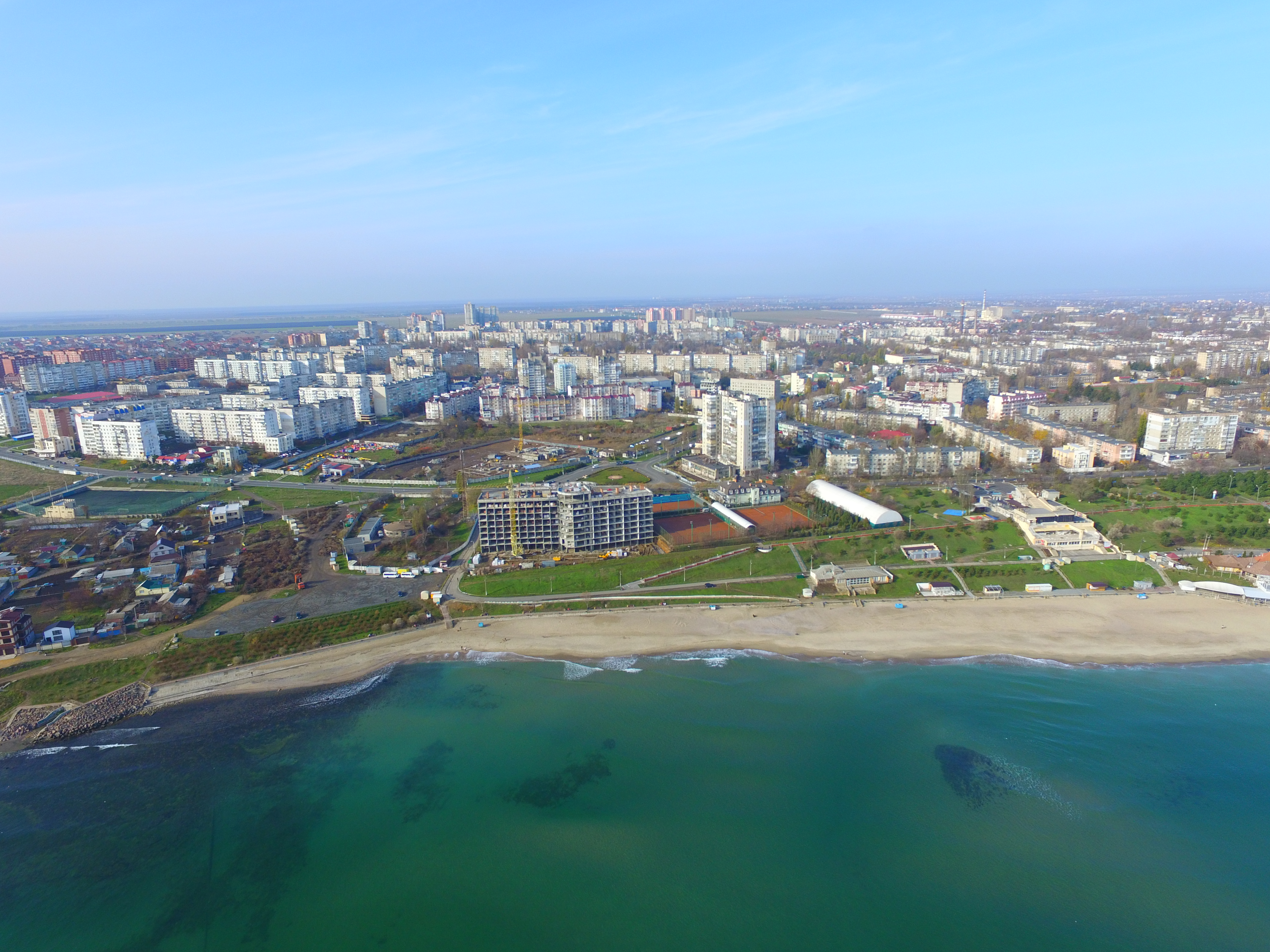
Chornomorsk, a key Black Sea port city and third most populous city in the oblast

Cities in Odesa Oblast
Name	Name (in Ukrainian) (Note: Links to the Ukrainian Wikipedia articles for each city)	Raion (district)	Population (2022 estimates)	Population (2001 census)	Population change
Ananiv	Ананьїв	Podilsk	7,626	9,476	−19.52%
Artsyz	Арциз	Bolhrad	14,355	16,370	−12.31%
Balta	Балта	Podilsk	17,854	19,962	−10.56%
Berezivka	Березівка	Berezivka	9,428	9,481	−0.56%
Biliaivka	Біляївка	Odesa	12,355	14,294	−13.57%
Bilhorod-Dnistrovskyi	Білгород-Дністровський	Bilhorod-Dnistrovskyi	47,727	51,890	−8.02%
Bolhrad	Болград	Bolhrad	14,818	17,353	−14.61%
Chornomorsk	Чорноморськ	Odesa	57,983	54,151	+7.08%
Izmail	Ізмаїл	Izmail	69,932	84,815	−17.55%
Kiliia	Кілія	Izmail	18,745	22,594	−17.04%
Kodyma	Кодима	Podilsk	8,404	9,634	−12.77%
Odesa	Одеса	Odesa	1,010,537	1,029,049	−1.80%
Pivdenne	Південне	Odesa	32,677	23,977	+36.28%
Podilsk	Подільськ	Podilsk	39,220	40,718	−3.68%
Reni	Рені	Izmail	17,736	20,481	−13.40%
Rozdilna	Роздільна	Rozdilna	17,441	17,754	−1.76%
Tatarbunary	Татарбунари	Bilhorod-Dnistrovskyi	10,836	10,797	+0.36%
Teplodar	Теплодар	Odesa	9,958	8,830	+12.77%
Vylkove	Вилкове	Izmail	7,712	9,260	−16.72%

== See also ==
- List of cities in Ukraine
