= Novomykhailivka, Podilsk Raion, Odesa Oblast =

Novomykhailivka Новомихайлівка
- Location in Odesa Oblast#Location in Ukraine Novomykhailivka (Ukraine)
- Coordinates: 47°27′58″N 29°31′57″E
- Country: Ukraine
- Oblast: Odesa Oblast
- Raion: Podilsk Raion
- Hromada: Okny settlement hromada

Population (2001)
  - Total: 208
- Time zone: UTC+2 (EET)
  - Summer (DST): UTC+3 (EEST)

Novomykhailivka (Ukrainian: Новомихайлівка; Romanian: Mihailovca Nouă) is a village located in Podilsk Raion of Odesa Oblast, Ukraine. It belongs to Okny settlement hromada, one of the hromadas of Ukraine.

Until 18 July 2020, Novoselivka belonged to Okny Raion. The raion was abolished in July 2020 as part of the administrative reform of Ukraine, which reduced the number of raions of Odesa Oblast to seven. The area of Okny Raion was merged into Podilsk Raion.

== Demographics ==
According to the 1989 census, the population of the village was 258 people, of whom 107 were men and 151 were women. According to the 2001 census of Ukraine, 208 people lived in the village.

=== Languages ===
Native language as of the Ukrainian Census of 2001:

Language	Percentage
Ukrainian	84.62 %
Moldovan (Romanian)	11.54 %
Russian	3.85 %
