= Platonove =

Rural locality in Odesa Oblast, Ukraine

Platonove Платонове
- Location within Odesa Oblast Location within Ukraine
- Coordinates: 47°25′25″N 29°22′04″E
- Country: Ukraine
- Oblast: Odesa Oblast
- Raion: Podilsk Raion
- Hromada: Okny settlement hromada
- Established: 1840

Area
  - Total: 0.028 km^{2} (0.011 sq mi)

Population (2001)
  - Total: 37

Platonove (Ukrainian: Платонове) is a village located in the Podilsk Raion of Odesa Oblast, Ukraine. It belongs to Okny settlement hromada, one of the hromadas of Ukraine. Platonove has 37 inhabitants (2001) and the village has an area of 0.028 km².

Platonove is located in the southwestern part of Ukraine, close to the Moldovan border, and has an international border crossing near the village. The Highway M13, which is part of the European route E584, runs through the village.

== History ==
Platonove was founded in 1840.

Until 18 July 2020 Platonove was located in Okny Raion. The raion was abolished that day as part of the administrative reform of Ukraine, which reduced the number of raions of Odesa Oblast to seven. The area of Okny Raion was merged into Podilsk Raion.
