= Olenivka, Podilsk Raion, Odesa Oblast =

Rural locality in Odesa Oblast, Ukraine

Olenivka Оленівка
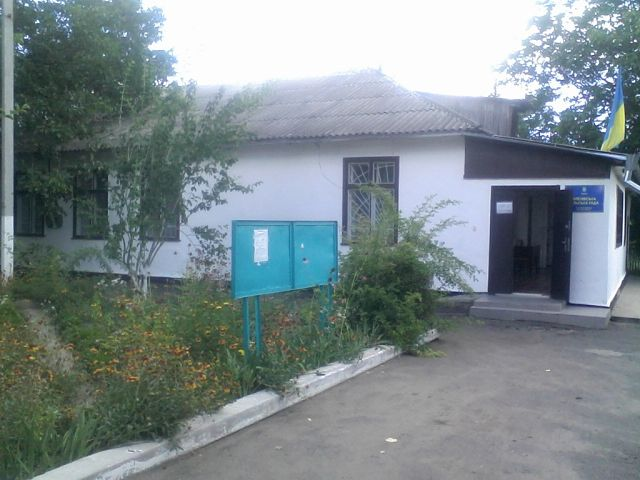

- Location in Ukraine Olenivka (Ukraine)
- Coordinates: 47°57′13″N 29°30′6″E
- Country: Ukraine
- Oblast: Odesa Oblast
- Raion: Podilsk Raion
- Hromada: Balta urban hromada
- Time zone: UTC+2 (EET)
  - Summer (DST): UTC+3 (EEST)

Olenivka (Ukrainian: Оленівка; Romanian: Urâta) is a village in Podilsk Raion, Odesa Oblast, southern Ukraine, located at 47° 57' 16"n, 29° 30' 45"e, near the Dniester River border with Moldova. Olenivka belongs to Balta urban hromada, one of the hromadas of Ukraine. It is approximately 110 kilometres (68 mi) from Chișinău.

Until 18 July 2020, Shkarbynka belonged to Balta Municipality. The municipality as an administrative unit was abolished in July 2020 as part of the administrative reform of Ukraine, which reduced the number of raions of Odesa Oblast to seven. The area of Balta Municipality was merged into Podilsk Raion.
