= Bilyne =

Rural locality in Odesa Oblast, Ukraine

Bilyne Білине
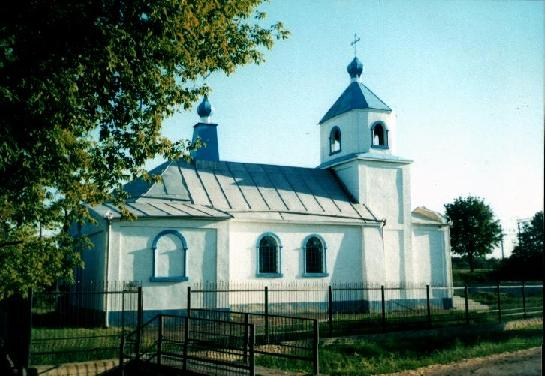
- Interactive map of Bilyne
- Location in Ukraine Bilyne (Ukraine)
- Country: Ukraine
- Oblast: Odesa Oblast
- Raion: Podilsk Raion
- Hromada: Balta urban hromada

Area
  - Total: 1.69 km^{2} (0.65 sq mi)

Population
  - Total: 2,074
  - Density: 1,230/km^{2} (3,180/sq mi)
- Time zone: UTC+2 (EET)
  - Summer (DST): UTC+3 (EEST)
- Postal code: 66161

Bilyne (Ukrainian: Білине) is a village in Podilsk Raion, Odesa Oblast, southern Ukraine located near the Dniester river border with Moldova. It belongs to Balta urban hromada, one of the hromadas of Ukraine. Bilyne is located at 47° 52' 31"n, 29° 37' 22"e.

Until 18 July 2020, Bilyne belonged to City of Balta. The municipality as an administrative unit was abolished in July 2020 as part of the administrative reform of Ukraine, which reduced the number of raions of Odesa Oblast to seven. The area of Balta Municipality was merged into Podilsk Raion.
