= Rozivka, Podilsk Raion, Odesa Oblast =

Settlement in Odesa Oblast, Ukraine

Rozivka Розівка
- Location in Ukraine Rozivka (Ukraine)
- Coordinates: 47°27′16″N 29°19′54″E
- Country: Ukraine
- Oblast: Odesa Oblast
- Raion: Podilsk Raion
- Hromada: Okny settlement hromada

Population (2001)
  - Total: 30
- Postal code: 67934

Rozivka (Ukrainian: Розівка) is a village in the Okny settlement hromada, in Podilsk Raion, Odesa Oblast, Ukraine.

The village had 30 inhabitants in 2001. In the 2001 Ukrainian census, 16 (53.34%) people declared "Moldovan" (Romanian) as their mother language, 13 (43.33%) declared Ukrainian and 1 (3.33%) Russian.
