= Moshniahy =

Rural locality in Odesa Oblast, Ukraine

Moshniahy Мошняги
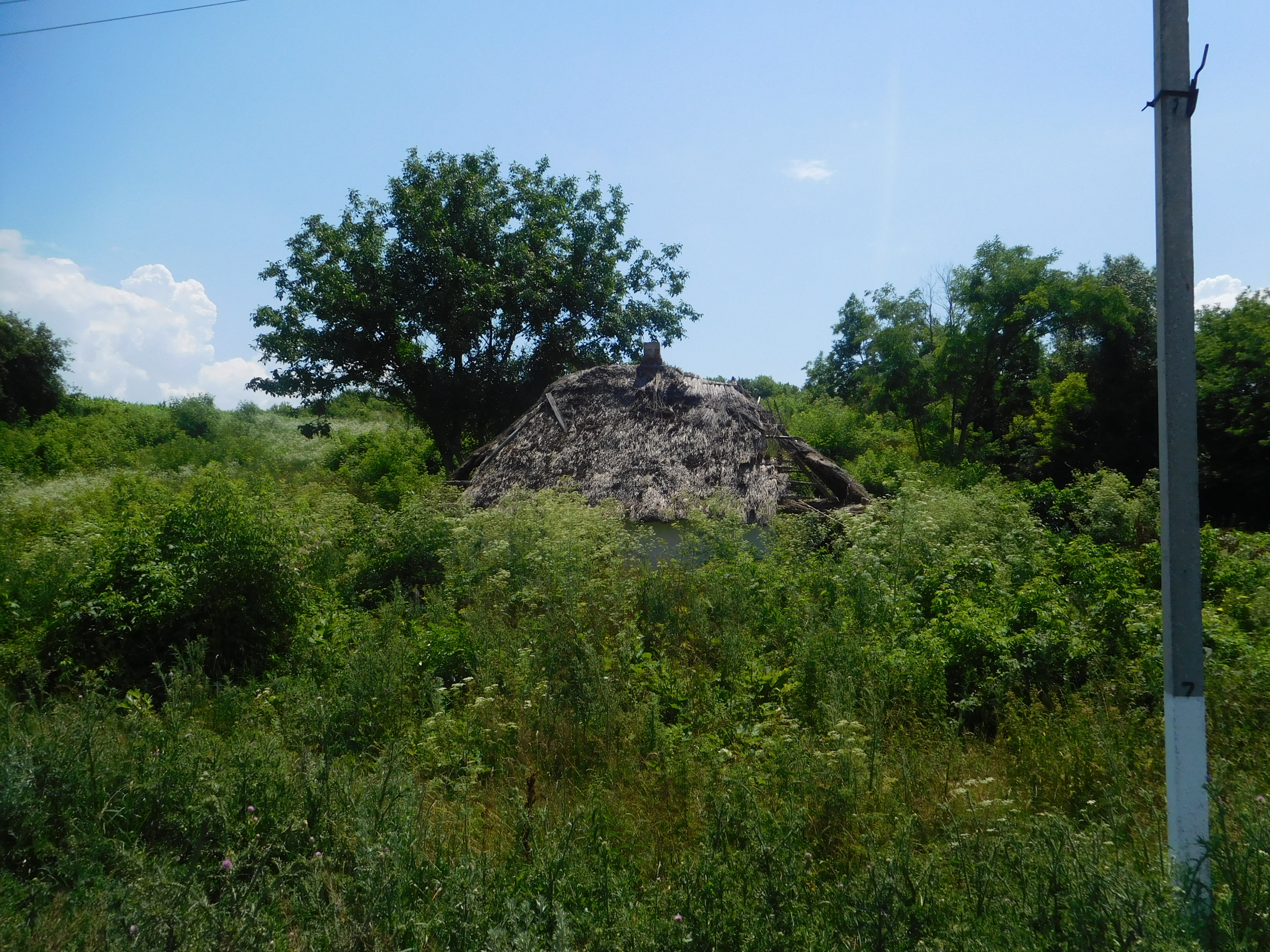

- Location in Ukraine Moshniahy (Ukraine)
- Country: Ukraine
- Oblast: Odesa Oblast
- Raion: Podilsk Raion
- Hromada: Balta urban hromada
- Time zone: UTC+2 (EET)
  - Summer (DST): UTC+3 (EEST)

Moshniahy is a village in Podilsk Raion, Odesa Oblast of southern Ukraine located near the Dniester river border with Moldova. It belongs to Balta urban hromada, one of the hromadas of Ukraine. Moshniahy is located at 47° 56' 53" north, 29° 30' 26" east.

== History ==
Moszniagi, as it was called in Polish, was a private village of the Koniecpolski and Lubomirski Polish noble families, administratively located in the Bracław County in the Bracław Voivodeship in the Lesser Poland Province of the Kingdom of Poland.

Until 18 July 2020, Moshniahy belonged to Balta Municipality. The municipality as an administrative unit was abolished in July 2020 as part of the administrative reform of Ukraine, which reduced the number of raions of Odesa Oblast to seven. The area of Balta Municipality was merged into Podilsk Raion.
