= Countess Glebova manor =

Castle in Ukraine

- Садиба Графині Глебової
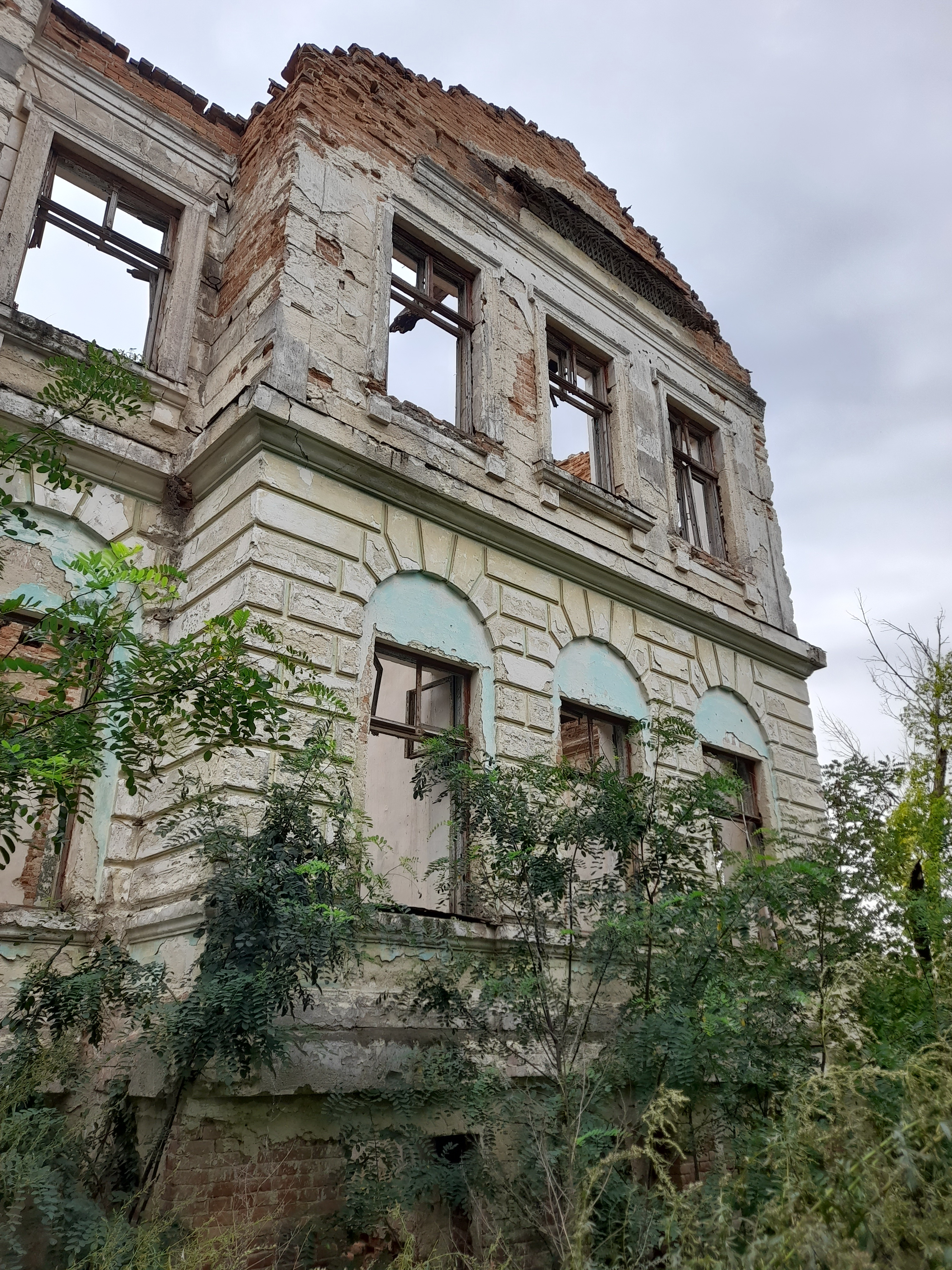
- Modern view of the manor
- Interactive map of the Countess Glebova manor area

General information
- Status: ruins
- Location: Dubky, Odesa Oblast, Ukraine
- Coordinates: 47.971099°N 30.069729°E
- Client: Countess Glebova

The Countess Glebova manor is an architectural monument located in the village of Dubky, Podilsk Raion, Odesa Oblast, Ukraine.

The estate was built by order of Countess Glebova at the end of the 19th century in the Dubkiv forest near the village. Instead, the countess herself never lived in this estate. Now the remains of the estate are located on the territory of the sanatorium of the boarding school.

== Gallery ==
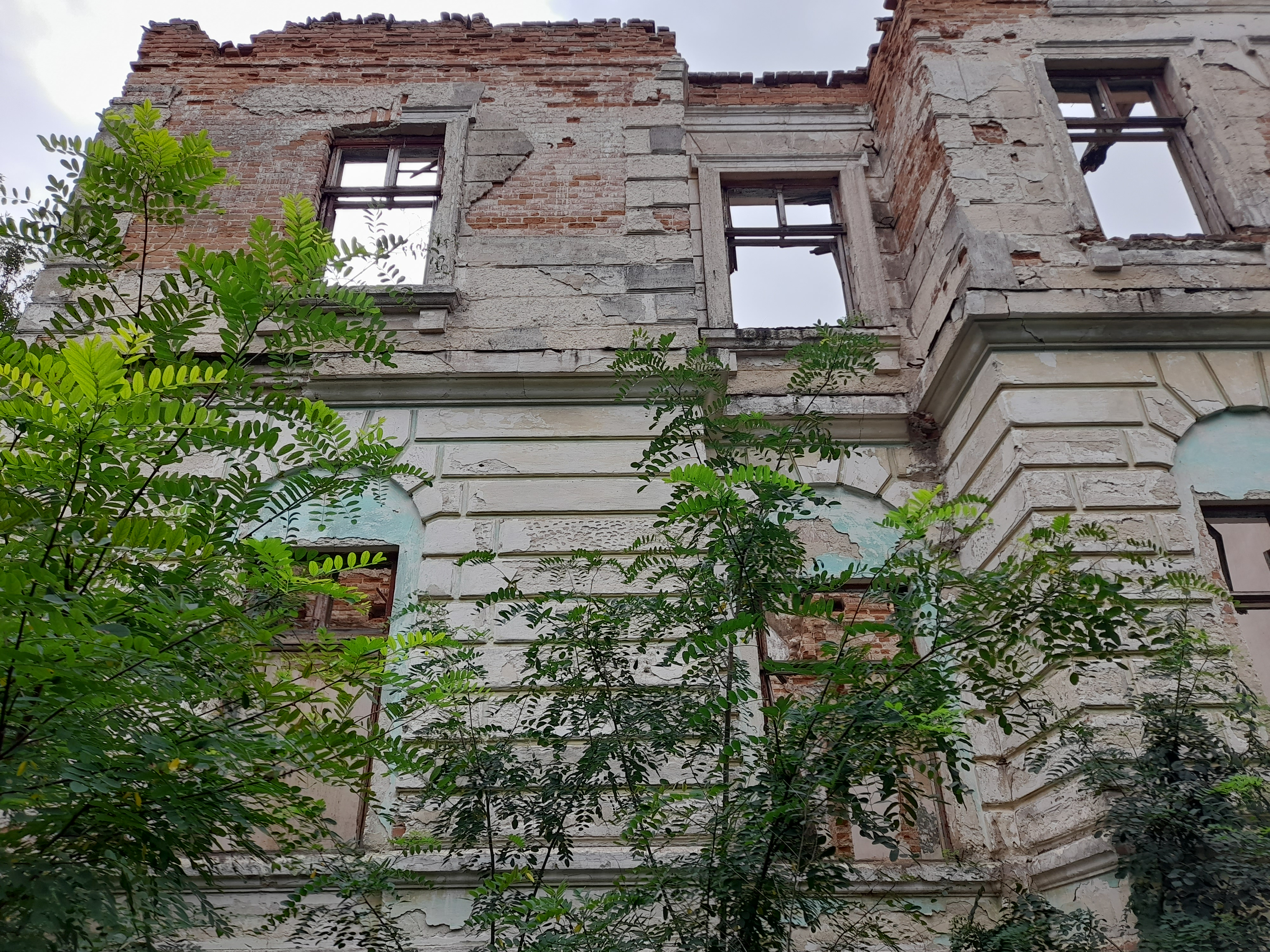

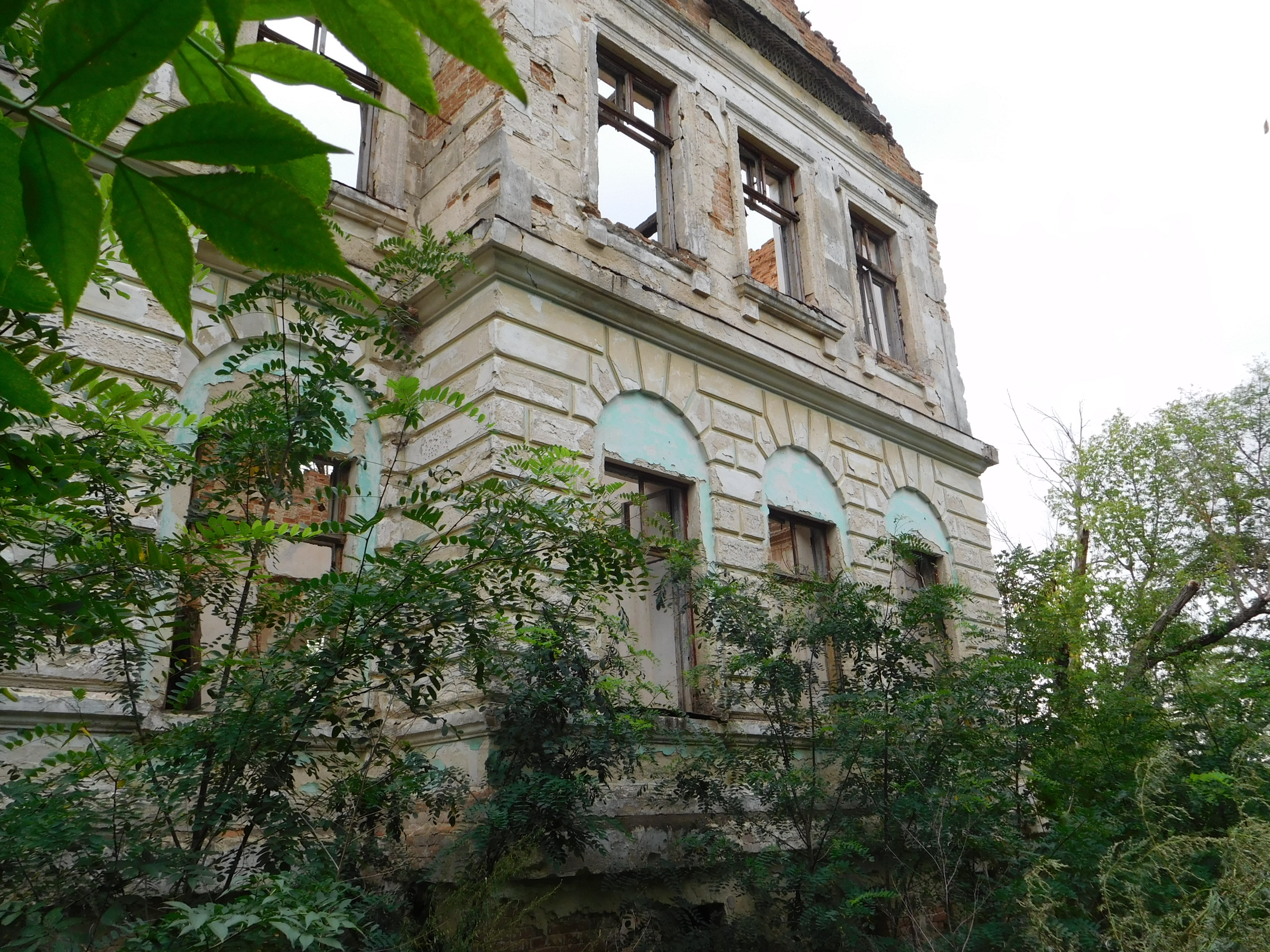

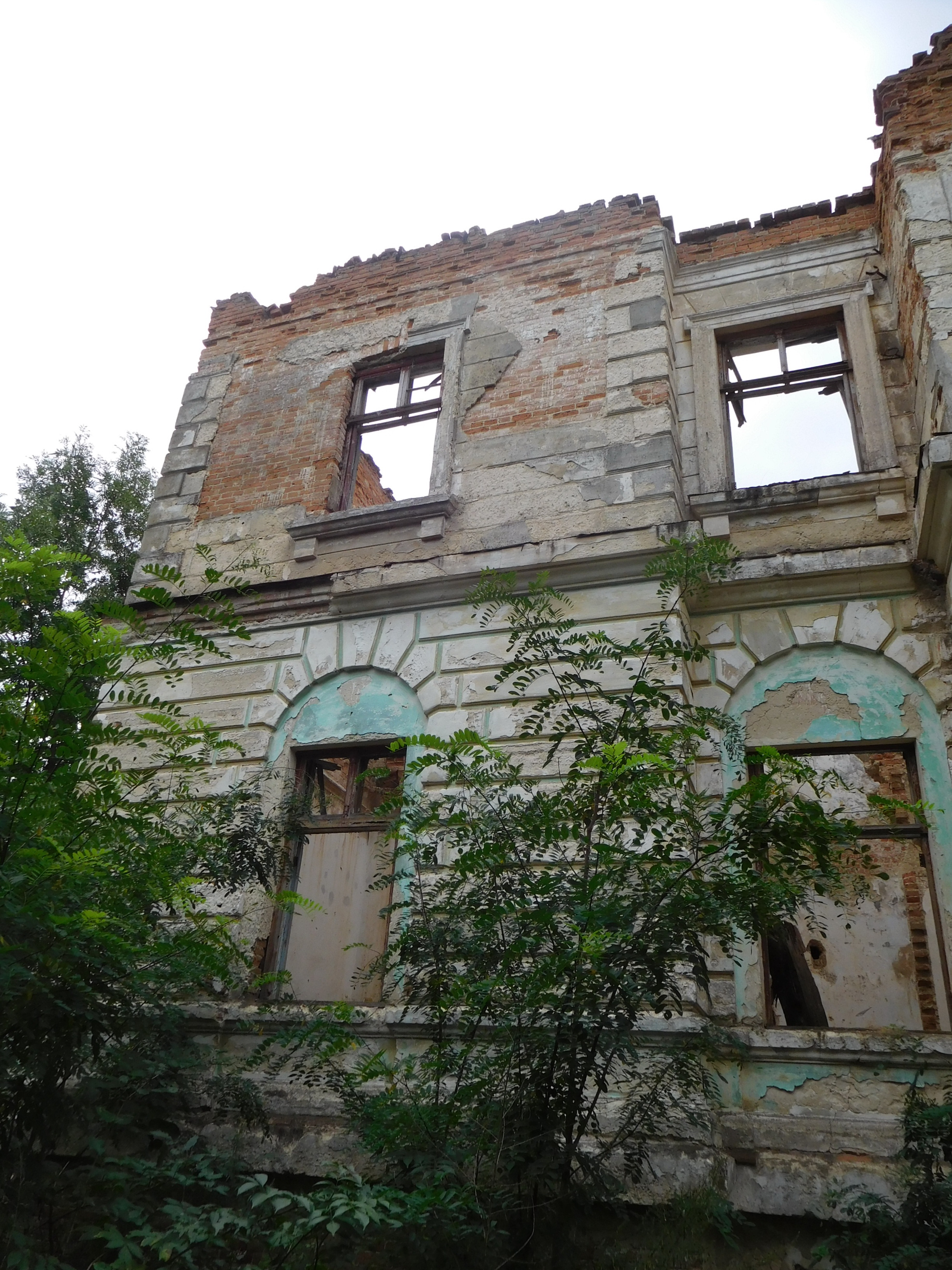

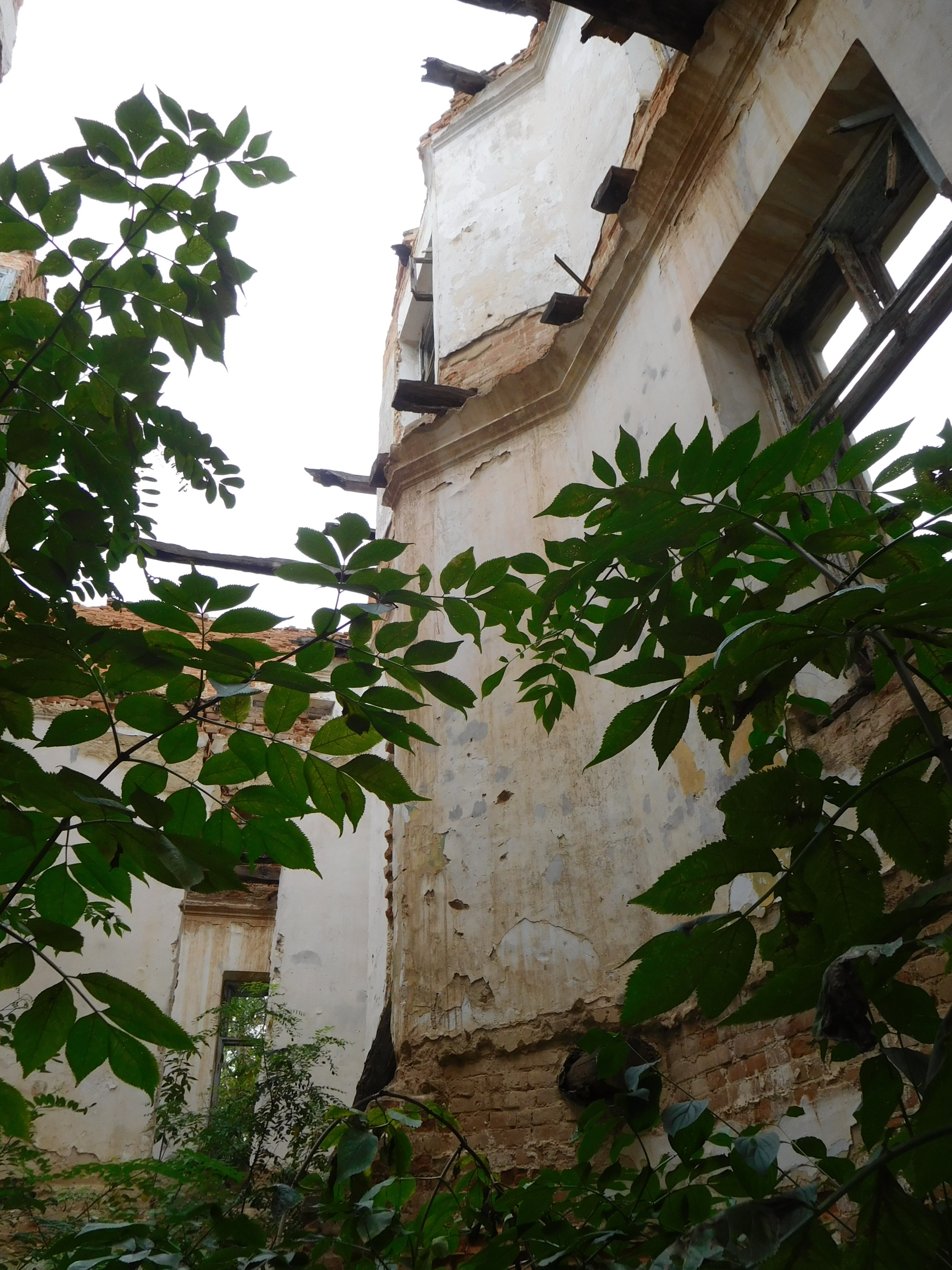

== Sources ==
- Руины графского поместья. с. Дубки. Одесская обл.
- https://www.youtube.com/watch?v=7RhCtKshSvk&ab_channel=%D0%97%D0%BE%D0%BE%D1%82%D1%80%D0%BE%D0%BF%28Zootrop%29
