= Zelenyi Hai, Odesa Oblast =

Zelenyi Hai Зелений Гай
- Village
- Location in Ukraine Zelenyi Hai (Ukraine)
- Country: Ukraine
- Oblast: Odesa Oblast
- Raion: Podilsk Raion
- Hromada: Balta urban hromada
- Time zone: UTC+2 (EET)
  - Summer (DST): UTC+3 (EEST)

Zelenyi Hai (Ukrainian: Зелений Гай) is a village in Podilsk Raion, Odesa Oblast, Ukraine. It forms part of Balta urban hromada, one of the hromadas of Ukraine.

== Demographics ==
According to the 1989 census, the population of Zelenyi Hai was 24 people, of whom 10 were men and 14 were women.

According to the 2001 census, 2 people lived in the village. 100% of the population indicated Ukrainian as their native language.
