= Stara Kulna =

Settlement in Odesa Oblast, Ukraine

Stara Kulna Стара Кульна (Ukrainian) Culmea Veche, Culnaia Veche (Romanian)
- Location in Ukraine Stara Kulna (Ukraine)
- Coordinates: 47°41′46″N 29°18′54″E
- Country: Ukraine
- Oblast: Odesa Oblast
- Raion: Podilsk Raion
- Hromada: Kuialnyk rural hromada

Population (2001)
  - Total: 1,067
- Postal code: 66334

Stara Kulna (Ukrainian: Стара Кульна; Romanian: Culmea Veche or Culnaia Veche) is a village in the Kuialnyk rural hromada, in Podilsk Raion, Odesa Oblast, Ukraine.

== History ==
On 2 August 1940, the Moldavian Soviet Socialist Republic was established, roughly incorporating the territory of six districts of the Moldavian Autonomous Soviet Socialist Republic (MASSR), as well as some villages from other districts. The remainder, approximately composed by the other eight districts in which the MASSR had been divided plus some villages from the other ones, stayed within the Ukrainian Soviet Socialist Republic, which the MASSR had so far been part of, with its autonomy being abolished.

Still, there remained some villages with ethnic Moldavian majorities in the Ukrainian SSR, and some border adjustments took place between both Soviet republics following the Moldavian SSR's formation. According to Romanian researcher Călin Pântea, the Moldavian-majority villages of Nove Dorotske (Doroțcaia Nouă), Sadove (Sadovo) and Stara Kulna were approved for transfer into the Moldavian SSR on 10 May 1941. However, Romanian schoolteacher Viorel Dolha stated that only the citizens' transfer requests from Nove Dorotske and Sadove were accepted, with Stara Kulna's being rejected alongside those from Hrebenyky (Grebenichi), Slovyano-Serbka (Slaveano-Serbca), Stanislavka (Stanislavca) and Tymkove (Timcov).

As asserted by Pântea, the outbreak of the German and Romanian invasion of the Soviet Union during World War II on 22 June that year obstructed the implementation of the transfer approved on 10 May, and it remained unrealized even after the war.

== Demographics ==
The village had 1,067 inhabitants in 2001. In the 2001 Ukrainian census, 865 (81.07%) people declared "Moldovan" (Romanian) as their mother language, 143 (13.40%) declared Ukrainian, 55 (5.15%) Russian and 4 (0.37%) other languages.

The Taraf (Тараф) ensemble of Moldovan music in Stara Kulna is one of several groups in Podilsk Raion popularizing Moldovan traditions and performing Moldovan folk songs, mostly of domestic or patriotic character. These groups make use of instruments such as the violin, trumpet, bayan, nai, fluier, cimpoi and cimbalom.

== Notable people ==
- Lev Barschi (1909–1974), Jewish Moldovan writer
- Nistor Cabac (1913–1941), Moldovan poet and translator
- Ion D. Ciobanu (1910–2000), Moldovan politician and philologist
- Ion Ciornîi (1928–2003), Moldovan philologist, journalist, linguist and university professor
