= Yosypivka, Podilsk Raion, Odesa Oblast =

Rural locality in Odesa Oblast, Ukraine

Yosypivka Йосипівка
- Location in Ukraine Yosypivka (Odesa Oblast)
- Coordinates: 48°2′32″N 29°54′59″E
- Country: Ukraine
- Oblast: Odesa Oblast
- Raion: Podilsk Raion
- Hromada: Savran settlement hromada
- Village founded: 1759

Area
  - Total: 3.03 km^{2} (1.17 sq mi)

Population (2001)
  - Total: 629
- Time zone: UTC+2 (EET)
  - Summer (DST): UTC+3 (EEST)
- Postal code: 66231
- Area code: +380 4865
- Former name: Yuzefivka (1759–1945)

Yosypivka (Ukrainian: Йосипівка; until February 1, 1945, Ukrainian: Юзефівка) is a village in Podilsk Raion, Odesa Oblast, Ukraine. It belongs to Savran settlement hromada, one of the hromadas of Ukraine.

== History ==
During the Holodomor organized by the Soviet authorities in 1932—1933 at least 103 villagers died.

According to the 1989 census of the Ukrainian SSR, the village's population was 758 people, of whom 319 were men and 439 were women. According to the 2001 Ukrainian census, the village had a population of 629 people.

The former local government body was the Bakshan Village Council.

== See also ==
- List of settlements affected by the Holodomor of 1932—1933 (Odesa Oblast)
