= Savran settlement hromada =

Coordinates: 48°07′N 30°04′E

Savran settlement hromada Савранська селищна громада
- Hromada
- Interactive map of Savran settlement hromada
- Country: Ukraine
- Oblast: Odesa Oblast
- Raion: Podilsk Raion
- Admin. center: Savran

Area
  - Total: 626.4 km^{2} (241.9 sq mi)

Population (2020)
  - Total: 18,167
  - Density: 29.00/km^{2} (75.12/sq mi)
- CATOTTG code: UA51120210000054996
- Settlements: 21
- Rural settlements: 2
- Villages: 19
- Website: https://savranrada.odessa.ua/

Savran settlement hromada (Ukrainian: Савранська селищна громада) is a hromada in Podilsk Raion of Odesa Oblast in southwestern Ukraine. Population: 18,167 (2020 est.)

The hromada consists of two rural settlement (Kovbasova Poliana and Savran) and 19 villages:

- Baibuzivka
- Baksha
- Bilousivka
- Vilshanka
- Hetmanivka
- Hlybochok
- Dubynove
- Dubky
- Yosypivka
- Kamyane
- Kapustianka
- Kvitka
- Kontseba
- Nedilkove
- Osychky
- Ostrivka
- Polianetske
- Sliusareve
- Strutynka

== Links ==
- https://decentralization.gov.ua/newgromada/4372#
- Паспорт Савранської громади (2016) на сайті Одеського Центру розвитку місцевого самоврядування
- Мапа рідної мови в громадах України
