= Moshe Zvi of Savran =

First Rebbe of Savran Hasidic dynasty (1775–1837)

Moshe Zvi Giterman of Savran (1775 – 1837) was the first Rebbe of the Savran Hasidic dynasty and an influential Hasidic leader in western Ukraine, whose following numbered in the thousands.

He was a strict interpreter of the Torah and Talmud. He was also known from many stories with a morale.

His father, Rabbi Shimon Shlomo (I), was the Maggid of Savran and a disciple of Dovber of Mezeritch, the primary disciple of the Baal Shem Tov, founder of Hasidic Judaism. Moshe Zvi was a disciple of his father, and also of Rabbi Levi Yitschok of Berditchev and Rabbi Boruch of Mezhbizh. After his father's death in 1802, Moshe Zvi took over his position as the Maggid of Savran. Moshe Zvi went on to become the Rabbi of Berditchev after the death of Rabbi Levi Yitzchok of Berditchev, and later became the Rabbi of the towns of Uman and Kishinev as well. He had thousands of chasidim in Volhynia and Bessarabia.
