= Slobidka settlement hromada =

Coordinates: 47°53′N 29°20′E

Slobidka settlement hromada Слобідська селищна громада
- Hromada
- Interactive map of Slobidka settlement hromada
- Country: Ukraine
- Oblast: Odesa Oblast
- Raion: Podilsk Raion
- Admin. center: Slobidka

Area
  - Total: 115.2 km^{2} (44.5 sq mi)

Population (2020)
  - Total: 3,505
  - Density: 30.43/km^{2} (78.80/sq mi)
- CATOTTG code: UA51120230000084853
- Settlements: 5
- Rural settlements: 1
- Villages: 4
- Website: https://slobidska-gromada.gov.ua/

Slobidka settlement hromada (Ukrainian: Слобідська селищна громада) is a hromada in Podilsk Raion of Odesa Oblast in southwestern Ukraine. It has a population of 3,505 (2020 est.)

The hromada consists of one rural settlement of Slobidka and 4 villages: Kyrylivka, Mala Slobidka, Pravda and Tymkove.

== Links ==
- https://decentralization.gov.ua/newgromada/4376
- http://slobidska-gromada.gov.ua
