= Kuialnyk rural hromada =

Coordinates: 47°43′40″N 29°33′31″E

Kuialnyk rural hromada Куяльницька сільська громада
- Hromada
- Interactive map of Kuialnyk rural hromada
- Country: Ukraine
- Oblast: Odesa Oblast
- Raion: Podilsk Raion
- Admin. center: Kuialnyk

Area
  - Total: 626.4 km^{2} (241.9 sq mi)

Population (2020)
  - Total: 18,167
  - Density: 29.00/km^{2} (75.12/sq mi)
- CATOTTG code: UA51120110000047677
- Settlements: 58
- Rural settlements: 2
- Villages: 56
- Website: https://kuyalnyksr.od.gov.ua/

Kuialnyk rural hromada (Ukrainian: Куяльницька сільська громада) is a hromada in Podilsk Raion of Odesa Oblast in southwestern Ukraine. Population: 18,167 (2020 est.)

The hromada consists of two rural settlement (Borshi and Chubivka) and 56 villages:

- Andriivka
- Borshi
- Bochmanivka
- Hertopy
- Hyderym
- Hlybochok
- Honorata
- Horyivka
- Hrekova Druhe
- Hrekova Pershe
- Dibrivka
- Domnytsia
- Fedorivka
- Kachurivka
- Kyrylivka
- Klymentove
- Kosy
- Kosy-Slobidka
- Kuialnyk (seat of administration)
- Liubomyrka
- Mala Kindrativka
- Mala Oleksandrivka
- Mala Petrivka
- Malyi Fontan
- Malyi Kuialnyk
- Mardarivka
- Mykolaivka
- Mykolaivka Persha
- Murovana
- Nestoita
- Nova Kulna
- Novyi Myr
- Novoselivka
- Obrochne
- Oleksiivka
- Padretseve
- Pereshory
- Petrivka
- Poplavka
- Romanivka
- Rozalivka
- Sobolivka
- Stanislavka
- Stara Kulna
- Stavky
- Stepanivka
- Topyk
- Velyka Kindrativka
- Velyke Burylove
- Velykyi Fontan
- Vesternychany
- Vyshneve
- Yasynove
- Yefrosynivka
- Zatyshshia
- Zelenyi Kut

== Links ==
- Куяльницька сільська ОТГ // Облікова картка на офіційному вебсайті Верховної Ради України.
- gromada.info: Куяльницька об’єднана територіальна громада
- Децентралізація влади: Куяльницька сільська громада
