= Balta urban hromada =

Coordinates: 47°57′30″N 29°37′00″E

Balta urban hromada Балтська міська громада
- Hromada
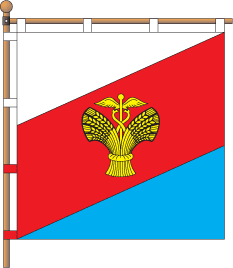
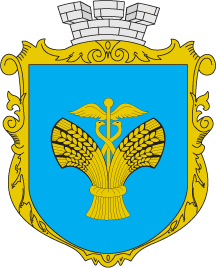
- Flag Coat of arms
- Interactive map of Balta urban hromada
- Country: Ukraine
- Oblast: Odesa Oblast
- Raion: Podilsk Raion
- Admin. center: Balta

Area
  - Total: 1,041.8 km^{2} (402.2 sq mi)

Population (2022)
  - Total: 33,740
  - Density: 32.39/km^{2} (83.88/sq mi)
- CATOTTG code: UA51120030000075494
- Settlements: 34
- Cities: 1
- Villages: 33

Balta urban hromada (Ukrainian: Балтська міська громада), or simply Balta hromada is an urban-type hromada in the Podilsk Raion of Odesa Oblast, Ukraine. It has an area of 1041.8 km^{2}, and a population of 33,740, out of which, 17,854 or 52.91% lives in the main city, Balta.

== Settlements ==
The hromada is made up of 33 villages and Balta, the administrative center. The list of villages:

| Name | Population | Area (km^{2)} | Population density |
|---|---|---|---|
| Akulinivka | | | |
| Andriyashivka | | | |
| Balta | 17,854 | 18.04 | 989.7 |
| Bendzary | 1,316 | 2.19 | 474.9 |
| Berezivka | | | |
| Bilyne | 2,074 | 1.69 | 1227.2 |
| Borsuki | | | |
| Cherneche | | | |
| Evtodia | | | |
| Holma | | | |
| Karmalyukivka | | | |
| Kharytynivka | | | |
| Kozatske | | | |
| Korytne | | | |
| Kryzhovlyn | | | |
| Lisnychivka | | | |
| Mirony | | | |
| Moshniahy | 251 | 1.64 | 153 |
| Nemyrivske | | | |
| Novopol | | | |
| Obzhile | | | |
| Olenivka | 679 | 2.66 | 255.26 |
| Pasat | | | |
| Pasitseli | | | |
| Pereyma | | | |
| Perelyoty | | | |
| Petrivka | | | |
| Ploske | | | |
| Sarazhinka | | | |
| Semeno-Karpivka | | | |
| Sinne | | | |
| Vidrada | | | |
| Volova | | | |
| Zelenyi Hai | 2 | 0.3 | 6.7 |
