= Savran (Hasidic dynasty) =

Ukrainian Hasidic dynasty

Savran is a Hasidic dynasty whose founding rebbe was Moshe Zvi Giterman. Savran is a town in Ukraine.
