= Savran Raion =

Former subdivision of Odesa Oblast, Ukraine

Coordinates: 48°08′N 30°05′E

Savran Raion Савранський район
- Raion
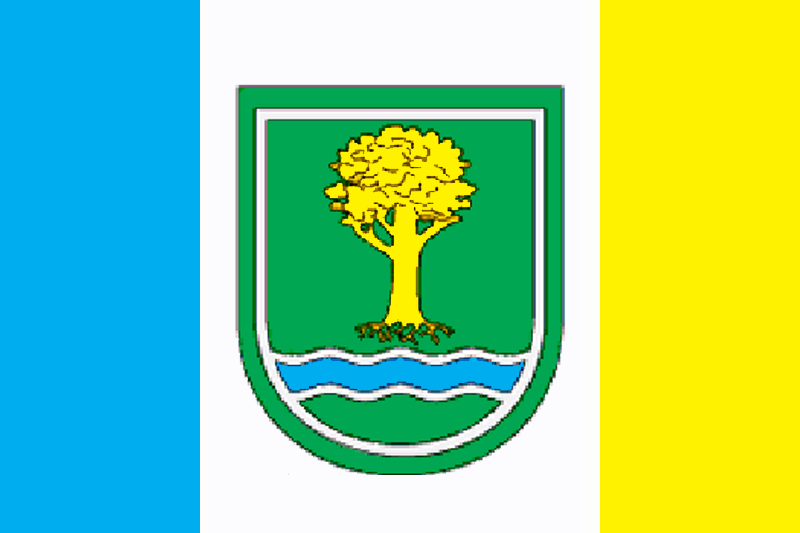
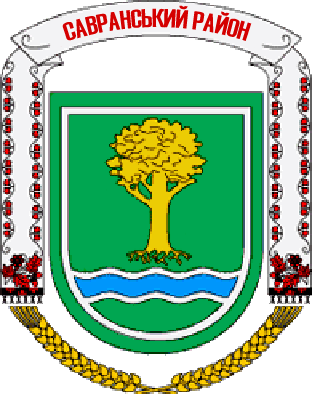
- Flag Coat of arms

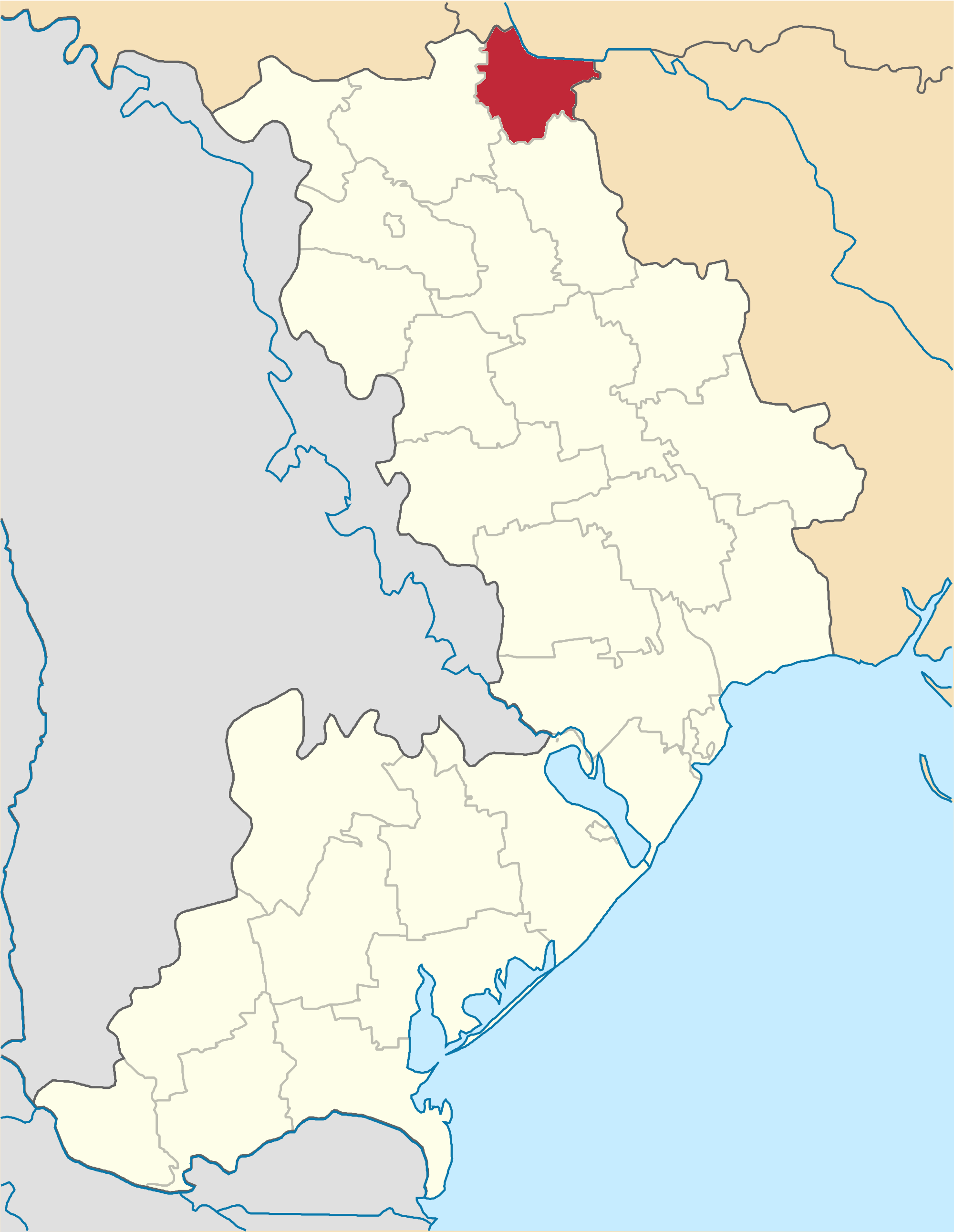
- Country: Ukraine
- Oblast: Odesa Oblast
- Established: 1923
- Disestablished: 18 July 2020
- Admin. center: Savran
- Subdivisions: List: 0 — city councils; 1 — settlement councils; 20 — rural councils; Number of localities: 0 — cities; 1 — urban-type settlements; 19 — villages; 1 — rural settlements

Government
  - Governor: Oleg Ispanyuk

Area
  - Total: 618 km^{2} (239 sq mi)

Population (2020)
  - Total: 18,167 ▼
  - Density: 29.4/km^{2} (76.1/sq mi)
- Time zone: UTC+02:00 (EET)
  - Summer (DST): UTC+03:00 (EEST)
- Postal index: 66200–66240
- Area code: +380 4865
- Website: http://savran-rda.odessa.gov.ua/

Savran Raion (Ukrainian: Савранський район) was a raion (district) in Odesa Oblast of Ukraine. Its administrative center was the urban-type settlement of Savran. The raion was abolished on 18 July 2020 as part of the administrative reform of Ukraine, which reduced the number of raions of Odesa Oblast to seven. The area of Savran Raion was merged into Podilsk Raion. The last estimate of the raion population was 18,167 (2020 est.).

At the time of disestablishment, the raion consisted of one hromada, Savran settlement hromada with the administration in Savran.
