= Savran, Odesa Oblast =

Rural locality in Odesa Oblast, Ukraine

Savran Саврань
- Rural settlement
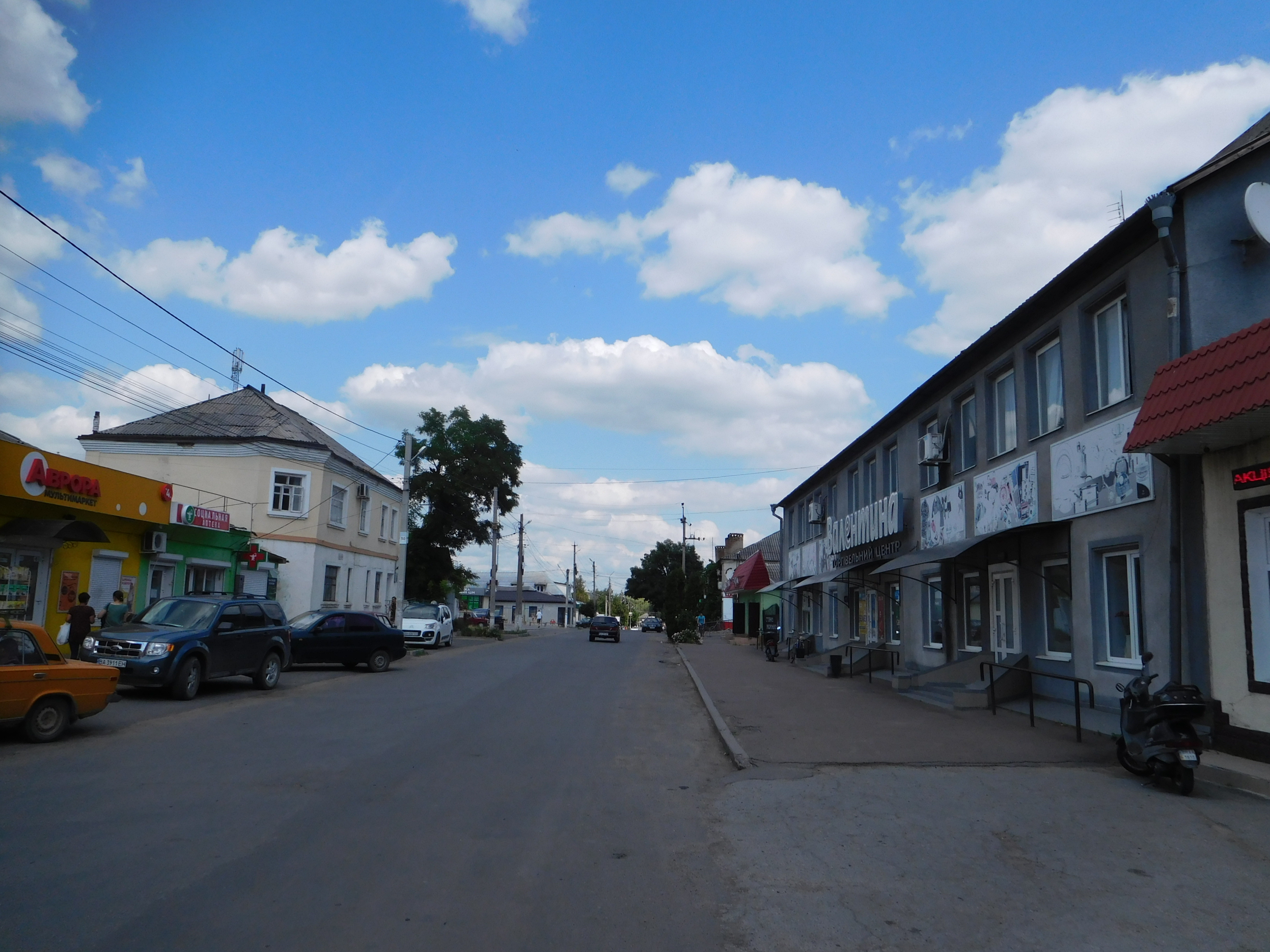
- Interactive map of Savran
- Location within Odesa Oblast Location within Ukraine
- Coordinates: 48°07′44″N 30°04′47″E
- Country: Ukraine
- Oblast: Odesa Oblast
- Raion: Podilsk Raion
- Hromada: Savran settlement hromada

Population (2022)
  - Total: 6,074
- Time zone: UTC+2 (EET)
  - Summer (DST): UTC+3 (EEST)

Savran (Ukrainian: Саврань) is a rural settlement in Podilsk Raion, Odesa Oblast, southern Ukraine. It hosts the administration of Savran settlement hromada, one of the hromadas of Ukraine. Savran is located 42 kilometres (26 mi) northeast of Balta. Population: 6,074 (2022 estimate).

37 (1775), 106 (1849), 324 (1849), 993 (1858), 3,016 (1873), 4,256 (1885), 4,371 (1889), 5,887 (1897), 7,939 (1905), 7,013 (1923), 8,243 (1926), 5,201 (1939), 8,730 (1959), 6,521 (1970), 6,872 (1979), 7,508 (1989), 6,874 (2001), 6,616 (2011), 6,125 (2021)

== History ==
Sawrań, as it was called in Polish, was a private town of the Koniecpolski and Lubomirski Polish noble families, administratively located in the Bracław County in the Bracław Voivodeship in the Lesser Poland Province of the Kingdom of Poland.

The town was annexed by Russia in the Second Partition of Poland in 1793. Afterwards, it passed to the Sołtyk and Rzewuski families, and famed Polish explorer, orientalist and horse expert Wacław Seweryn Rzewuski settled there in the later part of his life. Rzewuski placed a horse stud there and established a Baghdad-style garden. In 1837, the town became a government property, and the local Catholic church was suppressed in 1846.

Until World War II it had a sizeable Jewish community, which numbered 1,198 in 1900. It had been the center of the Hasidic Savran dynasty.

Until 17 July 2020, Savran was the administrative center of Savran Raion. The raion was abolished in July 2020 as part of the administrative reform of Ukraine, which reduced the number of raions of Odesa Oblast to seven. The area of Savran Raion was merged into Podilsk Raion.

Until 26 January 2024, Savran was designated urban-type settlement. On this day, a new law entered into force which abolished this status, and Savran became a rural settlement.

== Notable people ==
- Moshe Zvi Giterman (1775–1837), rabbi of Savran and a Hasidic rebbe
- Elisa Lispector (1911–1989), Brazilian novelist and older sister of Clarice Lispector.
