= Okny settlement hromada =

Coordinates: 47°32′N 29°27′E

Okny settlement hromada Окнянська селищна громада
- Hromada
- Interactive map of Okny settlement hromada
- Country: Ukraine
- Oblast: Odesa Oblast
- Raion: Podilsk Raion
- Admin. center: Okny

Area
  - Total: 1,020.2 km^{2} (393.9 sq mi)

Population (2020)
  - Total: 19,606
  - Density: 19.218/km^{2} (49.774/sq mi)
- CATOTTG code: UA51120150000080138
- Settlements: 55
- Rural settlements: 3
- Villages: 52
- Website: http://oknyanska.gromada.org.ua/

Okny settlement hromada (Ukrainian: Окнянська селищна громада) is a hromada in Podilsk Raion of Odesa Oblast in southwestern Ukraine. Population: 19,606 (2020 est.)

The hromada consists of three rural settlement (Novyi Orach, Okny and Orlivka) and 52 villages:

- Antonivka
- Artyrivka
- Budaivtsi
- Chorna
- Halochi
- Havynosy
- Horiachivka
- Hulianka
- Demianivka
- Dihory
- Dnistrovets (unpopulated since 2010s)
- Dovzhanka
- Dubove
- Fedorivka (Hulianka Starostat)
- Fedorivka (Stavrove Starostat)
- Fedosiivka
- Flora
- Illia
- Ivanivka
- Kalistrativka
- Levantivka
- Maiaky
- Malaivtsi
- Nahirne
- Nesterove
- Nova Voliarka
- Novokrasne
- Novomykhailivka
- Novorozivka
- Novosamarka
- Novosemenivka
- Odai
- Oleksandrivka
- Omelianivka
- Platonove
- Rymarivka
- Rozivka
- Sadove
- Sahaidak
- Samarka
- Stavrove
- Stepanivka
- Tkachenka
- Topaly
- Tryhrady
- Tsekhanivka
- Ulianivka
- Untylivka
- Vasylivka
- Voliarka
- Volodymyrivka
- Vyzhyne

== Links ==
- Окнянська селищна ОТГ // Облікова картка на офіційному вебсайті Верховної Ради України.
- https://gromada.info/gromada/oknyanska/
- https://decentralization.gov.ua/gromada/1522#
- http://zakon2.rada.gov.ua/laws/show/v0022359-18
