= Slobidka, Podilsk Raion, Odesa Oblast =

Rural locality in Odesa Oblast, Ukraine

Slobidka Слобідка
- Rural settlement
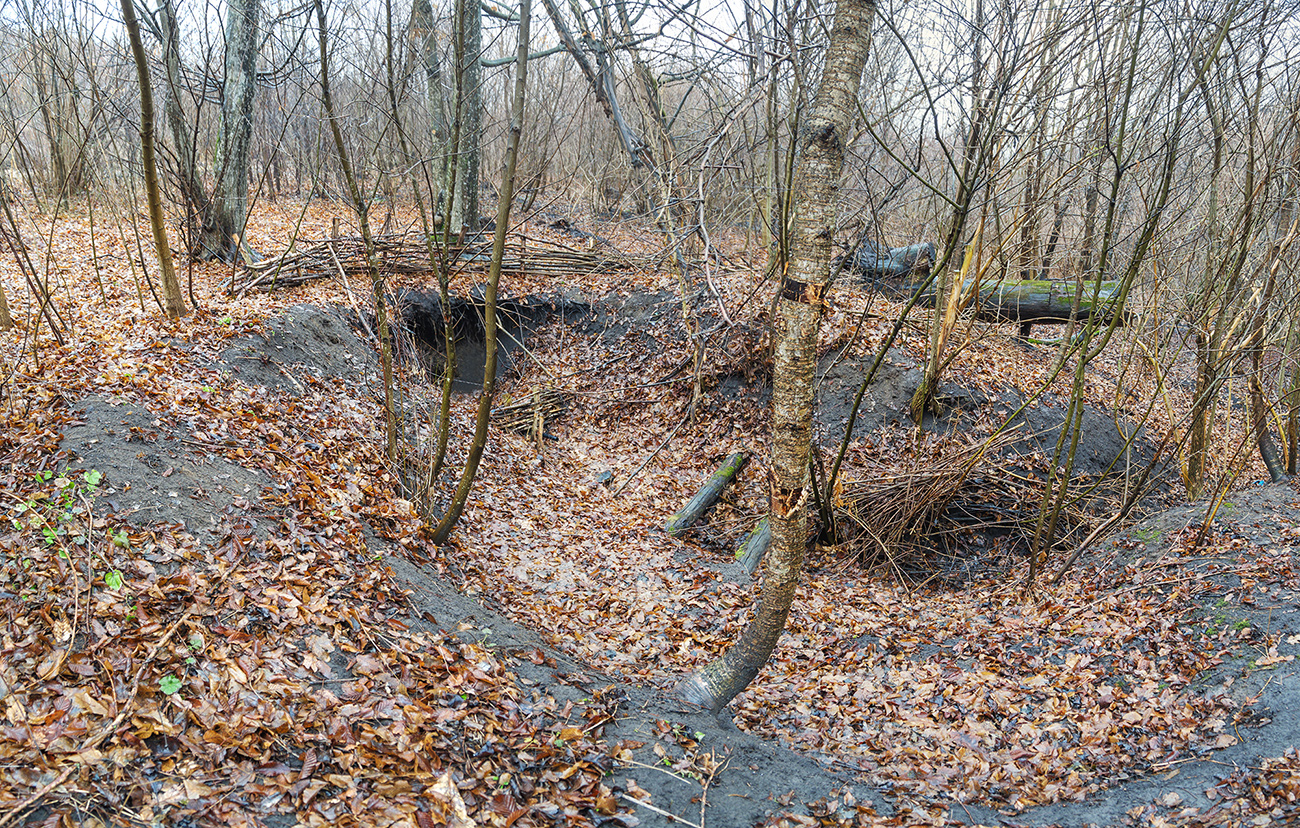

- Location within Odesa Oblast Location within Ukraine
- Coordinates: 47°53′09″N 29°20′49″E
- Country: Ukraine
- Oblast: Odesa Oblast
- Raion: Podilsk Raion
- Hromada: Slobidka settlement hromada

Population (2022)
  - Total: 2,239
- Time zone: UTC+2 (EET)
  - Summer (DST): UTC+3 (EEST)

Slobidka (Ukrainian: Слобідка; Russian: Слободка) is a rural settlement in Podilsk Raion of Odesa Oblast in Ukraine. It is located at the north of the oblast, close to the border with Moldova/Transnistria. Slobidka hosts the administration of Slobidka settlement hromada, one of the hromadas of Ukraine. The population is 2,239 (2022 estimate)

== History ==
Until 18 July 2020, Slobidka belonged to Kodyma Raion. The raion was abolished in July 2020 as part of the administrative reform of Ukraine, which reduced the number of raions of Odesa Oblast to seven. The area of Kodyma Raion was merged into Podilsk Raion.

Until 26 January 2024, Slobidka was designated urban-type settlement. On this day, a new law entered into force which abolished this status, and Slobidka became a rural settlement.

== Economy ==
=== Transportation ===
Slobidka railway station is a railway junction which has access to Odesa via Podilsk, to Kropyvnytskyi via Liubashivka, to Zhmerynka, and to Rîbnița in Transnistria. There is some passenger traffic in all these directions except for Transnistria.

Slobidka is on a road which runs from Transnistrian border to Kryve Ozero via Balta. In Kryve Ozero, it has access to Highway M05 connecting Kyiv and Odesa.
