= Balta Raion =

Former subdivision of Odesa Oblast, Ukraine

Balta Raion Балтський район
- Raion
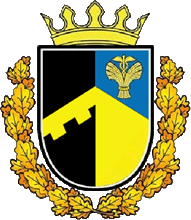
- Flag Coat of arms

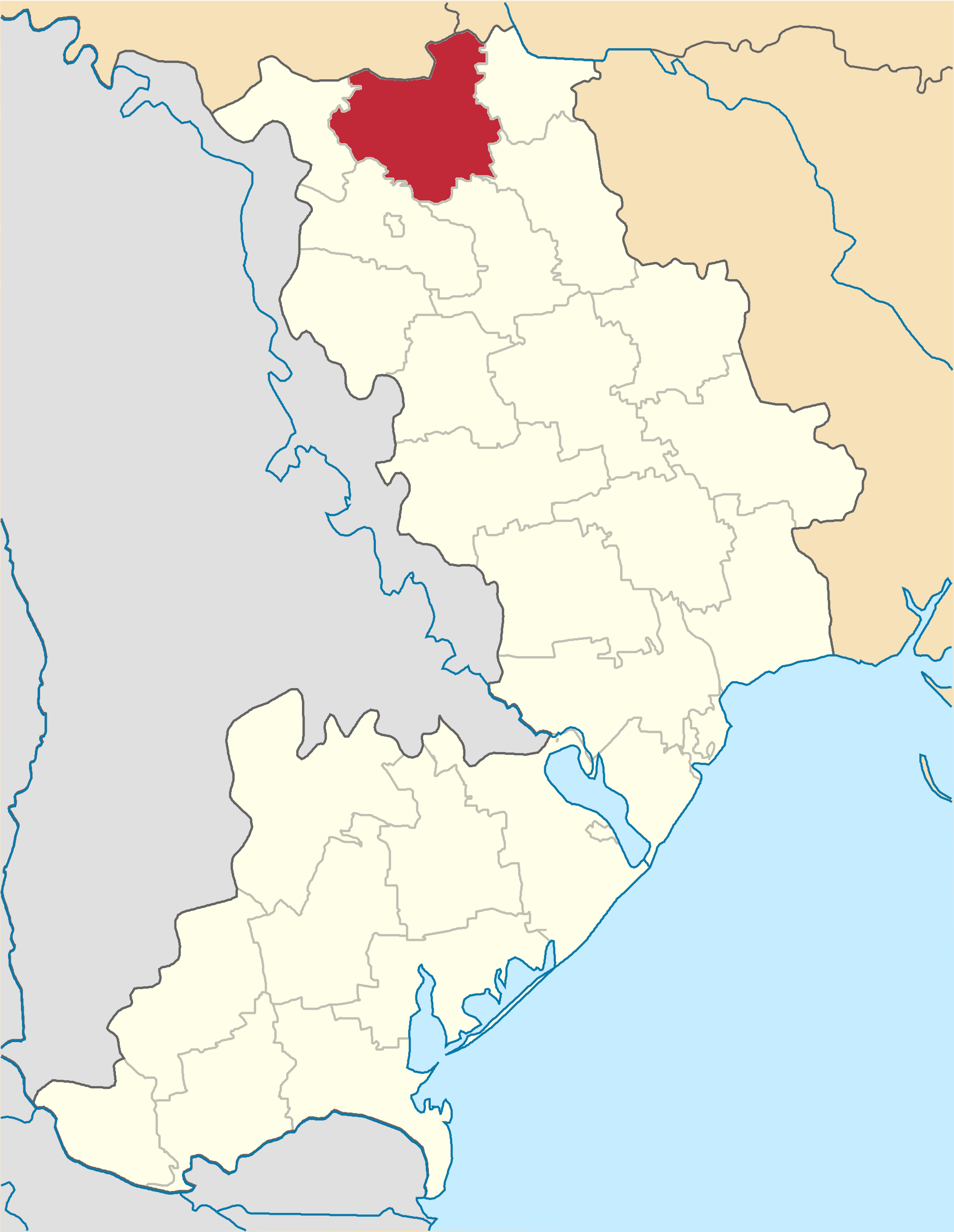
- Coordinates: 47°56′24″N 29°37′19″E
- Country: Ukraine
- Oblast: Odesa Oblast
- Established: 7 March 1923
- Disestablished: 18 July 2020
- Admin. center: Balta
- Subdivisions: List: 1 — city councils; 0 — settlement councils; 24 — rural councils; Number of localities: 1 — cities; 0 — urban-type settlements; 41 — villages; 0 — rural settlements

Area
  - Total: 1,317 km^{2} (508 sq mi)

Population (2020)
  - Total: 8,164 ▼
  - Density: 6.199/km^{2} (16.06/sq mi)
- Time zone: UTC+2 (EET)
  - Summer (DST): UTC+3 (EEST)
- Postal index: 66100—66163
- Area code: +380 4866
- Website: Official website

Balta Raion (Ukrainian: Балтський район, Balts'kyj rajon) was a raion of Odesa Oblast in southwestern Ukraine. Its administrative center was located in the city of Balta which was incorporated separately as the city of oblast significance and did not belong to the raion. The raion was abolished on 18 July 2020 as part of the administrative reform of Ukraine, which reduced the number of raions of Odesa Oblast to seven. The area of Balta Raion was merged into Podilsk Raion. The last estimate of the raion population was 8,164 (2015 est.). Its population was 48,604 (including Balta) at the 2001 Ukrainian Census.

== Geography ==
Balta Raion was located in the northern part of the Odesa Oblast.

== History ==
Balta Raion was first established on 7 March 1923 as part of a full-scale administrative reorganization of the Ukrainian Soviet Socialist Republic. Between 1924 and 1940, Balta was part of Moldavian Autonomous Soviet Socialist Republic, and then reverted to Ukraine.

Until 2016, the city of Balta was part of Balta Raion. On 4 February 2016, it was designated the city of oblast significance but remained the administrative center of the raion.

== Administrative divisions ==
Balta Raion was divided in a way that followed the general administrative scheme in Ukraine. Local government was also organized along a similar scheme nationwide. Consequently, raions were subdivided into councils, which were the prime level of administrative division in the country.

Each of the raion's urban localities administered their own councils, often containing a few other villages within its jurisdiction. However, only a handful of rural localities were organized into councils, which also might contain a few villages within its jurisdiction.

Accordingly, until 2016 Balta Raion was divided into:

- 1 city council—made up of the city of Balta (administrative center)
- 24 village councils

Overall, the raion had a total of 42 populated localities, consisting of one city, and 41 villages.

According to the 2001 census, the majority of the population of the Balta district in its boundaries at that time spoke Ukrainian (89.3%), with Russian (8.7%) and Romanian (1.5%) speakers in the minority.

At the time of disestablishment, the raion consisted of one hromadas, Pishchana rural hromada with the administration in the selo of Pishchana.
