= Okny =

Rural locality in Odesa Oblast, Ukraine

Okny Окни
- Rural settlement
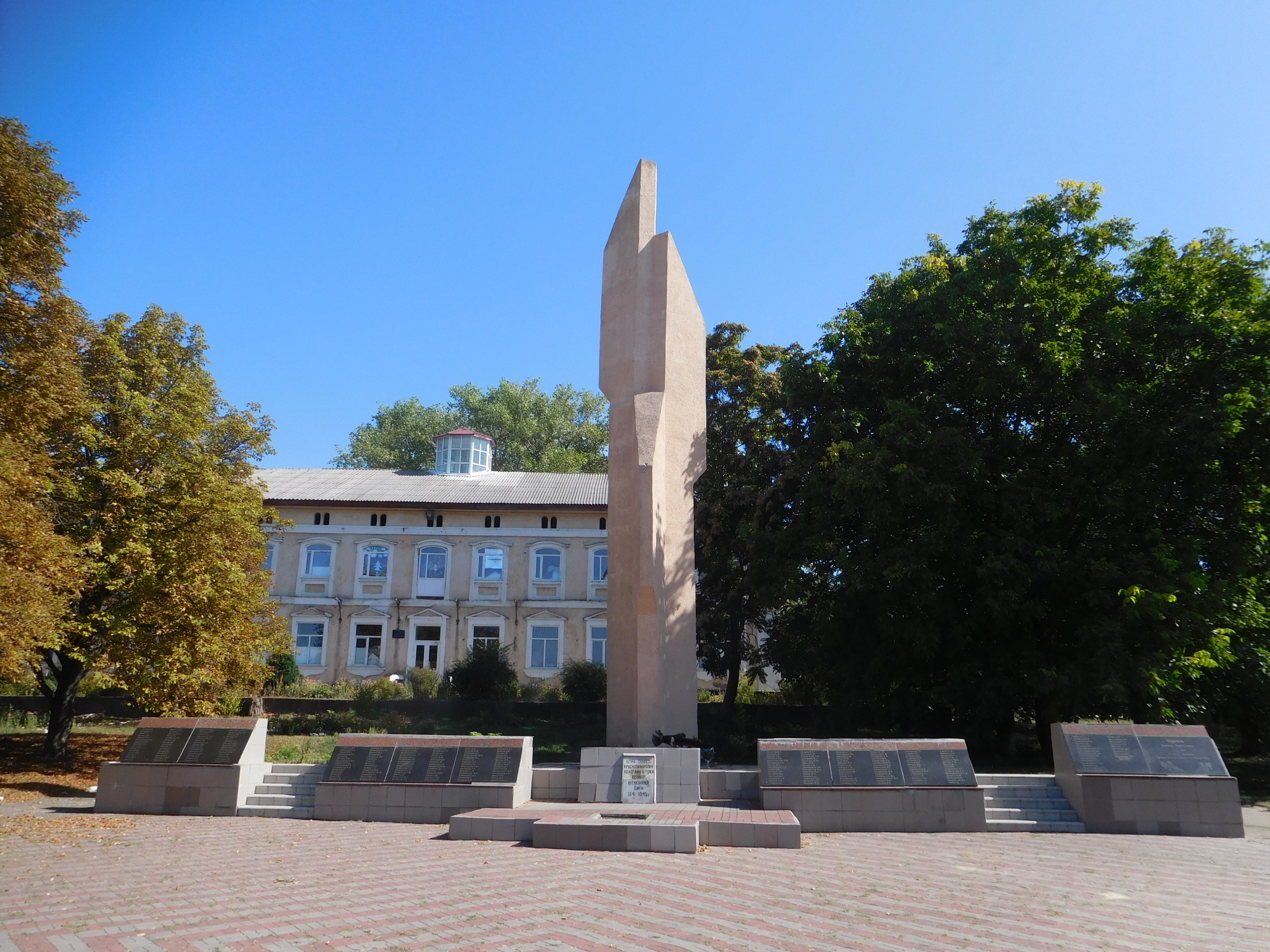

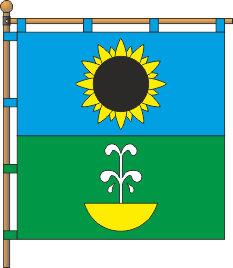
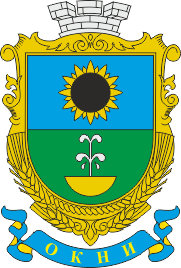
- Flag Coat of arms

- Location within Odesa Oblast Location within Ukraine
- Coordinates: 47°32′20″N 29°27′42″E
- Country: Ukraine
- Oblast: Odesa Oblast
- Raion: Podilsk Raion
- Hromada: Okny settlement hromada

Population (2022)
  - Total: 5,089
- Time zone: UTC+2 (EET)
  - Summer (DST): UTC+3 (EEST)

Okny (Ukrainian: Окни, Russian: Окны) is a rural settlement in Podilsk Raion in the west of Odesa Oblast, Ukraine. It hosts the administration of Okny settlement hromada, one of the hromadas of Ukraine. Population: 5,089 (2022 estimate).

Okny is located on the banks of the Yahorlik River, a left tributary of the Dniester.

== History ==
Okny was founded in the end of the 18th century by Moldovan settlers. The area was settled after 1792, when the lands between the Southern Bug and the Dniester were transferred to Russia according to the Iasi Peace Treaty. The area was included in Tiraspol Uyezd, which belonged to Yekaterinoslav Viceroyalty until 1795, Voznesensk Viceroyalty until 1796, Novorossiya Governorate until 1803, and Kherson Governorate until 1920. In 1834, the area was transferred to newly established Ananyiv Uyezd. In 1919, Okny was renamed Krasni Okny.

On 16 April 1920, Odesa Governorate split off, and Ananyivsky Uyezd was moved to Odesa Governorate, where it was abolished in 1921. In 1923, uyezds in Ukrainian Soviet Socialist Republic were abolished, and the governorates were divided into okruhas. Krasni Okny was included into Balta Okruha. On 3 July 1923 Alexiivka Raion with the administrative center in Krasni Okny was established. On 26 November 1924, Balta Okruha was abolished, and the area was transferred into newly established Moldavian Autonomous Soviet Socialist Republic. The raion was later renamed Krasni Okny. In 1940, Krasni Okny Raion was transferred to Odesa Oblast.

On 19 May 2016, Verkhovna Rada adopted decision to rename Krasni Okny to Okny and Krasni Okny Raion to Okny Raion conform to the law prohibiting names of Communist origin.

Okny Raion was abolished in July 2020 as part of the administrative reform of Ukraine, which reduced the number of raions of Odesa Oblast to seven. The area of Okny Raion was merged into Podilsk Raion.

Until 26 January 2024, Okny was designated urban-type settlement. On this day, a new law entered into force which abolished this status, and Okny became a rural settlement.

== Economy ==
=== Transportation ===
Okny is on the M13 highway which connects it with Kropyvnytskyi in the northeast and with the state border with the Republic of Moldova in the southwest. Beyond the border, the road crosses the unrecognized republic of Transnistria and via Dubăsari continues to Chișinău. Another road proceeds southeast via Zakharivka and Velyka Mykhailivka with a connection to Odesa.
