= Okny Raion =

Former subdivision of Odesa Oblast, Ukraine

Okny Raion Окнянський район
- Raion
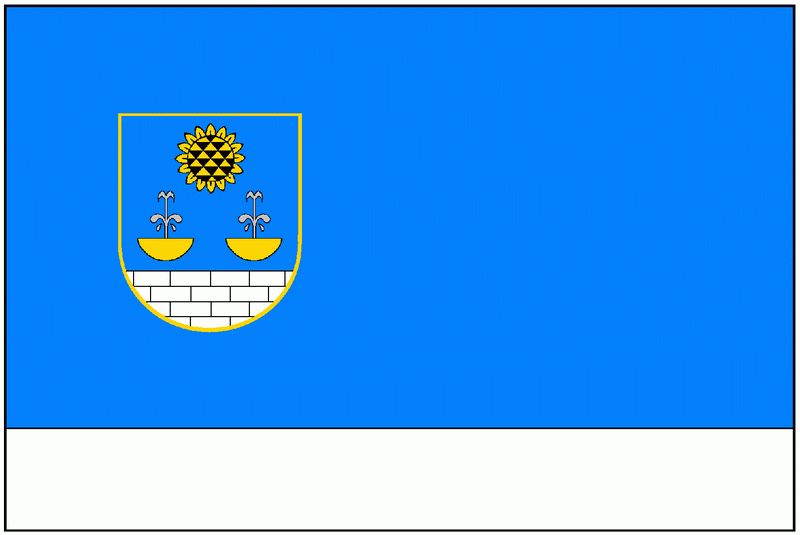
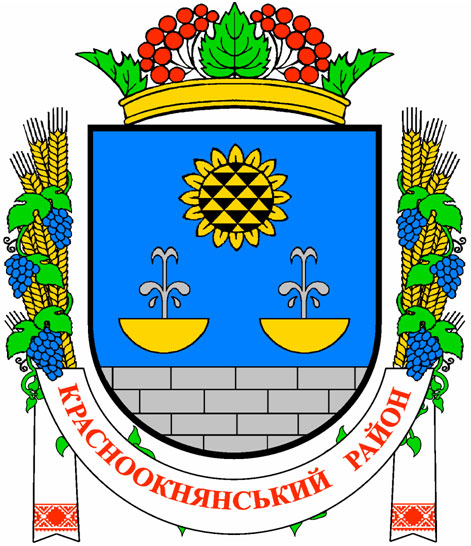
- Flag Coat of arms

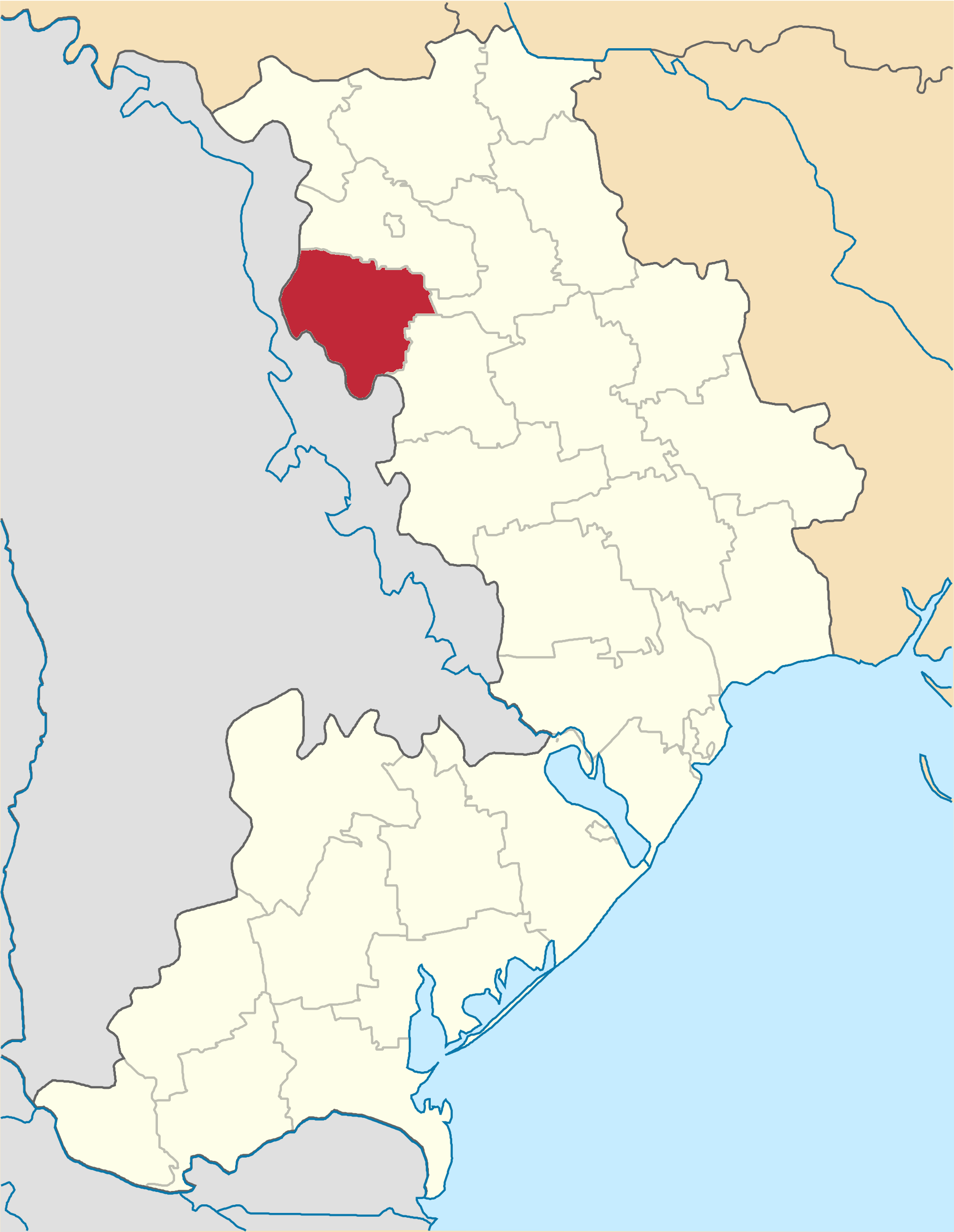
- Coordinates: 47°30′52″N 29°24′30″E
- Country: Ukraine
- Oblast: Odesa Oblast
- Established: 1923
- Disestablished: 18 July 2020
- Admin. center: Okny
- Subdivisions: List: 0 — city councils; 1 — settlement councils; 14 — rural councils; Number of localities: 0 — cities; 1 — urban-type settlements; 52 — villages; 2 — rural settlements

Government
  - Governor: Volodymyr Gavrish

Area
  - Total: 1,013 km^{2} (391 sq mi)

Population (2020)
  - Total: 19,606 ▼
  - Density: 19.35/km^{2} (50.13/sq mi)
- Time zone: UTC+02:00 (EET)
  - Summer (DST): UTC+03:00 (EEST)
- Postal index: 66600—66652
- Area code: +380 4861
- Website: http://krasnookn-rda.odessa.gov.ua

Okny Raion (Ukrainian: Окнянський район), until May 2016 Krasni Okny Raion (Ukrainian: Красноокнянський район) was a raion (district) in Odesa Oblast of Ukraine. Its administrative center was the urban-type settlement of Okny. The raion was abolished on 18 July 2020 as part of the administrative reform of Ukraine, which reduced the number of raions of Odesa Oblast to seven. The area of Okny Raion was merged into Podilsk Raion. The last estimate of the raion population was 19,606 (2020 est.).

In 2001, 11% of its population belonged to the Moldovan minority.

== Geography ==
The river of Yahorlyk divided the district into two parts: the western and eastern. The eastern part was characterized by flat calm, well - wavy terrain with a distinct plateau. The western part of the area was increased and wavy. Dominated by black earth

== Demography ==
The population of the region lived in 54 villages and settlements that were 14 rural and 1 village councils. The population as of 01.01. 2015 was 20.216, Including rural - 14.947, urban - 5.269. According to the 2001 census, the majority of the population of the district spoke Ukrainian (86.14%), with Romanian (6.86%) and Russian (6.61%) speakers in the minority.

National composition of population

Ukrainian - 67.6%

Russians - 13.4%

Moldovans - 13.2%

other nationalities - 5,8%.

Manpower area are 11.6 thousand. Pers. (54% of the total population), retirees - 5.796 thousand. Pers. (28.8% of them, 4595 - at age 875 - disability, 99 - receive social pension, 542 - for special merits to the country, including 79 women).

== Natural resources ==
Farmland - 87,168.48 hectares, including arable land - 61862.46 hectares, fallow - 6,744.58 hectares, perennial plants - 686.75 ha -2418.24 hayfields, pastures, 15,456.45 hectares.

The natural potential of the area - sand, clay and limestone are the main raw material for the production of stone and cement.

== History ==
Okny was founded in the end of the 19th century. The area was settled after 1792, when the lands between the Southern Bug and the Dniester were transferred to Russia according to the Iasi Peace Treaty. The area was included in Tiraspol Uezd, which belonged to Yekaterinoslav Viceroyalty until 1795, Voznesensk Viceroyalty until 1796, Novorossiya Governorate until 1803, and Kherson Governorate until 1920. In 1834, the area was transferred to newly established Ananyiv Uezd. In 1919, Okny was renamed Krasni Okny.

On 16 April 1920, Odesa Governorate split off, and Ananyiv Uezd was moved to Odesa Governorate, where it was abolished in 1921. In 1923, povits in Ukrainian Soviet Socialist Republic were abolished, and the governorates were divided into okruhas. Krasni Okny was included into Balta Okruha. On 3 July 1923 Alexiivka Raion with the administrative center in Krasni Okny was established. On 26 November 1924, Balta Okruha was abolished, and the area was transferred into newly established Moldavian Autonomous Soviet Socialist Republic. The raion was later renamed Krasni Okny. In 1940, Krasni Okny Raion was transferred to Odesa Oblast.

On 19 May 2016, Verkhovna Rada adopted decision to rename Krasni Okny Raion to Okny Raion and Krasni Okny to Okny conform to the law prohibiting names of Communist origin.

At the time of disestablishment, the raion consisted of one hromada, Okny settlement hromada with the administration in Okny.

== Industry ==
Products manufactured (specialization)

Ltd. "Mine" Dovzhanka ". Sspecialization stone - limestone

Ltd. "Mine" Horyachivka ". Specialization stone - limestone

LLC "Timdress Debeteks". Specialization Special clothes

Sales of industrial products area for 8 months of 2015 amounted to 5 mln. 218.9 thousand,

LLC "Timdress Debeteks" for 8 months in 2015 the clothing sold products worth 4 mln. 737.7 thous.

Sales volumes of stone - limestone LLC "Mine" Horyachivka "for 8 months of 2015 amounted to 2,172 m3 totaling 288.1 thousand. UAH.

Sales volumes of stone - limestone LLC "Mine" Dovzhanka "for 8 months of 2015 amounted to 989 m3 totaling 193.1 thousand. UAH.

== Agriculture ==
The total area of agricultural land, including - 61,804 ha

According to data as of July 30, 2015

threshed 28,632 hectares of early grain and leguminous crops. harvested 77,084 tons of corn, the yield is 26.9 centners/ ha.

Completed harvesting winter barley on the area of 7099 hectares, 19,309 tons of harvested crops, yield 27.2 c / ha and 57 ha winter rye, harvested 188 tons, yield 33.0 c / ha, oats harvested on the area of 294 hectares harvested 740, yield 25.2 c / ha, 173 ha of spring wheat, harvested 311 tons, yield 18.0 c / ha.

Complete collection of winter rape area to 109 hectares harvested 218 tons, yield 20.0 c / ha. Complete collection of pea area 1,889 hectares harvested 1,965 tons, yield 10.4 c / ha, winter wheat harvested on the area of 16,496 hectares, 49,323 tons of grain threshed, yield 29.9 c / ha, spring barley harvested on the area of 2,624 hectares harvested 5248 tons, yield 20.0 c / ha.

In general winter grain crops harvested on the area of 23,652 hectares, 68,820 tons of grain threshed, yield is 29.1 centners / ha,

In the harvest of the current year were involved 176 combine harvesters

On 1 September 2015 in the area there are cattle incl 6746 cows - 3,439 5,895 pigs., 3335 sheep and goats, poultry - 120.9 thousand.

== Trade and consumer services ==
The district had 175 retail facilities retail trade; 19 - public catering; 11 - Consumer Services 1 - market

== Medicine ==
Medical service provided by: Krasnooknyanska central district hospital, which consisted of five departments (internal medicine, maternity, infectious, surgical, children); Krasnooknyanskyy district center of primary health care, which included - clinic of general practice of family medicine (s.Mayak, s.Stavrovo, s.Chorna and 24 medical centers
