= Podilsk Raion =

Subdivision of Odesa Oblast, Ukraine

Podilsk Raion Подільський район Raionul Bârzula
- Raion
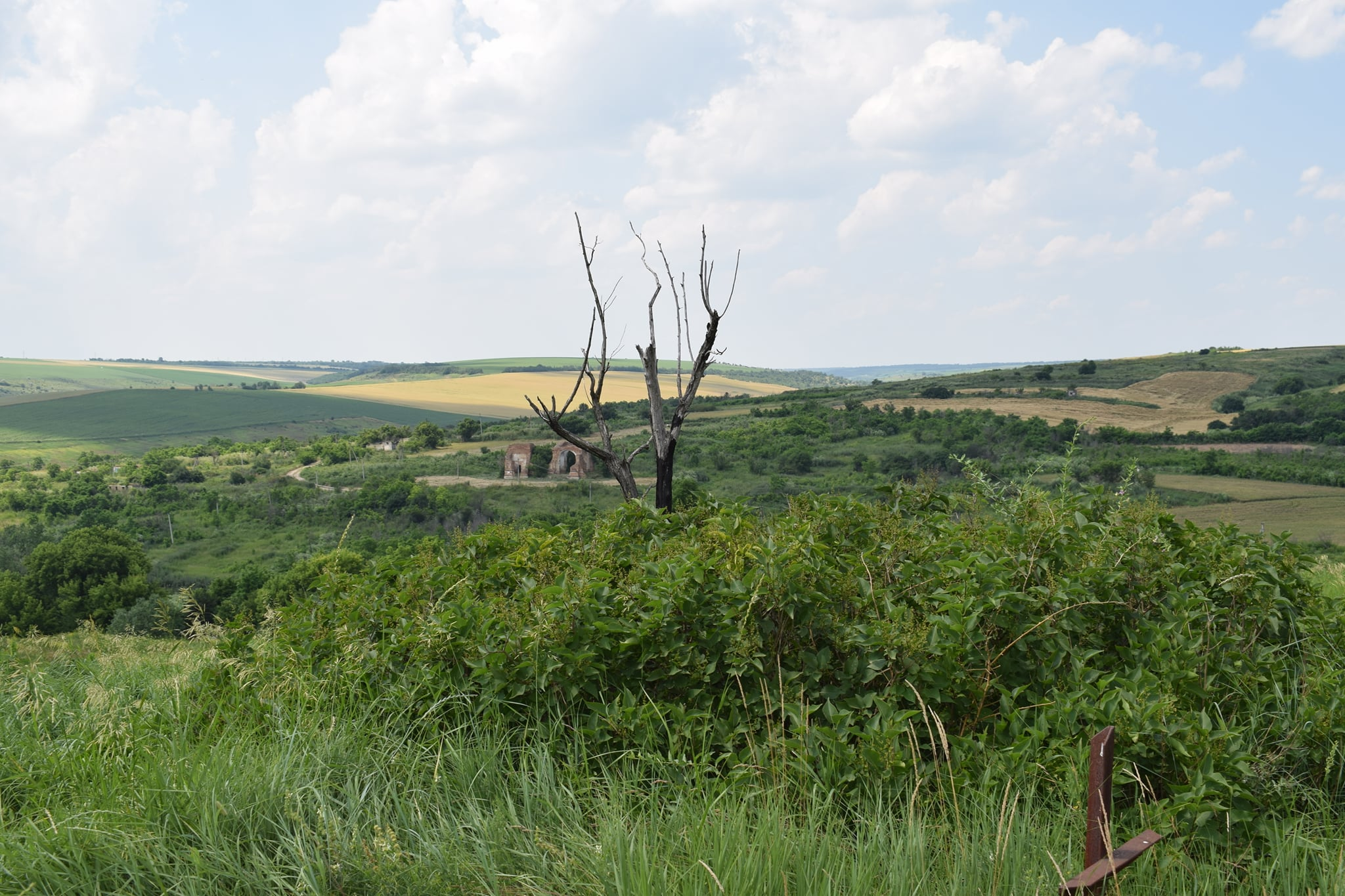

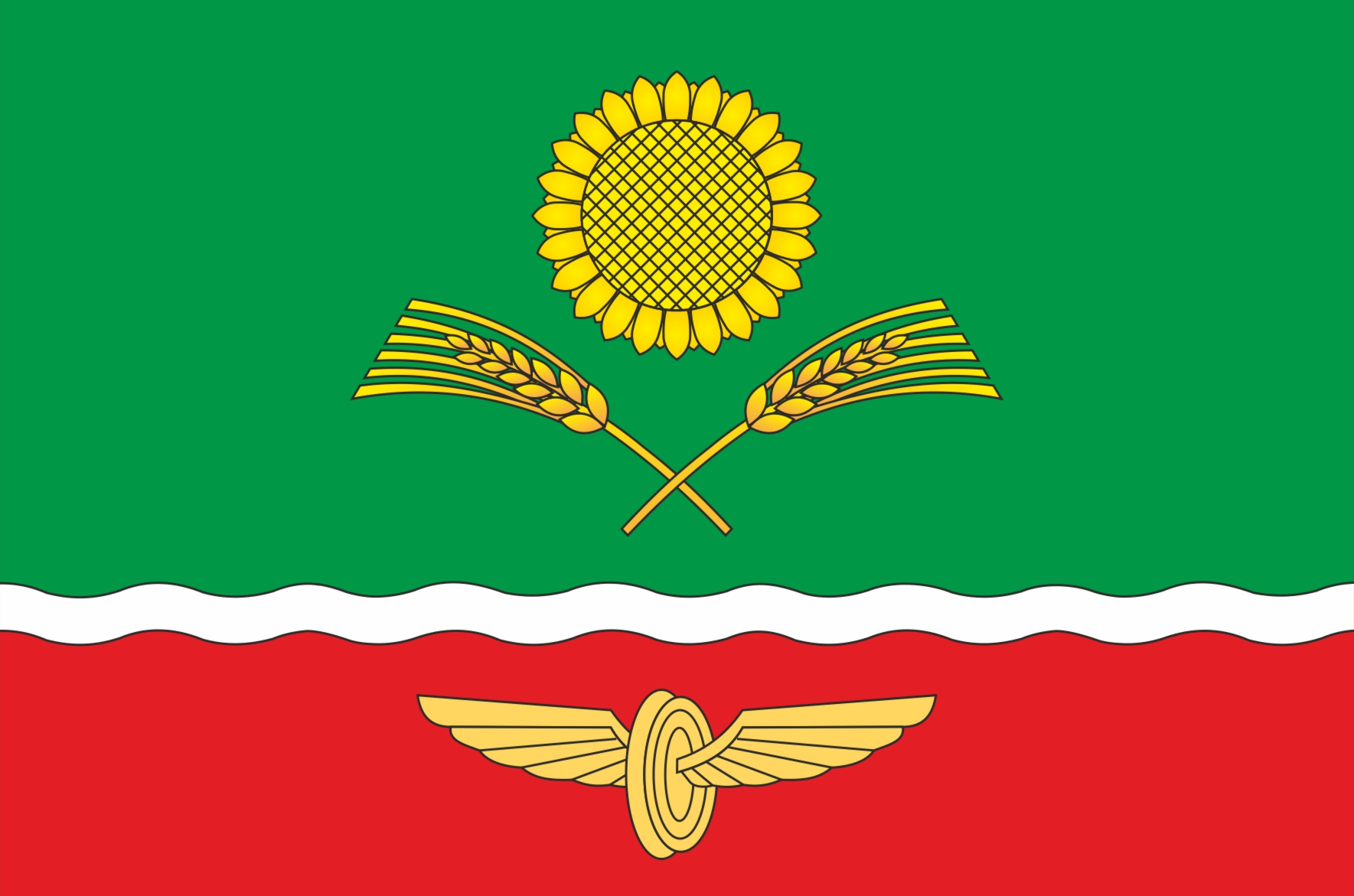
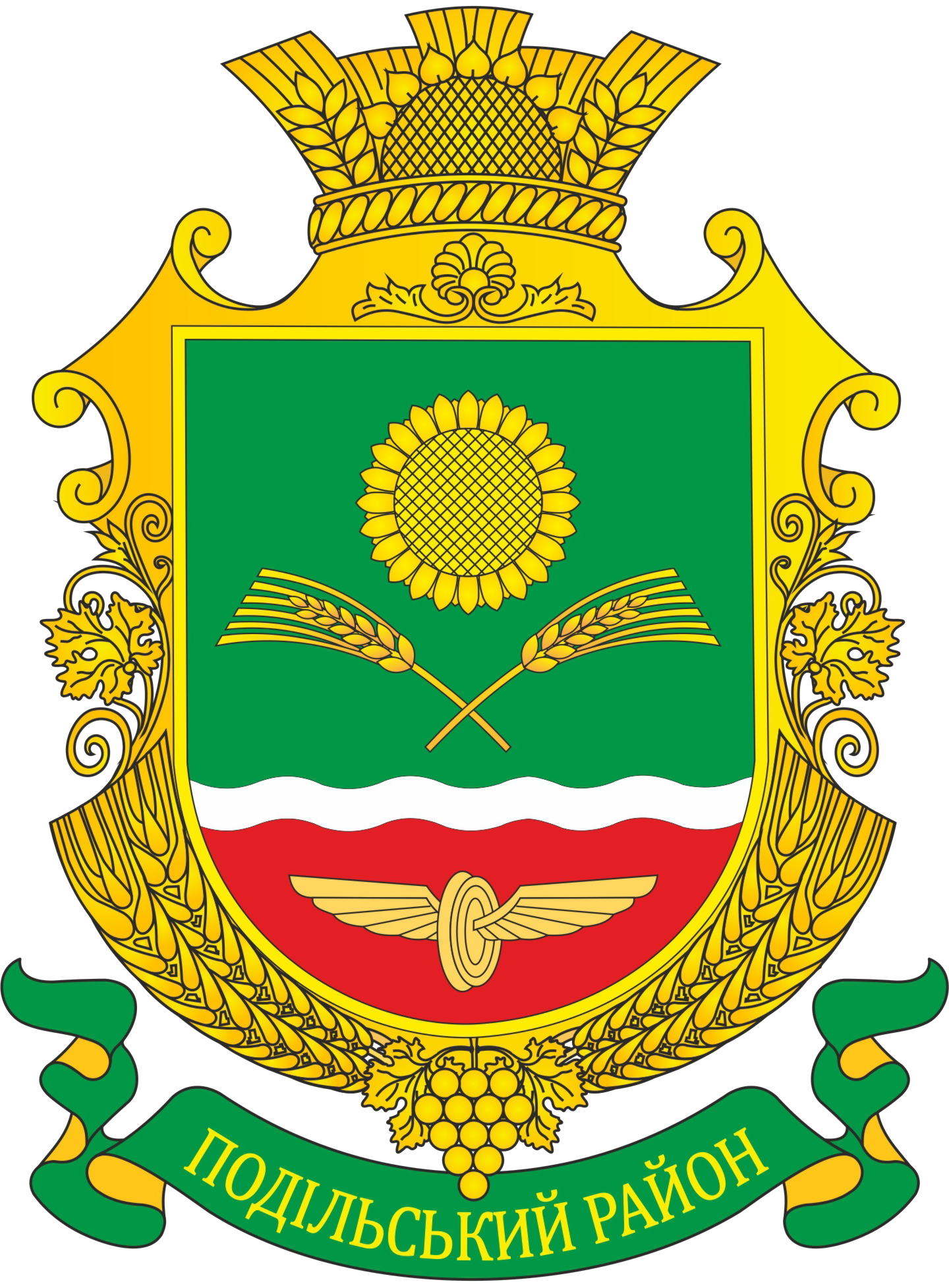
- Flag Coat of arms

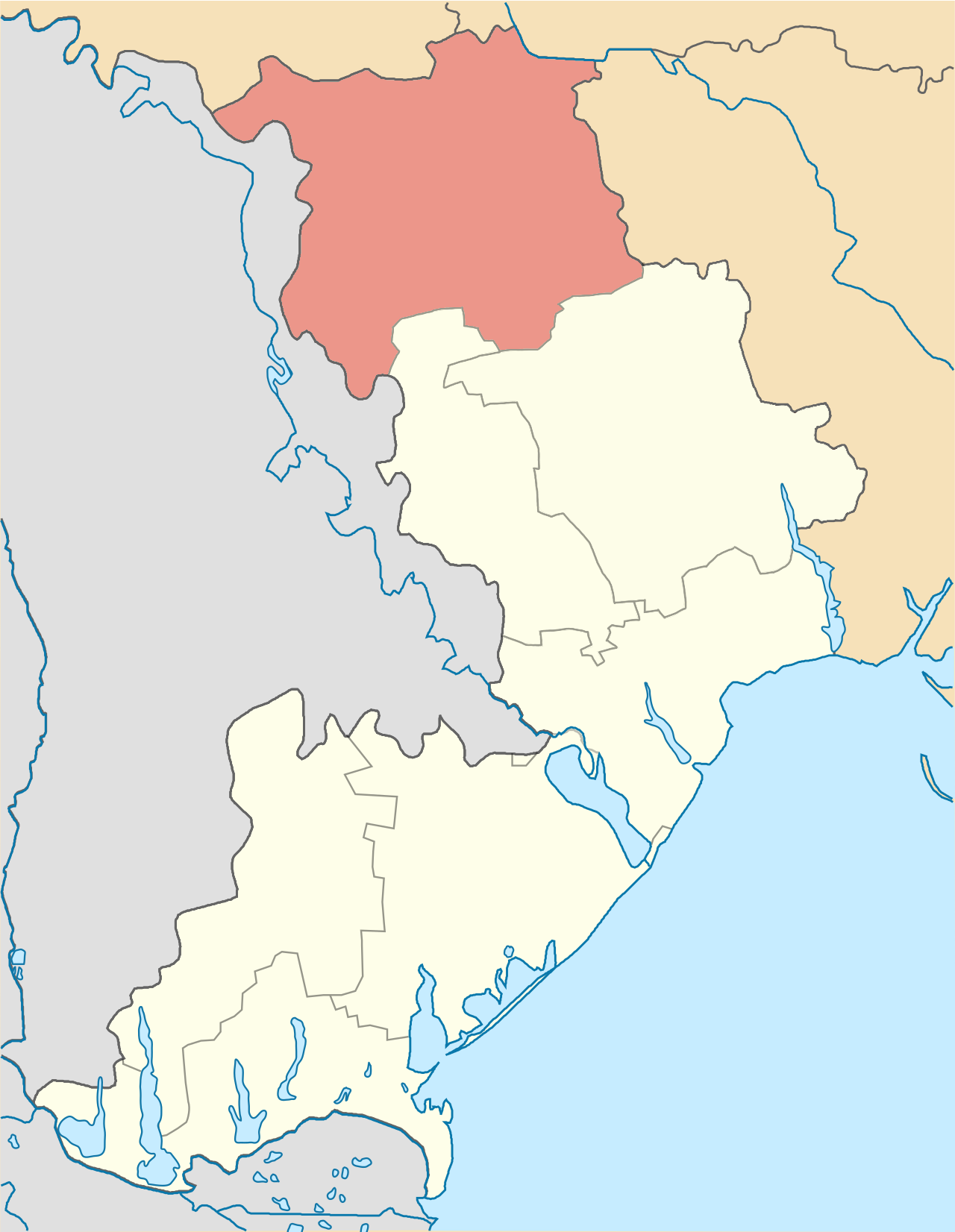
- Coordinates: 47°42′29″N 29°32′17″E
- Country: Ukraine
- Oblast: Odesa Oblast
- Established: 1923
- Admin. center: Podilsk
- Subdivisions: 12 hromadas

Government
  - Governor: Volodymyr Syn'ko

Area: since July 2020
  - Total: 7,078.58 km^{2} (2,733.06 sq mi)

Population (2022)
  - Total: 220,786
  - Density: 31.1907/km^{2} (80.7836/sq mi)
- Time zone: UTC+02:00 (EET)
  - Summer (DST): UTC+03:00 (EEST)
- Postal index: 66300—66383
- Area code: +380 4862
- Website: https://podilska-gromada.gov.ua/

Podilsk Raion (Ukrainian: Подільський район; Romanian: Raionul Bârzula), known until 2015 as Kotovsk Raion (Ukrainian: Котовський район), is a raion (district) in Odesa Oblast of Ukraine. Its administrative center is the city of Podilsk. Population: 220,786 (2022 estimate).

On 18 July 2020, as part of the administrative reform of Ukraine, the number of raions of Odesa Oblast was reduced to seven, and the area of Podilsk Raion was significantly expanded. Six abolished raions, Ananiv, Balta, Kodyma, Liubashivka, Okny, and Savran Raions, as well as Balta Municipality and the city of Podilsk, which was previously incorporated as a city of oblast significance and did not belong to the raion, were merged into Podilsk Raion. The January 2020 estimate of the raion population was 25,524 (2020 est.).

In the 2001 census, 14.8% of its population declared to be native speakers of "Moldovan" (Romanian).

On 21 May 2016, the Verkhovna Rada adopted a decision to rename Kotovsk Raion to Podilsk Raion and Kotovsk to Podilsk according to the law prohibiting names of communist origin.

== Administrative division ==
=== Current ===
After the reform in July 2020, the raion consisted of 12 hromadas:

- Ananiv urban hromada with the administration in the city of Ananiv, transferred from Ananiv Raion;
- Balta urban hromada with the administration in the city of Balta, transferred from Balta Municipality;
- Dolynske rural hromada with the administration in the village of Dolynske, transferred from Ananiv Raion;
- Kodyma urban hromada with the administration in the city of Kodyma, transferred from Kodyma Raion;
- Kuialnyk rural hromada with the administration in the village of Kuialnyk, retained from Podilsk raion;
- Liubashivka settlement hromada with the administration in the rural settlement of Liubashivka, transferred from Liubashivka Raion;
- Okny settlement hromada with the administration in the rural settlement of Okny, transferred from Okny Raion;
- Pishchana rural hromada with the administration in the village of Pishchana, transferred from Balta Raion;
- Podilsk urban hromada with the administration in the city of Podilsk, transferred from the city of oblast significance of Podilsk;
- Savran settlement htromada with the administration in the rural settlement of Savran, transferred from Savran Raion.
- Slobidka settlement hromada with the administration in the rural settlement of Slobidka, transferred from Kodyma Raion;
- Zelenohirske settlement hromada with the administration in the rural settlement of Zelenohirske, transferred from Liubashivka Raion.

=== Before 2020 ===
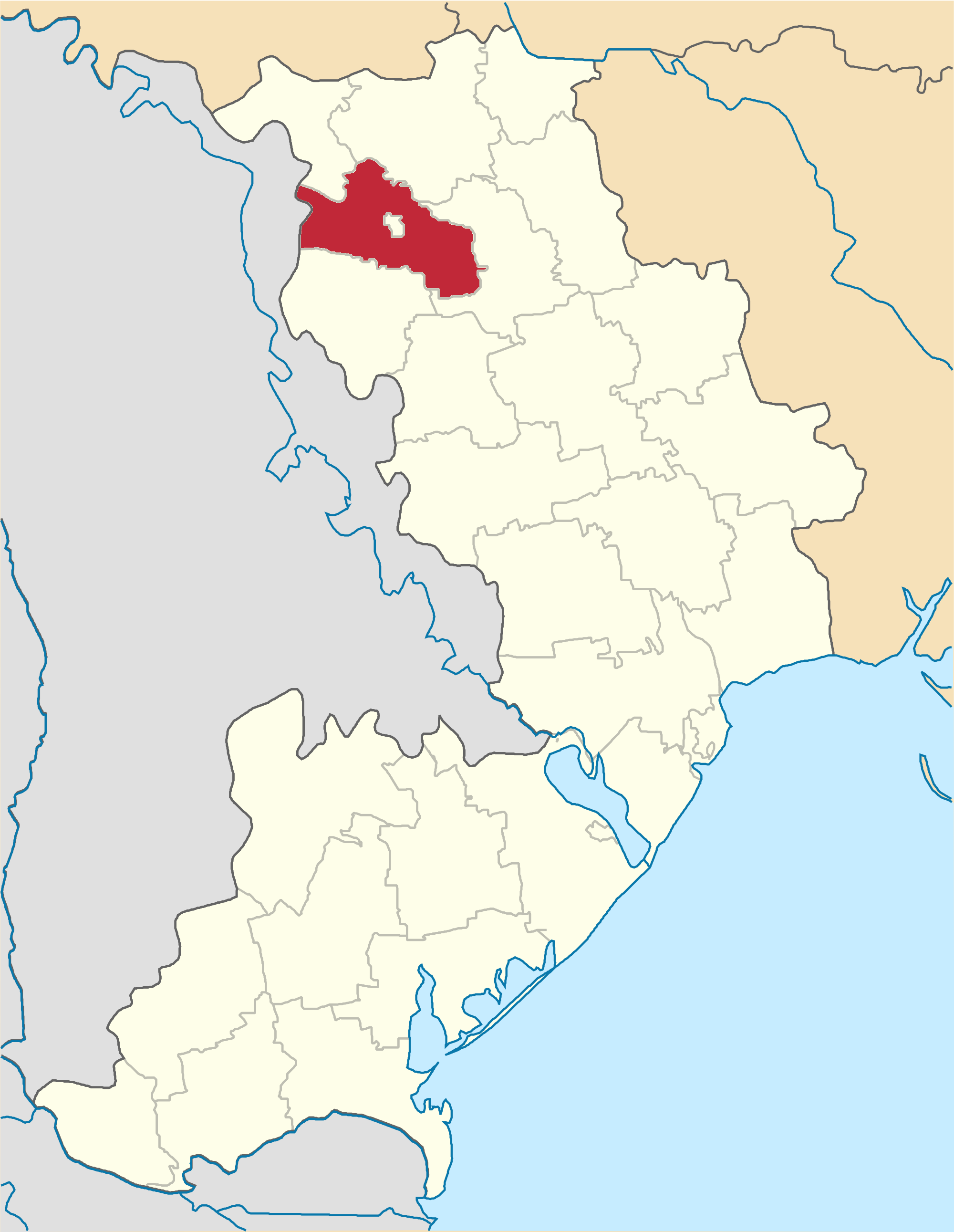
Podilsk Raion in Odesa Oblast (1966-2020)

Before the 2020 reform, the raion consisted of one hromada, Kuialnyk rural hromada with the administration in Kuialnyk.
