= Ivanivka Raion, Odesa Oblast =

Former subdivision of Odesa Oblast, Ukraine

Coordinates: 46°56′N 30°32′E

Ivanivka Raion Іванівський район
- Raion
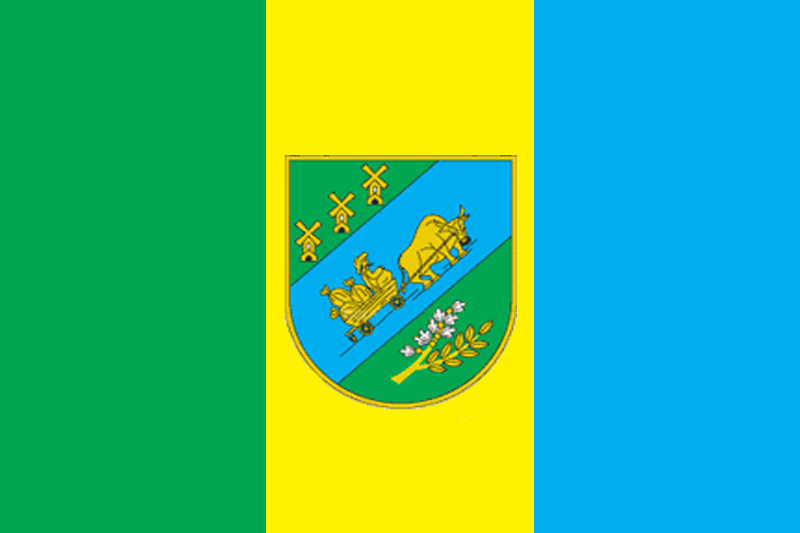
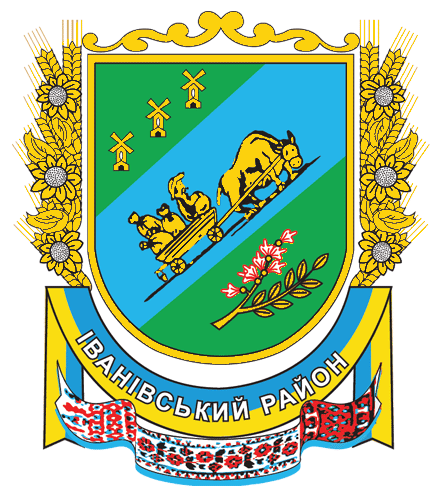
- Flag Coat of arms

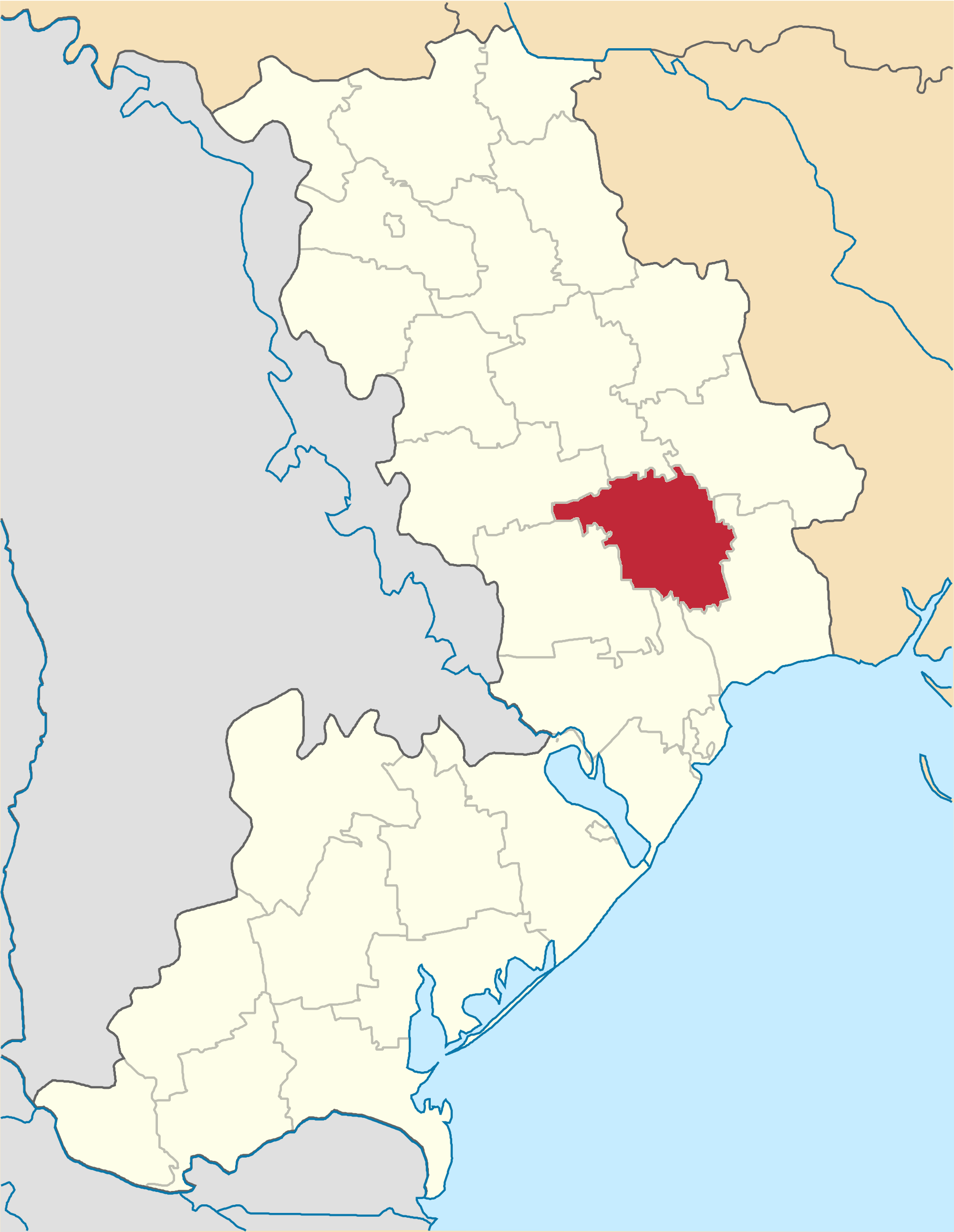
- Country: Ukraine
- Oblast: Odesa Oblast
- Established: 3 July 1923
- Disestablished: 17 July 2020
- Admin. center: Ivanivka
- Subdivisions: List: 0 — city councils; 3 — settlement councils; 10 — rural councils; Number of localities: 0 — cities; 3 — urban-type settlements; 43 — villages; 0 — rural settlements

Government
  - Governor: Natalya Byanova

Area
  - Total: 1,162 km^{2} (449 sq mi)

Population (2020)
  - Total: 25,743 ▼
  - Density: 22.15/km^{2} (57.38/sq mi)
- Time zone: UTC+02:00 (EET)
  - Summer (DST): UTC+03:00 (EEST)
- Postal index: 67200—67253
- Area code: +380 4854
- Website: http://ivanivka-rda.odessa.gov.ua

Ivanivka Raion (Ukrainian: Іванівський район) was a raion (district) in Odesa Oblast of Ukraine. Its administrative center was the urban-type settlement of Ivanivka. The Velykyi Kuialnyk flowed through the district. The raion was abolished on 18 July 2020 as part of the administrative reform of Ukraine, which reduced the number of raions of Odesa Oblast to seven. The area of Ivanivka Raion was merged into Berezivka Raion. The last estimate of the raion population was 25,743 (2020 est.).

== History ==
Ivanivka was founded in the end of the 19th century as Malaya Baranovka (Mala Baranivka), named after the landowner Baranov. The area was settled after 1792, when the lands between the Southern Bug and the Dniester were transferred to Russia according to the Iasi Peace Treaty. The area was included in Tiraspol Uyezd, which belonged to Yekaterinoslav Viceroyalty until 1795, Voznesensk Viceroyalty until 1796, Novorossiya Governorate until 1803, and Kherson Governorate until 1920. In 1825, the area was transferred to newly established Odessa Uyezd. In 1858, Malaya Baranovka was renamed Yanovka (Yanivka) after another landowner, Jan Lemper.

On 16 April 1920, Odesa Governorate split off, and Odessky Uyezd was moved to Odesa Governorate. In 1923, uyezds in Ukrainian Soviet Socialist Republic were abolished, and the governorates were divided into okruhas. The area was included into Odesa Okruha. On 3 July 1923 Yanivka Raion with the administrative center in Yanivka was established. In 1930, okruhas were abolished, and on 27 February 1932, Odesa Oblast was established, and Yanivka Raion was included into Odesa Oblast. In 1946, Yanivka was renamed Ivanivka, and Yanivka Raion was renamed Ivanivka Raion.

== Administrative divisions ==
At the time of disestablishment, the raion consisted of four hromadas:

- Ivanivka settlement hromada with the administration in Ivanivka;
- Konopliane rural hromada with the administration in the selo of Konopliane;
- Velykyi Buialyk rural hromada with the administration in the selo of Velykyi Buialyk;
- Znamianka rural hromada with the administration in the selo of Znamianka.
