= Severynivka, Odesa Oblast =

Village in Ukraine

Severynivka Северинівка
- Village
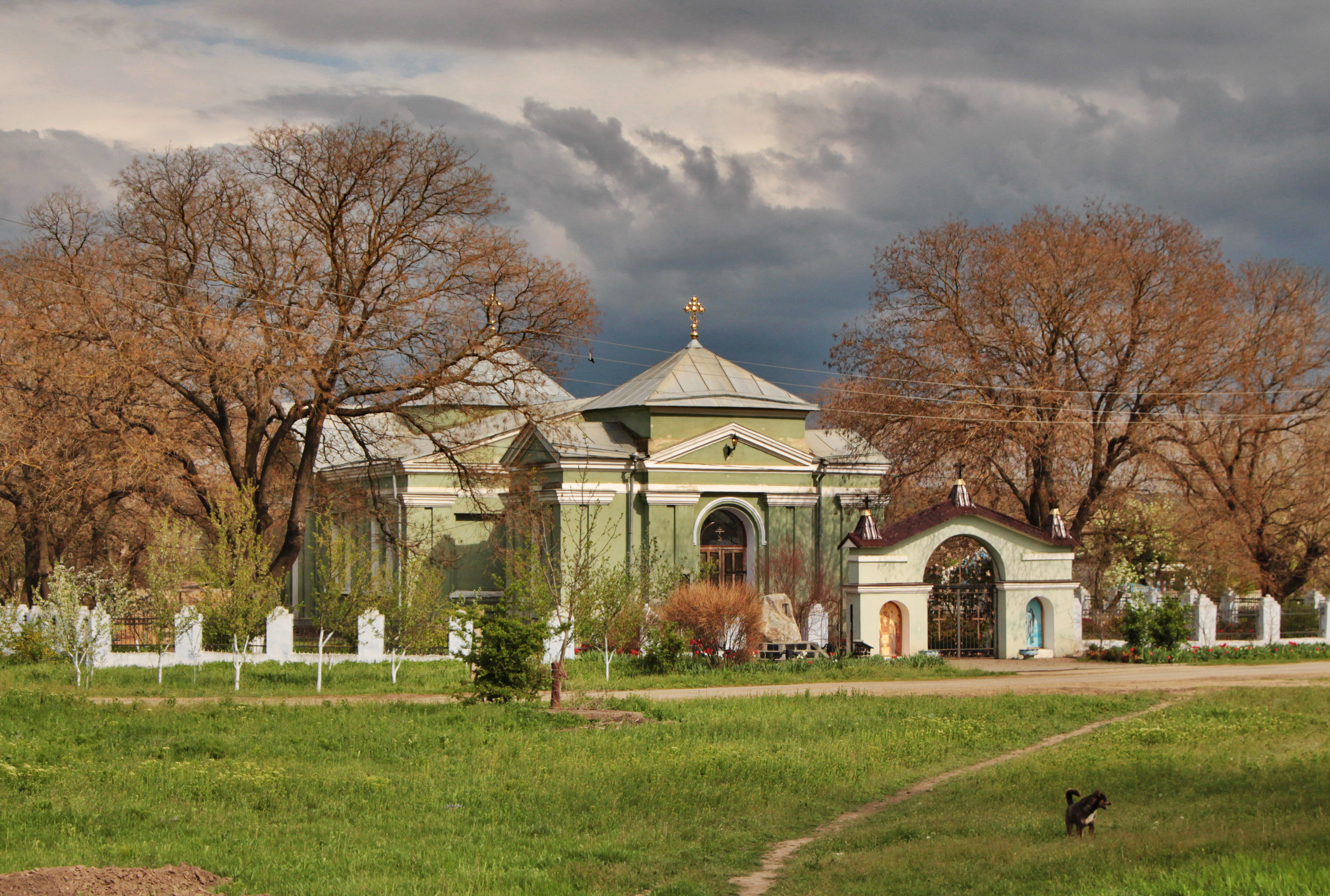
- Saint John the Evangelist church

- Location within Ukraine
- Coordinates: 46°49′38″N 30°34′50″E
- Country: Ukraine
- Oblast: Odesa Oblast
- Raion: Berezivka Raion
- Hromada: Ivanivka settlement hromada
- Founder: Seweryn Potocki
- Named for: Seweryn Potocki
- Time zone: UTC+2 (EET)
  - Summer (DST): UTC+3 (EEST)

Severynivka (Ukrainian: Северинівка, Polish: Sewerynówka) is a village in the Ivanivka settlement hromada, Berezivka Raion, Odesa Oblast, in southern Ukraine.

It was previously a town, founded by Polish nobleman Seweryn Potocki. It was known in Polish as Potockie and Sewerynówka.

== Sights ==
There are two churches built around 1800 shortly after the foundation of the town, i.e. the Catholic Saint Severin church (now in ruins) and the Orthodox Saint John the Evangelist church. There is also a bilingual Ukrainian-Polish monument to Seweryn Potocki, founder of the town.
