= Buialyk =

Rural locality in Odesa Oblast, Ukraine

Buialyk Буялик
- Rural settlement
- Location within Odesa Oblast Location within Ukraine
- Coordinates: 46°54′35″N 30°43′21″E
- Country: Ukraine
- Oblast: Odesa Oblast
- Raion: Berezivka Raion
- Hromada: Velykyi Buialyk rural hromada

Population (2022)
  - Total: 4,435
- Time zone: UTC+2 (EET)
  - Summer (DST): UTC+3 (EEST)

Buialyk (Ukrainian: Буялик), formerly known as Petrivka (Ukrainian: Петрівка; Russian: Петровка), is a rural settlement in Berezivka Raion of Odesa Oblast in Ukraine. It is located in the steppe, about 50 kilometres (31 mi) north of the city of Odesa. Petrivka belongs to Velykyi Buialyk rural hromada, one of the hromadas of Ukraine. Population: 4,435 (2022 estimate)

== History ==
Until 18 July 2020, Buialyk (then Petrivka) belonged to Ivanivka Raion. The raion was abolished in July 2020 as part of the administrative reform of Ukraine, which reduced the number of raions of Odesa Oblast to seven. The area of Ivanivka Raion was merged into Berezivka Raion.

Until 26 January 2024, Petrivka was designated urban-type settlement. On this day, a new law entered into force which abolished this status, and Petrivka became a rural settlement.

In September 2024, by the decision of the Verkhovna Rada, Petrivka was renamed to Buialyk.

== Economy ==
=== Transportation ===
Buialyk railway station is located on the railway connecting Odesa and Kropyvnytskyi via Novoukrainka. There is some passenger traffic.

The settlement is connected by road with Odesa, Voznesensk, and has access to Highway M05 which connects Kyiv and Odesa.
