= Velykyi Buialyk =

Rural locality in Odesa Oblast, Ukraine

Velykyi Buialyk Великий Буялик
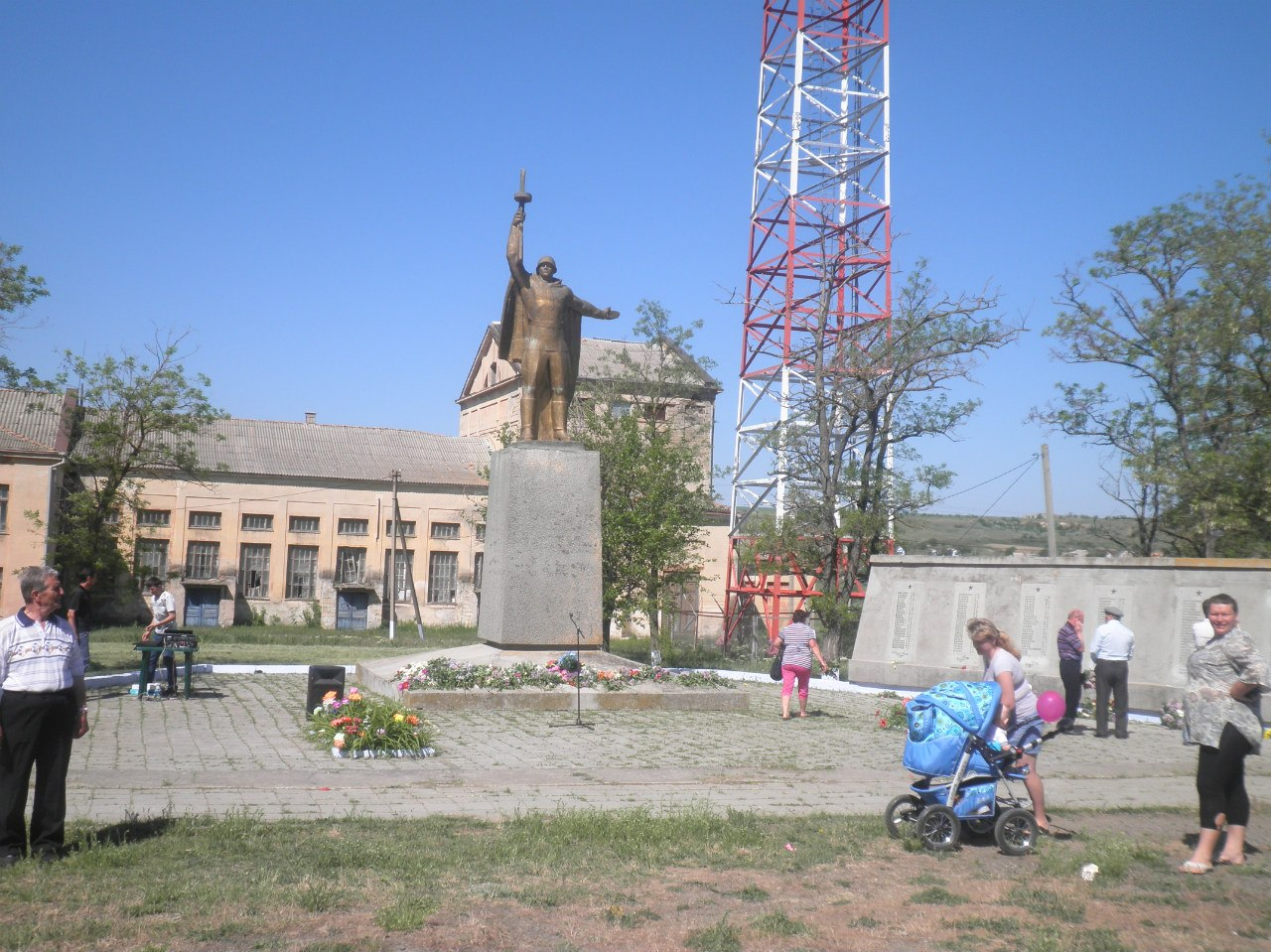

- Location within Odesa Oblast Location within Ukraine
- Coordinates: 46°56′5″N 30°38′57″E
- Country: Ukraine
- Oblast: Odesa Oblast
- Raion: Berezivka Raion
- Hromada: Velykyi Buialyk rural hromada
- Village founded: 1802 (Velykyi Buialyk); 1923-2016 (Blahoіeve)

Area
  - Total: 5,308 km^{2} (2,049 sq mi)
- Elevation: 20 m (66 ft)

Population (2004)
  - Total: 1,694
  - Density: 319.14/km^{2} (826.6/sq mi)
- Time zone: UTC+2 (EET (Kyiv))
  - Summer (DST): UTC+3 (EEST)
- Postal code: 67224
- Area code: +380 4854

Velykyi Buialyk (Ukrainian: Великий Буялик, Bulgarian: Голям Буялък) is a village in Berezivka Raion, Odesa Oblast, Ukraine. It hosts the administration of Velykyi Buialyk rural hromada, one of the hromadas of Ukraine. The village has a population of 1,694.

Established as Velykyi Buialyk in 1802 by Bulgarian refugees from the Ottoman Empire, the village was renamed in 1923 as Blahoіeve (Russian Blagoievo) after the Bulgarian thinker Dimitar Blagoev.

Until 18 July 2020, Velykyi Buialyk belonged to Ivanivka Raion. The raion was abolished in July 2020 as part of the administrative reform of Ukraine, which reduced the number of raions of Odesa Oblast to seven. The area of Ivanivka Raion was merged into Berezivka Raion.
