= Velykyi Kuialnyk =

Coordinates: 46°47′52″N 30°35′33″E

Velykyi Kuialnyk River
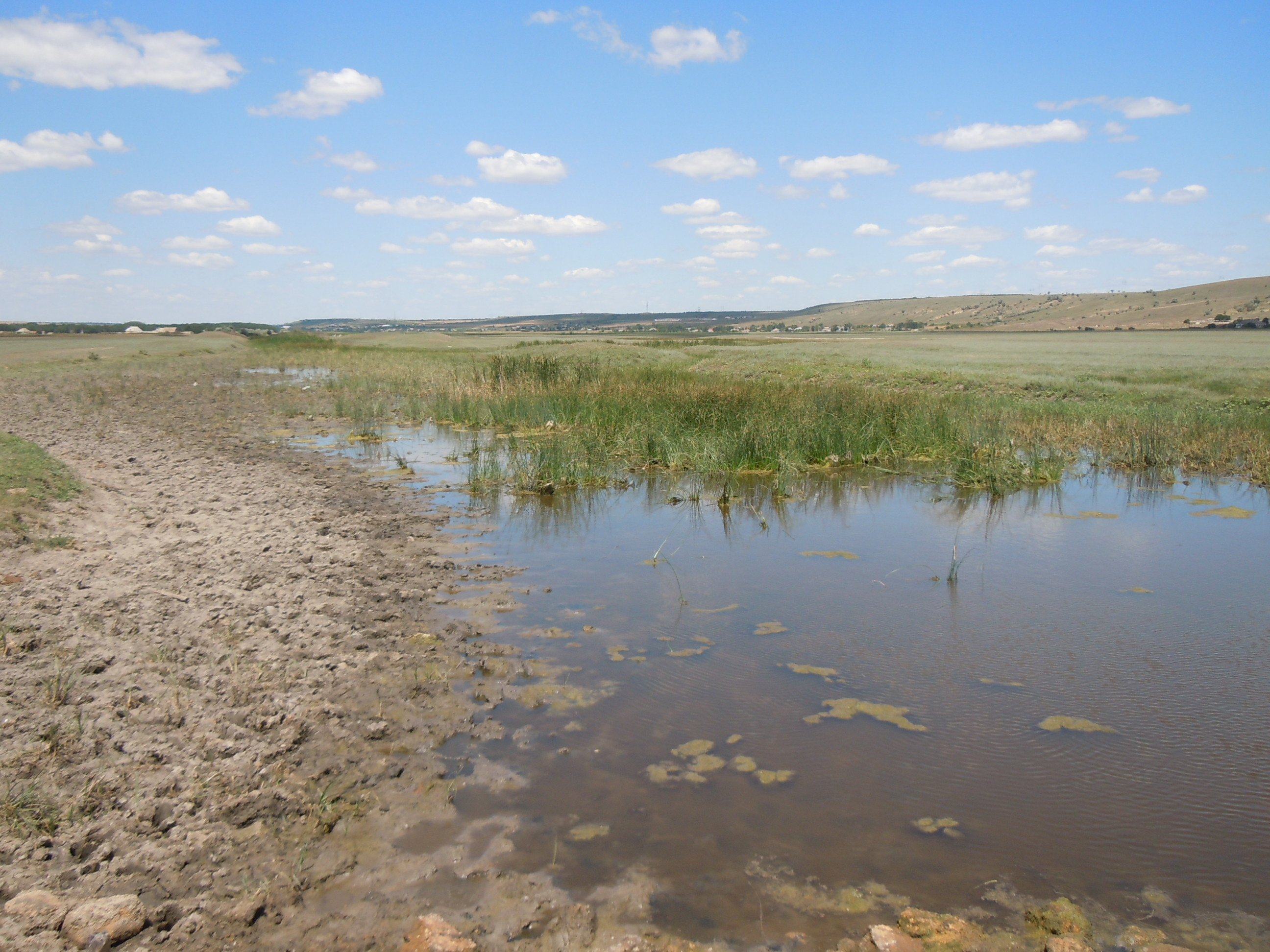
- The lower course

Location
- Country: Ukraine

Physical characteristics
- Mouth
  - location: Kuialnyk Estuary
- Length: 150 km (93 mi)
- Basin size: 1,860 km^{2} (720 sq mi)

The Velykyi Kuialnyk (Ukrainian: Великий Куяльник) or Bolshoy Kuyalnik (Russian: Большой Куяльник) is a river in Podilsk and Berezivka Raions of Odesa Oblast, Ukraine. It flows into the Kuialnyk Estuary of the Black Sea. The river spans 150 kilometres (93 mi), with a drainage basin covering 1,860 square kilometres (720 sq mi). The urban-type settlements of Shyriaieve and Ivanivka are located along its banks.

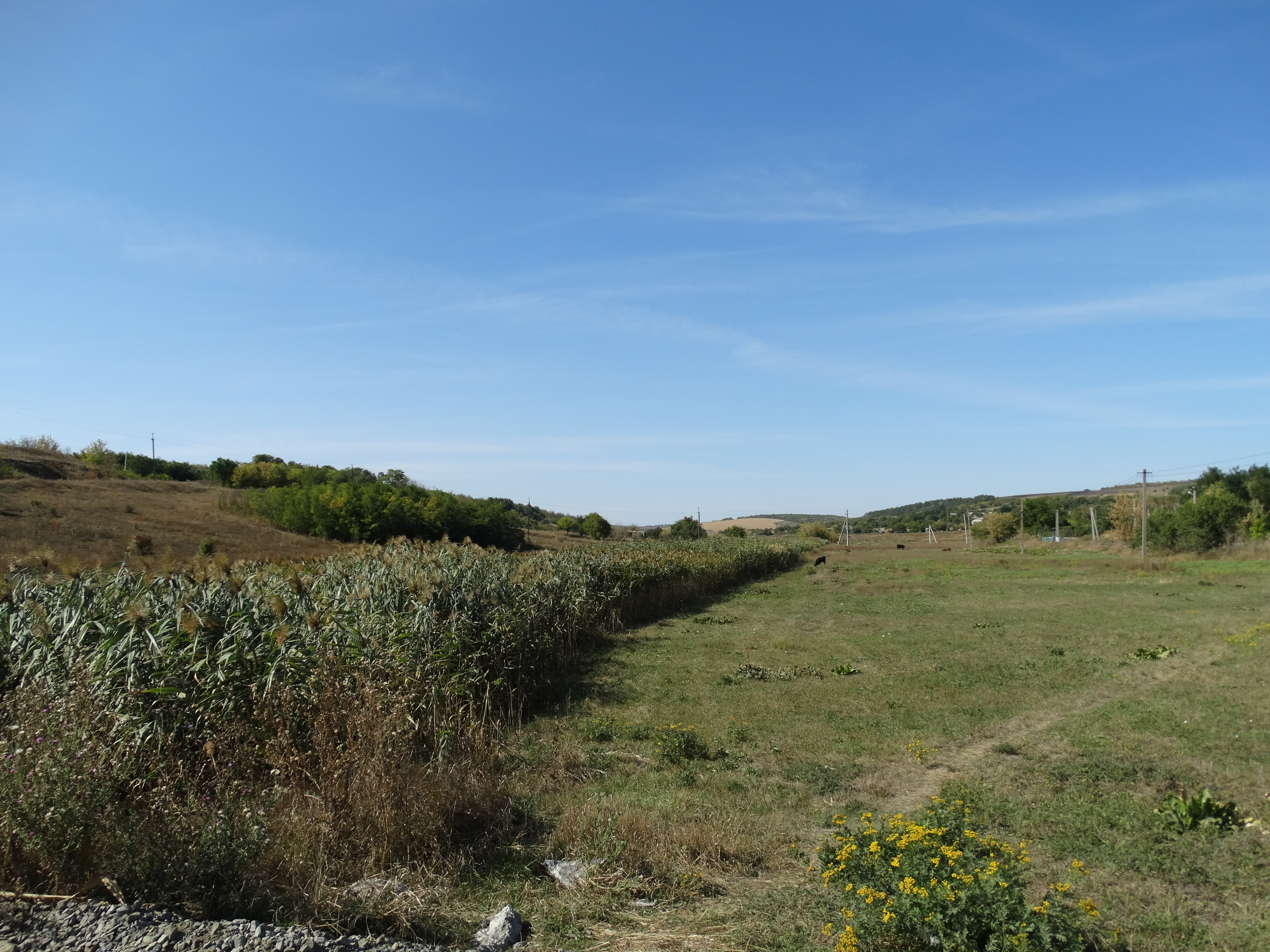
Upper course

Historically, the Velykyi Kuialnyk was navigable and, along with the Dniester, served as a route for transporting goods to the Black Sea, bypassing the cascades of the Dnieper River. However, in 2007–2008, illegal sand diggers constructed a dam at the river’s mouth, which prevented it from emptying into the sea. The dam has not been removed, resulting in the gradual drying of the estuary.
