= OBAC Odesa =

Home colours	Away colours

Odesa British Athletic Club (In Russian: «Одесский британский атлетический клуб» ОБАК in short, meaning: Odesian British Athletic Club) was an earlier Imperial Russian athletic club from Odesa, which was established on 1878 by British workers of the Indo-European Telegraph Company who in 1877 moved from Kerch to Odesa.

== History ==
The city of Odesa was the biggest city of the Imperial Russian South-West (see, Southwestern Krai) and was a municipality (Gradonachalstvo, an Imperial Russian administrative unit of the same level as governorate (gubernia) and oblast). In 1877 to the city from Kerch moved the Indo-European Telegraph Company that employed many Brits (subjects of British Crown). In 1878 they organized the Odesa British Athletic Club (OBAC) which among other sports competitions cultivated the game of association football.

They played at the field located in a neighborhood of Malofontanskaya doroga (Little-fountain Road), not far from a sea shore. For a long time OBAC was composed exclusively out of English only and beside playing between themselves, they conducted annual meetings with footballers of the Romanian city of Galați.

== Honors ==
- Odesa Football Championship: 1911, 1912,

☆2> 1913

== Statistics ==
=== Odesa Football League ===
Season	Games	Wins	Drews	Loses	Goals	Points	Standings	Trophies
1911	6	5	0	1	13–3	10	1	Cup of "Sports Journal"
1911/12	16	11	3	2	41–13	25	1	Jacobs Cup
1912/13	14	10	3	1	42–8	23	2	Bokhanov Shield
1913/14	14	7	1	6	28–23	15	4	
1914/15	16	7	2	7	16	6		
1915/16	10	3	1	6	16–20	7	4	
1916/17	10	8	3					

== Known Players ==
- Ernest Jacobs
- Hubert Townend
- Sergey Utochkin
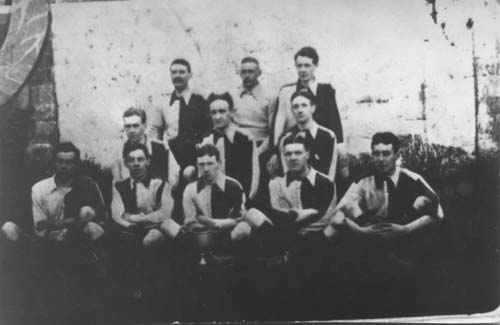
OBAC Players in 1912

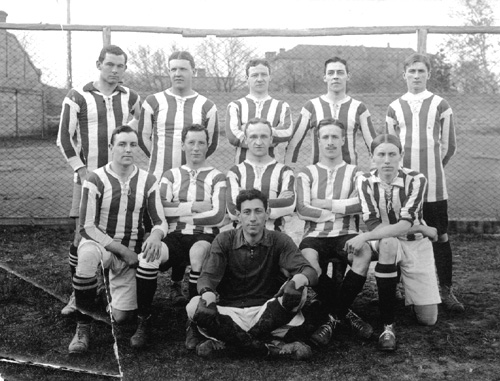
OBAC in 1914
