= Seweryn Potocki =

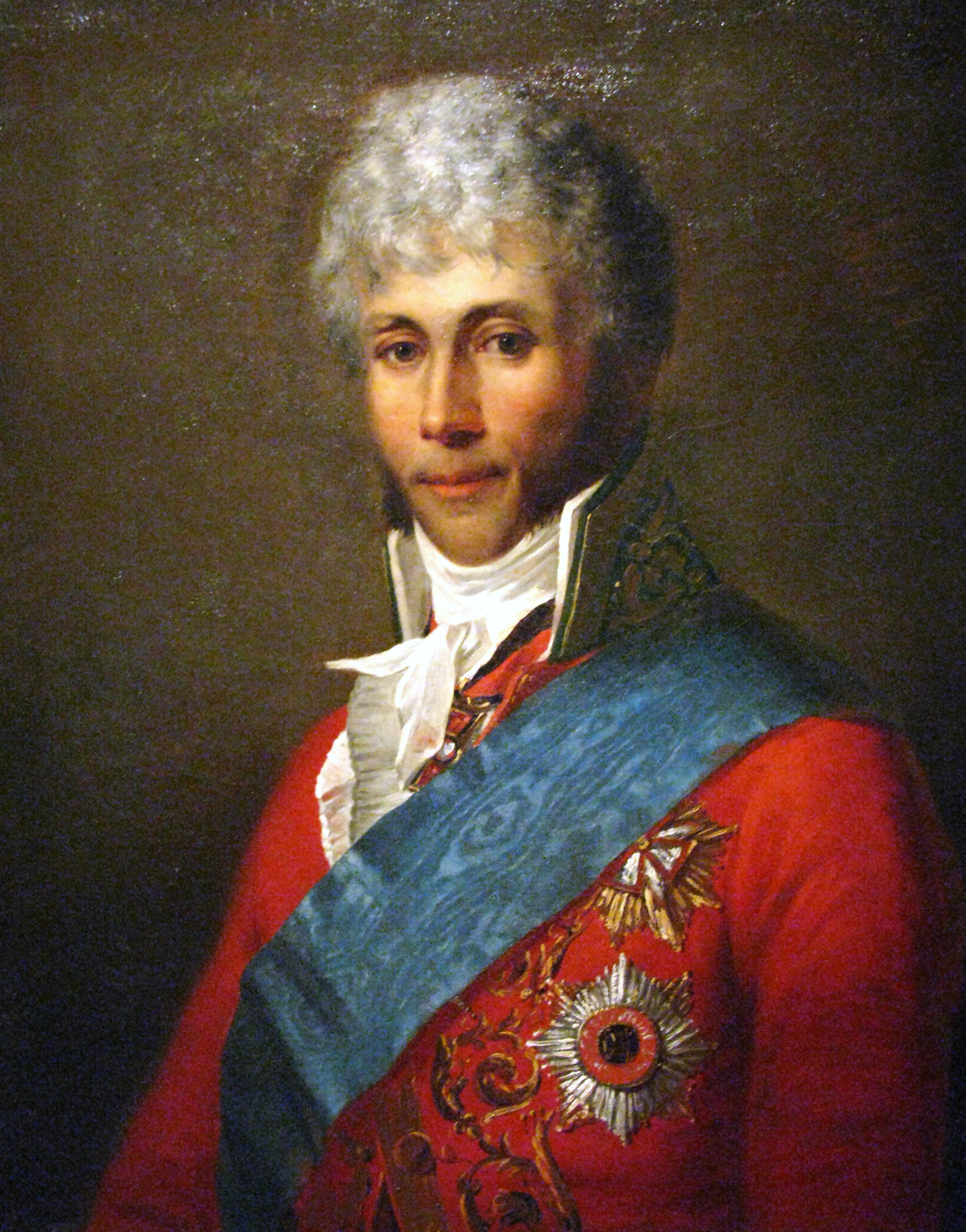
- Coat of arms: Pilawa
- Born: 1762; Kuryłówka, Ruthenian Voivodeship, Kingdom of Poland, Polish–Lithuanian Commonwealth
- Died: 16 September 1829 (aged 66–67); Moscow, Russian Empire
- Noble family: Potocki

Seweryn Potocki of the Pilawa coat of arms (born 1762 in Kuryłówka, died September 16, 1829) was a Polish envoy and senator, later privy councilor, and member of the State Council of the Russian Empire, curator of the University of Kharkiv, Freemason, and a Knight of Malta since 1811.

He was the son of Józef Potocki, Starost of Leżajsk, and Anna Teresa née Ossolińska, brother of Jan, a writer and traveler, and father of Leon, a diplomat, as well as four daughters, including Wanda, a social and charitable activist. In 1786, he married Anna Teofila Sapieżanka, the daughter of Aleksander Michał Sapieha.

He was a patriotic activist during the Great Sejm period, an envoy of the Bracław Voivodeship to the Four-Year Sejm in 1788. He did not join the Targowica Confederation. He was a member of the plenipotentiary commission in Lviv, appointed in 1790 for negotiations with Leopold II Habsburg. He was a member of the Society of Friends of the Government Constitution.

He founded the town of Sewerynówka (now Severynivka, Ukraine), and built its Catholic church.

He moved to Russia, where he conducted fruitful educational activities, as the curator of the Kharkiv University. In Odessa, he built a neoclassical palace between 1805 and 1810, which still exists today on Sofijskaya Street and has housed the Museum of Fine Arts since 1899.

In the 18th century, he was a member of the Masonic lodge Temple of Isis. He was awarded the Order of the White Eagle on July 5, 1791, and the Order of Saint Alexander Nevsky. In 1784, he became a Knight of the Order of Saint Stanislaus. He was a corresponding member of the Warsaw Society of Friends of Learning.
