= Velykyi Buialyk rural hromada =

Coordinates: 46°56′N 30°40′E

Velykyi Buialyk rural hromada Великобуялицька сільська громада
- Hromada
- Interactive map of Velykyi Buialyk rural hromada
- Country: Ukraine
- Oblast: Odesa Oblast
- Raion: Berezivka Raion
- Admin. center: Velykyi Buialyk

Area
  - Total: 166.21 km^{2} (64.17 sq mi)

Population (2019)
  - Total: 6,200
  - Density: 37/km^{2} (97/sq mi)
- CATOTTG code: UA51020110000041005
- Settlements: 3
- Rural settlements: 1
- Villages: 2
- Website: https://vbuyalycka.gromada.org.ua/

Velykyi Buialyk rural hromada (Ukrainian: Великобуялицька сільська громада) is a hromada in Berezivka Raion of Odesa Oblast in southwestern Ukraine. Population: 6,200 (as of 2019).

The hromada consists one rural settlement (Petrivka) and two villages: Velykyi Buialyk and Ulianivka:

== Links ==
- Великобуялицька сільська ОТГ // Облікова картка на офіційному вебсайті Верховної Ради України.
- https://decentralization.gov.ua/gromada/1579#
- https://gromada.info/gromada/velykobuyalycka/
