= Ivanivka, Odesa Oblast =

Rural locality in Odesa Oblast, Ukraine

Ivanivka Іванівка
- Rural settlement
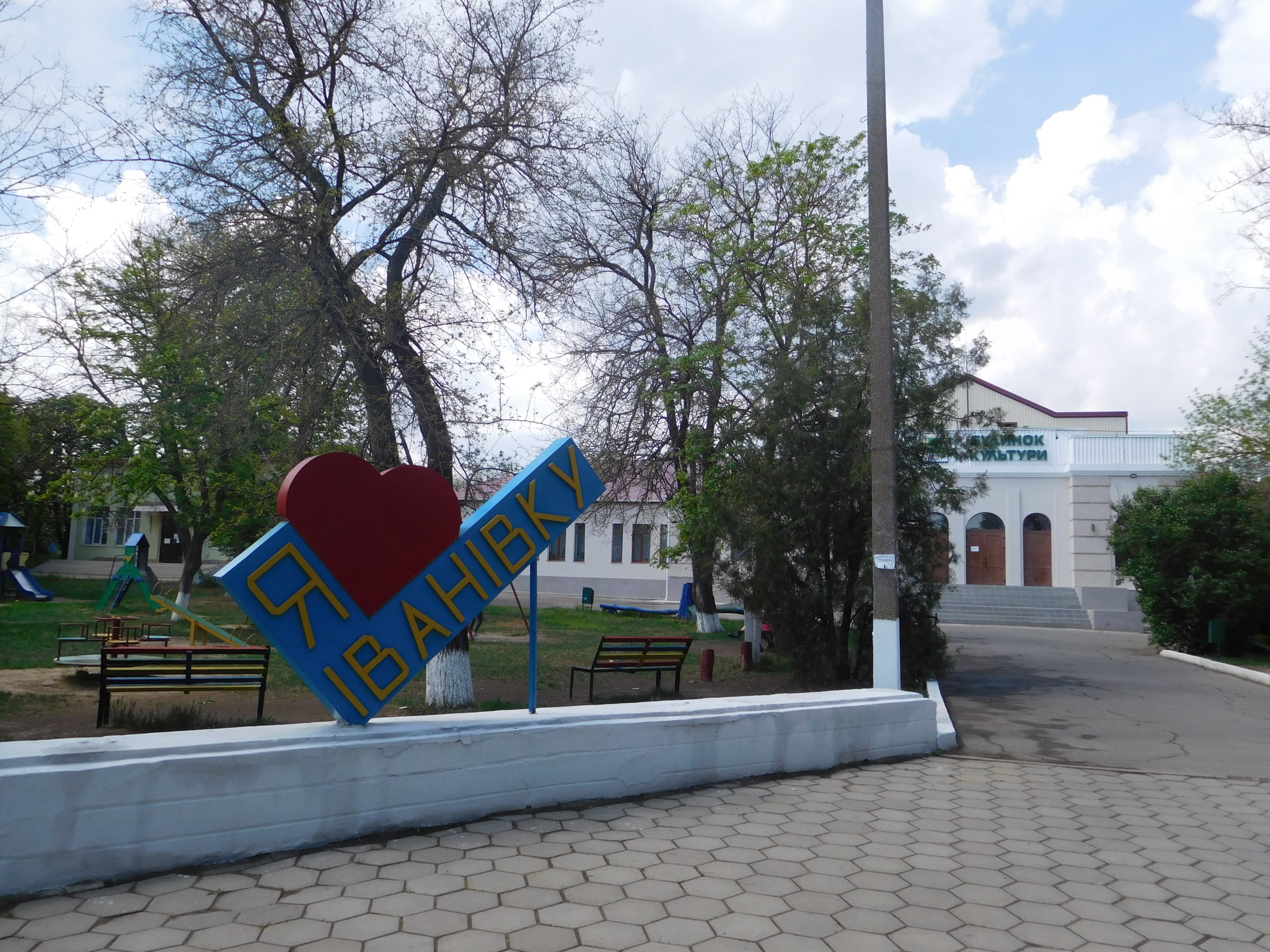
- Interactive map of Ivanivka
- Location within Odesa Oblast Location within Ukraine
- Coordinates: 46°58′32.2″N 30°28′11″E
- Country: Ukraine
- Oblast: Odesa Oblast
- Raion: Berezivka Raion
- Hromada: Ivanivka settlement hromada

Population (2022)
  - Total: 2,362
- Time zone: UTC+2 (EET)
  - Summer (DST): UTC+3 (EEST)

Ivanivka (Ukrainian: Іванівка) is a rural settlement in Berezivka Raion, in the west of Odesa Oblast, Ukraine. It hosts the administration of Ivanivka settlement hromada, one of the hromadas of Ukraine. Population: 2,362 (2022 estimate).

== Geography ==
Ivanivka is located on the right bank of the Velykyi Kuialnyk in the Black Sea Lowland.

== History ==
Ivanivka was founded in the end of the 18th century as Malaya Baranovka (Mala Baranivka), named after the landowner Baranov. The area was settled after 1792, when the lands between the Southern Bug and the Dniester were transferred to Russia according to the Iasi Peace Treaty. The area was included in Tiraspol Uyezd, which belonged to Yekaterinoslav Viceroyalty until 1795, Voznesensk Viceroyalty until 1796, Novorossiya Governorate until 1803, and Kherson Governorate until 1920. In 1825, the area was transferred to newly established Odessa Uyezd. In 1858, the settlement was renamed Yanovka (Yanivka) after another landowner, Jan Lemper.

On 16 April 1920, Odesa Governorate split off, and Odessky Uyezd was moved to Odessa Governorate. In 1923, uyezds in Ukrainian Soviet Socialist Republic were abolished, and the governorates were divided into okruhas. Yanivka was included into Odessa Okruha. On 3 July 1923 Yanivka Raion with the administrative center in Yanivka was established. In 1930, okruhas were abolished, and on 27 February 1932, Odesa Oblast was established, and Yanivka Raion was included into Odesa Oblast. In 1946, Yanivka was renamed Ivanivka, and Yanivka Raion was renamed Ivanivka Raion.

The raion was abolished in July 2020 as part of the administrative reform of Ukraine, which reduced the number of raions of Odesa Oblast to seven. The area of Ivanivka Raion was merged into Berezivka Raion.

Until 26 January 2024, Ivanivka was designated urban-type settlement. On this day, a new law entered into force which abolished this status, and Ivanivka became a rural settlement.

== Economy ==
=== Transportation ===
There is a railway line connecting Ivanivka with Myhaeve railway station, which has access to Odesa and Podilsk. There is no passenger traffic along the line.
