= Kuialnyk Estuary =

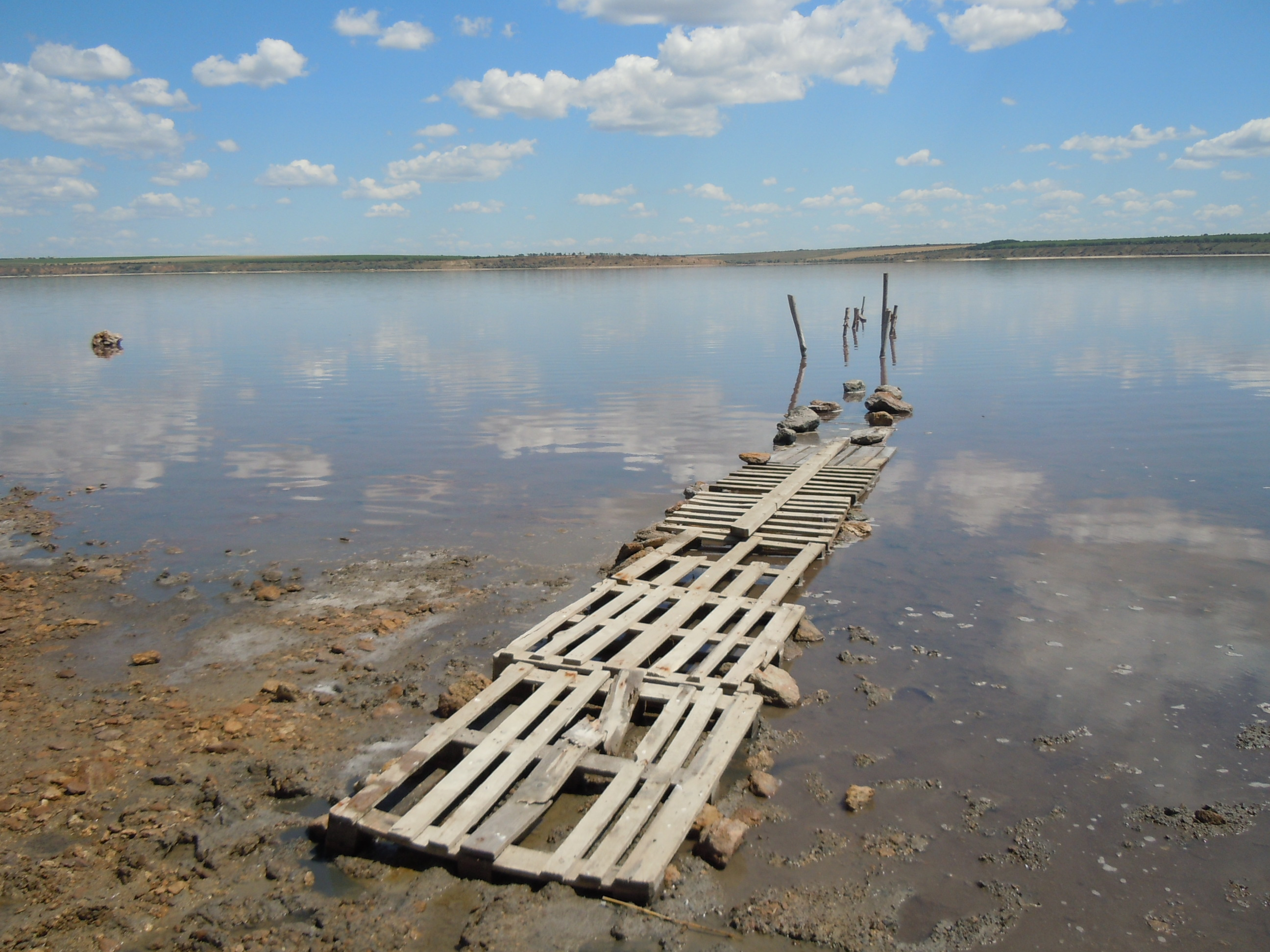
- The view of the estuary

- Location within Odesa Oblast
- Location: Ukraine
- Coordinates: 46°38′N 30°43′E
- Type: hypersaline estuary
- Primary inflows: Velykyi Kuialnyk
- Basin countries: Ukraine
- Max. length: 28 km (17 mi)
- Max. width: 3 km (1.9 mi)
- Surface area: 56–60 km^{2} (22–23 sq mi)
- Average depth: 3 m (9.8 ft)
- Settlements: Odesa

The Kuialnyk Estuary (Ukrainian: Куяльницький лиман, romanized: Kuial'nytskyi lyman; Crimean Tatar: Kuyanlık), formerly known as Andriivskyi Lyman, is an estuary of the Velykyi Kuialnyk on the northwest coast of the Black Sea, one of the group of Odesa estuaries, located north of Odesa. The name comes from Crimean Tatar kuyanlık, meaning "thick".

== General characteristics ==
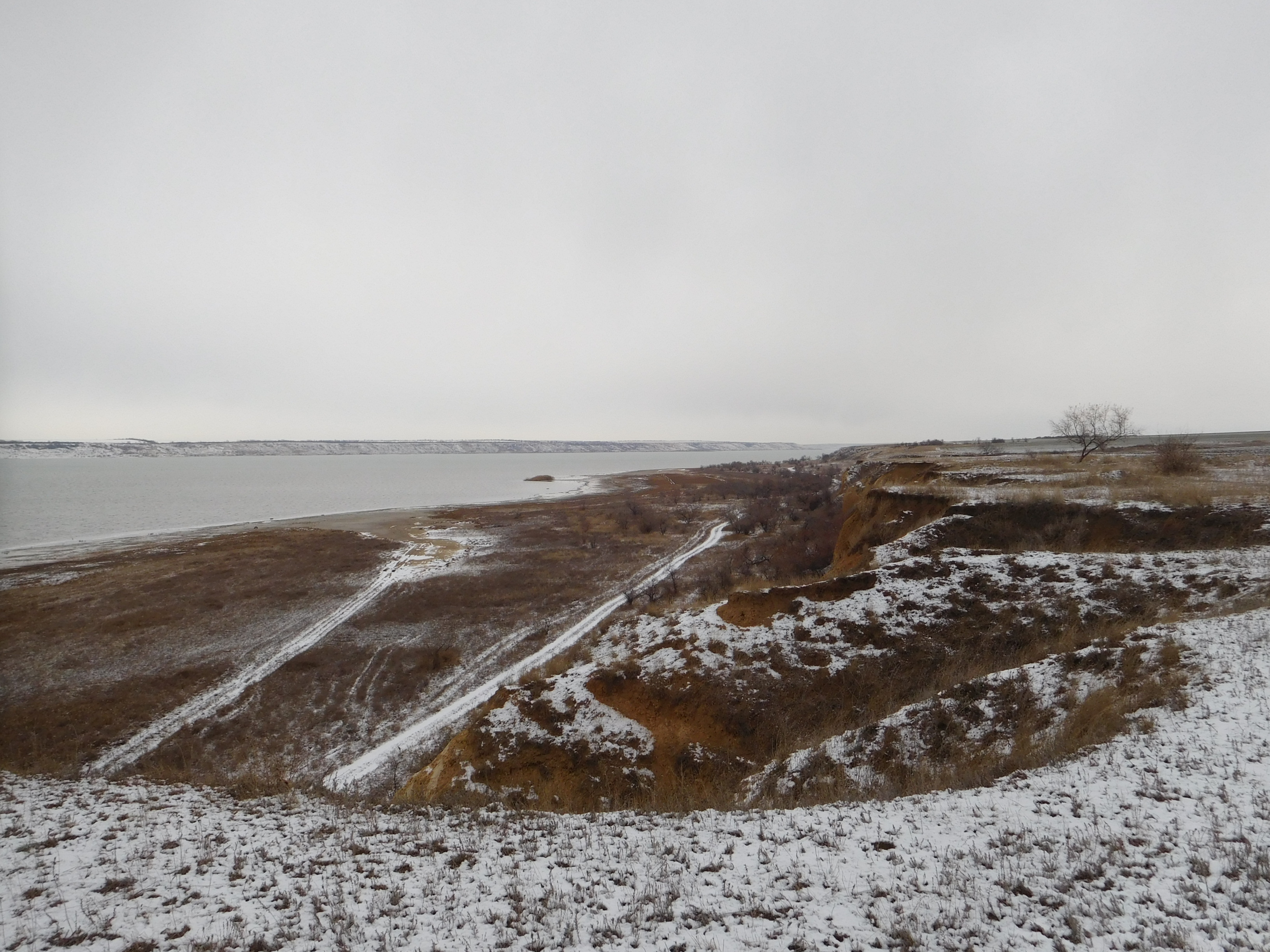

The area, depending on the water level, ranges from 52–60 km². Its length is 28 km, and its width is more than 3 km. The average depth is about 1 m. The volume is about 52 million m³. It is separated from the sea by a sandy Kuyalnytskyi-Khadzhibey peresyp sandbar up to 3 km wide. The Velykyi Kuialnik River flows into the estuary. The lowest point of Ukraine is located near the Kuialnyk estuary: 5 meters below sea level.

On the southeast coast of the estuary there is the Kuialnytskyi mud resort, on the banks of the estuary - beaches. The water temperature reaches 28-30 °C in summer.

Once in the location of Kuialnyk estuary was located the mouth of the river Velykyi Kuialnyk. Over time, the mouth turned to the gulf of the Black Sea, and then due to the deposition of river and sea sand formed an overflow, and thus the gulf turned into an estuary. Separation from the sea took place in about the fourteenth century, much later than the branch located near the Khadzhibey estuary. This can be judged at least by the fact that Kuialnyk's overflow is three times narrower than that of Khadzhibey Estuary.

The water level in the estuary and its salinity are regularly changed. Long-standing observations have shown that between 1878 and 1968 salinity in the estuary ranged from 29 to 269 ‰. During the years with high salinity, salt precipitated at the bottom of the estuary. In the dry years, when the Great Kuialnyk River dried up, the area of the reservoir decreased almost twice. Twice, in 1907 and 1925, seawater was launched to save the estuary from drying out.

== See also ==
- Dead Sea
- Mud bath
