= Ivanivka settlement hromada, Odesa Oblast =

Coordinates: 46°53′38.00″N 30°29′26.99″E

Ivanivka settlement hromada Іванівська селищна громада
- Hromada
- Interactive map of Ivanivka settlement hromada
- Country: Ukraine
- Oblast: Odesa Oblast
- Raion: Berezivka Raion
- Admin. center: Ivanivka

Area
  - Total: 438.7 km^{2} (169.4 sq mi)

Population (2020)
  - Total: 8,229
  - Density: 18.76/km^{2} (48.58/sq mi)
- CATOTTG code: UA51020090000073639
- Settlements: 19
- Rural settlements: 1
- Villages: 18

Ivanivka settlement hromada (Ukrainian: Іванівська селищна громада) is a hromada in Berezivka Raion of Odesa Oblast in southwestern Ukraine. Population: 8,229 (2020 est.)

The hromada consists of a rural settlement of Ivanivka and 18 villages:

- Adamivka
- Balanyny
- Baranove
- Bilka
- Blonske
- Buzynove
- Cherniakhivske
- Malynivka
- Maslove
- Nyzhniy Kuialnyk
- Prychepivka
- Prokhorove
- Ruska Slobidka
- Severynivka
- Shemetove
- Sukhomlynove
- Verkhniy Kuialnyk
- Zhovte

== Links ==
- Ivanivka settlement hromada, Odesa Oblast // Облікова картка на офіційному вебсайті Верховної Ради України.
- https://decentralization.gov.ua/gromada/31#
- Паспорт Одеської області 2019, с. 11
- https://www.facebook.com/100002198478102/posts/4383558055060767/
