= Sergei Utochkin =

Russian aviator (1876–1916)

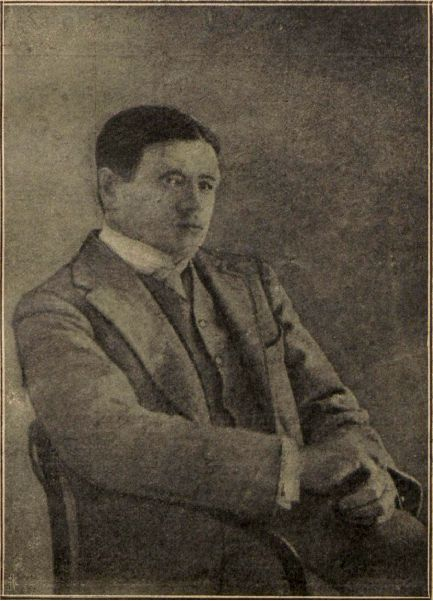
- Born: Сергей Исаевич Уточкин; 12 July 1876; Odessa, Kherson Governorate, Russian Empire
- Died: 13 January 1916 (aged 39); Saint Petersburg, Russian Empire
- Occupations: Aircraft pilot Auto racing Boxing; Association football
- Parents: Isai Kuzmich (father); Austinya Stefanovna (mother)

Sergei Utochkin (12 July 1876 – 13 January 1916) was a Russian cyclist, sportsman and aviator. He was the second Russian pilot after Mikhail Efimov. Utochkin had a nickname "the Man of all kind of sport" and "the Academician of sports" - swimming, diving, rowing and sailing, running, pistol shooting, ice skating, fencing, soccer, tennis, horse riding, wrestling, boxing. Utochkin was one of the most notable natives of the Black Sea port of Odessa in the early years of the 20th century.

== Biography ==
Sergey Utochkin was born in 1876 to the family of an Odessa merchant. His parents died early, so Utochkin and his two brothers grew up and were brought up “in people”. At one time, he lived with a gymnasium teacher, an alcoholic, who hanged himself in the attic during a binge. The wife, having discovered the dead spouse, went crazy with grief and stabbed her children with a kitchen knife. Utochkin was saved by a miracle, but retained a stutter for life.

Utochkin took off in a balloon for the first time on 1 October 1907. He flew over Odessa at an altitude of 1,400 meters. Alexander Kuprin, who, together with Sergey, overcame about 20 versts in 12 minutes, testified: “I would, without thinking for a second, fly with our pilot on his future airplane.” Kuprin described this man with these words:

“He was taller than average, stooped, long-armed, red-haired, with blue eyes and white eyelashes, all freckled. He always dressed elegantly, but, as is often the case with very muscular people, the dress on him sat a little baggy. He shaved his mustache and beard and wore a direct thorough parting, which gave his face a resemblance to the face of an English boxer, circus artist or jockey. He was ugly, but in moments of revival - in a smile - charming. Of the many people I have seen, he is the most striking figure in terms of originality and spiritual scope.”

In the spring of 1910, Baron S. Ksidias, the publisher of the Odessa paper of "Southern Thought", bought a plane. Utochkin asked permission from Ksidias, and got on an airplane that looked like a huge boxed kite. Utochkin took off and flew without any instruction and training - a rare case in the history of aviation.

== Facts ==
One of his flights to Nizhyn was enthusiastically watched by young Sergei Korolev, future general designer and creator of spacecraft.

For three years, Sergei Utochkin traveled to 600 large and small cities of the Russian Empire, where he flew an airplane in front of the public.

Utochkin was the first man who rode down the famous Potemkin Stairs by cycle and car.

In 1962, Dovzhenko Film Studios in Kiev released a film about Sergey Utochkin - “In the Dead Loop”, where the star of Soviet film actor Oleg Strizhenov starred.
