= Odesa Oblast =

Oblast (region) of Ukraine

Odesa Oblast Одеська область
- Oblast
- Odeska oblast
- Flag Coat of arms

- Interactive map of ODESA Oblast in Ukraine
- Coordinates: 47°00′N 30°00′E
- Country: Ukraine
- Administrative center: Odesa

Government
  - Governor: Oleh Kiper
  - Oblast council: 84 seats
  - Chairperson: Hrihoriy Didenko

Area
  - Total: 33,313.69 km^{2} (12,862.49 sq mi)
  - Rank: Ranked 1st

Population (2022)
  - Total: 2,351,392 ▼
  - Rank: Ranked 6th
  - Density: 70.58335/km^{2} (182.8100/sq mi)

GDP
  - Total: ₴ 272 billion (€7.0 billion)
  - Per capita: ₴ 115,129 (€3,000)
- Time zone: UTC+2 (EET)
  - Summer (DST): UTC+3 (EEST)
- Postal code: 65000-68999
- Area code: +380-48
- ISO 3166 code: UA-51
- Raions: 26
- Cities: 19
- Settlements: 33
- Villages: 1138
- HDI (2022): 0.740 high
- FIPS 10-4: UP17
- NUTS statistical regions of Ukraine: UA42
- Website: oda.od.gov.ua

Odesa Oblast (Ukrainian: Одеська область, romanized: Odeska oblast), also referred to as Odeshchyna (Одещина), is an oblast (province) of southwestern Ukraine, located along the northern coast of the Black Sea. Its administrative centre is the city of Odesa. Population: 2,351,382 (2022 estimate).

The length of coastline (sea-coast and estuaries) reaches 300 km (190 mi), while the state border stretches for 1,200 km (750 mi). The region has eight seaports and five of the biggest lakes, including Yalpuh Lake, in Ukraine. With over 80,000 ha (200,000 acres) of vineyards, it is also the largest wine-growing region in Ukraine.

== History ==
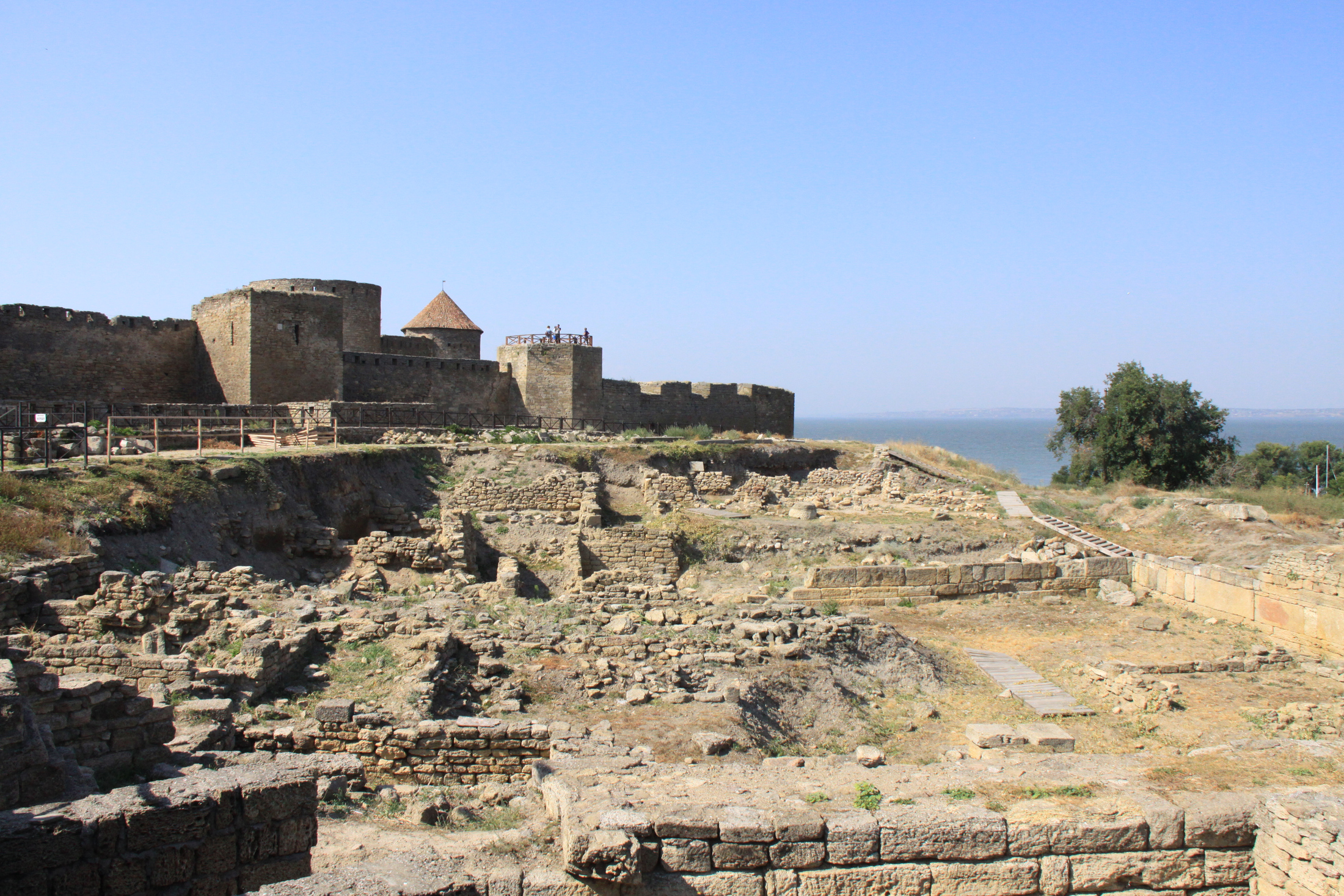
Tyras

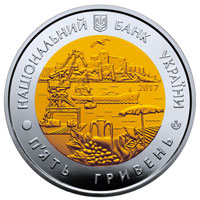
NBU commemorative coin dedicated to Odessa region

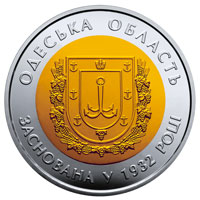
85 years of Odessa region (coin)

Evidence of the earliest inhabitants in this area comes from the settlements and burial grounds of the Neolithic Gumelnița, Cucuteni-Trypillia and Usatove cultures, as well as from the tumuli and hoards of the Bronze Age Proto-Indo-Europeans. In the 1st millennium B.C. Milesian Greeks founded colonies along the northern coast of the Black Sea, including the towns of Tyras and Niconium in the modern Odesa Oblast. The Greeks left behind painted vessels, ceramics, sculptures, inscriptions, arts and crafts that indicate the prosperity of their ancient civilisation.

The culture of Scythian tribes inhabiting the Black Sea littoral steppes in the first millennium B.C. has left artefacts in settlements and burial grounds, including weapons, bronze cauldrons, other utensils, and adornments. By the beginning of the 1st millennium A.D. the Sarmatians displaced the Scythians. In the 3rd–4th centuries A.D. a tribal alliance, represented by the items of Chernyakhov culture, developed. From the middle of the first millennium the formation of the Slavic people began. In the 9th century the eastern Slavs united into a state with Kyiv as its centre. The Khazars, Polovtsy and Pechenegs were the Slavs' neighbours during different times. Archeological evidence of the period of the 9th–14th centuries survives in materials from the settlements and cities of Kievan Rus': Belgorod, Caffa-Theodosia, and Berezan Island.

The Mongols took over the Black Sea littoral in the 13th century.

From about 1290 parts of the region were territories of the Republic of Genoa, becoming a center of Genoese commercial activity until at least the middle of the 14th century.

The Grand Duchy of Lithuania acquired part of the area at the beginning of the 15th century.

In 1593 the Ottoman Empire set up in the area what became known as its Dnieper Province (Özü Eyalet), unofficially known as the Khanate of Ukraine. The northern outskirts of the current oblast, forming part of Podolia, remained within Lithuania, and then passed to the Kingdom of Poland in 1569, within which they were located in Bracław County in the Bracław Voivodeship in the Lesser Poland Province. Savran, Kodyma and Józefgród were Polish private towns, the two latter founded by the Lubomirski family. The bulk of the territory of the Odesa Oblast passed to Russian control in 1791 in the course of the Russian southern expansion towards the Black Sea at the end of the 18th century, whereas the northern outskirts were annexed by Russia in the Second Partition of Poland in 1793. Russian historiography refers to the annexed area from 1791 as the Ochakov Oblast.

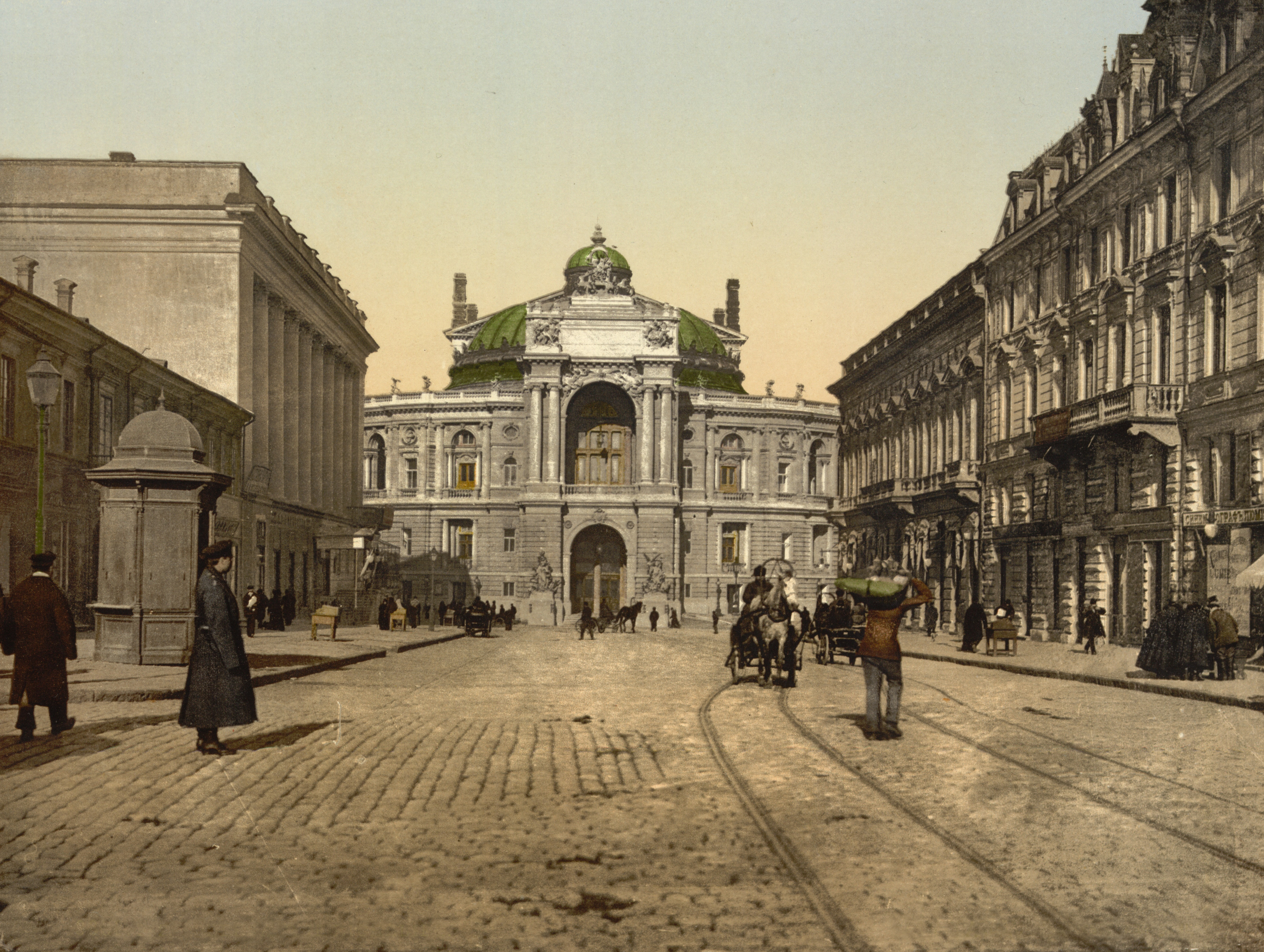
Odesa at the turn of the 19th and 20th centuries

After the February Revolution of 1917 in Russia the area became part of the Ukrainian People's Republic (1917–1918), but soon succumbed first to the Russian Volunteer Army (part of the White movement) and then to the Russian Bolshevik Red Army. By 1920 the Soviet authorities had secured the territory of Odesa Oblast, which became part of the Ukrainian SSR. The oblast was established on 27 February 1932 from five districts: Odesa Okruha, Pervomaisk Okruha, Kirovohrad Okruha, Mykolaiv Okruha, and Kherson Okruha. It was the scene of Soviet genocidal crimes, including the Holodomor of 1932–1933 and Polish Operation of the NKVD of 1937.

In 1937 the Central Executive Committee of the USSR split off the eastern portions of the Odesa Oblast to form the Mykolaiv Oblast.

=== World War II and the Holocaust ===
During World War II, the territory of the present-day Odesa Oblast was under the control of Axis powers following the German and Romanian invasion of the Soviet Union in 1941. Most of the region between the Dniester and Southern Bug rivers was placed under Romanian administration as part of the Transnistria Governorate, with Odesa serving as its capital, while the southern Budjak region, which was part of Bessarabia, was reincorporated into Romania after its initial loss in the Soviet occupation of Bessarabia and Northern Bukovina in 1940. Romanian governance lasted until the Soviet advance into the region in 1944.

The region was a major site of the Holocaust under Romanian rule. Romanian authorities established numerous ghettos, camps and other detention sites for local Jews and for Jews deported from Bessarabia and Bukovina. Ghettos within the wartime modern Odesa Oblast included those at Balta, Berezivka, Bobrik (Bobric), and other settlements, while additional camps and ghettos operated throughout Romanian-controlled Transnistria. Jews imprisoned in these sites were subjected to forced labour, starvation, exposure, disease and executions. Across the Transnistria Governorate, Romanian authorities and auxiliary forces murdered an estimated 280,000 to 380,000 Jews.

In Odesa itself, Romanian and German forces began persecuting the Jewish population immediately after the city's capture on 16 October 1941. Tens of thousands of Jews were murdered in the Odesa massacres of October 1941, including mass shootings and the burning alive of prisoners. Approximately 25,000–30,000 Jews were subsequently forced to march from Odesa to the Bogdanovka camp, where nearly all were murdered.

In January 1942, the Romanian authorities ordered the Jews who remained in Odesa into the Slobidka ghetto, which became an assembly and transit point for deportations. More than 31,000 Jews were deported from the city during January and February 1942, principally to Berezovca County in the northern part of the present-day oblast. Many died from exposure during the deportations, while thousands of others were subsequently murdered in mass shootings carried out by ethnic German Selbstschutz units and other auxiliaries. The United States Holocaust Memorial Museum estimates that these units murdered approximately 33,500 Jews deported from Odesa in Berezovca County between January and June 1942. By April 1942 only 701 registered Jews remained in Odesa, and the Slobidka ghetto was closed on 10 June. The last deportation train left the city on 23 June 1942.

The Red Army reconquered the region in 1944 and retook Odesa on 10 April. A Soviet registration conducted two months later recorded only 2,640 Jews in the city, compared with approximately 200,000 before the war.

=== Post-war ===
Odesa Oblast expanded in 1954 to absorb Izmail Oblast (also known as the Budjak region of Bessarabia), formed in 1940 as a result of the Soviet occupation of Bessarabia and Northern Bukovina (from Romania), when Northern and Southern parts of Bessarabia were given to the Ukrainian SSR. In June 1941, 3,767 people were deported, or on the list of people eligible for deportation, by the Soviet authorities from the Izmail Oblast to Siberia and Kazakhstan. Only 1,136 of those deported from the Izmail oblast were alive in Western Siberia (Tomsk region) in 1951.

During the 1991 referendum, 85.38% of votes in Odesa Oblast favored the Declaration of Independence of Ukraine. A survey conducted in December 2014 by the Kyiv International Institute of Sociology found that 2.3% of the oblast's population supported their region joining Russia, 91.5% did not support the idea, and the rest were undecided or did not respond. A poll reported by Alexei Navalny and conducted in September 2014 found similar results.

On 4–5 July 2022 during international Ukraine Recovery Conference (URC 2022) in Lugano Switzerland pledged to support the rebuilding of Odesa region.

An earthquake occurred in the Odessa region on 11 May 2025.

== Geography ==
Ukraine's largest oblast by area, the Odesa Oblast occupies an area of around 33,314 square kilometres (12,863 sq mi). It is characterised by largely flat steppes – part of the Black Sea Lowland – divided by the estuary of the Dniester river, and bordered to the south by the Danube. Its Black Sea coast has numerous sandy beaches, estuaries and lagoons. The region's soils (especially chernozems) have a reputation for fertility, and intensive agriculture is the mainstay of the local rural economy. The southwest has many orchards and vineyards, while arable crops grow throughout the region.

The oblast is located in the historic regions of Yedisan (central and eastern parts), Budjak (south-western part) and Podolia (northern outskirts).

== Points of interest ==
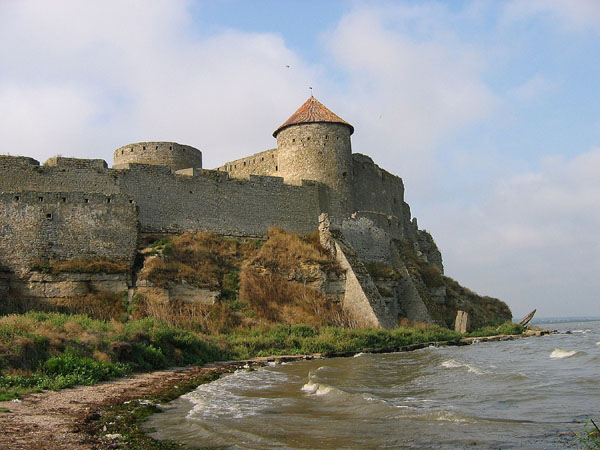
Akkerman fortress

- Historic Centre of Odesa, UNESCO World Heritage Site
- Odesa Opera
- Akkerman fortress
- Potemkin Stairs

== Economy ==
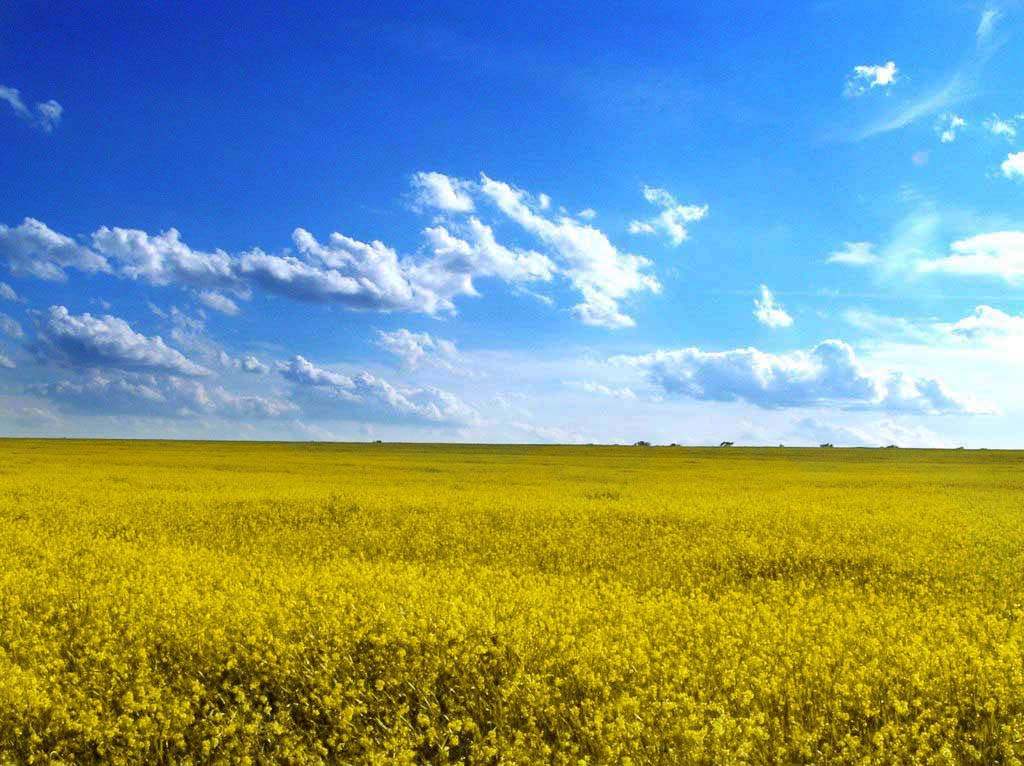
Rapeseed field in Odesa Oblast

Significant branches of the oblast's economy are:

- oil refining and chemicals processing;
- transportation (important sea and river ports, oil pipelines and railway);
- viticulture and other forms of agriculture, notably the growing of wheat, maize, barley, sunflowers and sugar beets.

The region's industrial capability is principally concentrated in and around Odesa.

== Demographics ==
The oblast's population (as at the start of 2021) was 2,368,107 people, nearly 43% of whom lived in the city of Odesa.

=== Ethnic groups ===
According to the Ukrainian national census in 2001, ethnic Ukrainians are by far the largest ethnic group, accounting for 62.8% of the population. They are the dominant ethnic group in the northern, central and southeastern part of the province, as well as in the regional capital of Odesa. Making up 20.7% of the population, Russians are the second-largest group in the region and are mostly concentrated in urban areas, yet they only constitute a relative majority in the southern port city of Izmail. Significant Bulgarian (6.1%) and Moldovan (5.0%) minorities reside in the province, who mostly live in the southeastern part of the region. It has the highest proportion of Jews of any oblast in Ukraine (although smaller than the Autonomous City of Kyiv) and there is a small Greek community in the city of Odesa.

2001 census
	percent
Ukrainians	62.8%
Russians	20.7%
Bulgarians	6.1%
Moldovans (Note: Often described as Romanian subethnicity)	5.0%
Gagauz	1.1%
Belarusians	0.5%
Ashkenazi Jews	0.5%
Armenians	0.3%

Bulgarians and Moldovans represent 21% and 13% respectively, of the population in the salient of Budjak, within Odesa Oblast.

=== Fertility rate ===
Year	Fertility	Births
1990	1.8	33166
1991	1.7	32119
1992	1.6	30155
1993	1.5	28185
1994	1.4	26197
1995	1.4	24993
1996	1.3	23666
1997	1.2	22491
1998	1.2	21273
1999	1.1	19969
2000	1.1	20042
2001	1.1	20423
2002	1.2	21227
2003	1.2	22326
2004	1.3	23343
2005	1.3	23915
2006	1.4	25113
2007	1.5	26759
2008	1.6	28780
2009	1.6	28986
2010	1.6	28690
2011	1.6	29225
2012	1.7	3384

=== Language ===
Native language in Odesa Oblast (2022)
1. Ukrainian (57.8%)
2. Russian (28.8%)
3. Other (5.40%)
4. Undecided (7.90%)

According to the 2001 Ukrainian census, Ukrainian was the mother tongue of 46.3% of the population, 42.0% for Russian, 4.9% for Bulgarian, and 3.8% Romanian.

According to a sociological survey conducted by the Ilko Kucheriv Democratic Initiatives Foundation from 21 to 27 October 2022, 57.8% of respondents in Odesa Oblast named Ukrainian as their native language, 28.8% Russian, 5.4% another language, 7.9% said they found it difficult to say which language they considered their native language or refused to answer.

According to a sociological survey conducted by the Ilko Kucheriv Democratic Initiatives Foundation from 10 to 21 July 2023 in Odesa Oblast, the share of respondents who speak Ukrainian at home has increased to 42% (from 26% in 2021), while the share of those who speak Russian at home has dropped to 54%. To the question "How do you feel about the mandatory use of Ukrainian in the service sector (shops, cafes, barber shops, entertainment venues)?" 59% answered "Positive", 13% "Negative", 17% "I don't care", 12% "Hard to say". To the question "Do you think it is acceptable to perform songs in Russian in the public space of your village/city, for example, performances by street musicians, listening to such songs in cafes/restaurants or supermarkets, etc.?" 30% answered "No", 37% "Yes", 20% "I don't care", 12% "I find it difficult to answer".

=== Age structure ===
Population by age (2013 official)
Age range	Percentage	Male	Female
0–14	15.5% ▲	188,937	179,536
15–64	70.7% ▼	812,411	867,706
65+	14.0% ▼	116,702	218,808

=== Median age ===
2013 official figures:

- total: 38.4 years
- male: 35.4 years
- female: 41.5 years ▲

=== Religion ===
Religion in Odesa Oblast (2015)
1. Eastern Orthodoxy (84.0%)
2. No religion (8.00%)
3. Unaffiliated Christian (6.00%)
4. Catholicism (0.50%)
5. Protestantism (0.50%)
6. Undecided (1.00%)

The dominant religion in Odesa Oblast is Eastern Orthodox Christianity, professed by 84% of the population. Another 8% declares to be non-religious and 6% are unaffiliated generic Christians. Adherents of Catholicism and Protestantism make up 0.5% of the population respectively.

The Orthodox community of Odesa Oblast is divided as follows:

- Non-denominational – 46%
- Ukrainian Orthodox Church (Moscow Patriarchate) – 31%
- Ukrainian Orthodox Church – Kyiv Patriarchate – 21%
- Ukrainian Autocephalous Orthodox Church – 1%
- Unknown – 1%

The Kyiv Patriarchate and the Ukrainian Autocephalous Orthodox Church merged into the Orthodox Church of Ukraine in 2019, while the Moscow Patriarchate was banned by law in 2024.

== Administrative divisions ==
Until 2020, the Odesa Oblast was administratively subdivided into 26 raions (districts) and 7 municipalities which were directly subordinate to the oblast government – (Bilhorod-Dnistrovskyi, Chornomorsk, Izmail, Pivdenne, Podilsk, Teplodar and the administrative centre of the oblast, Odesa).

Name	Ukrainian name	Area (km^{2})	Population 2015	Admin. centre	Urban Population Only*
Odesa	Одеса (місто)	139	1,010,490	Odesa (city)	1,010,490
Bilhorod-Dnistrovskyi ^	Білгород-Дністровський (місто)	31	57,559	Bilhorod-Dnistrovskyi (city)	57,559
Chornomorsk	Чорноморськ (місто)	25	72,553	Chornomorsk (city)	67,323
Izmail ^	Ізмаїл (місто)	53	72,266	Izmail (city)	72,266
Podilsk	Подільськ (місто)	25	40,613	Podilsk (city)	40,613
Teplodar	Теплодар (місто)	3	10,277	Teplodar (city)	10,277
Pivdenne	Південне (місто)	9	32,149	Pivdenne (city)	32,149
Ananiv Raion	Ананьївський (район)	1,050	26,999	Ananiv	8,441
Artsyz Raion ^	Арцизький (район)	1,379	45,274	Artsyz	14,886
Balta Raion	Балтський (район)	1,317	41,666	Balta	18,940
Berezivka Raion	Березівський (район)	1,637	33,930	Berezivka	12,614
Bilhorod-Dnistrovskyi Raion ^	Білгород-Дністровський (район)	1,852	60,774	Bilhorod-Dnistrovskyi (city)	N/A *
Biliaivka Raion	Біляївський (район)	1,497	94,083	Biliaivka	14,334
Bolhrad Raion ^	Болградський (район)	1,364	69,148	Bolhrad	15,451
Ivanivka Raion	Іванівський (район)	1,162	26,604	Ivanivka	8,807
Izmail Raion ^	Ізмаїльський (район)	1,194	51,584	Izmail (city)	N/A *
Kiliia Raion ^	Кілійський (район)	1,358	52,400	Kiliia	28,434
Kodyma Raion	Кодимський (район)	818	29,586	Kodyma	11,195
Lyman Raion	Комінтернівський (район)	1,499	71,158	Dobroslav	14,028
Liubashivka Raion	Любашівський (район)	1,100	30,688	Liubashivka	10,954
Mykolaivka Raion	Миколаївський (район)	1,093	16,127	Mykolaivka	2,850
Ovidiopol Raion	Овідіопольський (район)	829	78,941	Ovidiopol	32,486
Okny Raion	Окнянський (район)	1,013	20,186	Okny	5,338
Podilsk Raion	Подільський (район)	1,037	27,091	Podilsk (city)	N/A *
Reni Raion ^	Ренійський (район)	861	58,352	Reni	25,527
Rozdilna Raion	Роздільнянський (район)	1,368	37,353	Rozdilna	19,003
Sarata Raion ^	Саратський (район)	1,474	45,057	Sarata	4,351
Savran Raion	Савранський (район)	617	19,083	Savran	6,420
Shyriaieve Raion	Ширяївський (район)	1,502	27,151	Shyriaieve	6,781
Tarutyne Raion ^	Тарутинський (район)	1,874	41,603	Tarutyne	12,932
Tatarbunary Raion ^	Татарбунарський (район)	1,748	38,825	Tatarbunary	10,988
Velyka Mykhailivka Raion	Великомихайлівський (район)	1,436	31,006	Velyka Mykhailivka	8,472
Zakharivka Raion	Захарівський (район)	956	20,233	Zakharivka	8,881

- Note: A caret (^) indicates the two municipalities and nine raions which previously constituted Izmail Oblast until that former oblast's merger with Odesa Oblast on 15 February 1954; these areas lie to the west of the Dniester River, and formerly constituted the territory known as the Budjak (southern Bessarabia). In the 18 July 2020 reorganisation, these nine raions were reduced to three, which also incorporated the two former independent cities.
- Note: Asterisks (*) Though the administrative center of the raion is housed in the city/town that it is named after, cities do not answer to the raion authorities only towns do; instead they are directly subordinated to the oblast government and therefore are not counted as part of raion statistics.

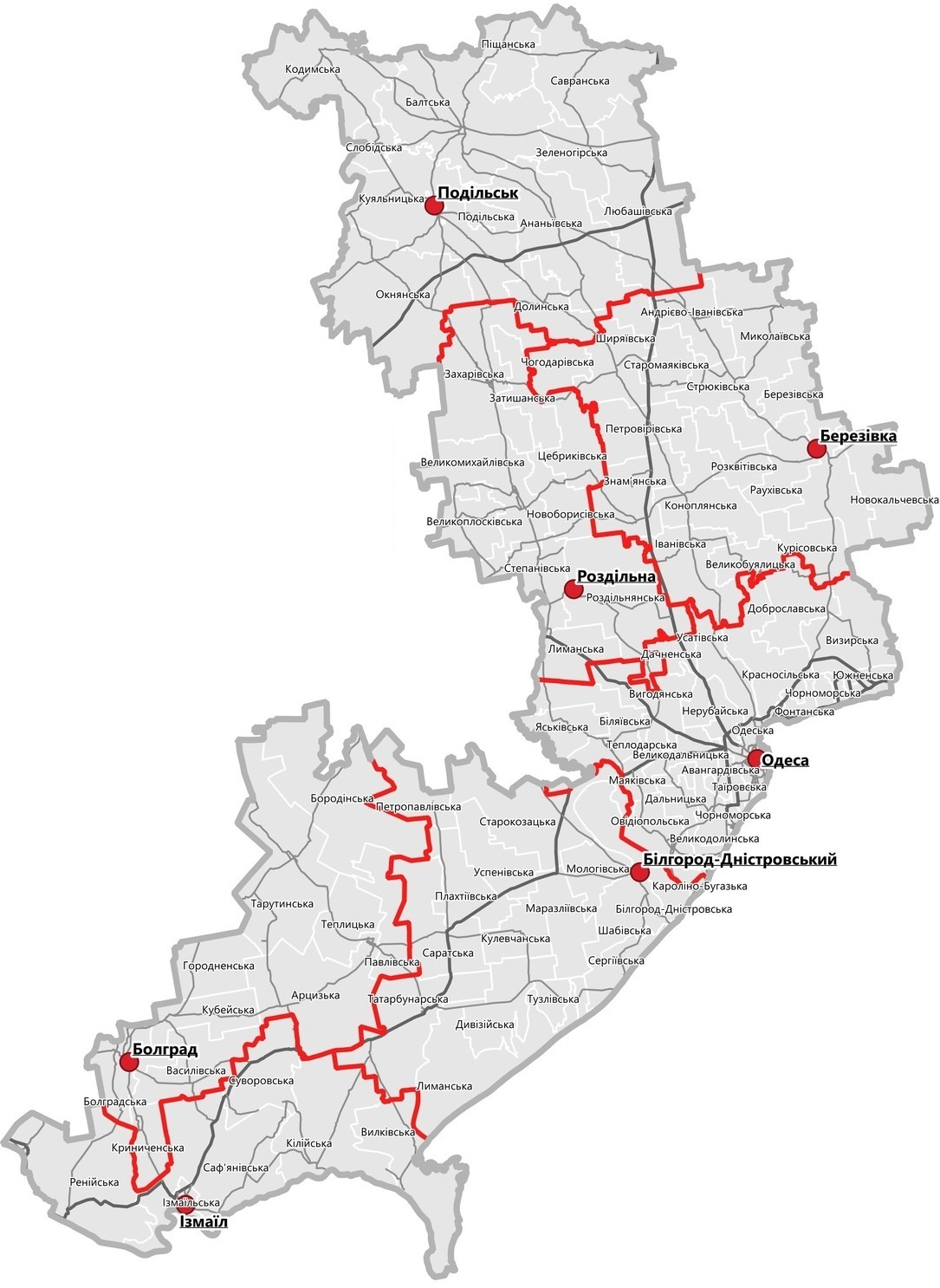
Detailed map of Odesa Oblast

On 18 July 2020, the number of districts (raions) was reduced to seven, now also incorporating the formerly independent cities. (see map). They are now divided into 91 municipalities (hromadas).

Name	Ukrainian name	Area (km^{2})	Population 2001 Census	Admin. centre	Population 2021 Estimate	Number of hromadas
Berezivka Raion	Березівський (район)	5,546	121,518	Berezivka	106,490	16
Bilhorod-Dnistrovskyi Raion	Білгород-Дністровський (район)	5,177	214,211	Bilhorod-Dnistrovskyi	198,682	16
Bolhrad Raion	Болградський (район)	4,477	167,464	Bolhrad	146,424	10
Izmail Raion	Ізмаїльський (район)	3,505	239,096	Izmail	207,333	6
Odesa Raion	Одеський (район)	3,946	1,353,314	Odesa	1,382,541	22
Podilsk Raion	Подільський (район)	7,048	266,948	Podilsk	224,163	12
Rozdilna Raion	Роздільнянський (район)	3,568	106,506	Rozdilna	102,584	9

== Notable people ==
One of the most famous Odesits is Sergei Utochkin who was a sportsman excelling in cycling, boxing, swimming and played football for the Odesa British Athletic Club. Utochkin had challenged a steam-powered tram while running, on a bicycle he beat a galloping horse, while on roller skates he was passing a bicyclist. The next stage for him was to conquer skies. Utochkin bought an airplane from a local banker and completed dozens of exhibition flights. Eventually, he managed to assemble his own Farman-type airplane. In Kyiv, Utochkin was demonstrating his piloting skills in front of some 50,000 people, among which was a future creator of helicopters Igor Sikorsky.

A number of other notable people were born in Odesa, including the poet Anna Akhmatova, former NASA scientist Nicholas E. Golovin who worked with the Apollo program, composer Tamara Maliukova Sidorenko, and the founder of jazz in the Soviet Union Leonid Utyosov.

== Gallery ==
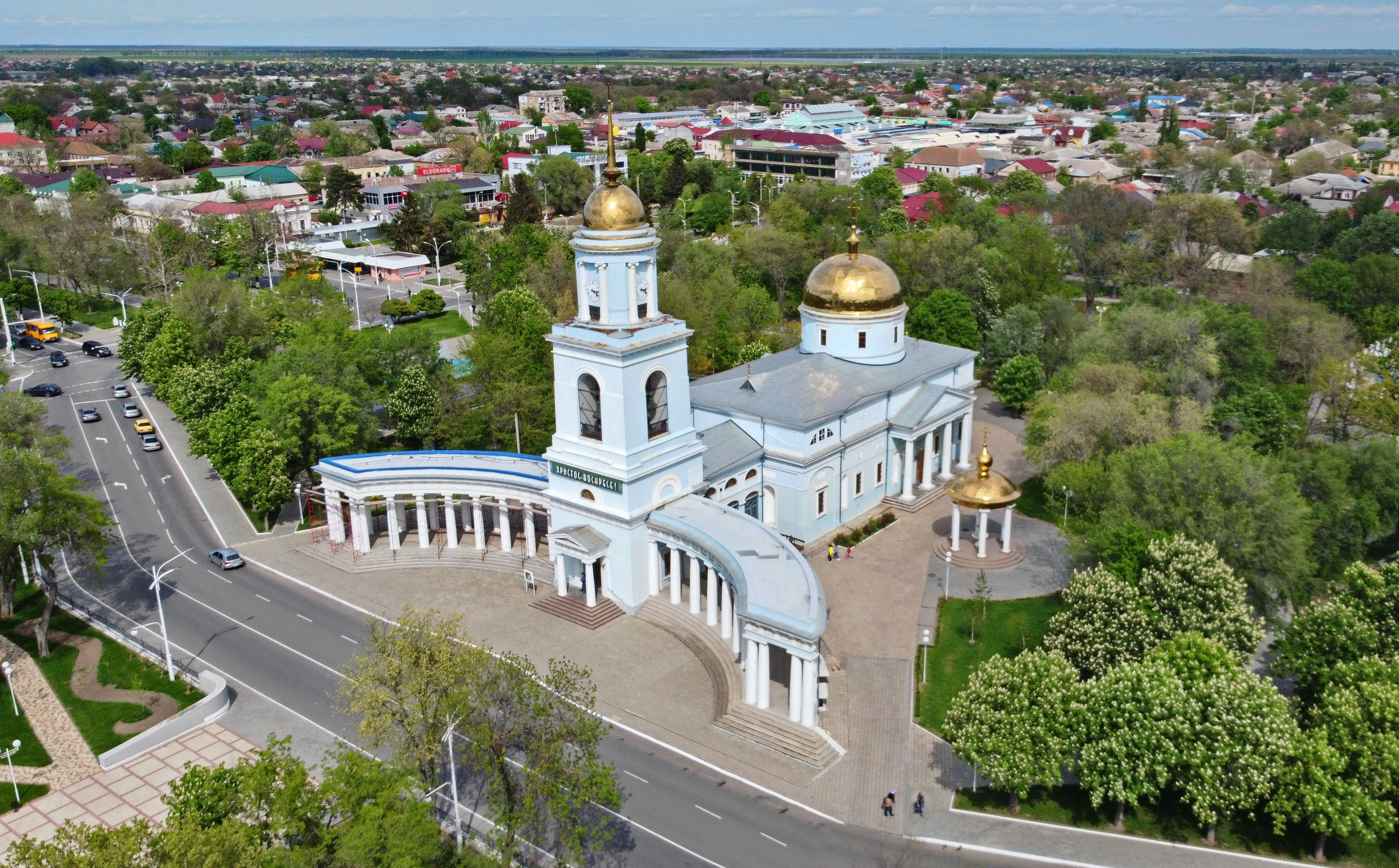
Intercession Cathedral, Izmail

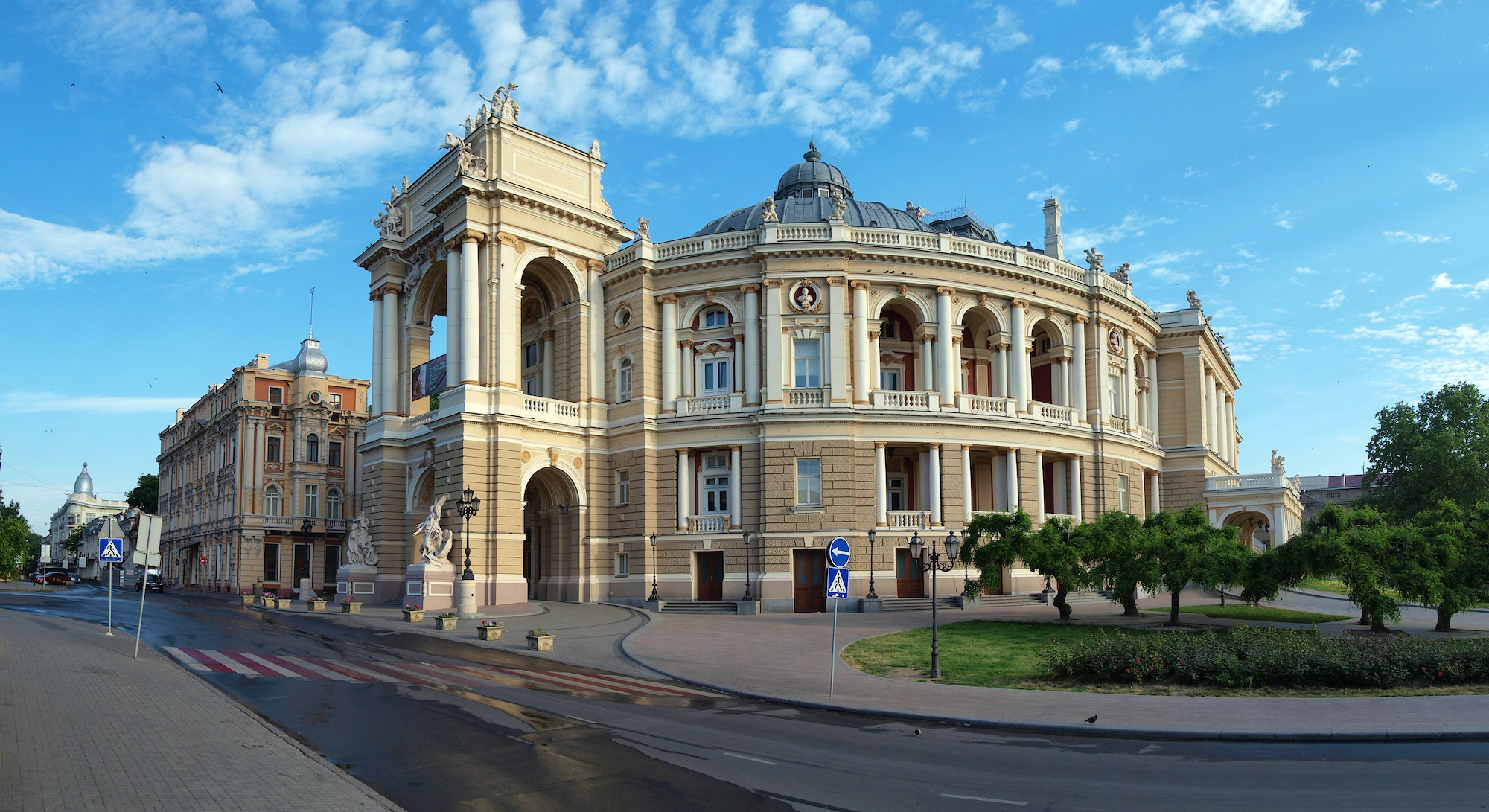
Odesa Opera House

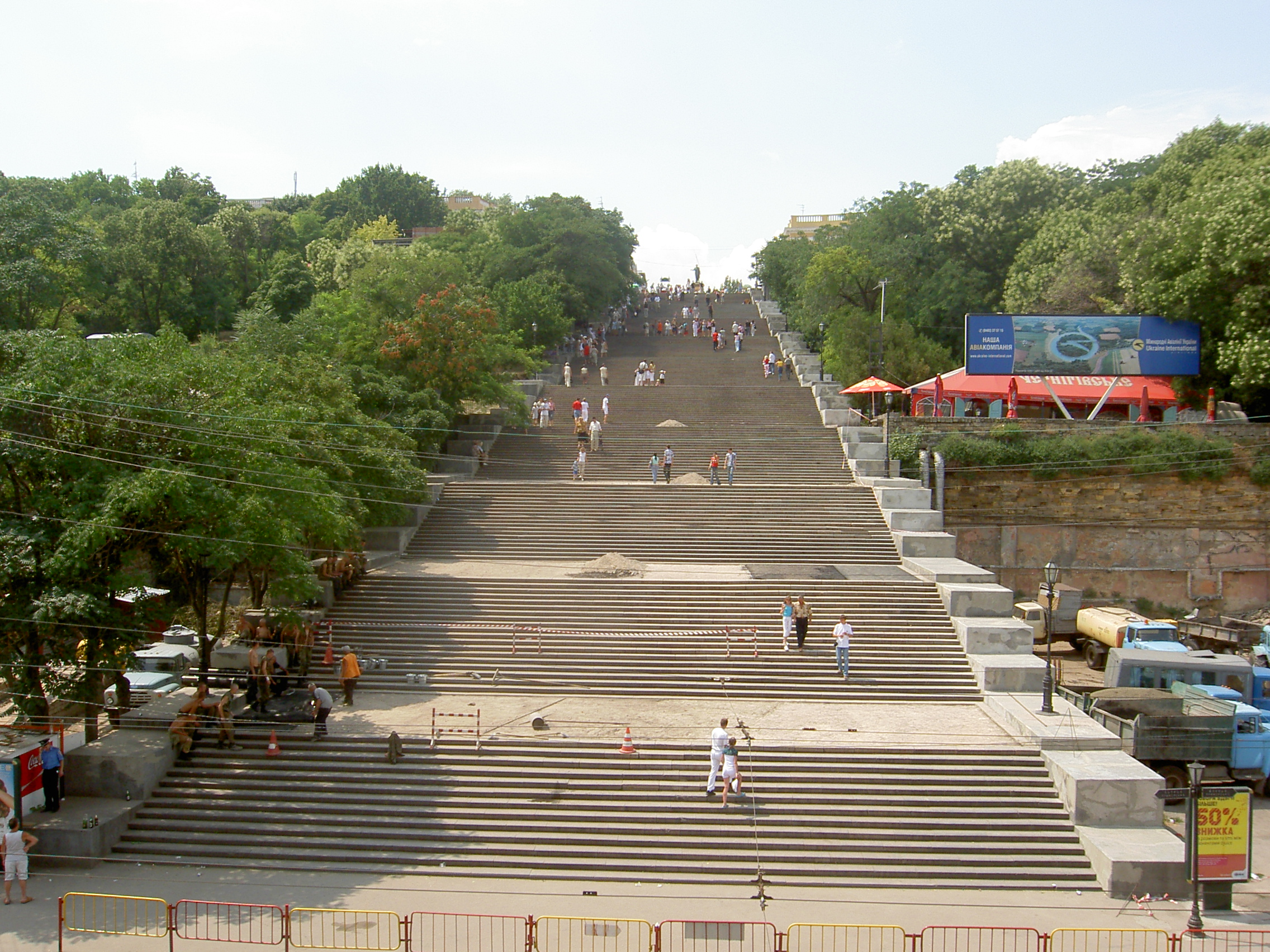
Potemkin Stairs, Odesa

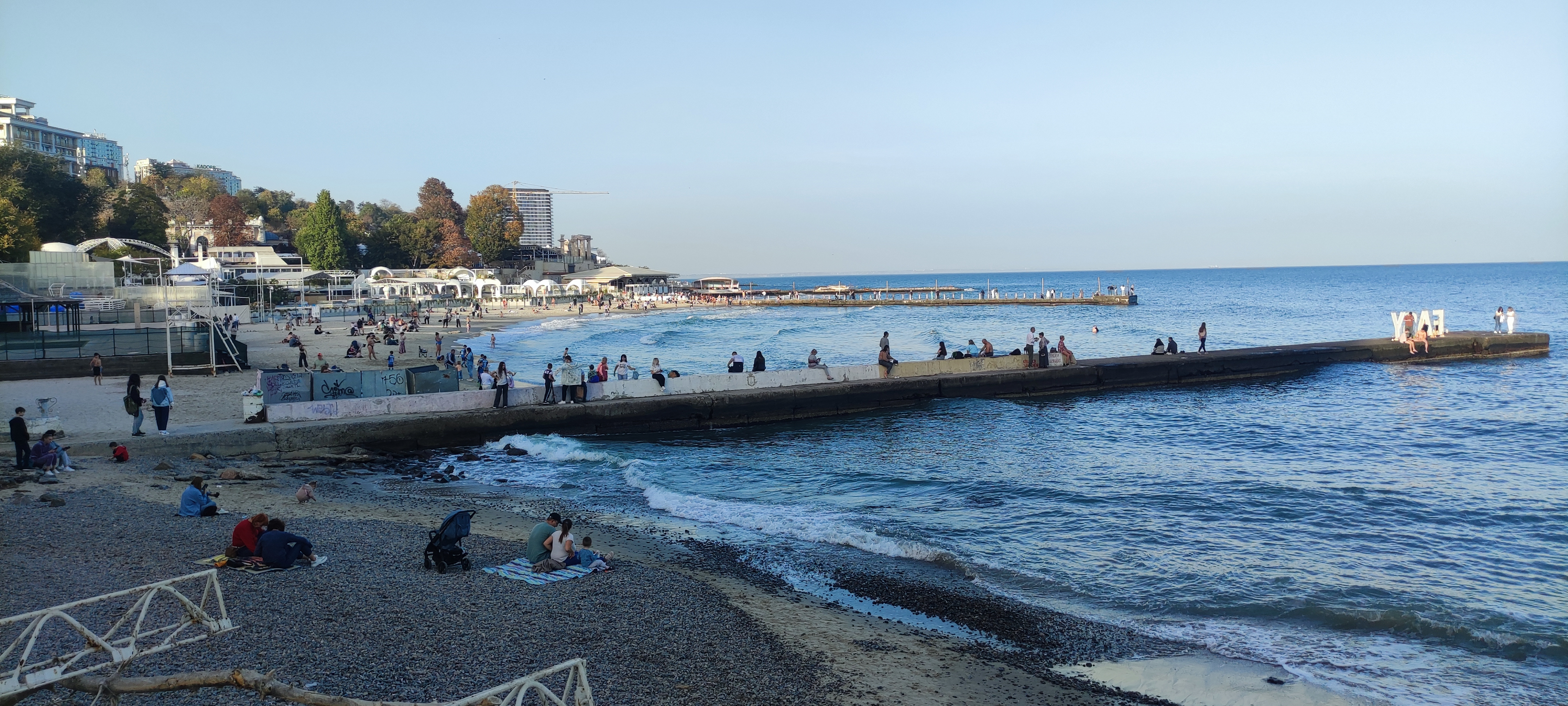
Arcadia Beach

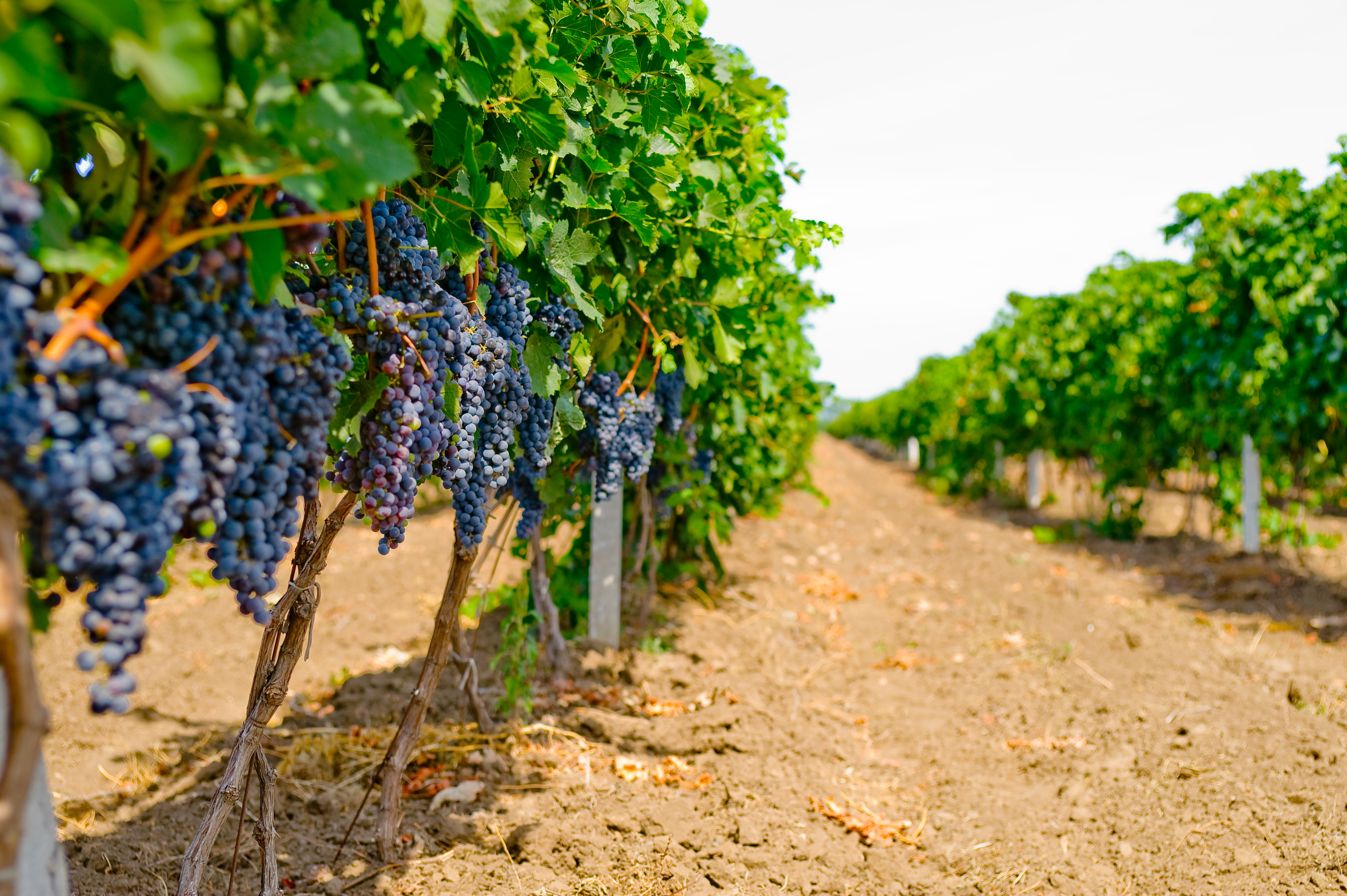
Vineyard in Shabo

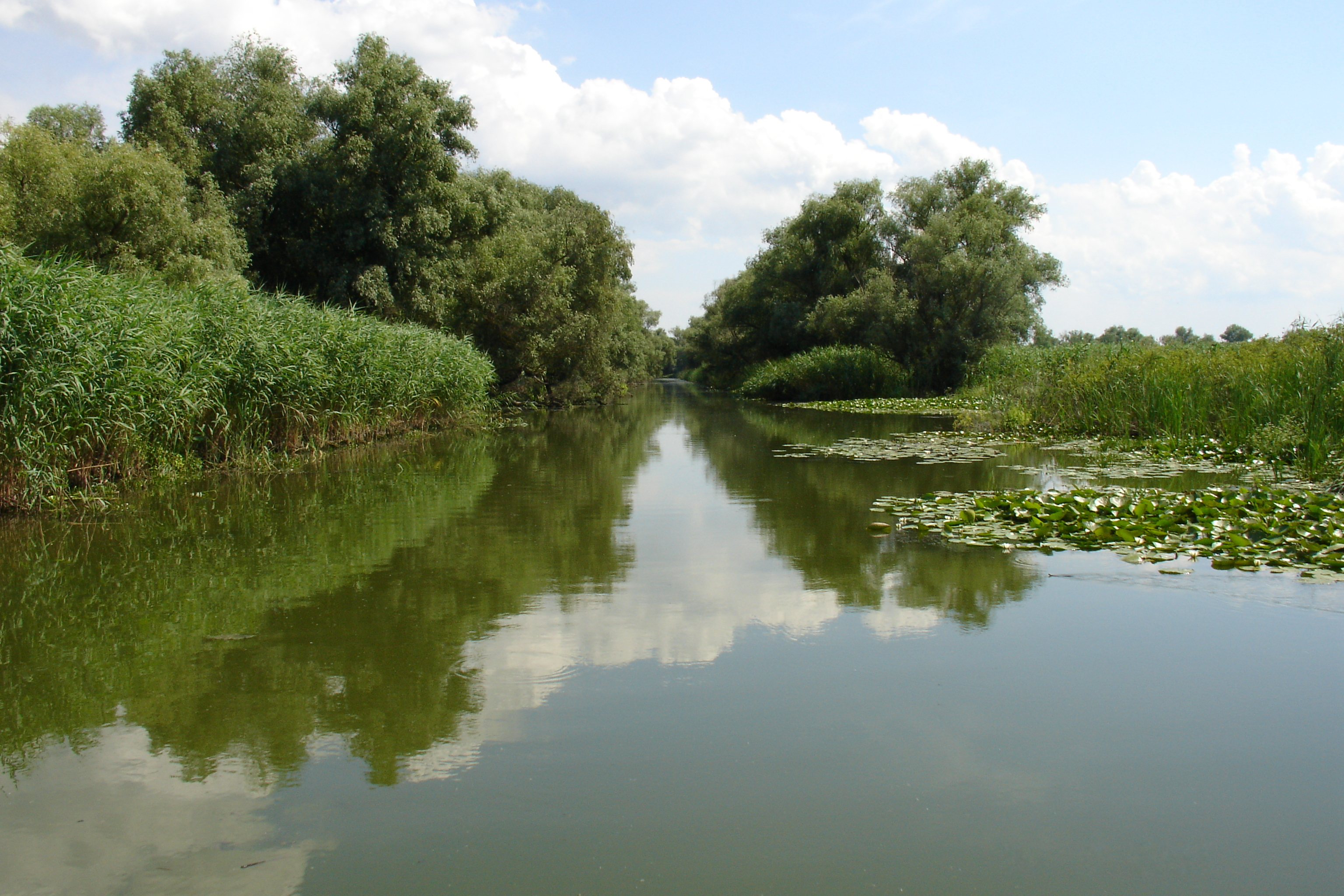
Danube Biosphere Reserve

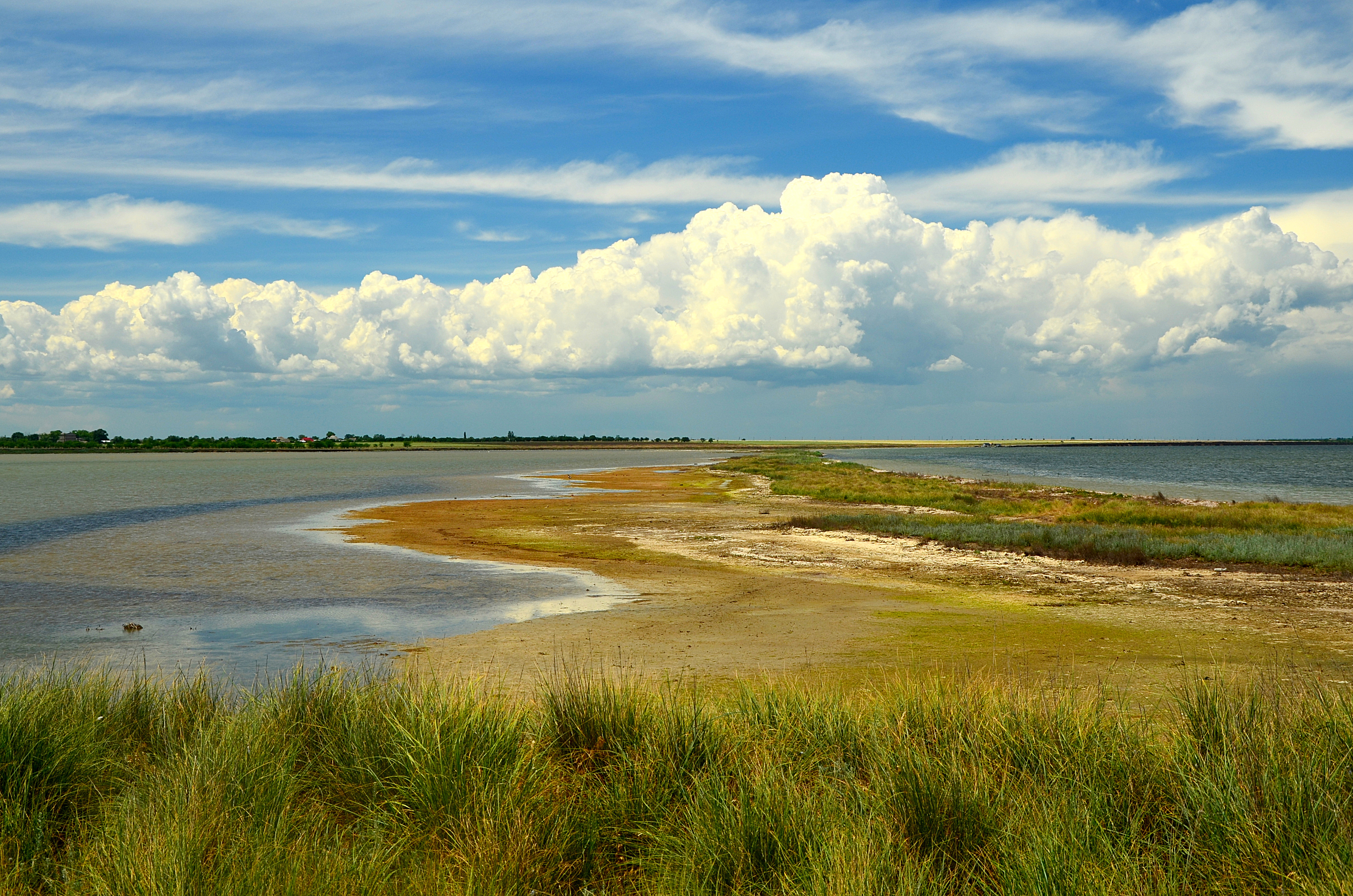
Shahany Lagoon

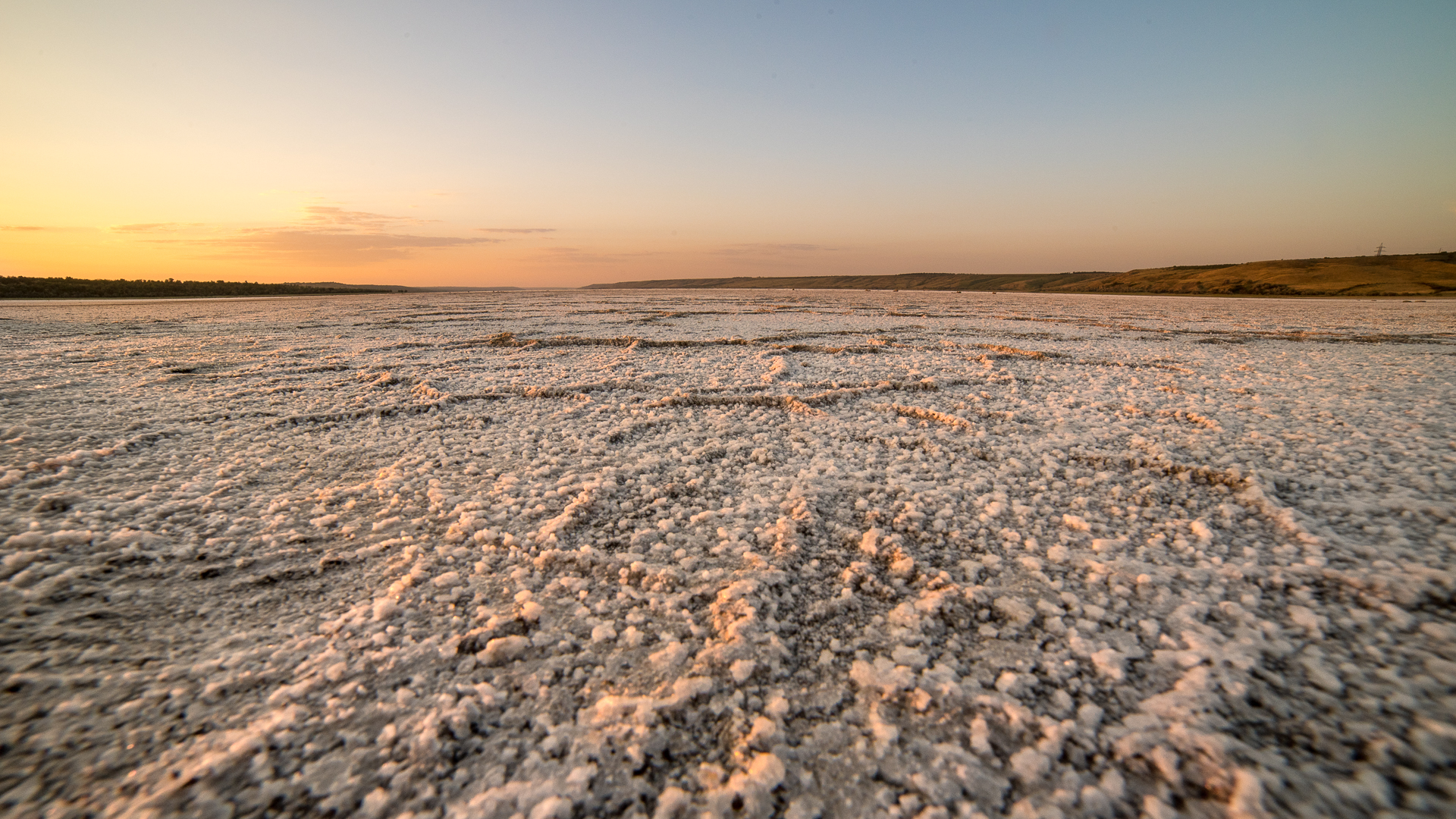
Dried out part of the Kuialnyk Estuary

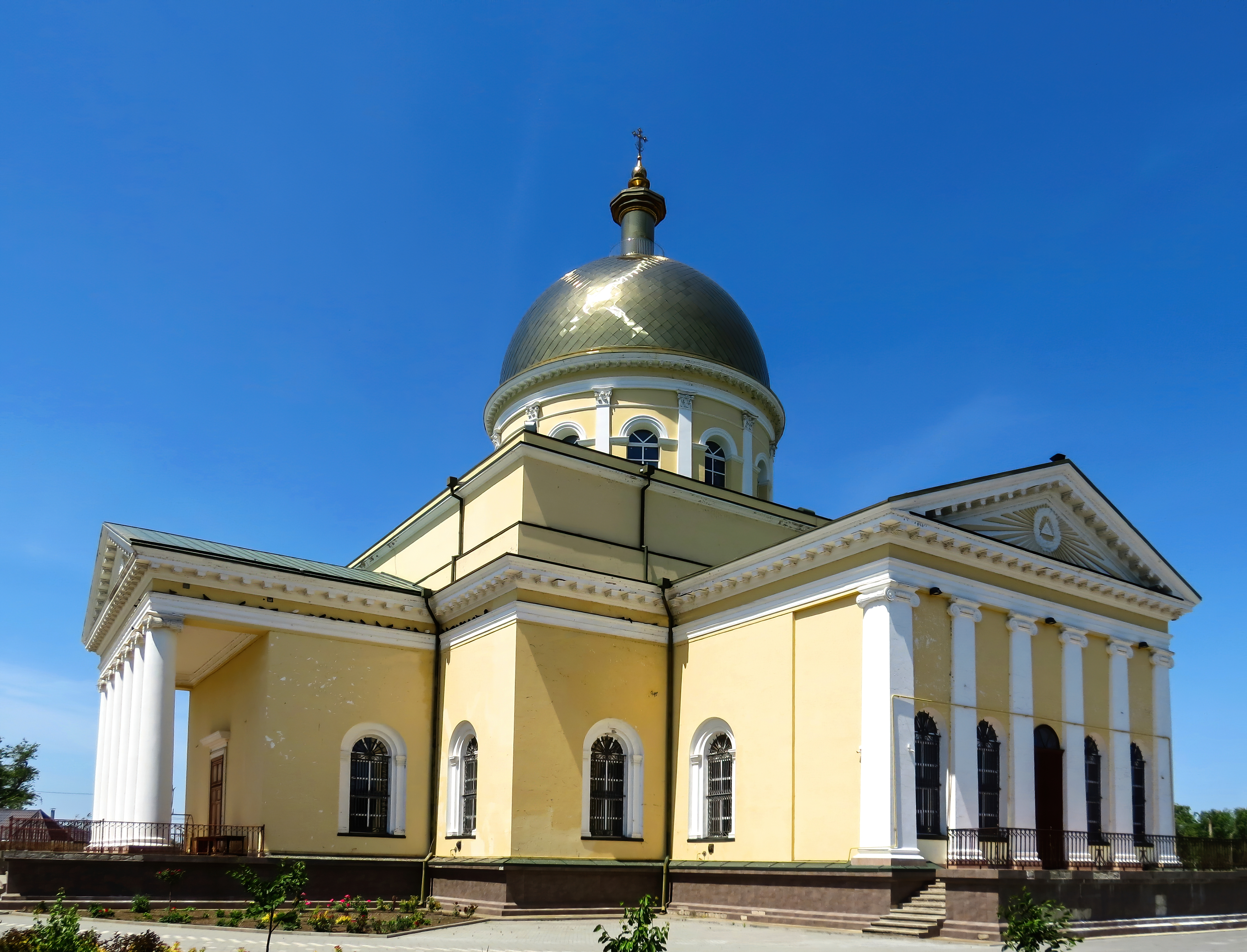
Transfiguration Cathedral, Bolhrad

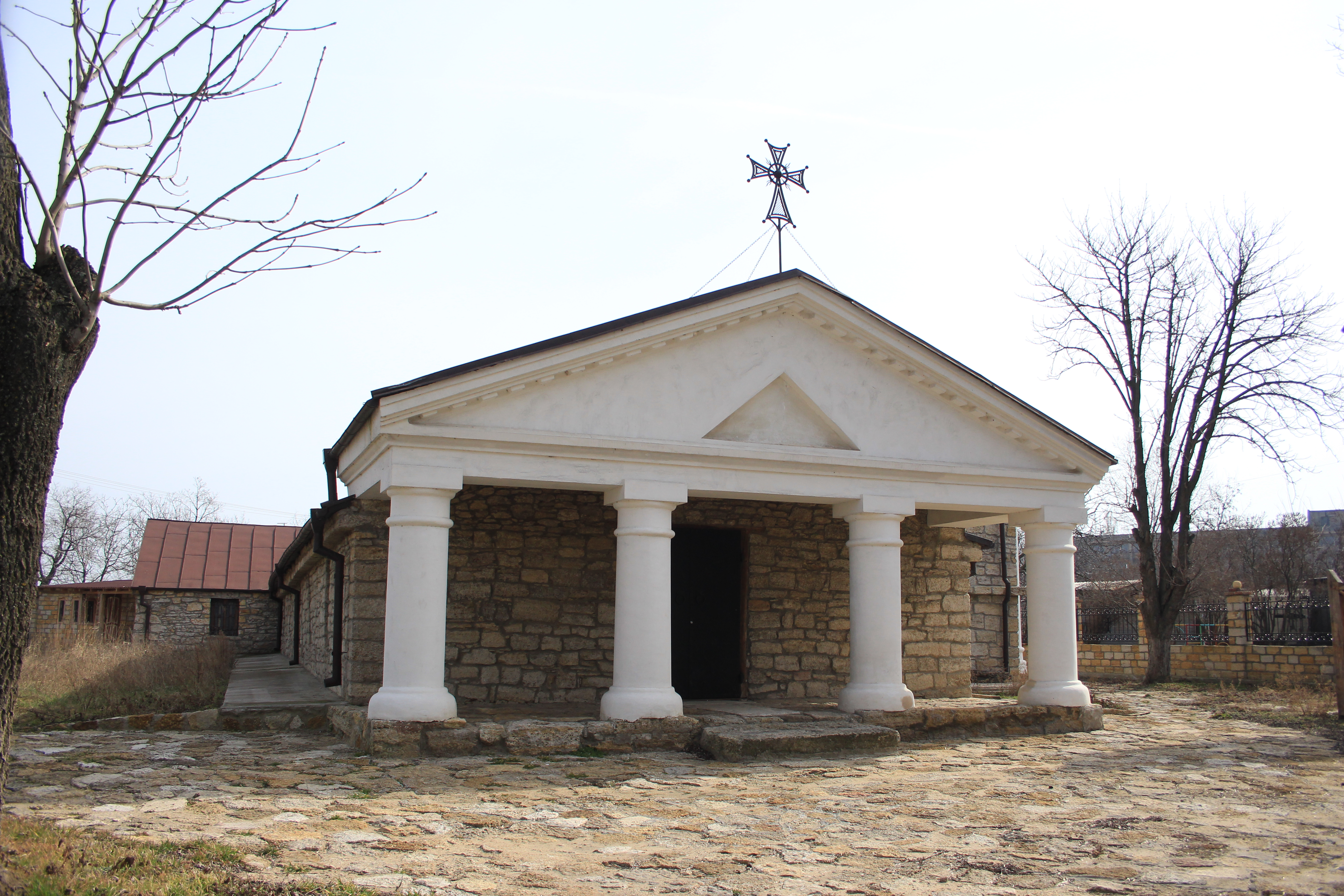
Old Armenian church, Bilhorod-Dnistrovskyi

== See also ==
- Subdivisions of Ukraine
- Kherson Governorate
- Budjak
- Transnistria
- Gagauzia
- Bessarabia
