= Shyriaieve Raion =

Former subdivision of Odesa Oblast, Ukraine

Shyriaieve Raion Ширяївський район
- Raion
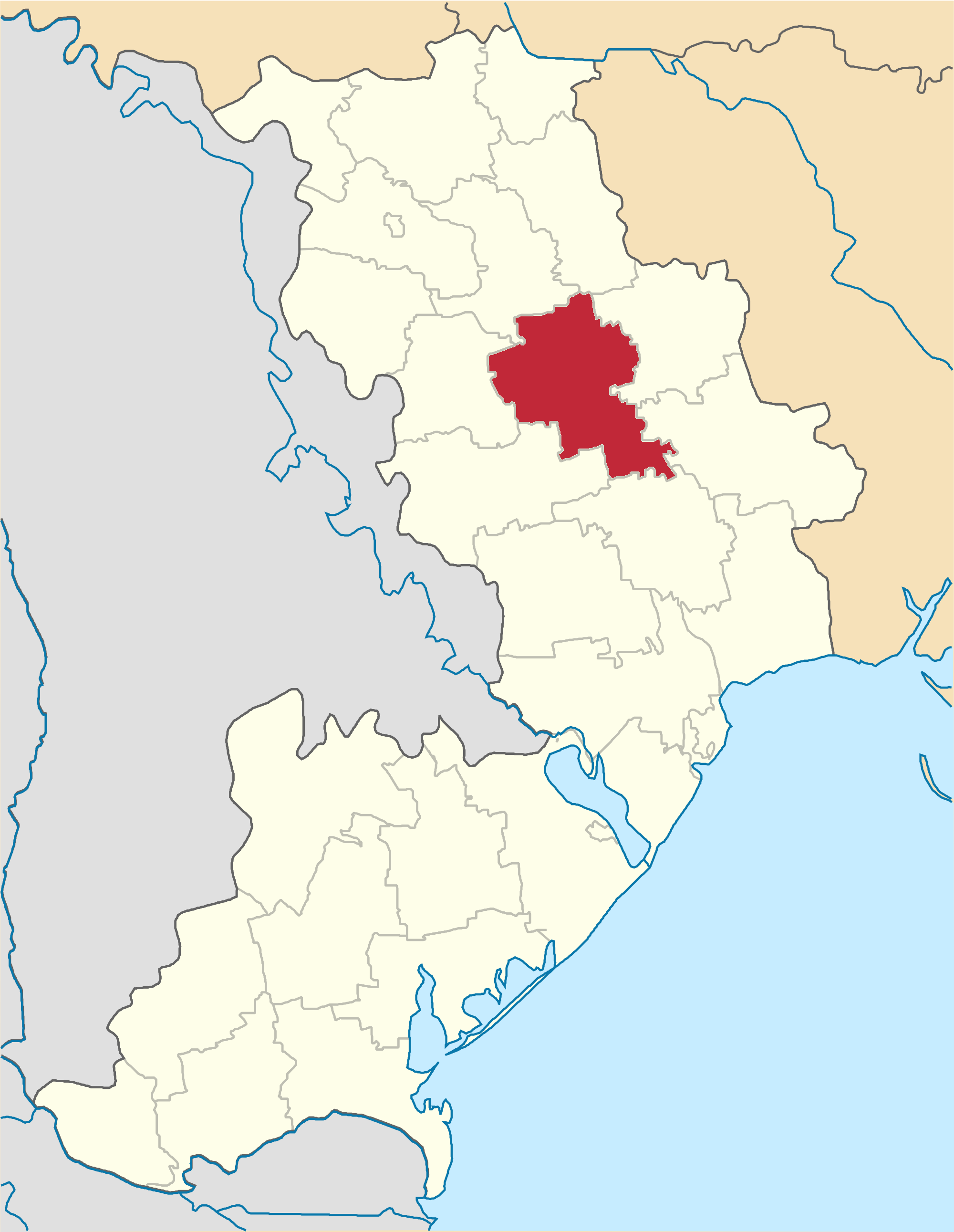
- Coordinates: 47°19′53″N 30°13′45″E
- Country: Ukraine
- Oblast: Odesa Oblast
- Established: 1935
- Disestablished: 18 July 2020
- Admin. center: Shyriaieve
- Subdivisions: List: 0 — city councils; 1 — settlement councils; 18 — rural councils; Number of localities: 0 — cities; 1 — urban-type settlements; 72 — villages; 0 — rural settlements

Government
  - Governor: Nataliya Kurtogyz

Area
  - Total: 1,502 km^{2} (580 sq mi)

Population (2020)
  - Total: 26,325 ▼
  - Density: 17.53/km^{2} (45.39/sq mi)
- Time zone: UTC+02:00 (EET)
  - Summer (DST): UTC+03:00 (EEST)
- Postal index: 66800—66864
- Area code: +380 4858
- Website: http://shiryaivo-rda.odessa.gov.ua

Shyriaieve Raion (Ukrainian: Ширяївський район) was a raion (district) in Odesa Oblast of Ukraine. Its administrative center was the urban-type settlement of Shyriaieve. The raion was abolished on 18 July 2020 as part of the administrative reform of Ukraine, which reduced the number of raions of Odesa Oblast to seven. The area of Shyriaieve Raion was merged into Berezivka Raion. According to the 2001 census, the majority of the population of the Şîreaieve district spoke Ukrainian (91.13%), with Romanian (4.3%) and Russian (3.62%) speakers in the minority. The last estimate of the raion population was 26,325 (2020 est.).

== Administrative divisions ==
At the time of disestablishment, the raion consisted of four hromadas:

- Chohodarivka rural hromada with the administration in the selo of Chohodarivka;
- Petrovirivka rural hromada with the administration in the selo of Petrovirivka;
- Stari Maiaky rural hromada with the administration in the selo of Stari Maiaky;
- Shyriaieve settlement hromada with the administration in Shyriaieve.

== History ==
Shyriaieve was founded in the end of the 18th century as Stepanovka (Stepanivka), named after the landowner Stepan Shyriay. The area was settled after 1792, when the lands between the Southern Bug and the Dniester were transferred to Russia according to the Iasi Peace Treaty. The area was included in Tiraspolsky Uyezd, which belonged to Yekaterinoslav Viceroyalty until 1795, Voznesensk Viceroyalty until 1796, Novorossiya Governorate until 1803, and Kherson Governorate until 1920. In 1834, the area was transferred to newly established Ananyevsky uezd. In the middle of the 19th century Stepanivka was formally renamed Shiryayevo (Shyriaieve).

On 16 April 1920, Odesa Governorate split off, and Ananyiv Uyezd was moved to Odesa Governorate, where it was abolished in 1921. In 1923, uyezds in Ukrainian Soviet Socialist Republic were abolished, and the governorates were divided into okruhas.
