= Shyriaieve =

Rural locality in Odesa Oblast, Ukraine

Shyriaieve Ширяєве
- Rural settlement
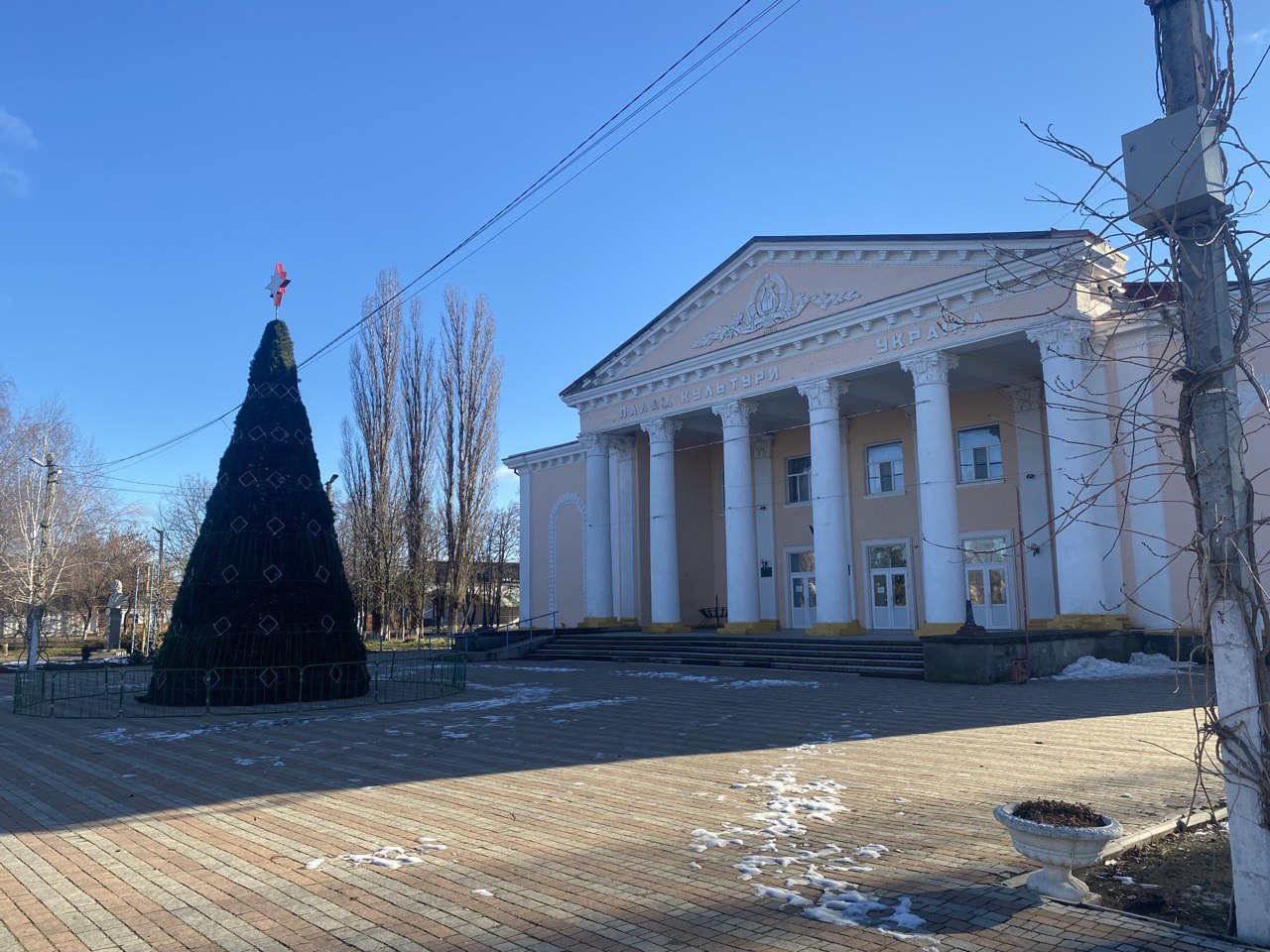
- Palace of culture

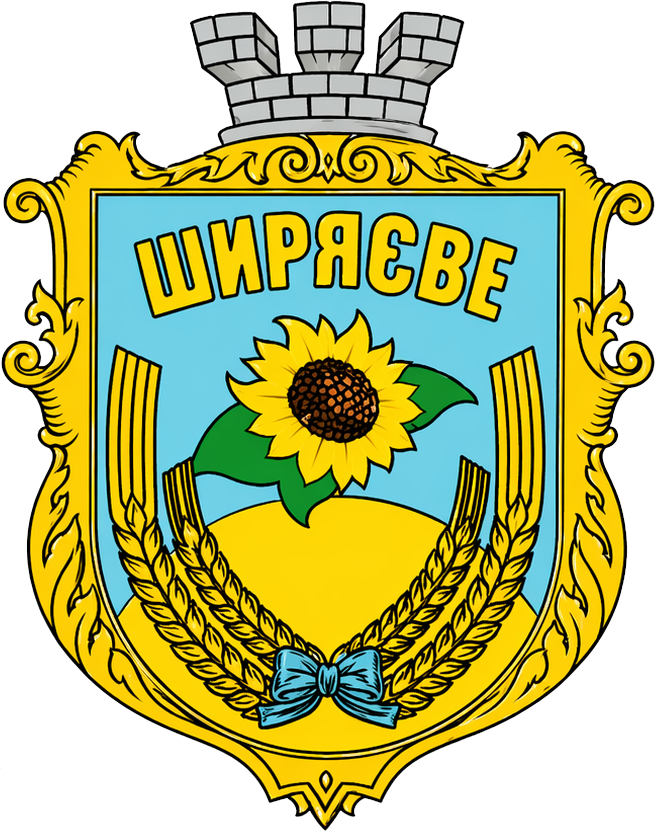
- Coat of arms

- Location within Odesa Oblast Location within Ukraine
- Coordinates: 47°23′16″N 30°11′28″E
- Country: Ukraine
- Oblast: Odesa Oblast
- Raion: Berezivka Raion
- Hromada: Shyriaieve settlement hromada

Population (2022)
  - Total: 6,326
- Time zone: UTC+2 (EET)
  - Summer (DST): UTC+3 (EEST)

Shyriaieve (Ukrainian: Ширяєве, Russian: Ширяево) is a rural settlement in the west of Odesa Oblast, Ukraine. It hosts the administration of Shyriaieve settlement hromada, one of the hromadas of Ukraine. Population: 6,326 (2022 estimate)

Shyriaieve is located on the banks of the Velykyi Kuialnyk.

== History ==
Shyriaieve was founded in the end of the 18th century as Stepanivka (Russian: Stepanovka), named after the landowner Stepan Shyriay. The area was settled after 1792, when the lands between the Southern Bug and the Dniester were transferred to Russia according to the Iasi Peace Treaty. The area was included in Tiraspolsky Uyezd, which belonged to Yekaterinoslav Viceroyalty until 1795, Voznesensk Viceroyalty until 1796, Novorossiya Governorate until 1803, and Kherson Governorate until 1920. In 1834, the area was transferred to newly established Ananyevsky Uyezd. In the middle of the 19th century it was formally renamed Shiriaieve (Shyriaievo).

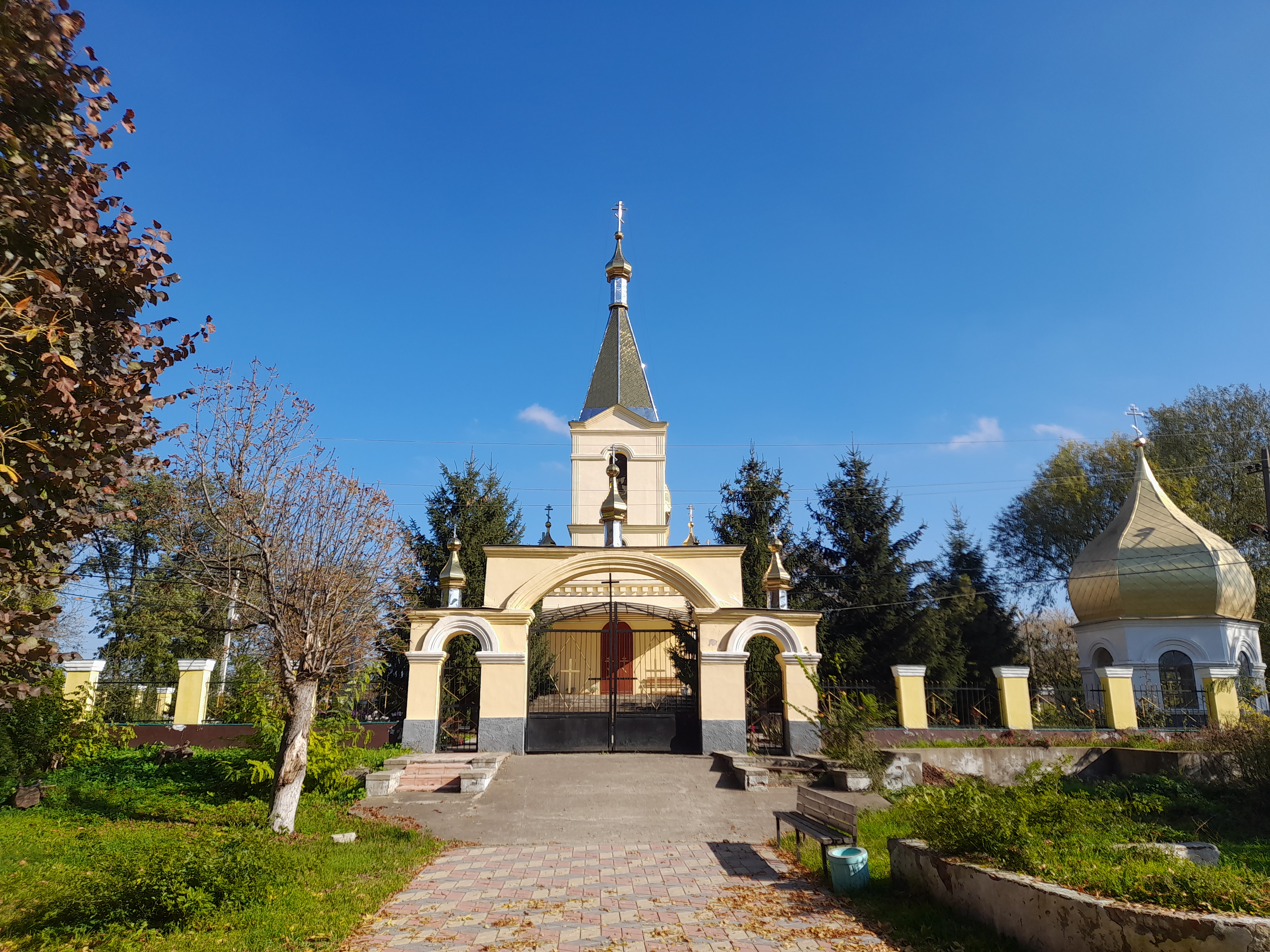
St. Michael church

On 16 April 1920, Odesa Governorate split off, and Ananiv Uyezd was moved to Odesa Governorate, where it was abolished in 1921. In 1923, uezds in Ukrainian Soviet Socialist Republic were abolished, and the governorates were divided into okruhas.

Until 18 July 2020, Shyriaieve was the administrative center of Shyriaieve Raion. The raion was abolished in July 2020 as part of the administrative reform of Ukraine, which reduced the number of raions of Odesa Oblast to seven. The area of Shyriaieve Raion was merged into Berezivka Raion.

Until 26 January 2024, Shyriaieve was designated urban-type settlement. On this day, a new law entered into force which abolished this status, and Shyriaieve became a rural settlement.

== Economy ==
=== Transportation ===
Shyriaieve has access to the M05 highway (Ukraine) which connects Kyiv and Odesa. Other roads connect it with Podilsk, Ananiv, and Berezivka.
