= Teodor Oizerman =

Soviet and Russian philosopher

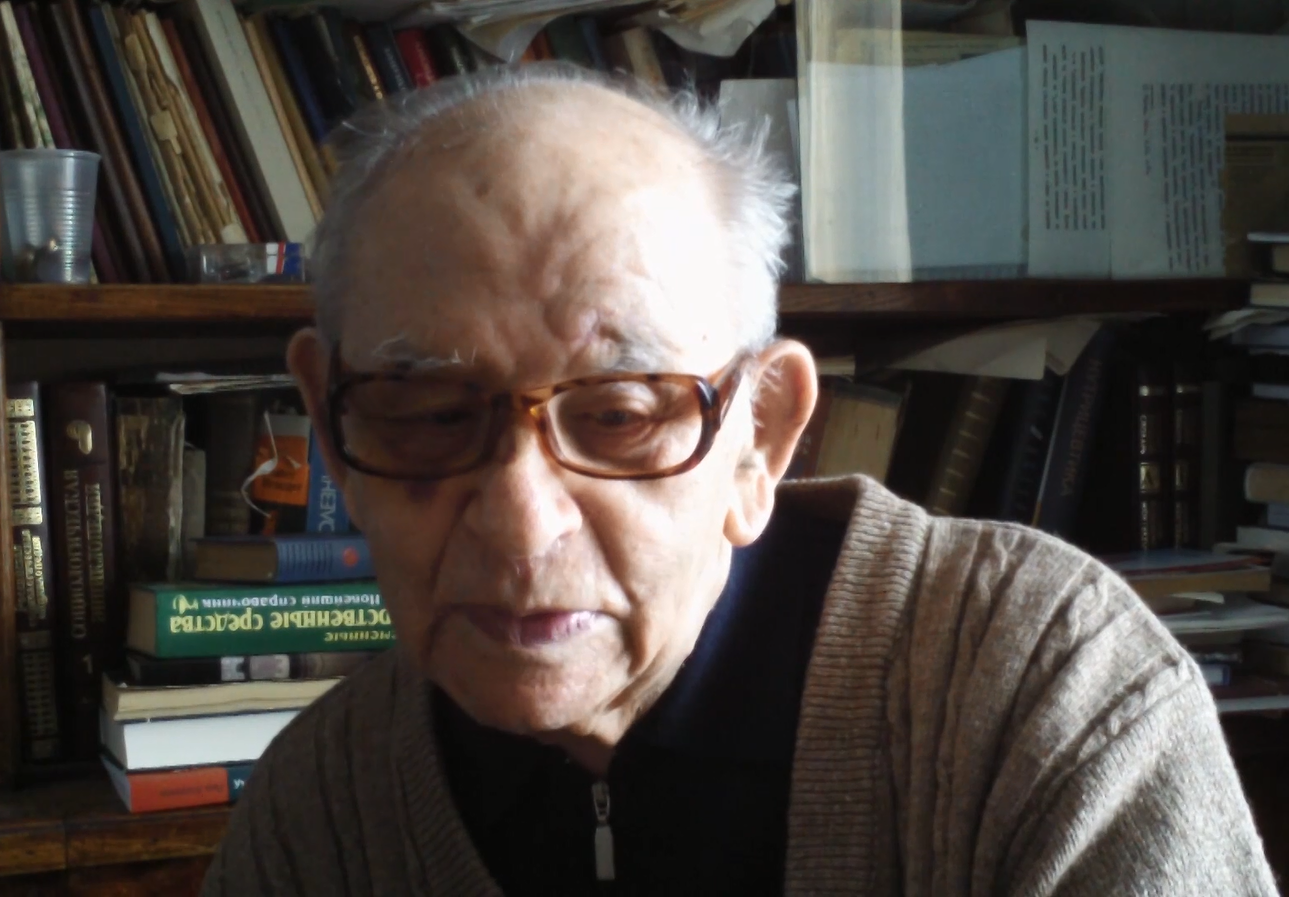
- Oizerman in 2012
- Born: 14 May [O.S. 1 May] 1914; Petrovirivka, Tiraspol uezd, Kherson Governorate, Russian Empire
- Died: 25 March 2017 (aged 102); Moscow, Russia

Education
- Education: Moscow State University (1938)

Philosophical work
- Era: Contemporary philosophy
- Region: Soviet philosophy Russian philosophy
- Main interests: History of Western and Marxist philosophy

Teodor Ilyich Oizerman (Russian: Теодор Ильич Ойзерман; 14 May [O.S. 1 May] 1914 – 25 March 2017) was a Soviet and Russian philosopher and academician.

== Biography ==
Oizerman was born in Petrovirivka into a Jewish family. His parents were teachers. During World War II, he served in the Red Army. Oizerman was a member of the Russian Academy of Sciences from 1981 until his death. He received an honorary doctorate from the University of Jena in 1979 and the USSR State Prize in 1983. In 1979, Oizerman was awarded the Plekhanov prize for the monograph The Main Trends in Philosophy. He also served on the Anti-Zionist Committee of the Soviet Public.

Following the 1991 break-up of the Soviet Union, Oizerman moved towards social democratic and anti-Leninist positions. He viewed Vladimir Lenin's interpretation and application of the ideas of Karl Marx and Friedrich Engels in the Russian Revolution as incorrect, and believed Lenin's view led towards oligarchy rather than the victorious establishment of the dictatorship of the proletariat. Oizerman died on 25 March 2017 in Moscow at the age of 102.

== Works ==
Oizerman was a prolific author. Below is a partial list of his monographs.

- Возникновение марксизма — революционный переворот в философии (with V.I. Svetlov). Moscow, 1948.
- Католическая философия империалистической реакции. Moscow, 1954.
- Немецкая классическая философия — один из теоретических источников марксизма. Moscow, 1955.
- Развитие марксистской теории на опыте революций 1948 г. Moscow, 1955.
- Философия Гегеля. Moscow, 1956.
- Обобщение Марксом и Энгельсом опыта революций 1848 г. (лекции). Moscow, 1956.
- Основные этапы развития домарксистской философии. Moscow, 1957.
- К. Маркс — основоположник диалектического и исторического материализма. Moscow, 1958.
- Неотомизм — философия современной реакционной буржуазии. Moscow, 1959.
- Основные черты современной буржуазной философии. Moscow, 1960.
- Чему учит и кому служит современная буржуазная социология (with A.F. Okulov). Moscow, 1960.
- Формирование философии марксизма. Moscow, 1962 (translated into English as "Making of the Marxist Philosophy" and into Arabic).
- Философия Фихте. Moscow, 1962.
- Проблемы историко-философской науки. Moscow, 1962 (translated into English as "Problems of the History of Philosophy", 1974, and into French as "Problèmes d'Histoire de la Philosophie", 1973 (as Théodore Oizerman)).
- Антикоммунизм — выражение кризиса буржуазной идеологии. Moscow, 1963.
- Zur Geschichte der vormarxistischen Philosophie. Berlin, 1963.
- Die Enstehung der marxistischen Philosophie. Berlin, 1965 и 1980.
- Проблема отчуждения и буржуазная легенда о марксизме. Moscow, 1965.
- Entfremdung als historische Kategorie. Berlin, 1966.
- Марксистско-ленинское понимание свободы. Moscow, 1967.
- Ленинские принципы научной критики идеализма. Доклад на Научной конференции по теме «Ленинский этап в развитии марксистской философии». Moscow, 1969.
- Главные философские направления: теоретический анализ историко-философского процесса. Moscow, 1971 (translated into English as "The main trends in philosophy: a theoretical analysis of the history of philosophy", 1988, and into Persian as "مسايل تاريخ فلسفه").
- Кризис современного идеализма, Moscow, 1972.
- Der junge Marx im ideologischen Kampf der Gegenwart. Frankfurt am Main, 1972.
- Философия И. Канта. Moscow, 1974.
- История диалектики XIV—XVIII вв (coauthored). Moscow, 1974.
- Философия Канта и современность. Moscow, 1974.
- Исторический материализм и идеология «технического пессимизма». Moscow, 1976.
- Научно-техническая революция и кризис современной буржуазной идеологии (coauthored). Moscow, 1978.
- История диалектики. Немецкая классическая философия (with A.S. Bogomolov, P.P. Gaydenko et al.). Moscow, 1978.
- Диалектический материализм и история философии (историко-философские очерки). Moscow, 1979.
  - Oizerman, Theodore (1982). Dialectical Materialism and the History of Philosophy: Essays on the History of Philosophy. Dmitri Beliavsky (translator). Moscow: Progress PublishersFirst published in Russian as «Диалектический материализм и история философии (историко-философские очерки)»
- Критика буржуазной концепции смерти философии. Moscow, 1980.
- Историко-философское учение Гегеля. Moscow, 1982.
- Основы теории историко-философского процесса (with A.S. Bogomolov). Moscow, 1983 (translated into English as "Principles of the Theory of the Historical Process in Philosophy", 1986, and into Arabic).
- Философия эпохи ранних буржуазных революций (coauthored). Moscow, 1983.
- Рациональное и иррациональное. Moscow, 1984.
- El materialismo dialectico у la historia de la filosofia. Havana, 1984.
- Ленин. Философия. Современность (with R.I. Kosolapov, A.G. Yegorov et al.). Moscow, 1985.
- Критика критического рационализма. Moscow, 1988.
- Felsefe Tarihinin Sorunları (Проблемы истории философии). Istanbul, 1988 и 1998.
- Маркс. Философия. Современность (with N.I. Lapin, M.Ya. Kovalzon, et al.). Moscow, 1988.
- Научно-философское воззрение марксизма. Moscow, 1989.
- Philosophie auf dem Wege zur Wissenschaft. Berlin, 1989.
- Философия раннего и позднего Шеллинга (With V.V. Lazarev). Moscow, 1990.
- Теория познания Канта (with I.S. Tsarskiy). Moscow, 1991.
- Теория познания. В 4-х томах. Институт философии АН СССР. Teodor Oizerman, ed. Moscow, 1991.
- Феноменология искусства (coauthored). Moscow, 1996.
- Философия как история философии. Saint Petersburg, 1999.
- Марксизм и утопизм. — М.: Прогресс—Традиция, 2003.
- Оправдание ревизионизма. — M.: Канон+, POOИ «Реабилитация», 2005.
- Возникновение марксизма. — М.: Канон + РООИ «Реабилитация», 2010.
