= Odesa Governorate =

Odesa Governorate Одеська губернія
- Governorate of Ukrainian SSR
- 1920–1925
- Capital: Odesa
- History
  - Split of Kherson Governorate: 1920
  - Moldavian ASSR: 1924
  - abolished (Okruhas of Ukraine): 1 August 1925
Preceded by
Kherson Governorate
Mykolaiv Governorate
Succeeded by
Moldavian Autonomous Soviet Socialist Republic
Odesa Okruha
Mykolaiv Okruha
Kherson Okruha
Zynovyevsk Okruha
Pershomaisk Okruha

Odesa Governorate (Ukrainian: Одеська губернія, romanized: Odeska huberniia), was a territorial division of the Ukrainian SSR (Ukraine) that was created in January 1920 by a decision of the All-Ukrainian Revolutionary Committee. The new governorate was initially created from the western part of the Kherson Governorate (which was later renamed Mykolaiv Governorate, and then merged with the rest of Odesa Governorate).

The western parts of the Odesa Governorate would serve as the foundation for the Moldavian Autonomous Soviet Socialist Republic in 1924.

Odesa Governorate was dissolved during the administrative reform of 1925.

== Subdivisions ==
A governorate was divided into counties (Russian uezd; Ukrainian povit).

- Ananiv county (1920–21)
- Balta county (1920–23)
- Voznesensk county
- Odesa county
- Pershomaisk county
- Tiraspol county

Former Mykolaiv Governorate

- Dnipro county
- Yelyzavetgrad county
- Mykolaiv county
- Kherson county
