= Petrovirivka =

Rural locality in Odesa Oblast, Ukraine

Petrovirivka Петровірівка
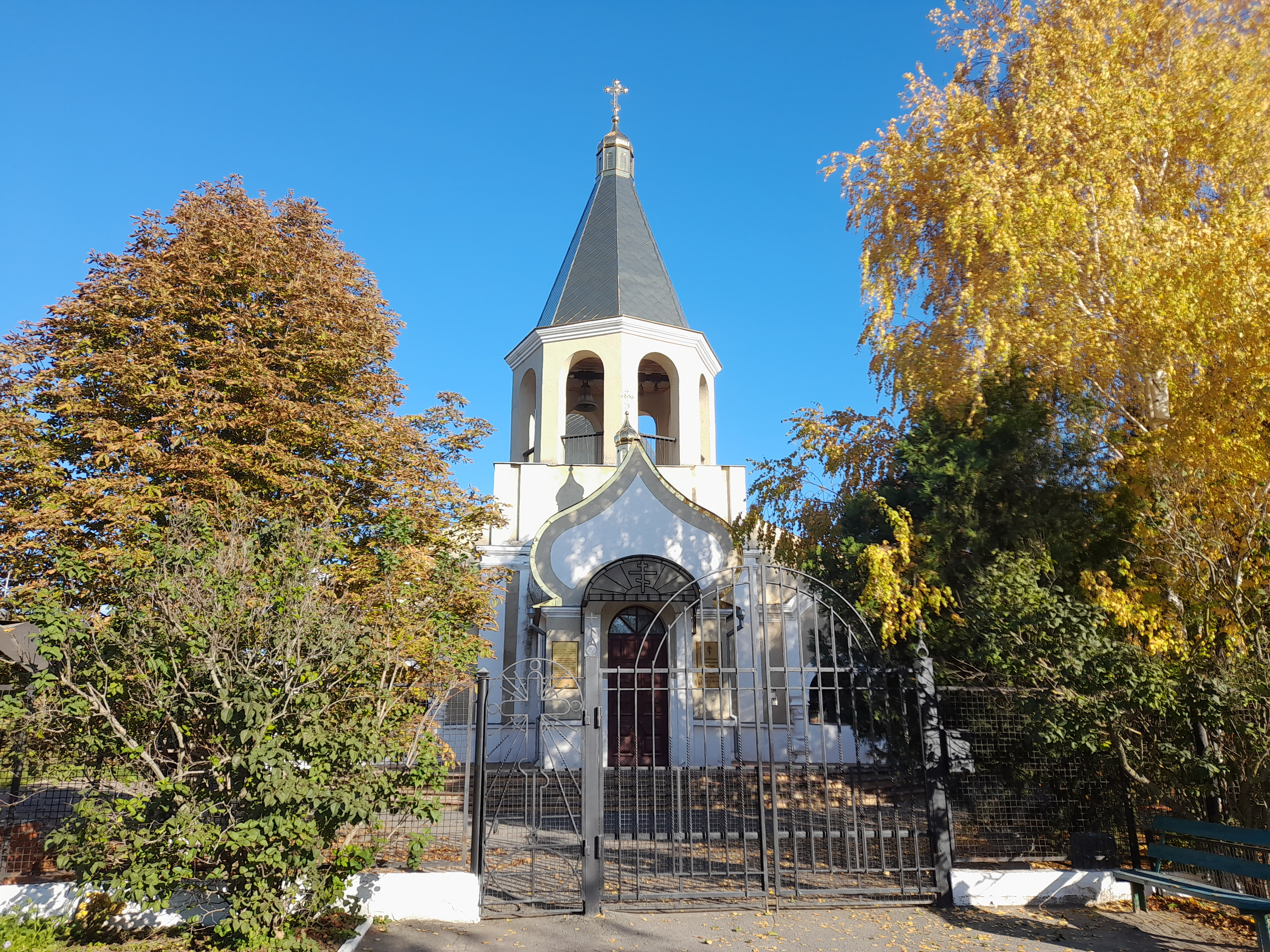

- Location within Odesa Oblast Location within Ukraine
- Country: Ukraine
- Oblast: Odesa Oblast
- Raion: Berezivka Raion
- Hromada: Petrovirivka rural hromada
- Time zone: UTC+2 (EET (Kyiv))
  - Summer (DST): UTC+3 (EEST)

Petrovirivka (Ukrainian: Петровірівка) is a village in Berezivka Raion, Odesa Oblast, Ukraine. It hosts the administration of Petrovirivka rural hromada, one of the hromadas of Ukraine.

Petrovirivka was founded as Petroverovka (Петроверовка) in 1814, and was then part of Tiraspolsky Uyezd, Kherson Governorate in the Russian Empire. Known by its Jewish inhabitants in the late 19th Century as Poplufsk, it was named Zhovten (Ukrainian: Жовтень) from 1927 to 2016.

Until 18 July 2020, Petrovirivka belonged to Shyriaieve Raion. The raion was abolished in July 2020 as part of the administrative reform of Ukraine, which reduced the number of raions of Odesa Oblast to seven. The area of Shyriaieve Raion was merged into Berezivka Raion.

Population of Petrovirivka is 2,900.

== Notable natives ==
- Teodor Oizerman, Soviet philosopher
