= Odessa uezd =

Odessa uezd Одесскій уѣздъ
- Uezd
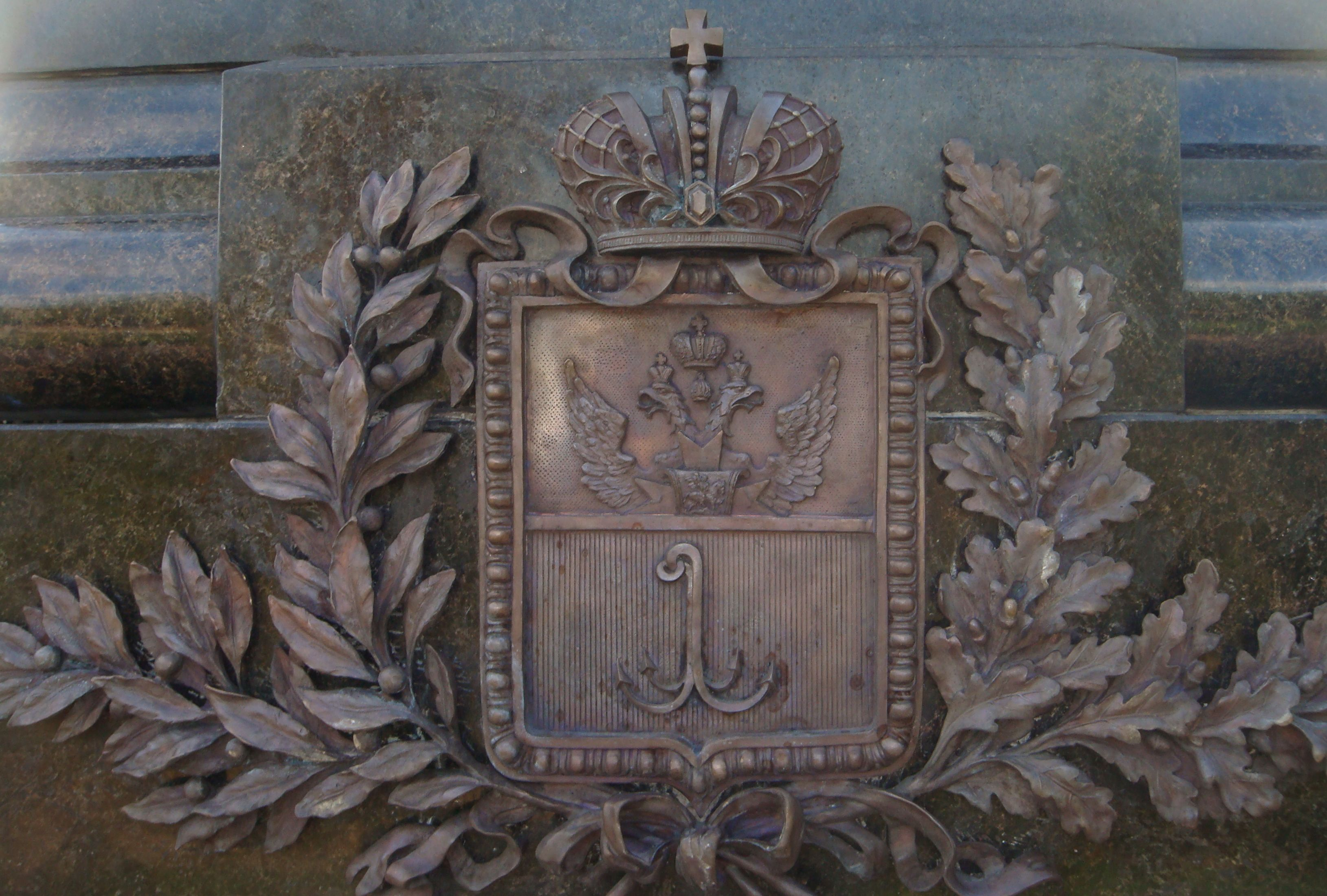
- Coat of arms

- Location in the Kherson Governorate
- Country: Russian Empire
- Governorate: Kherson
- Established: 1825
- Abolished: 7 March 1923
- Capital: Odessa

Area
  - Total: 10,552.11 km^{2} (4,074.19 sq mi)

Population (1897)
  - Total: 610,042
  - Density: 57.8123/km^{2} (149.733/sq mi)
  - Urban: 69.56%
  - Rural: 30.44%

The Odessa uezd (Note: Russian: Оде́сскій уѣ́здъ, romanized: Odésskiy uyézd; Ukrainian: Оде́ський пові́т, romanized: Odésʼkyi povít) was a county (uezd) of the Kherson Governorate of the Russian Empire. The uezd bordered the Tiraspol and Ananev uezds to the north, the Elisavetgrad uezd to the northeast, the Kherson uezd to the east, the Black Sea to the south, and the Akkerman uezd of the Bessarabia Governorate to the west. The administrative centre of the county was Odessa (Odesa).

== Administrative divisions ==
The subcounties (volosts) of the Odessa uezd in 1912 were as follows:

Name	Name in Russian	Capital
Alexandrovka volost	Александровская волость	Alexandrovka
Alexandro-feld volost	Александрофельдская волость	Alexandro-feld
Anatolevka volost	Анатольевская волость	Anatolevka
Antono-Kudintsevo volost	Антоно-Кудинцевская волость	Antono-Kudintsevo
Anchekrak-Ilyinskoe volost	Анчекракъ-Ильинская волость	Ilyinskoe
Baden volost	Баденская волость	Baden
Bolshoi-Buyalyk volost	Больше-Буялыкская волость	Bolshoi-Buyalyk
Belka volost	Бѣльчанская волость	Belka
Belyaevka volost	Бѣляевская волость	Bulyaevka
Gildendorf volost	Гильдендорфская волость	Gildendorf
Gradenits volost	Граденицкая волость	Gradenits
Zelts volost	Зельцская волость	Zelts
Ilyinka volost	Ильинская волость	Ilyinka
Kalagleya volost	Калаглейская волость	Kalagleya
Kovalevka volost	Ковалевская волость	Kovalevka
Korenikha volost	Коренихская волость	Korenikha
Kubanka volost	Кубанская волость	Kubanka
Kurisovo-Pokrovskoe volost	Курисово-Покровская волость	Kurisovo-Pokrovskoe
Kurtovka volost	Кутовская волость	Kutovka
Landau volost	Ландауская волость	Landau
Malo-Buyalykskoe volost	Мало-Буялыкская волость	Malo-Buyalykskoe
Mangeim volost	Мангеймская волость	Mangeim
Mariyinskoe volost	Маріинская волость	Mariyinskoe
Neizats volost	Нейзацкая волость	Neizats
Neifreidental volost	Нейфрейдентальская волость	Neifreidental
Nechayannoe volost	Нечаенская волость	Nechayannoe
Nikolaevskoe volost	Николаевская волость	Nikolaevskoe
Novo-Pokrovskoe volost	Ново-Покровская волость	Novo-Pokrovskoe
Petrovskoe volost	Петровская волость	Petrovskoe
Rasnopol volost	Раснопольская волость	Rasnopol
Rorbakh volost	Рорбахская волость	Rorbakh
Severinovka volost	Севериновская волость	Severinovka
Strasburg volost	Страсбургская волость	Strasburg
Tuzly volost	Тузловская волость	Tuzly

== Demographics ==
At the time of the Russian Empire Census on 28 January [O.S. 15 January] 1897, the Odessa uezd had a population of 610,042. including 322,899 men and 287,143 women. The majority of the population indicated Great Russian (Note: Prior to 1918, the Imperial Russian government classified Russians as the Great Russians, Ukrainians as the Little Russians, and Belarusians as the White Russians. After the creation of the Ukrainian People's Republic in 1918, the Little Russians identified themselves as "Ukrainian". Also, the Belarusian Democratic Republic which the White Russians identified themselves as "Belarusian".) to be their mother tongue, with significant Jewish and Little Russian speaking minorities.

Linguistic composition of the Odessa uezd in 1897
Language	Native speakers	Percentage
Great Russian	228,436	37.45
Jewish	134,020	21.97
Little Russian	133,474	21.88
German	62,658	10.27
Polish	18,467	3.03
Bulgarian	8,290	1.36
Greek	7,535	1.24
Romanian	7,138	1.17
White Russian	1,631	0.27
Tatar	1,516	0.25
Armenian	1,405	0.23
French	1,141	0.19
Italian	723	0.12
Czech	622	0.10
Latvian	410	0.07
Lithuanian	400	0.07
English	357	0.06
Turkish	331	0.05
South Slavic	284	0.05
Estonian	231	0.04
Georgian	188	0.03
Gipsy	169	0.03
Mordovian	59	0.01
Swedish	48	0.01
Others	509	0.08
Total	610,042	100.00
