= Yosypivka =

Yosypivka may refer to several places in Ukraine:

== Chernivtsi Oblast ==
- Yosypivka, Chernivtsi Raion

== Dnipropetrovsk Oblast ==
- Yosypivka, Samar Raion

== Ivano-Frankivsk Oblast ==
- Yosypivka, Ivano-Frankivsk Raion

== Kyiv Oblast ==
- Yosypivka, Bila Tserkva Raion

== Odesa Oblast ==
- Yosypivka, Berezivka Raion
- Yosypivka, Odesa Raion
- Yosypivka, Podilsk Raion
- Yosypivka, Rozdilna Raion

== Vinnytsia Oblast ==
- Yosypivka, Khmilnyk Raion
- Yosypivka, Mohyliv-Podilskyi Raion
