= Aleksandriya uezd =

Aleksandriya uezd Александрійскій уѣздъ
- Uezd
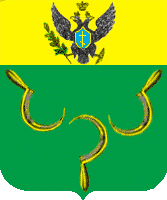
- Coat of arms

- Location in the Kherson Governorate
- Country: Russian Empire
- Governorate: Kherson
- Established: 1784
- Abolished: 7 March 1923
- Capital: Aleksandriya

Area
  - Total: 11,165.07 km^{2} (4,310.86 sq mi)

Population (1897)
  - Total: 416,576
  - Density: 37.3106/km^{2} (96.6341/sq mi)
  - Urban: 6.15%
  - Rural: 93.85%

The Aleksandriya uezd (Note: Russian: Александрі́йскій уѣ́здъ, romanized: Aleksandríyskiy uyézd; Ukrainian: Олександрі́йський пові́т, romanized: Oleksandríisʼkyi povít) was a county (uezd) of the Kherson Governorate of the Russian Empire. It bordered the Chigirin uezd of the Kiev Governorate to the north, the Kremenchug uezd to the northeast, the Verkhnedneprovsk uezd of the Yekaterinoslav Governorate to the east, the Kherson uezd to the south, and the Elisavetgrad uezd to the west. The Aleksandriya uezd was eponymously named for its administrative center, Aleksandriya (modern-day Oleksandriia).

== Administrative divisions ==
The subcounties (volosts) of the Aleksandriya uezd in 1912 were as follows:

| Name | Name in Russian | Capital |
|---|---|---|
| Adzhamka volost | Аджамская волость | Adzhamka |
| Bandurovka volost | Бандуровская волость | Bandurovka |
| Bogoyavlenskoe volost | Богоявленская волость | Bogoyavlenskoe |
| Bratolyubovka volost | Братолюбовская волость | Bratolyubovka |
| Verblyuzhka volost | Верблюжская волость | Verblyuzhka |
| Glinsk volost | Глинская волость | Glinsk |
| Dmitrovka volost | Дмитровская волость | Dmitrovka |
| Elisavetgradka volost | Елисаветградковская волость | Elisavetgradka |
| Zvenigorodka volost | Звенигородская волость | Zvenigorodka |
| Ivankovtsy volost | Иванковецкая волость | Ivankovtsy |
| Kosovka volost | Косовская волость | Kosovka |
| Krasnaya Kamyanka volost | Красно-Камянская волость | Krasnaya Kamyanka |
| Krasnoselye volost | Красносельская волость | Krasnoselye |
| Mashorino volost | Машоринская волость | Mashorino |
| Mironovka volost | Мироновская волость | Mironovka |
| Moiseevka volost | Моисеевская волость | Moiseevka |
| Novgorodka volost | Новгородская волость | Novgorodka |
| Novogeorgievsk volost | Новогеоргіевская волость | Novogeorgievsk |
| Novo Praga volost | Ново-Прагская волость | Novo Praga |
| Novostarodub volost | Новостародубская волость | Novostarodub |
| Onufrievka volost | Онуфріевская волость | Onufrievka |
| Ositnyazhka volost | Оситняжкская волость | Ostnyazhka |
| Pavlysh volost | Павлышская волость | Pavlysh |
| Petrovo volost | Петровская волость | Petrovo |
| Pokrovskoe volost | Покровская волость | Pokrovskoe |
| Svetlopolye volost | Свѣтлопольская волость | Svetlopolye |
| Stetsovka volost | Стецовская волость | Stetsovka |
| Subbotka volost | Субботская волость | unknown |
| Fedvar volost | Федварьская волость | Fedvar |
| Fedorovka volost | Федоровская волость | Fedorovka |
| Tsybulevo volost | Цыбулевская волость | Tsybulevo |

== Demographics ==
At the time of the Russian Empire Census on 28 January [O.S. 15 January] 1897, the Aleksandriya uezd had a population of 416,576, including 209,168 men and 207,408 women. The majority of the population indicated Little Russian (Note: Prior to 1918, the Imperial Russian government classified Russians as the Great Russians, Ukrainians as the Little Russians, and Belarusians as the White Russians. After the creation of the Ukrainian People's Republic in 1918, the Little Russians identified themselves as "Ukrainian". Also, the Belarusian Democratic Republic which the White Russians identified themselves as "Belarusian".) to be their mother tongue, with significant Great Russian and Jewish speaking minorities.

Linguistic composition of the Aleksandriya uezd in 1897
| Language | Native speakers | Percentage |
|---|---|---|
| Little Russian | 354,456 | 85.09 |
| Great Russian | 39,072 | 9.38 |
| Jewish | 15,322 | 3.68 |
| Romanian | 2,721 | 0.65 |
| White Russian | 2,354 | 0.56 |
| German | 1,356 | 0.33 |
| Polish | 966 | 0.23 |
| Gipsy | 120 | 0.03 |
| Tatar | 69 | 0.02 |
| Greek | 26 | 0.01 |
| Czech | 19 | 0.00 |
| French | 15 | 0.00 |
| Lithuanian | 12 | 0.00 |
| Turkish | 8 | 0.00 |
| Mordovian | 7 | 0.00 |
| Bulgarian | 6 | 0.00 |
| Armenian | 4 | 0.00 |
| Latvian | 4 | 0.00 |
| Italian | 2 | 0.00 |
| South Slavic | 2 | 0.00 |
| English | 1 | 0.00 |
| Estonian | 1 | 0.00 |
| Swedish | 1 | 0.00 |
| Others | 32 | 0.01 |
| Total | 416,576 | 100.00 |
