= Bobrynets =

City in Kirovohrad Oblast, Ukraine

Bobrynets Бобринець
- City
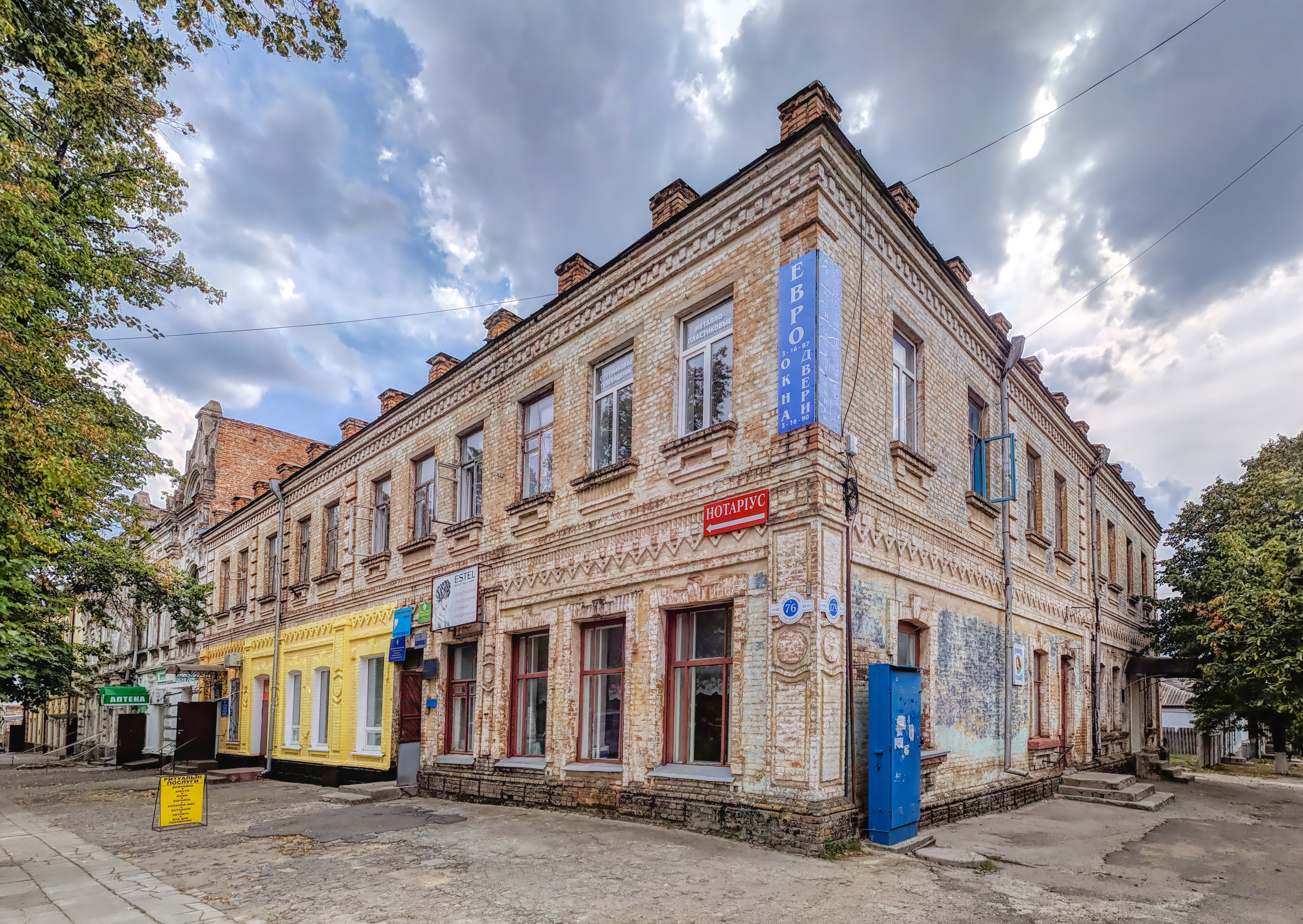
- Historic architecture at Mykolaivska Street

- Flag Coat of arms
- Interactive map of Bobrynets
- Location of Bobrynets Bobrynets (Ukraine)
- Coordinates: 48°3′28″N 32°9′29″E
- Country: Ukraine
- Oblast: Kirovohrad Oblast
- Raion: Kropyvnytskyi Raion
- Hromada: Bobrynets urban hromada
- Town rights: 1828

Population (2022)
  - Total: 10,396

Bobrynets (Ukrainian: Бобринець, IPA: [ˈbɔbrɪnetsʲ]; Russian: Бобринец; Yiddish: בוברניץ) is a city in Kropyvnytskyi Raion, Kirovohrad Oblast, Ukraine. It hosts the administration of Bobrynets urban hromada, one of the hromadas of Ukraine. Population: 10,396 (2022 estimate).

== History ==
Historical population
| Year | Pop. | ±% |
|---|---|---|
| 1860 | 10,194 | — |
| 1968 | 11,600 | +13.8% |
| 1989 | 12,869 | +10.9% |
| 2013 | 10,991 | −14.6% |

In 1767, the colonel of the Zaporozhian Cossacks, Andrii Keynash, reported to the Kish (Ukrainian Cossack administration) that the settlement of Bobrynets was founded near the Sugoklia River. According to the document of 1777, Vasyl Ostrovsky, a former Zaporozhian Cossack, was the capacious head. It was granted town status in 1828.

Under Russian rule, it was administratively located in the Yelisavetgradsky Uyezd of the Kherson Governorate. At the beginning of the 20th century, the Jewish population of the town was 3,500 inhabitants. During the Russian civil war (1918–1920), 160 Jews were killed during pogroms.

During the Ukrainian War of Independence, from 1917 to 1920, it passed between various factions. Afterwards, it was administratively part of the Mykolaiv Governorate of Ukraine.

During the Holodomor in 1932–1933, at least 146 residents of the city died.

Many left the city before the Germans occupied the area. During World War II, in 1941, Jews were kept prisoners in a ghetto. At the beginning of 1942, 358 Jews were murdered in mass executions perpetrated in the nearby forest.

In 2000, the parishioners of St. Nicholas Church joined the Ukrainian Orthodox Church of the Kyiv Patriarchate.

Until 18 July 2020, Bobrynets was the administrative center of Bobrynets Raion. The raion was abolished in July 2020 as part of the administrative reform of Ukraine, which reduced the number of raions of Kirovohrad Oblast to four. The area of Bobrynets Raion was merged into Kropyvnytskyi Raion.

== Geography ==
=== Climate ===
Climate data for Bobrynets (1981–2010)
| Month | Jan | Feb | Mar | Apr | May | Jun | Jul | Aug | Sep | Oct | Nov | Dec | Year |
|---|---|---|---|---|---|---|---|---|---|---|---|---|---|
| Mean daily maximum °C (°F) | −0.7 (30.7) | 0.2 (32.4) | 6.1 (43.0) | 15.2 (59.4) | 22.0 (71.6) | 25.2 (77.4) | 27.7 (81.9) | 27.4 (81.3) | 21.2 (70.2) | 14.0 (57.2) | 5.6 (42.1) | 0.6 (33.1) | 13.7 (56.7) |
| Daily mean °C (°F) | −3.4 (25.9) | −2.9 (26.8) | 1.9 (35.4) | 9.4 (48.9) | 15.8 (60.4) | 19.4 (66.9) | 21.6 (70.9) | 21.0 (69.8) | 15.3 (59.5) | 9.0 (48.2) | 2.4 (36.3) | −2.0 (28.4) | 9.0 (48.2) |
| Mean daily minimum °C (°F) | −6.1 (21.0) | −5.9 (21.4) | −1.8 (28.8) | 4.2 (39.6) | 9.7 (49.5) | 13.8 (56.8) | 15.6 (60.1) | 14.7 (58.5) | 9.9 (49.8) | 4.7 (40.5) | −0.5 (31.1) | −4.5 (23.9) | 4.5 (40.1) |
| Average precipitation mm (inches) | 32.0 (1.26) | 32.9 (1.30) | 29.9 (1.18) | 33.0 (1.30) | 48.3 (1.90) | 75.5 (2.97) | 54.9 (2.16) | 44.3 (1.74) | 53.5 (2.11) | 38.0 (1.50) | 37.7 (1.48) | 35.9 (1.41) | 515.9 (20.31) |
| Average precipitation days (≥ 1.0 mm) | 6.9 | 6.4 | 6.6 | 5.9 | 7.1 | 8.7 | 6.7 | 5.3 | 5.6 | 4.6 | 6.0 | 6.7 | 76.5 |
| Average relative humidity (%) | 84.6 | 82.5 | 77.2 | 65.9 | 61.4 | 65.9 | 63.5 | 61.4 | 68.2 | 76.2 | 85.1 | 86.2 | 73.2 |
Source: World Meteorological Organization

== Gallery ==
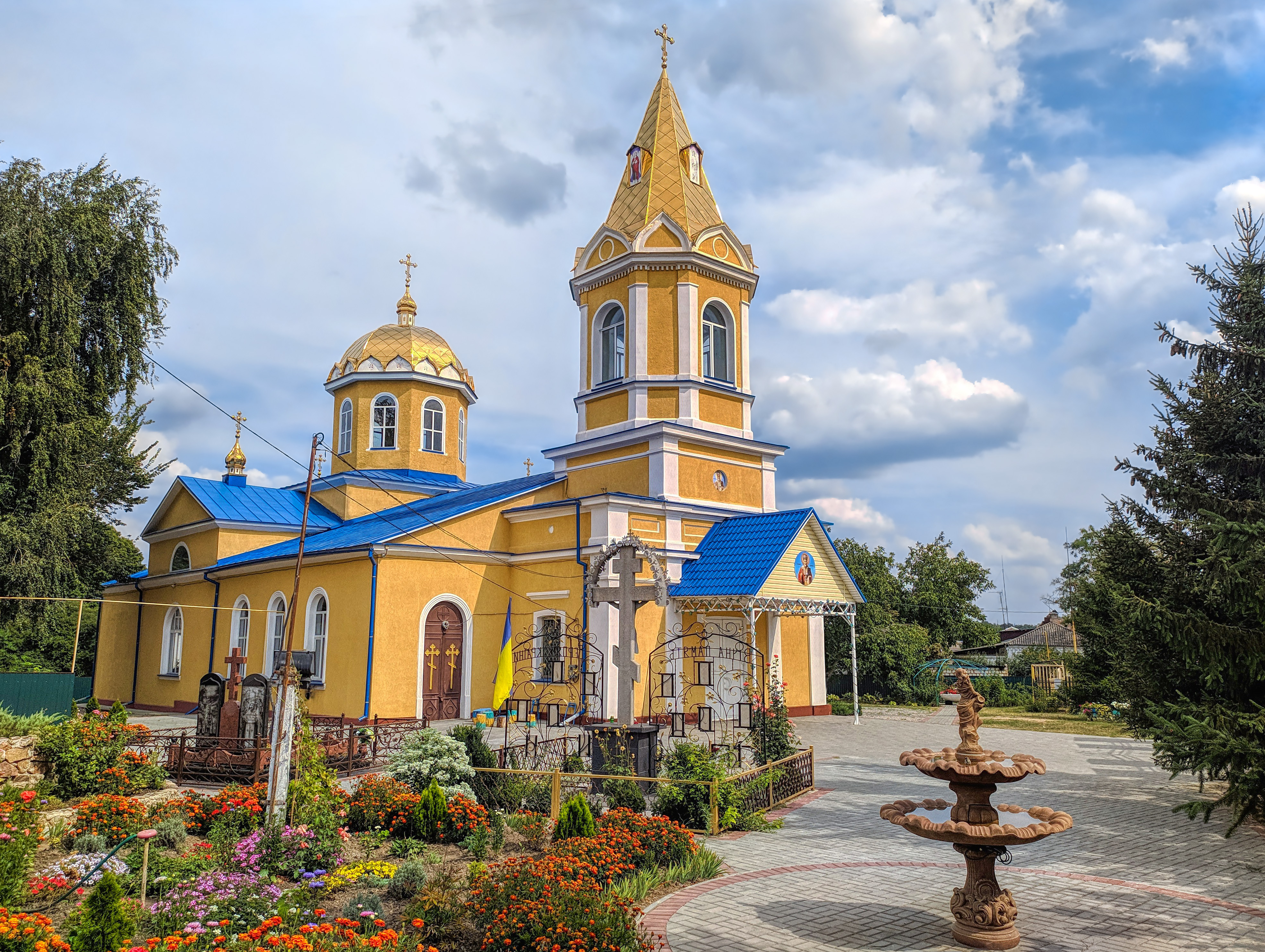
Saint Nicholas Church

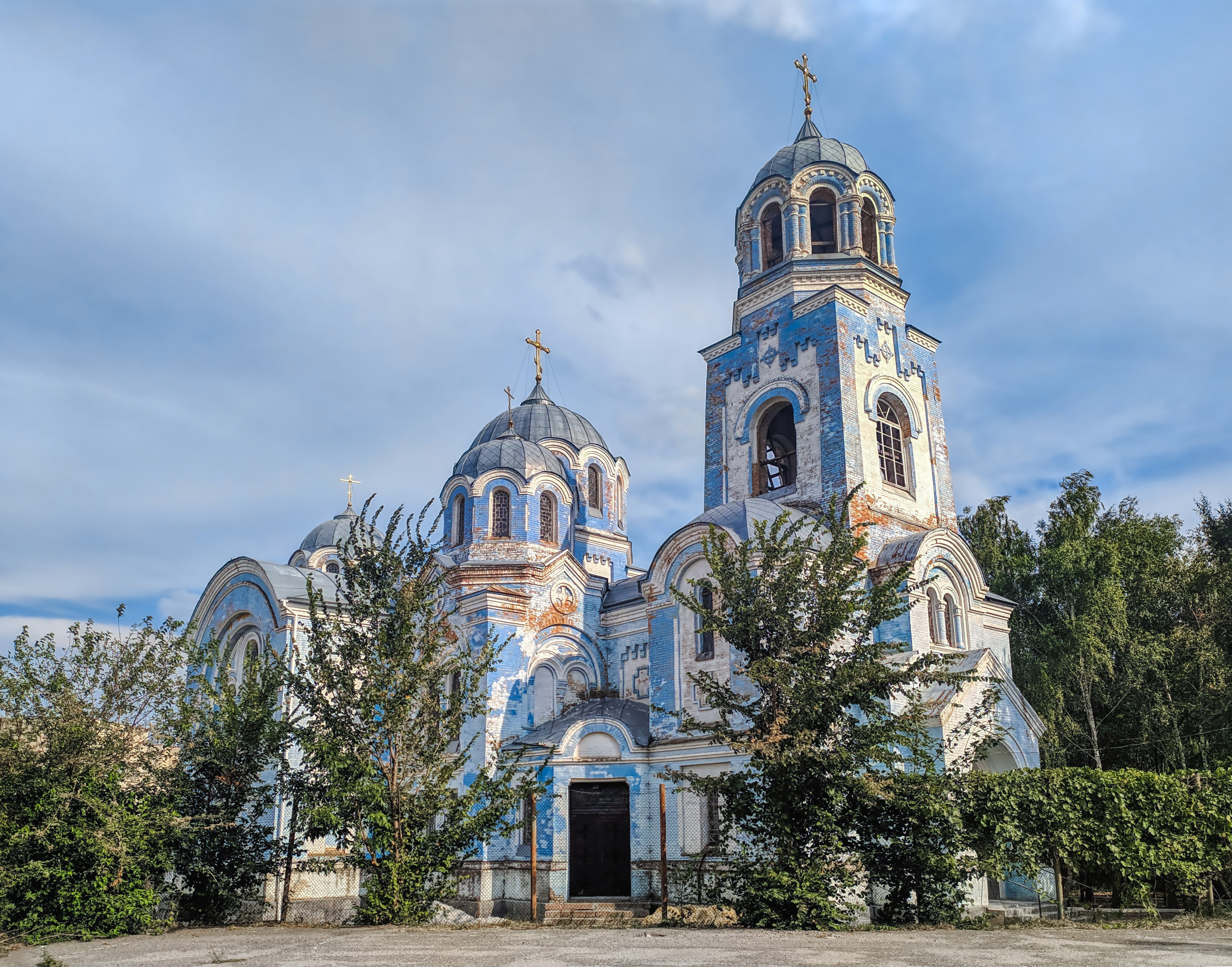
Ascension Church

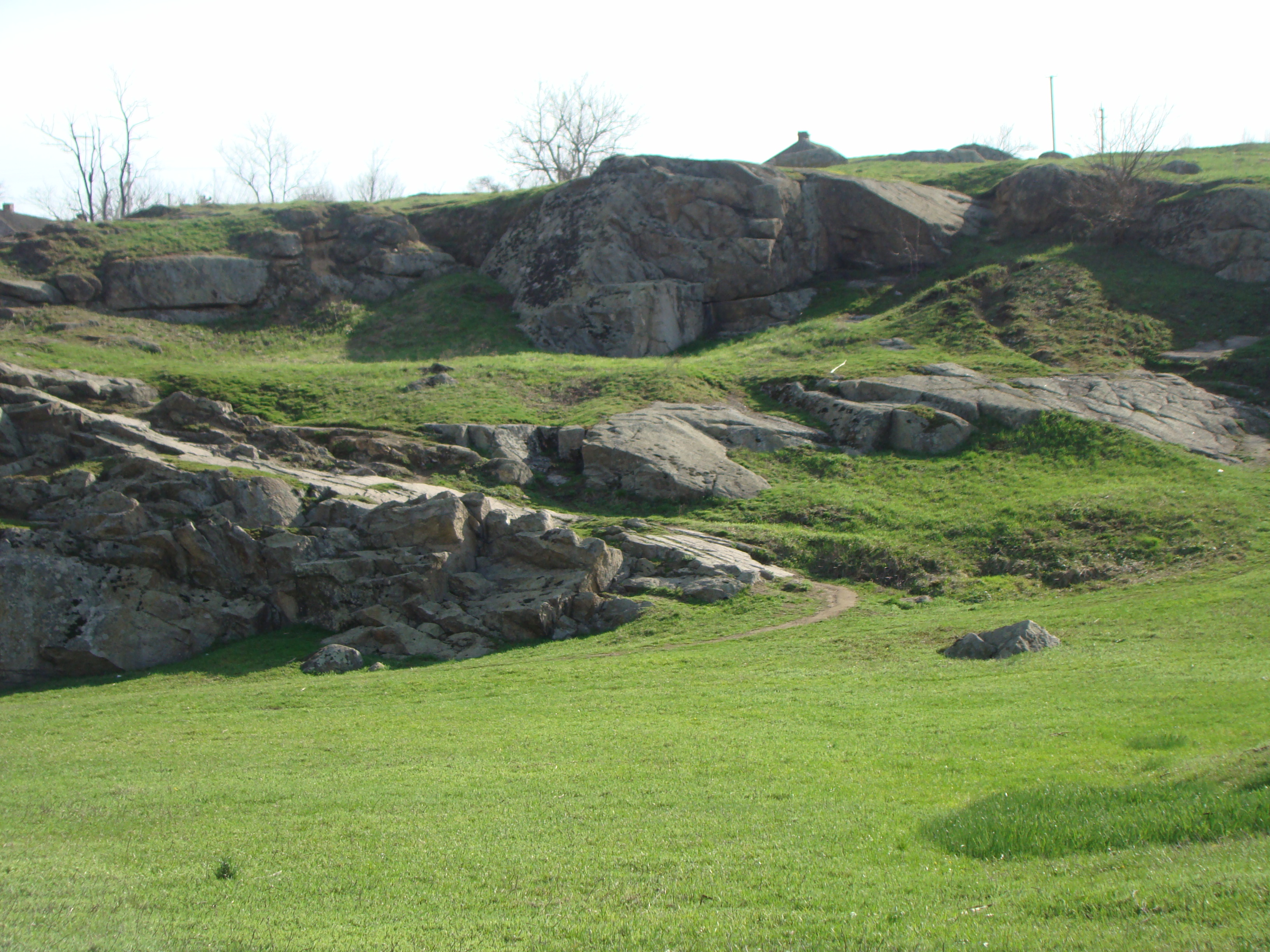
Nature park

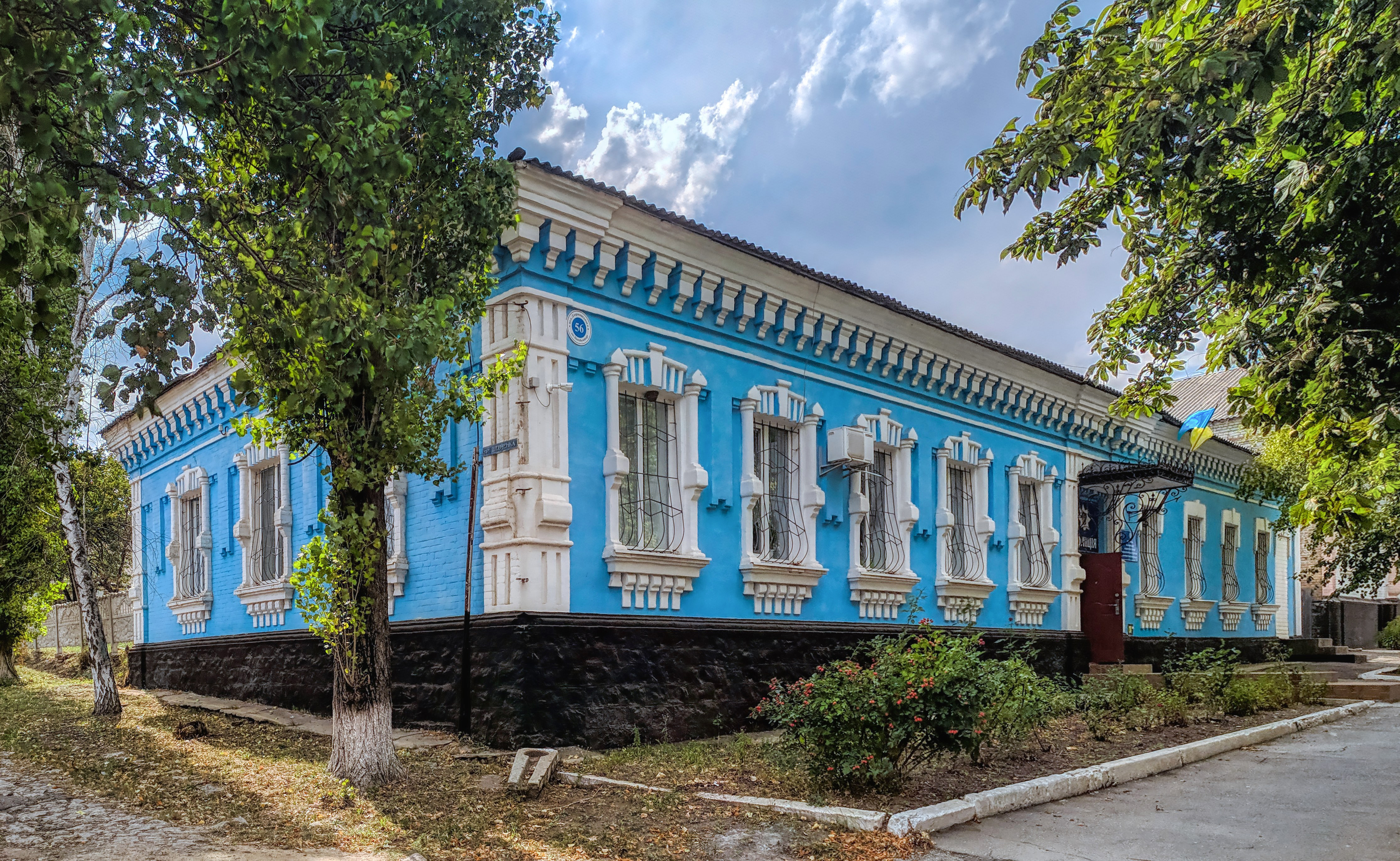
Police station

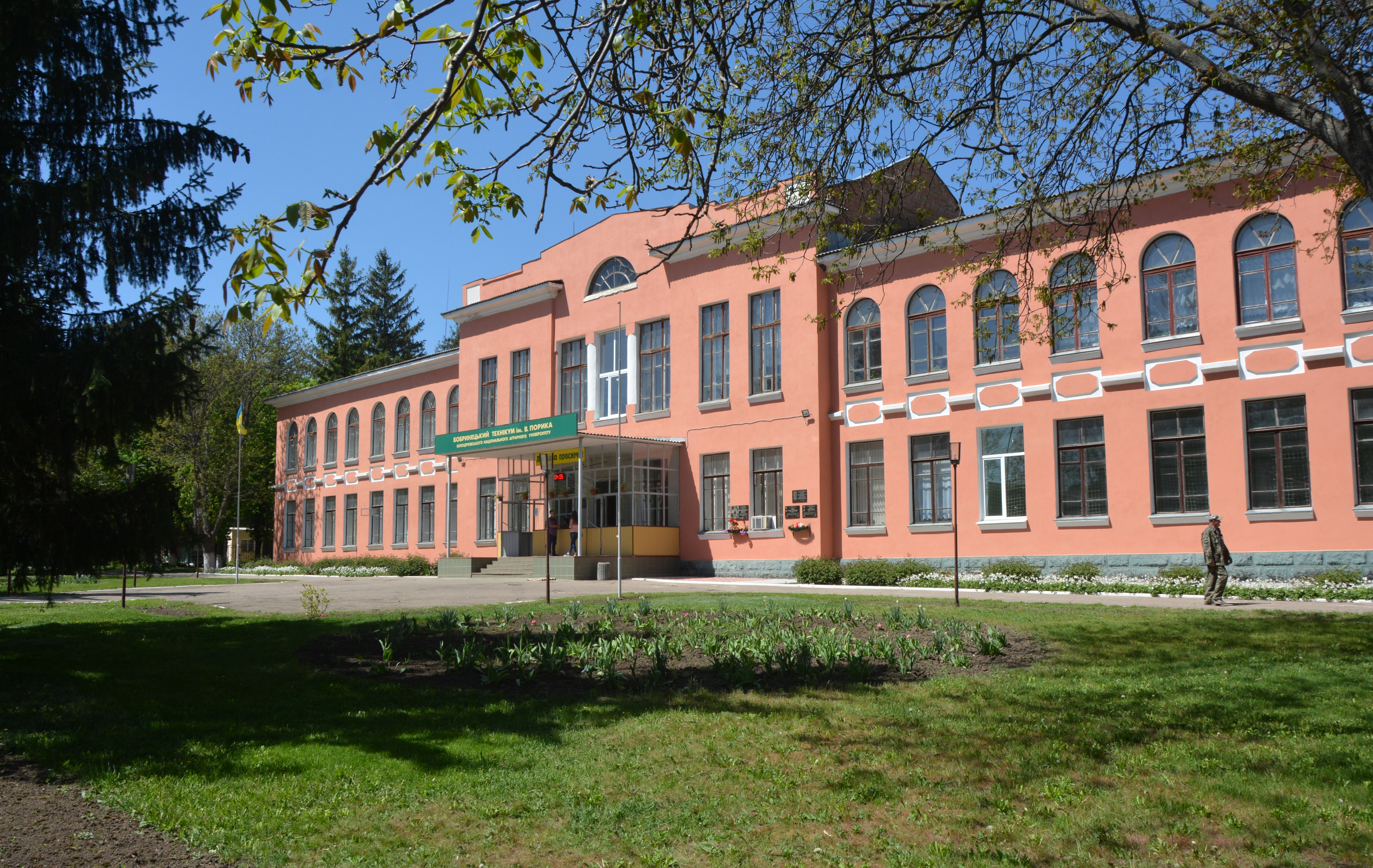
Agricultural Technical School

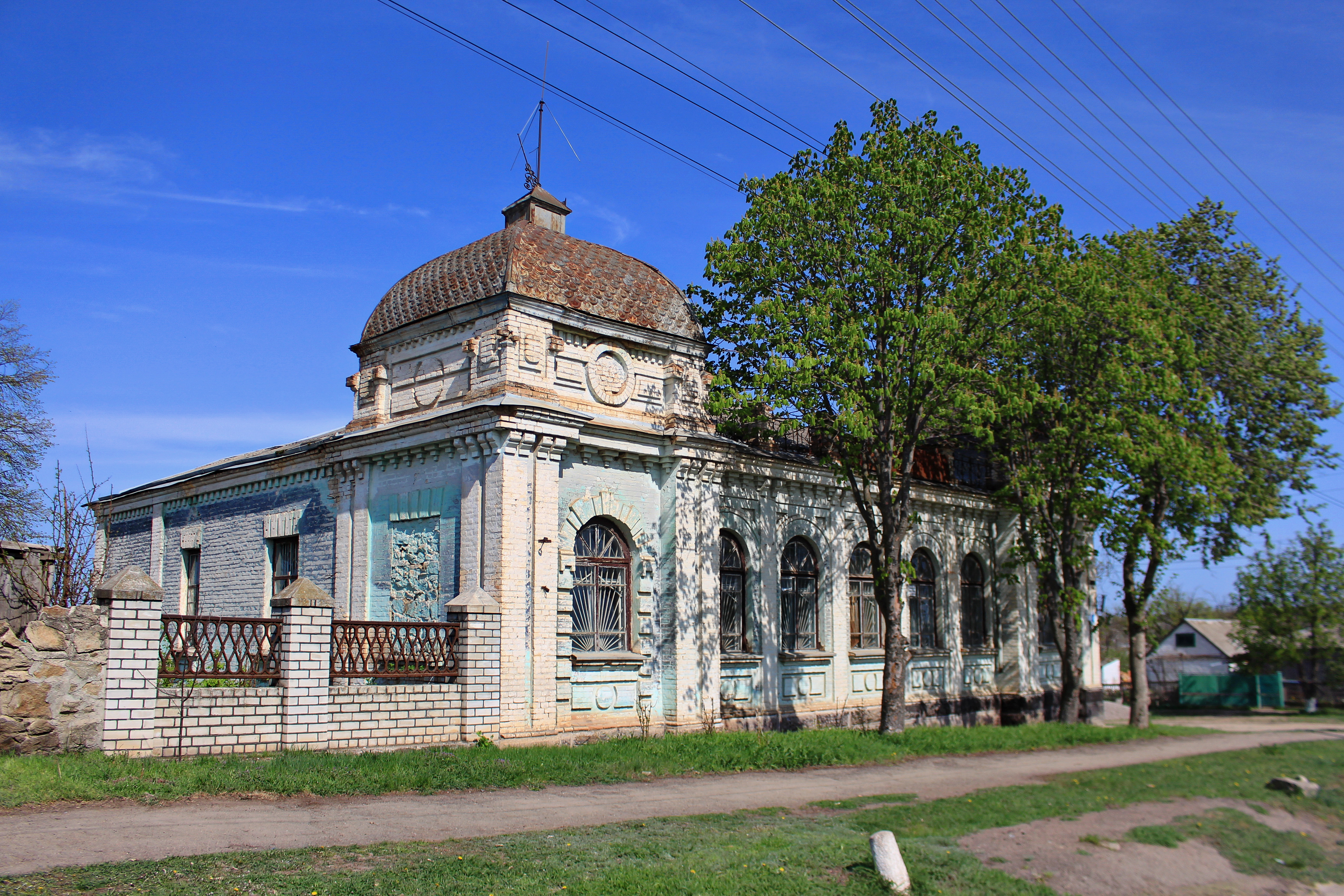
Synagogue
