= Kherson uezd =

Kherson uezd Херсонскій уѣздъ
- Uezd
- Coat of arms

- Location in the Kherson Governorate
- Country: Russian Empire
- Governorate: Kherson
- Established: 1776
- Abolished: 1923
- Capital: Kherson

Area
  - Total: 19,553.04 km^{2} (7,549.47 sq mi)

Population (1897)
  - Total: 587,804
  - Density: 30.0620/km^{2} (77.8603/sq mi)
  - Urban: 27.77%
  - Rural: 72.23%

The Kherson uezd (Note: Russian: Херсо́нскій уѣ́здъ, romanized: Khersónskiy uyézd; Ukrainian: Херсо́нський пові́т, romanized: Khersónsʼkyi povít) was a county (uezd) of the Kherson Governorate of the Russian Empire, and then of the Ukrainian People's Republic and the Ukrainian SSR until the administrative reform of 1923. The uezd bordered the Odessa uezd to the west, the Elisavetgrad uezd to the northwest, the Aleksandriya uezd to the north, the Verkhnedneprovsk and Yekaterinoslav uezds of the Yekaterinoslav Governorate to the east, the Melitopol and Dneprovsk uezds of the Taurida Governorate, and the Black Sea to the south. The district was eponymously named for its administrative center, Kherson.

== Administrative divisions ==
The subcounties (volosts) of the Kherson uezd in 1912 were as follows:

Name	Name in Russian	Capital
Alexandrovka volost	Александровская волость	Alexandrovka
Antonovka volost	Антоновская волость	Antonovka
Balatskoe volost	Балацковская волость	Balatskoe
Belozerka volost	Бѣлозерская волость	Belozerka
Vavilovka volost	Вавиловская волость	Vavilovka
Vladimirovka volost	Владиміровская волость	Vladimirovka
Grushevka volost	Грушевская волость	Grushevka
Gurevka volost	Гурьевская волость	Gurevka
Zagradovka volost	Заградовская волость	Zagradovka
Zaselye volost	Засельская волость	Zaselye
Zolotaya Balka volost	Затоло-Балковская волость	Zolotaya Balka
Kazatskoe volost	Казацкая волость	Kazatskoe
Kaluzhskoe volost	Калужская волость	Kaluzhskoe
Kamyanka volost	Камянская волость	Kamyanka
Kachkarovka volost	Качкаровская волость	Kachkarovka
Kislyakovka volost	Кисляковская волость	Kislyakovka
Krivoy Rog volost	Криворогская волость	Krivoy Rog
Kronau volost	Кронауская волость	Kronau
Lyubomirka volost	Любомирская волость	Lyubomirka
Maryinskoe volost	Марьинская волость	Maryinskoe
Mikhailovka volost	Михайловская волость	Mikhailovka
Nikolaevka 1-aya volost	Николаевская 1-я волость	Nikolaev 1-aya
Nikolaevka 2-aya volost	Николаевская 2-я волость	Nikolaev 2-aya
Nikolskoe volost	Никольская волость	Nikolskoe
Novyi Bug volost	Ново-Бугская волость	Novyi Buh
Novo-Vorontsovka volost	Ново-Воронцовская волость	Novovorontsovka
Novo-Nikolaevka volost	Ново-Николаевская волость	Novo-Nikolaevka
Novaya Odessa volost	Ново-Одесская волость	Novaya Odessa
Orlaph volost	Орлафская волость	Orlaph
Otbedovasilevka volost	Отбѣдовасильевская волость	Otbedovasilevka
Pokrovskoe volost	Покровская волость	Pokrovskoe
Poltavka volost	Полтавская волость	Poltavka
Privolnoe volost	Привольнянская волость	Privolnoe
Stanislav volost	Станиславская волость	Stanislav
Staroshvedskoe volost	Старошведская волость	Staroshvedskoe
Ternovka volost	Терновская волость	Ternovka (now neighborhood of Mykolaiv)
Tyaginka volost	Тягинская волость	Tyaginka
Shirokoe volost	Широковская волость	Shyroke

== Demographics ==
At the time of the Russian Empire Census on 28 January [O.S. 15 January] 1897, the Kherson uezd had a population of 587,804, including 302,002 men and 285,502 women. The majority of the population indicated Little Russian (Note: Prior to 1918, the Imperial Russian government classified Russians as the Great Russians, Ukrainians as the Little Russians, and Belarusians as the White Russians. After the creation of the Ukrainian People's Republic in 1918, the Little Russians identified themselves as "Ukrainian". Also, the Belarusian Democratic Republic which the White Russians identified themselves as "Belarusian".) to be their mother tongue, with significant Russian, Jewish, and German speaking minorities.

Linguistic composition of the Kherson uezd in 1897
Language	Native speakers	Percentage
Ukrainian	323,627	55.06
Russian	144,623	24.60
Jewish	69,674	11.85
German	20,290	3.45
Belarusian	12,558	2.14
Polish	5,152	0.88
Romanian	4,953	0.84
Bulgarian	3,575	0.60
Tatar	1,057	0.18
Swedish	501	0.09
Greek	295	0.05
Gypsy	235	0.04
Czech	192	0.03
Armenian	141	0.02
French	139	0.02
Latvian	129	0.02
English	93	0.01
Turkish	91	0.01
Italian	68	0.01
South Slavic	63	0.01
Estonian	60	0.01
Lithuanian	38	0.00
Mordovian	26	0.00
Georgian	5	0.00
Others	119	0.02
Total	587,804	100.00
