= Yosypivka, Berezivka Raion, Odesa Oblast =

Rural locality in Odesa Oblast, Ukraine

Yosypivka Йосипівка
- Location in Ukraine Yosypivka (Odesa Oblast)
- Coordinates: 47°25′10″N 30°14′21″E
- Country: Ukraine
- Oblast: Odesa Oblast
- Raion: Berezivka Raion
- Hromada: Shyriaieve settlement hromada
- Village founded: 1830

Area
  - Total: 0.39 km^{2} (0.15 sq mi)

Population (2001)
  - Total: 105
- Time zone: UTC+2 (EET)
  - Summer (DST): UTC+3 (EEST)
- Postal code: 66802
- Area code: +380 4858

Yosypivka (Ukrainian: Йосипівка) is a village in Berezivka Raion, Odesa Oblast, Ukraine. It belongs to Shyriaieve settlement hromada, one of the hromadas of Ukraine.

== History ==
During the Holodomor organized by the Soviet authorities in 1932—1933, at least 5 villagers died. According to the 1989 census of the Ukrainian SSR, the village's population was 144 people, of whom 71 were men and 73 were women. According to the 2001 Ukrainian census, 105 people lived in the village.

== See also ==
- List of settlements affected by the Holodomor of 1932—1933 (Odesa Oblast)
