= Elisavetgrad uezd =

Elisavetgrad uezd Елисаветградскій уѣздъ
- Uezd
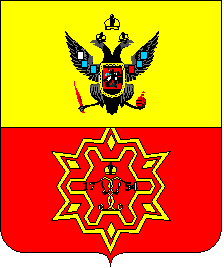
- Coat of arms

- Location in the Kherson Governorate
- Country: Russian Empire
- Governorate: Kherson
- Established: 1776 and 1865
- Abolished: 1828 and 1923
- Capital: Elisavetgrad

Area
  - Total: 15,866.86 km^{2} (6,126.23 sq mi)

Population (1897)
  - Total: 613,283
  - Density: 38.6518/km^{2} (100.108/sq mi)
  - Urban: 17.57%
  - Rural: 82.43%

The Elisavetgrad uezd (Note: Russian: Елисаветгра́дскій уѣ́здъ, romanized: Yelisavetgrádskiy uyézd; Ukrainian: Єлисаветгра́дський пові́т, romanized: Yelisavethrádsʼkyi povít) was a county (uezd) of the Kherson Governorate of the Russian Empire, with its administrative center in Yelisavetgrad (modern Kropyvnytskyi). It bordered the Zvenigorodka and Chigirin uezds of the Kiev Governorate to the north, the Aleksandriya uezd to the east, the Kherson uezd to the south, and the Ananev uezd to the west. The uezd corresponded to Kirovohrad and Mykolaiv Oblasts. Most of the land was owned by the noble Skarzynski family until 1909.

== Administrative divisions ==
The subcounties (volosts) of the Elisavetgrad uezd in 1912 were as follows:

Name	Name in Russian	Capital
Akimovka volost	Акимовская волость	Akimovka
Alexandrovka volost	Александровская волость	Alexandrovka
Alexeevka volost	Алексѣевская волость	Alexeevka
Anninskoe volost	Аннинская волость	Stogovka-Anninskoe
Annovka volost	Анновская волость	Annovka
Antonovka volost	Антоновская волость	Antonovka
Berezovka volost	Березовская волость	Berezovka
Blagodatnoe volost	Благодатновская волость	Blagodatnoe
Bolshaya-Byska volost	Болше-Высковская волость	Bolshaya-Byska
Bratskoe volost	Братская волость	Bratskoe
Viktorshtad volost	Викторштадская волость	Viktorshtad
Vityazevka volost	Витязевская волость	Vityazevka
Vladimirovka volost	Владимировская волость	Vladimirovka
Voznesensk volost	Вознесенская волость	Voznesensk
Vozsiyatskoe volost	Возсіятовская волость	Vozsiyatskoe
Glodossy volost	Глодосская волость	Glodossy
Gruzschany volost	Грузсчанская волость	Gruzschany
Gromkleya	Громклея	Gromkleya
Gobro-Velichkovka volost	Гобро-Величковская волость	Dobro-Velichkovka
Elanets volost	Еленецкая волость	Elenets
Zlynka volost	Злынская волость	Zlynka
Kazanka volost	Казанская волость	Kazanka
Ketrisanovka volost	Кетрисановская волость	Ketrisanovka
Kompaneevka volost	Компанеевская волость	Kompaneevka
Konstantinovka volost	Константиновская волость	Konstantinovka
Lipnyazhka volost	Липняжская волость	Lipnyazhka
Lozovatka volost	Лозоватская волость	Lozovatka
Lysaya-Gora volost	Лысогорская волость	Lysaya-Gora
Lyubomirka volost	Любомирская волость	Lyubomirka
Malaya Vyska volost	Мало-Высковская волость	Malaya Vyska
Martonosha volost	Мартоношская волость	Martonosha
Nadlak volost	Надлакская волость	Nadlak
Nechaevo volost	Нечаевская волость	Nechaevo
Novo-Arkhangelsk volost	Ново-Архангельская волость	Novo-Arkhangelsk
Novo-Mirgorod volost	Ново-Миргородская волость	Novo-Mirgorod
Oboznovka volost	Обозновская волость	Oboznovka
Olgopol volost	Ольгопольская волость	Olgopol
Olshanka volost	Ольшанкаская волость	Olshanka
Pavlovsk volost	Павловская волость	Pavlovsk
Panchevsk volost	Панчевская волость	Panchevsk
Peschanyi Brod volost	Песчано-Бродская волость	Peschanyi Brod
Pletenyi Tashlyk volost	Плетено-Ташлыкская волость	Pletenyi Tashlyk
Rovnoe volost	Ровенская волость	Rovnoe
Semenastoe volost	Семенастовская волость	Sememastoe
Tatarka volost	Татарская волость	Tatarka
Tishkovka volost	Тишковская волость	Tishkovka
Trikraty volost	Трикратская волость	Trikraty
Ustinovka volost	Устиновская волость	Ustinovka
Khmelevoe volost	Хмѣлевская волость	Khmelevoe
Shcherbani volost	Щербановская волость	Shcherbani
Erdelevka volost	Эрделевская волость	Erdelevka

== Demographics ==
At the time of the Russian Empire Census on 28 January [O.S. 15 January] 1897, the Elisavetgrad uezd had a population of 613,283, including 309,089 men and 304,194 women. The majority of the population indicated Little Russian (Note: Prior to 1918, the Imperial Russian government classified Russians as the Great Russians, Ukrainians as the Little Russians, and Belarusians as the White Russians. After the creation of the Ukrainian People's Republic in 1918, the Little Russians identified themselves as "Ukrainian". Also, the Belarusian Democratic Republic which the White Russians identified themselves as "Belarusian".) to be their mother tongue, with significant Great Russian, Jewish and Romanian speaking minorities.

Linguistic composition of the Elisavetgrad uezd in 1897
Language	Native speakers	Percentage
Little Russian	405,546	66.13
Great Russian	93,381	15.23
Jewish	57,581	9.39
Romanian	36,819	6.00
White Russian	5,842	0.95
German	5,445	0.89
Bulgarian	4,608	0.75
Polish	2,620	0.43
Gipsy	433	0.07
Tatar	363	0.06
Greek	148	0.02
Czech	89	0.01
Turkish	61	0.01
Latvian	49	0.01
French	34	0.01
Armenian	23	0.00
English	21	0.00
Italian	15	0.00
South Slavic	14	0.00
Mordovian	9	0.00
Swedish	8	0.00
Lithuanian	7	0.00
Georgian	3	0.00
Estonian	1	0.00
Others	163	0.03
Total	613,283	100.00
