= Shyriaieve settlement hromada =

Coordinates: 47°23′16″N 30°11′28″E

Shyriaieve settlement hromada Ширяївська селищна громада
- Hromada
- Interactive map of Shyriaieve settlement hromada
- Country: Ukraine
- Oblast: Odesa Oblast
- Raion: Berezivka Raion
- Admin. center: Shyriaieve

Area
  - Total: 410.5 km^{2} (158.5 sq mi)

Population (2020)
  - Total: 17,409
  - Density: 42.41/km^{2} (109.8/sq mi)
- CATOTTG code: UA51020310000020019
- Settlements: 12
- Rural settlements: 1
- Villages: 11

Shyriaieve settlement hromada (Ukrainian: Ширяївська селищна громада) is a hromada in Berezivka Raion of Odesa Oblast in southwestern Ukraine. Population: 17,409 (2020 est.)

The hromada consists of a rural settlement of Shyriaieve and 11 villages:

- Makarove
- Maryanivka
- Novohuliaivka
- Odai
- Oleksandro-Vovkove
- Osynivka
- Podiltsi
- Sukha Zhurivka
- Vynohradivka
- Yarynoslavka
- Yosypivka

== Links ==
- Ширяївська селищна ОТГ // Облікова картка на офіційному вебсайті Верховної Ради України.
- http://gromada.info/gromada/shiryaivska/
- http://decentralization.gov.ua/region/common/id/1292#tab2
