= Petrovirivka rural hromada =

Coordinates: 47°13′N 30°20′E

Petrovirivka rural hromada Петровірівська сільська громада
- Hromada
- Interactive map of Petrovirivka rural hromada
- Country: Ukraine
- Oblast: Odesa Oblast
- Raion: Berezivka Raion
- Admin. center: Petrovirivka

Area
  - Total: 292.4 km^{2} (112.9 sq mi)

Population (2020)
  - Total: 4,890
  - Density: 16.7/km^{2} (43.3/sq mi)
- CATOTTG code: UA51020190000074479
- Settlements: 10
- Villages: 10
- Website: https://petrovirivska-gromada.gov.ua/

Petrovirivka rural hromada (Ukrainian: Петровірівська сільська громада) is a hromada in Berezivka Raion of Odesa Oblast in southwestern Ukraine. Population: 4,890 (2020 est.)

The hromada consists of 10 villages:

- Armashivka
- Berdynove
- Kostiantyniv
- Kryzhanivka
- Novosvitivka
- Petrovirivka (seat of administration)
- Poliove
- Revova
- Rozkishne
- Zhukovske

== Links ==
- Офіційний сайт громади
- Петровірівська сільська громада
- https://dair.odessa.gov.ua/info/novini1/v-odeskj-oblast-triva-proces-utvorennya-otg/
