= Verkhnedneprovsk uezd =

Verkhnedneprovsk uezd Верхнеднѣпровскій уѣздъ
- Uezd
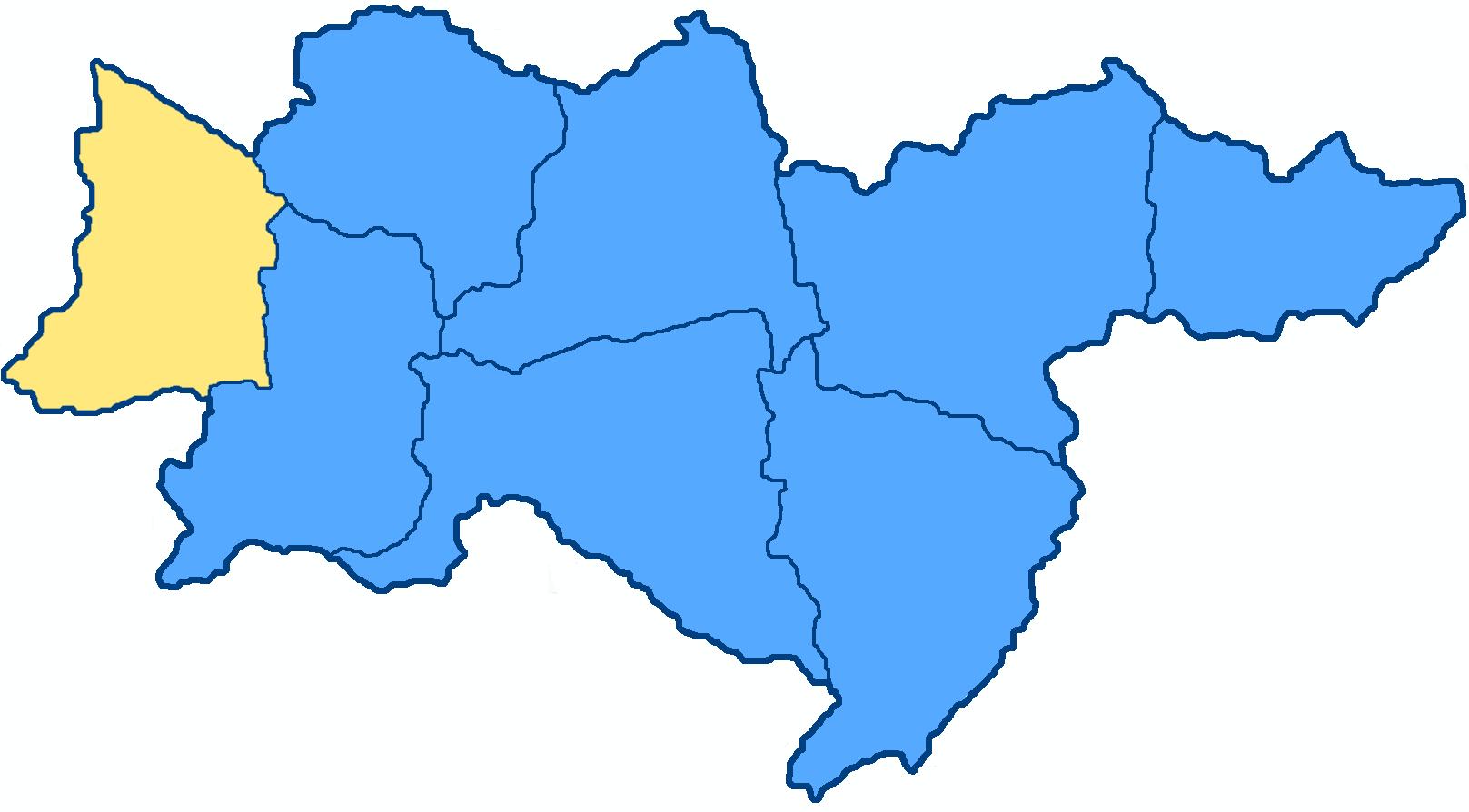
- Location in the Yekaterinoslav Governorate
- Country: Russian Empire
- Governorate: Yekaterinoslav
- Established: 1805
- Abolished: 7 March 1923
- Capital: Verkhnedneprovsk

Area
  - Total: 7,015.35 km^{2} (2,708.64 sq mi)

Population (1897)
  - Total: 211,674
  - Density: 30.1730/km^{2} (78.1477/sq mi)

The Verkhnedneprovsk uezd (Russian: Верхнеднѣпровскій уѣздъ, romanized: Verkhnedneprovskiy uyezd; Ukrainian: Верхнодніпровський повіт, romanized: Verkhnodniprovs'kyi povit) was one of the subdivisions of the Yekaterinoslav Governorate of the Russian Empire. It was situated in the western part of the governorate. Its administrative centre was Verkhnodniprovsk (Verkhnedneprovsk).

== Demographics ==
At the time of the Russian Empire Census of 1897, Verkhnedneprovsky Uyezd had a population of 211,674. Of these, 90.3% spoke Ukrainian, 4.7% Russian, 2.6% Yiddish, 2.1% German, 0.1% Belarusian and 0.1% Polish as their native language.
