= Tiraspol uezd =

Tiraspol uezd Тираспольскій уѣздъ
- Uezd
- Coat of arms

- Location in the Kherson Governorate
- Country: Russian Empire
- Governorate: Kherson
- Established: 1803
- Abolished: 1923
- Capital: Tiraspol

Area
  - Total: 7,228.97 km^{2} (2,791.12 sq mi)

Population (1897)
  - Total: 206,568
  - Density: 28.5750/km^{2} (74.0090/sq mi)
  - Urban: 21.37%
  - Rural: 78.63%

The Tiraspol uezd (Note: Russian: Тира́спольскій уѣ́здъ, romanized: Tiráspolʼskiy uyézd; Ukrainian: Тира́спольський пові́т, romanized: Tyráspolʼsʼkyi povít; Moldovan Cyrillic: Цинутул Тираспол, romanized: Ținutul Tiraspol) was a county (uezd) of the Kherson Governorate of the Russian Empire. The uezd bordered the Balta uezd of the Podolia Governorate to the north, the Ananev uezd to the east, the Odessa uezd to the south, and the Akkerman and Bendery uezd of the Bessarabia Governorate to the west. The administrative centre of the county was Tiraspol. Today, the historic territory of Tiraspol uezd is split between Odesa Oblast in Ukraine, and the breakaway territory of Transnistria, which is a part of Moldova.

== Administrative divisions ==
The subcounties (volosts) of the Tiraspol uezd in 1912 were as follows:

Name	Name in Russian	Capital
Glikstal volost	Гликстальская волость	Glikstal
Gofnungstal volost	Гофнунгстальская волость	Tsebrikova
Demidovka volost	Демидовская волость	Demidovka
Dubovoe volost	Дубовская волость	Dubovoe
Evgenievka volost	Евгеніевская волость	Evgenievka
Zakharevka volost	Захарьевская волость	Zakharevka
Kassel volost	Кассельская волость	Kassel
Katarzhina volost	Катаржинская волость	Katarzhina
Korotkoe volost	Коротнянская волость	Korotkoe
Lunga volost	Лунговская волость	Lunga
Malaeshty 1-oe volost	Малаештская 1-ая волость	Malaeshty 1-oe
Malaeshty 2-oe volost	Малаештская 2-ая волость	Malaeshty 2-oe
Maligonova volost	Малигоновская волость	Maligonova
Novo-Petrovka volost	Ново-Петровская волость	Mikhailovka
Parkany volost	Парканская волость	Parkany
Petroverovka volost	Петровѣровская волость	Petroverovka
Ploskaya volost	Плосковская волость	Ploskaya
Ponyatovka volost	Понятовская волость	Ponyatovka
Rossiyanka volost	Россіяновская волость	Rossiyanka
Slobodzeya volost	Слободзейская волость	Slobodzeya
Tashlyk volost	Ташлыкская волость	Tashlyk

== Demographics ==
At the time of the Russian Empire Census on 28 January [O.S. 15 January] 1897, the Tiraspol uezd had a population of 240,145, including 123,218 men and 116,927 women. The majority of the population indicated Little Russian (Note: Prior to 1918, the Imperial Russian government classified Russians as the Great Russians, Ukrainians as the Little Russians, and Belarusians as the White Russians. After the creation of the Ukrainian People's Republic in 1918, the Little Russians identified themselves as "Ukrainian". Also, the Belarusian Democratic Republic which the White Russians identified themselves as "Belarusian".) to be their mother tongue, with significant Romanian, Great Russian, Jewish, and German speaking minorities.

Linguistic composition of the Tiraspol uezd in 1897
Language	Native speakers	Percentage
Ukrainian language	80,049	33.33
Romanian	59,794	24.90
Great Russian	40,703	16.95
Jewish	23,811	9.92
German	23,527	9.80
Bulgarian	8,801	3.66
Polish	1,907	0.79
Armenian	475	0.20
White Russian	352	0.15
Gipsy	261	0.11
Tatar	138	0.06
Greek	106	0.04
Czech	76	0.03
Mordovian	34	0.01
Italian	18	0.01
Latvian	15	0.01
French	13	0.01
South Slavic	11	0.00
Lithuanian	10	0.00
Estonian	9	0.00
Georgian	3	0.00
Turkish	3	0.00
Swedish	2	0.00
English	1	0.00
Others	66	0.03
Total	240,145	100.00
