= Kherson Governorate =

1803–1920 administrative unit

Coordinates: 46.6333°N 32.6000°E

Nikolayev Governorate (1802-1803) Kherson Governorate (1803-1920) Mykolaiv Governorate (1920-1922)
- Governorate
- 1803–1922
- Coat of arms

- Location in the Russian Empire
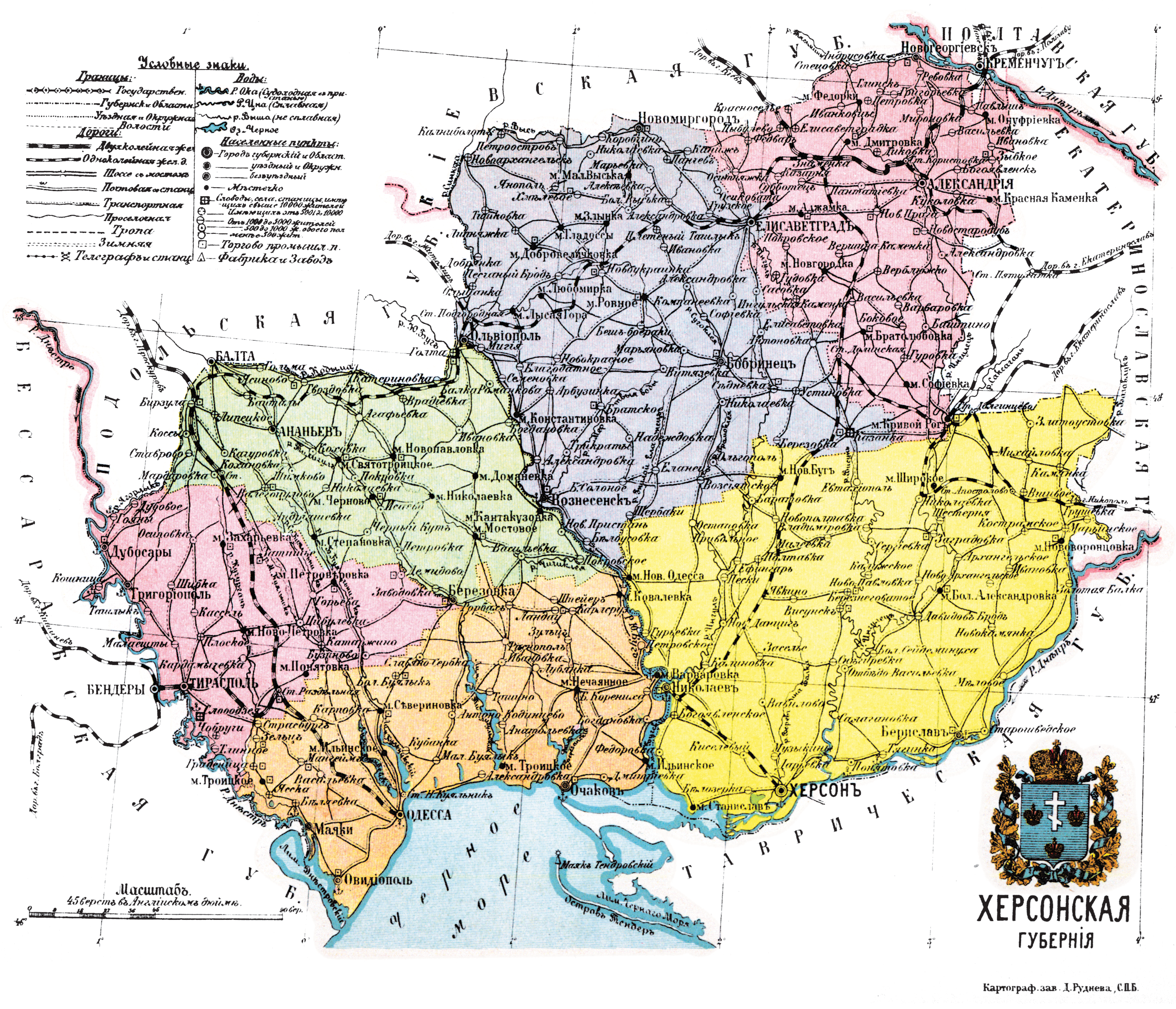
- Map of Kherson province, 1913
- Capital: Nikolayev (1802-1803); Kherson (1803-1920); Mykolaiv (1920-1922)
- Area
  - (1897): 71,936 km^{2} (27,775 sq mi)
- Population
  - (1897): 2,733,612
- History
  - Established: 1803
  - Abolished: 1922
Preceded by	Succeeded by
Newrussia Governorate; Taurida Governorate	Odessa Governorate

Kherson Governorate, (Note: Russian: Херсо́нская губе́рния, pre-1918: Херсо́нская губе́рнія, romanized: Khersónskaya gubérniya; Ukrainian: Херсо́нська губе́рнія, romanized: Khersónsʼka hubérniia) known until 1803 as Nikolayev Governorate, (Note: Russian: Никола́евская губе́рнія, romanized: Nikoláyevskaya gubérniya; Ukrainian: Микола́ївська губе́рнія, romanized: Mykoláïvsʼka hubérniia) was an administrative-territorial unit (guberniya) of the Russian Empire, with its capital in Kherson. It encompassed 71,936 square kilometres (27,775 mi^{2}) in area and had a population of 2,733,612 inhabitants. At the time of the census in 1897, it bordered Podolia Governorate to the northwest, Kiev Governorate to the north, Poltava Governorate to the northeast, Yekaterinoslav Governorate to the east, Taurida Governorate to the southeast, Black Sea to the south, and Bessarabia Governorate to the west. It roughly corresponds to what is now most of Mykolaiv, Kirovohrad and Odesa Oblasts, as well as parts of Kherson and Dnipropetrovsk Oblasts of Ukraine.

The economy of the governorate was mainly based on agriculture. During the grain harvest, thousands of agricultural laborers from the parts of the Empire found work in the area. The industrial part of the economy, consisting primarily of flour milling, distilling, metalworking industry, iron mining, beet-sugar processing, and brick industry, was underdeveloped.

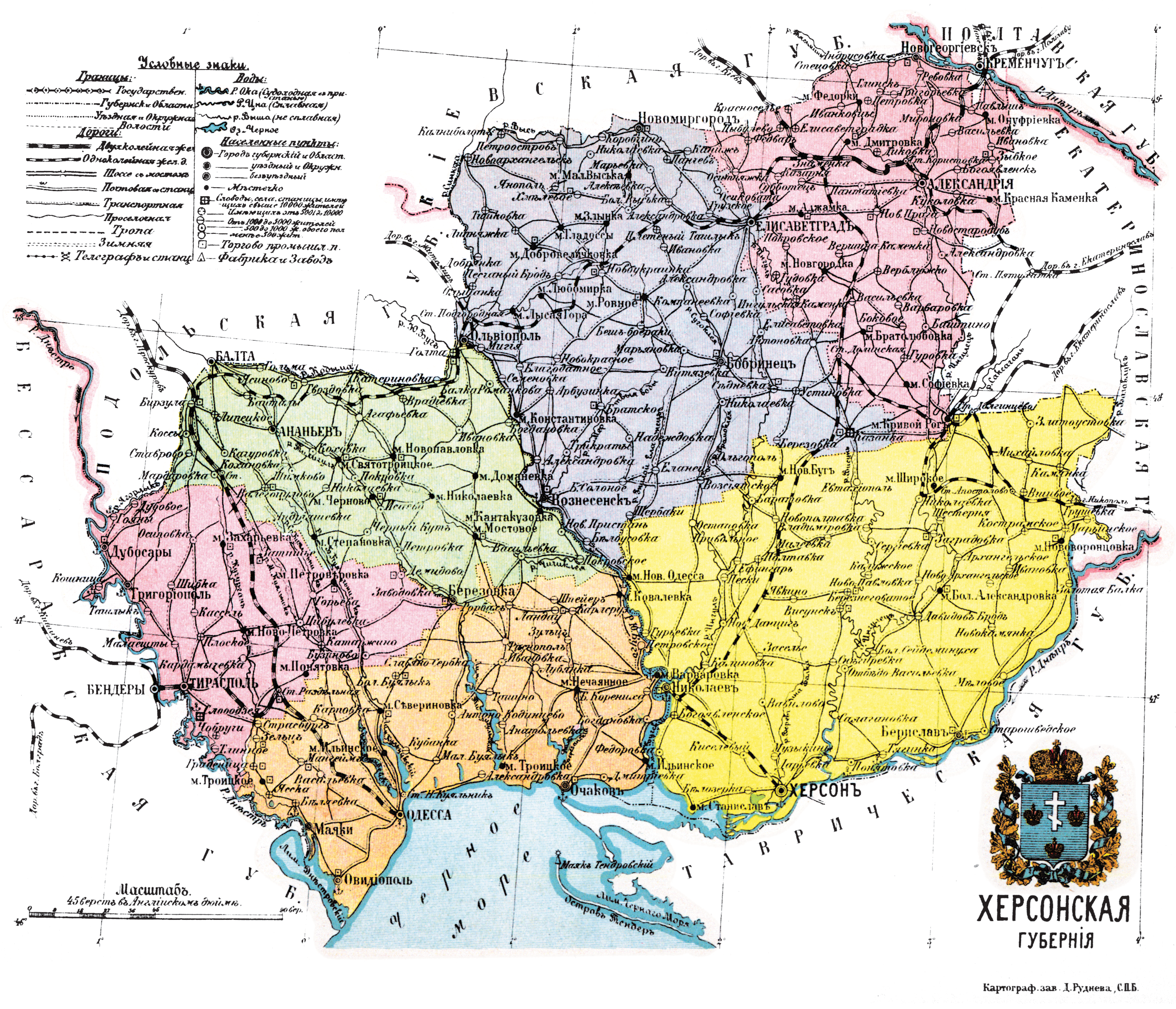
Map of Kherson province, 1913

== Administrative divisions ==
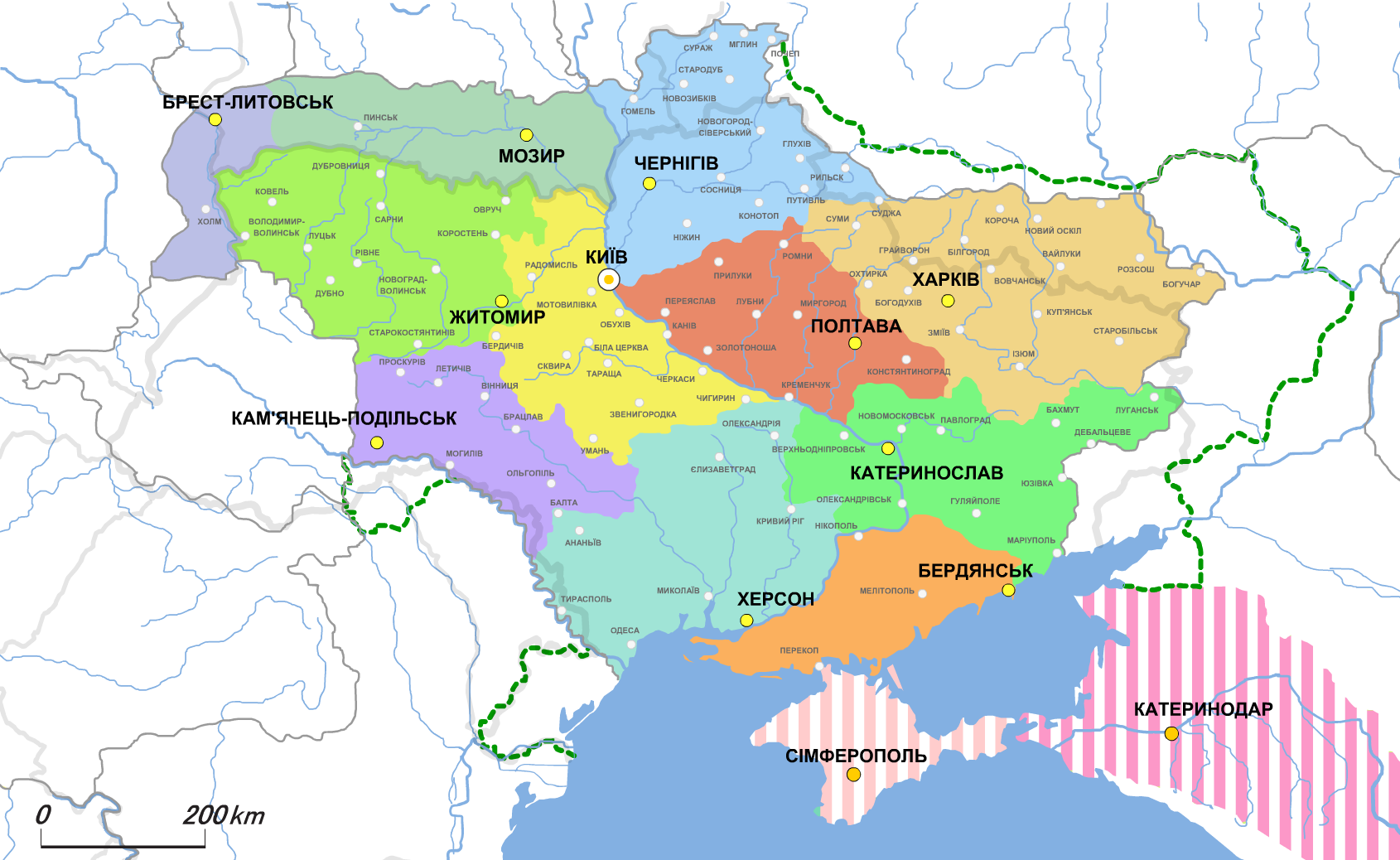
Kherson Governorate (light blue) in the Ukrainian State (1918)

The governorate bordered Bessarabia Governorate to the west, with Kiev and Poltava Governorates to the north, to the east was Yekaterinoslav Governorate, and southward was Taurida Governorate.

From 1809, the governorate consisted of five uyezds: Khersonsky Uyezd, Aleksandriysky Uyezd, Ovidiopol, Tiraspolsky Uyezd, and Yelisavetgradsky Uyezd. The city of Odessa was separate, as it carried a special status. In 1825, Odessky Uyezd and in 1834, Ananyevsky Uyezd were added into the territorial division of the Kherson Governorate. A seventh uyezd – Bobrynets, existed from 1828 to 1865. The cities of Odessa and Nikolayev (in 1803–1861) and their surrounding vicinity were governed separately: Odessa by a gradonachalnik (Russian: градоначальник), answerable directly to the tsar and (from 1822) the governor-general of Novorossiya and Bessarabia, and Nikolayev by a military governor.

In 1920, while being under Bolshevik rule, the governorate's territory, 70,600 km^{2} (27,259 sq mi), was divided to form the newer Odessa Governorate. Kherson Governorate was renamed as Mykolaiv Governorate in 1921, and in 1922 – it was merged with Odessa Governorate. In 1925, Odessa Governorate was abolished, and its territory was divided into six okruhas: Kherson, Kryvyi Rih, Mykolaiv, Odesa, Pershotravneve, and Zinoviivske. In 1932, much of this territory was incorporated into the new Odesa Oblast, an administrative division of Ukrainian SSR, which was divided to form Mykolaiv Oblast.

County		Capital	Arms of capital	Area	Population (1897 census)
Transliteration name	Russian Cyrillic	Capital	Arms of capital	Area	Population (1897 census)
Aleksandriysky	Александрійскій	Aleksandriya		11,165 km^{2} (4,311 mi^{2})	327,199
Ananyevsky	Ананьевскій	Ananev		10,289.2 km^{2} (3,972.7 mi^{2})	187,226
Yelisavetgradsky	Елисаветградскій	Yelisavetgrad		15,866.8 km^{2} (6,126.2 mi^{2})	507,660
Odessky	Одесскій	Odessa		10,552.1 km^{2} (4,074.2 mi^{2})	532,729
Tiraspolsky	Тираспольскій	Tiraspol		7,228.9 km^{2} (2,791.1 mi^{2})	206,568
Khersonsky	Херсонскій	Kherson		19,553 km^{2} (7,549 mi^{2})	532,956
Nikolayev War Governorate	Николаевское воѣнное губернаторство	Nikolayev		197.3 km^{2} (76.2 mi^{2})	92,000

== Principal cities ==
From the Russian Census of 1897

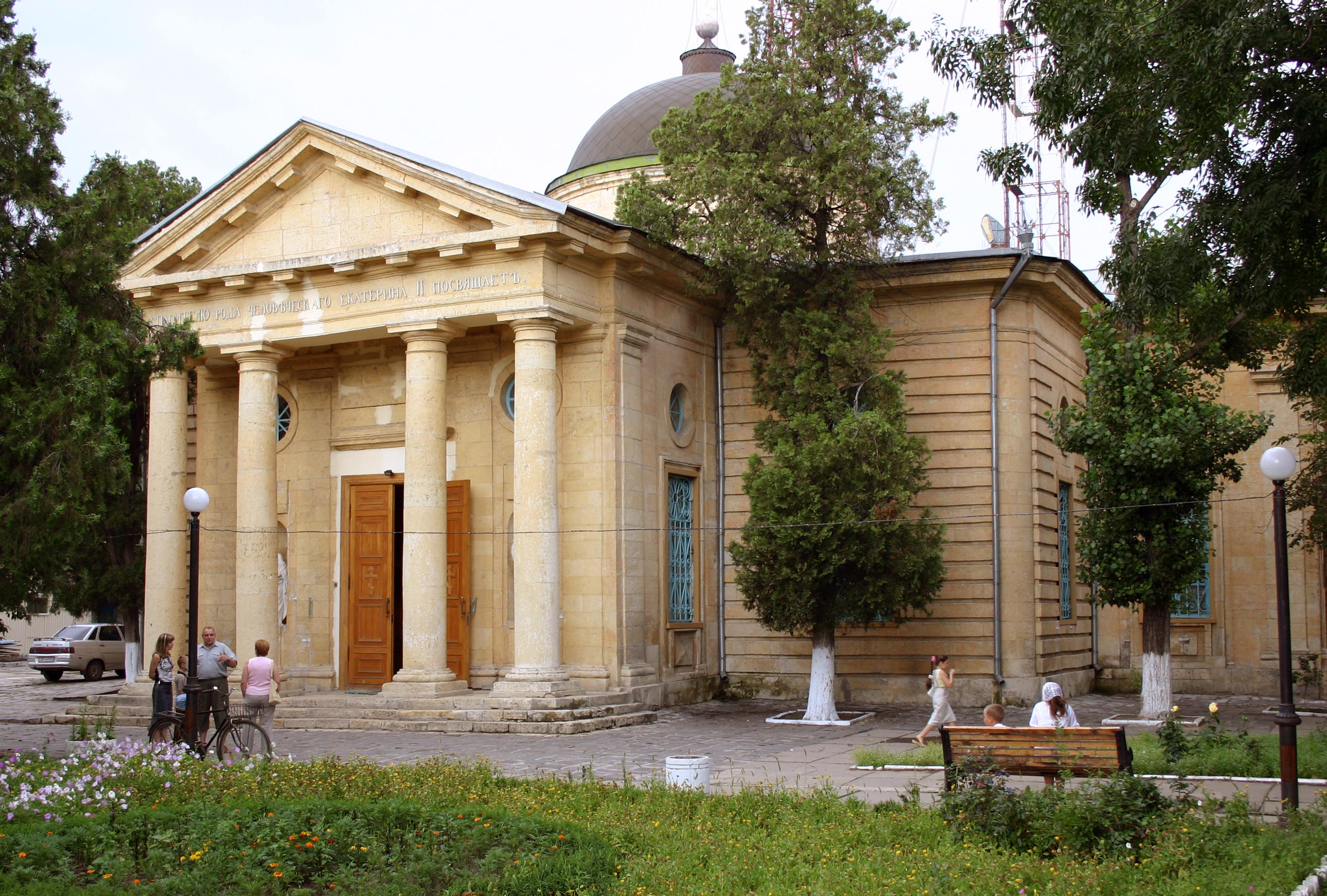
Cathedral dedicated to Saint Catherine (Russian: Свято-Екаерининский Собор) in Kherson that was the governorate's seat at the tim

- Odessa – 403,815 (Russian – 198,233, Jewish – 124,511, Ukrainian – 37,925)
- Nikolayev – 92,012 (Russian – 61,023, Jewish – 17,949, Ukrainian – 7,780)
- Yelizavetgrad – 61,488 (Jewish – 23,256, Russian – 21,301, Ukrainian – 14,523)
- Kherson – 59,076 (Russian – 27,902, Jewish – 17,162, Ukrainian – 11,591)
- Tiraspol – 31,616 (Russian – 14,013, Jewish – 8,568, Ukrainian – 3,708)
- Ananiv – 16,684 (Ukrainian – 7,205, Romanian – 4,174, Jewish – 3,514)
- Voznesensk – 15,748 (Jewish – 5,879, Ukrainian – 5,644, Russian – 2,583)
- Bobrinets – 14,281 (Ukrainian – 9,529, Jewish – 3,464, Russian – 837)
- Aleksandriya – 14,007 (Ukrainian – 7,658, Jewish – 3,687, Russian – 2,364)
- Beryslav – 12,149 (Ukrainian – 8,852, Jewish – 2,639, Russian – 524)
- Dubossary – 12,089 (Jewish – 5,326, Romanian – 3,383, Ukrainian – 2,841)
- Novogeorgiyevsk – 11,594 (Russian – 6,631, Ukrainian – 3,372, Jewish – 1,424)
- Ochakov – 10,786 (Ukrainian – 5,204, Russian – 3,508, Jewish – 1,430)
- Novomirgorod – 9,364 (Russian – 7,025, Jewish – 1,617, Ukrainian – 572)
- Grigoriopol – 7,605 (Romanian – 3,740, Russian – 1,832, Jewish – 832)
- Olviopol – 6,884 (Ukrainian – 5,022, Jewish – 1,480, Russian – 271)
- Ovidiopol – 5,187 (Ukrainian – 2,785, Russian – 1,997, Jewish – 387)
- Maiaky – 4,575 (Russian – 2,865, Ukrainian – 944, Jewish – 644)

== Demographics ==
Until 1858, a third of the population (military settlers, admiralty settlements, foreign colonists, etc.) was subject to martial law. The gubernia had a population of about 245,000 in 1812; 893,000 in 1851; 1,330,000 in 1863; 2,027,000 in 1885; 2,733,600 in 1897; and 3,744,600 in 1914. In the 1850s it consisted of Ukrainians (68–75 %), Romanians (8–11 %), Russians (3–7 %), Jews (6 %), Germans (4 %), Bulgarians (2 %), Poles, Greeks, and Gypsies. In 1914, Ukrainians composed only 53% of the population, while Russians made up 22% and Jews – 12%. Urban dwellers made up 10 to 20 percent of the population until the 1850s, after which the proportion of urban dwellers increased, to about 30% in 1897. Migration within the Russian Empire mainly accounted for the area's population growth, with 46% of the population born outside of the governorate in 1897.

=== Russian Empire Census ===
According to the Russian Empire Census on 28 January [O.S. 16 January] 1897, the Kherson Governorate had a population of 2,733,612, including 1,400,981 men and 1,332,631 women. The majority of the population indicated Little Russian (Note: Prior to 1918, the Imperial Russian Government classified Russians as the Great Russians, Ukrainians as the Little Russians, and Belarusians as the White Russians. After the creation of the Ukrainian People's Republic in 1917 and the Belarusian Democratic Republic in 1918, the Little Russians and the White Russians identified themselves as "Ukrainians" and "Belarusians" respectively.) to be their mother tongue, with significant Russian, Jewish, Romanian, and German speaking minorities.

Linguistic composition of the Kherson Governorate in 1897
Language	Native speakers	Percentage
Little Russian	1,462,039	53.48
Great Russian	575,375	21.05
Jewish	322,537	11.80
Romanian	147,218	5.39
German	123,453	4.52
Polish	30,894	1.13
Bulgarian	25,685	0.94
White Russian	22,958	0.84
Greek	8,257	0.30
Tatar	3,152	0.12
Armenian	2,070	0.08
Roma	1,671	0.06
French	1,353	0.05
Czech	1,351	0.05
Italian	834	0.03
Swedish	662	0.02
Latvian	619	0.02
Turkish	508	0.02
Lithuanian	478	0.01
English	475	0.01
Estonian	303	0.01
Georgian	201	0.01
Mordavian	170	0.01
Other languages	919	0.03
TOTAL	2,733,612	100.00

Religious composition of the Kherson Governorate in 1897
Faith	Male	Female	Both	
Faith	Male	Female	Number	Percentage
Eastern Orthodox	1,123,860	1,067,219	2,191,079	80.15
Judaism	168,425	171,485	339,910	12.43
Roman Catholic	53,140	42,087	95,227	3.48
Lutheran	29,229	27,328	56,557	2.07
Old Believer	13,923	14,131	28,054	1.03
Baptist	2,719	2,696	5,415	0.20
Mennonite	2,734	2,652	5,386	0.20
Reformed	2,507	2,503	5,010	0.18
Muslim	1,964	403	2,367	0.09
Armenian Apostolic	1,307	905	2,212	0.08
Karaite	954	1,054	2,008	0.07
Anglican	80	83	163	0.01
Armenian Catholic	59	19	78	0.00
Buddhist	13	11	24	0.00
Other Christian denomination	64	55	119	0.00
Other non-Christian denomination	3	0	3	0.00
Total	1,400,981	1,332,631	2,733,612	100.00
