= Ananyevsky uezd =

Ananev uezd Ананьевский уезд
- Uezd
- Location in the Kherson Governorate
- Country: Russian Empire
- Governorate: Kherson
- Established: 1834
- Abolished: 1921
- Capital: Ananev

Area
  - Total: 9,041 km^{2} (3,491 sq mi)

Population (1897)
  - Total: 187,226
  - Density: 20.71/km^{2} (53.63/sq mi)

The Ananyevsky uezd (Russian: Ананьевский уезд, romanized: Anan'yevskiy uyezd; Ukrainian: Ананьївський повіт, romanized: Anan'ivs'kyi povit), located in modern-day Ukraine, was one of the subdivisions of the Kherson Governorate of the Russian Empire. It was situated in the southwestern part of the governorate. Its administrative centre was Ananiv (Ananyev).

== Demographics ==
At the time of the Russian Empire Census of 1897, Ananyevsky Uyezd had a population of 265,762. Of these, 62.0% spoke Ukrainian, 13.5% Moldovan or Romanian, 11.0% Russian, 8.3% Yiddish, 3.8% German, 0.7% Polish, 0.2% Romani, 0.2% Bulgarian, 0.1% Czech, 0.1% Belarusian and 0.1% Greek as their native language.
