= Zelenohirske, Odesa Oblast =

Rural locality in Odesa Oblast, Ukraine

Zelenohirske Зеленогірське
- Rural settlement
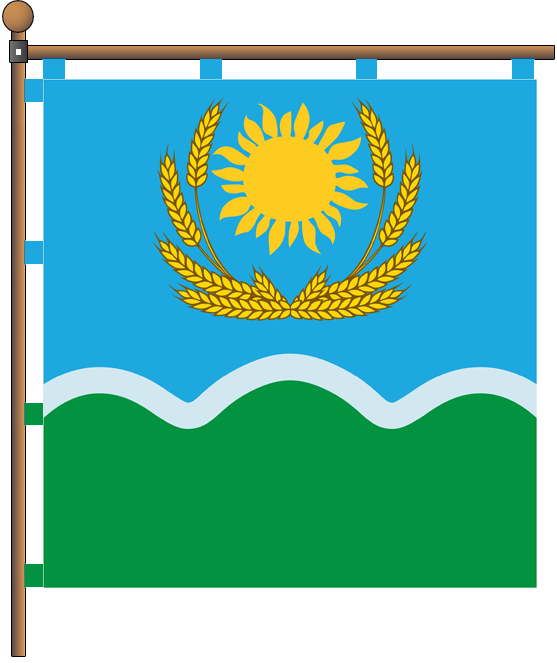
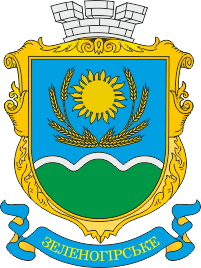
- Flag Coat of arms

- Location within Odesa Oblast Location within Ukraine
- Coordinates: 47°52′30″N 30°05′59″E
- Country: Ukraine
- Oblast: Odesa Oblast
- Raion: Podilsk Raion
- Hromada: Zelenohirske settlement hromada

Population (2022)
  - Total: 1,417
- Time zone: UTC+2 (EET)
  - Summer (DST): UTC+3 (EEST)

Zelenohirske (Ukrainian: Зеленогірське, Russian: Зеленогорское) is a rural settlement in Podilsk Raion of Odesa Oblast in Ukraine. It is located on the right bank of the Kodyma, a tributary of the Southern Buh. Zelenohirske hosts the administration of Zelenohirske settlement hromada, one of the hromadas of Ukraine. Population: 1,417 (2022 estimate)

== History ==
Until 18 July 2020, Zelenohirske belonged to Liubashivka Raion. The raion was abolished in July 2020 as part of the administrative reform of Ukraine, which reduced the number of raions of Odesa Oblast to seven. The area of Liubashivka Raion was merged into Podilsk Raion.

Until 26 January 2024, Zelenohirske was designated urban-type settlement. On this day, a new law entered into force which abolished this status, and Zelenohirske became a rural settlement.

== Economy ==
=== Transportation ===
The closest railway station, approximately 3 kilometres (1.9 mi) southwest, is Zaplazy on the railway connecting Podilsk and Pervomaisk. There is infrequent passenger traffic.

The settlement has road connections with Balta and, via Kryve Ozero, with Pervomaisk.

== Demographics ==
As of Ukraine's most recent census, the settlement had a population of 1,789 people. The population was almost completely Ukrainian-speaking. The exact native language composition according to the 2001 Ukrainian census was as follows:

Native languages in Zelenohirske
	percent
Ukrainian	94.5%
Russian	3.8%
Moldovan	1.6%
Belarusian	0.1%
others	0.1%

== Notable people ==
- Ruslan Riaboshapka (born 1976), Ukrainian jurist, who served as the Prosecutor General of Ukraine between 2019 and 2020
