= Troitske, Podilsk Raion, Odesa Oblast =

Rural locality in Odesa Oblast, Ukraine

Trotske Троїцьке
- Village
- St. Trinity Church

- Location of Troitske in Odesa Oblast Trotske (Ukraine)
- Coordinates: 47°38′12″N 30°16′35″E
- Country: Ukraine
- Oblast: Odesa Oblast
- Raion: Podilsk Raion
- Hromada: Liubashivka settlement hromada
- Founded: 18th century

Area
  - Total: 4.06 km^{2} (1.57 sq mi)
- Elevation: 52 m (171 ft)

Population (2001)
  - Total: 2,311
  - Density: 569/km^{2} (1,470/sq mi)
- Time zone: UTC+2 (EET)
  - Summer (DST): UTC+3 (EEST)
- Postal code: 66560
- Area code: +380 4864
- Climate: Dfa

Troitske (Ukrainian: Троїцьке) is a village (a selo) in Podilsk Raion (district) of Odesa Oblast in southern Ukraine. It belongs to Liubashivka settlement hromada, one of the hromadas of Ukraine.

== History ==
In 1898, Princess E. P. Gika donated a plot of land for the construction of a hospital in Troitske. By a resolution of the Ananyev district zemstvo assembly, the land was assigned to the Ananyev zemstvo. In the fall of 1900, the construction of the hospital was completed.

During the Holodomor, Troitske was listed on the "black board". The names of 2 victims who died in the village during the Holodomor organized by the Soviet authorities in 1932–1933 have been identified.

Until 18 July 2020, Troitske belonged to Liubashivka Raion. The raion was abolished in July 2020 as part of the administrative reform of Ukraine, which reduced the number of raions of Odesa Oblast to seven. The area of Liubashivka Raion was merged into Podilsk Raion.

== Demographics ==
According to the 1989 census, the population of Troitske was 2,621 people, of whom 1,181 were men and 1,440 women.

The exact native language composition according to the 2001 Ukrainian census was as follows:

Native languages in Troitske
	percent
Ukrainian	94.60%
Russian	2.77%
Moldovan	2.29%
Armenian	0.17%
Belarusian	0.13%
