= Liubashivka Raion =

Former subdivision of Odesa Oblast, Ukraine

Liubashivka Raion Любашівський район
- Raion
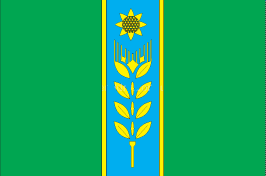
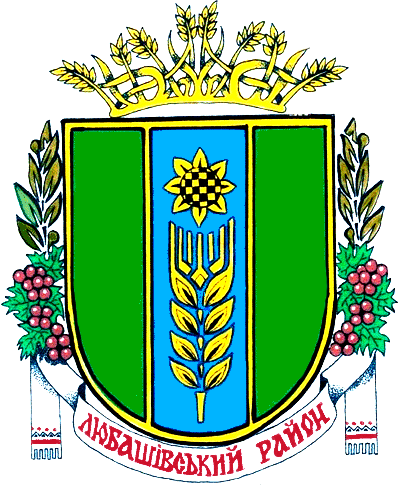
- Flag Coat of arms

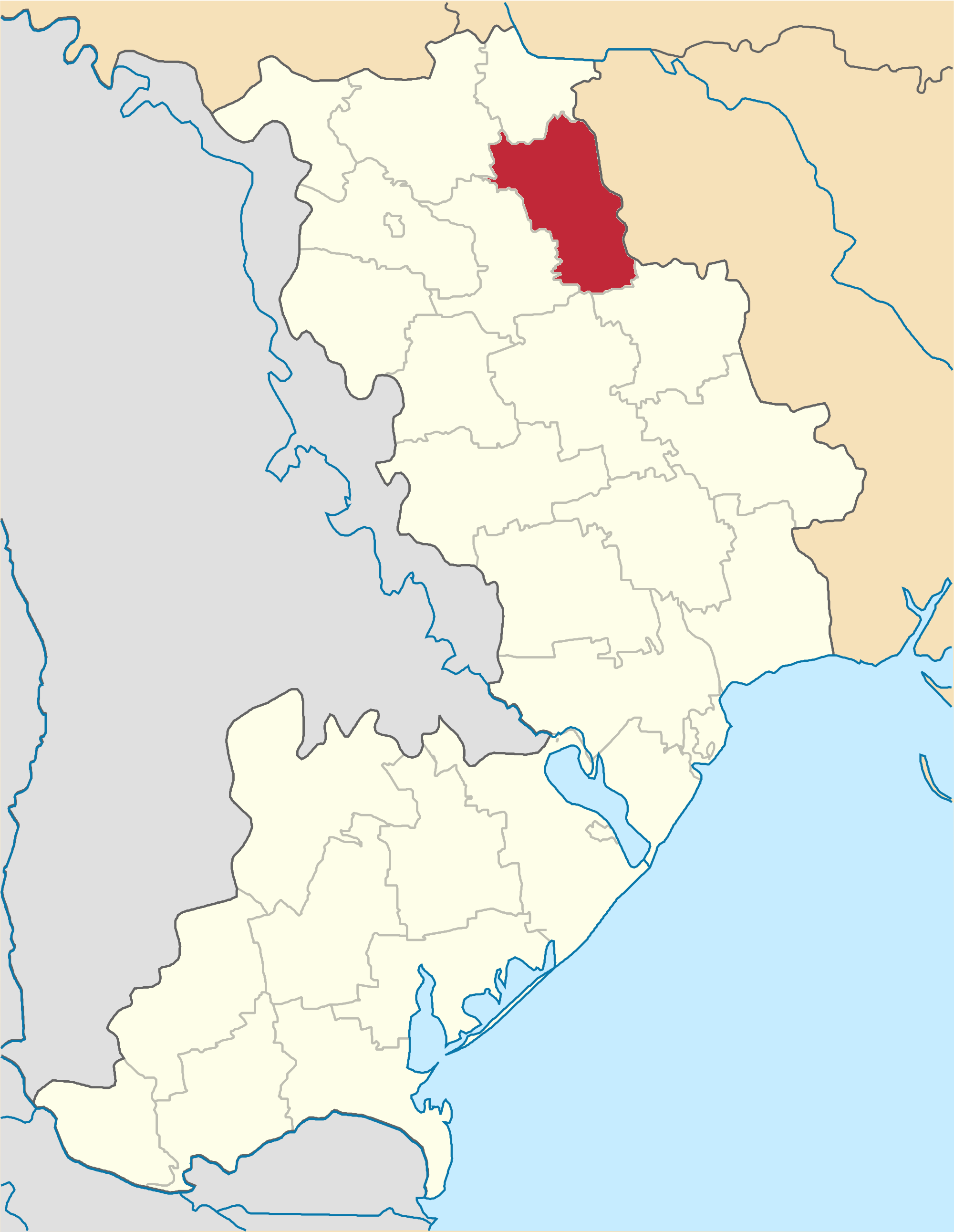
- Coordinates: 47°47′40″N 30°12′18″E
- Country: Ukraine
- Oblast: Odesa Oblast
- Established: 1926/1957
- Disestablished: 18 July 2020
- Admin. center: Liubashivka
- Subdivisions: List: — city councils; — settlement councils; — rural councils; Number of localities: — cities; — urban-type settlements; 54 — villages; — rural settlements

Government
  - Governor: Serhiy Vovk

Area
  - Total: 11 km^{2} (4.2 sq mi)

Population (2020)
  - Total: 29,253
  - Density: 2,700/km^{2} (6,900/sq mi)
- Time zone: UTC+02:00 (EET)
  - Summer (DST): UTC+03:00 (EEST)
- Postal index: 66500
- Area code: 380-04864

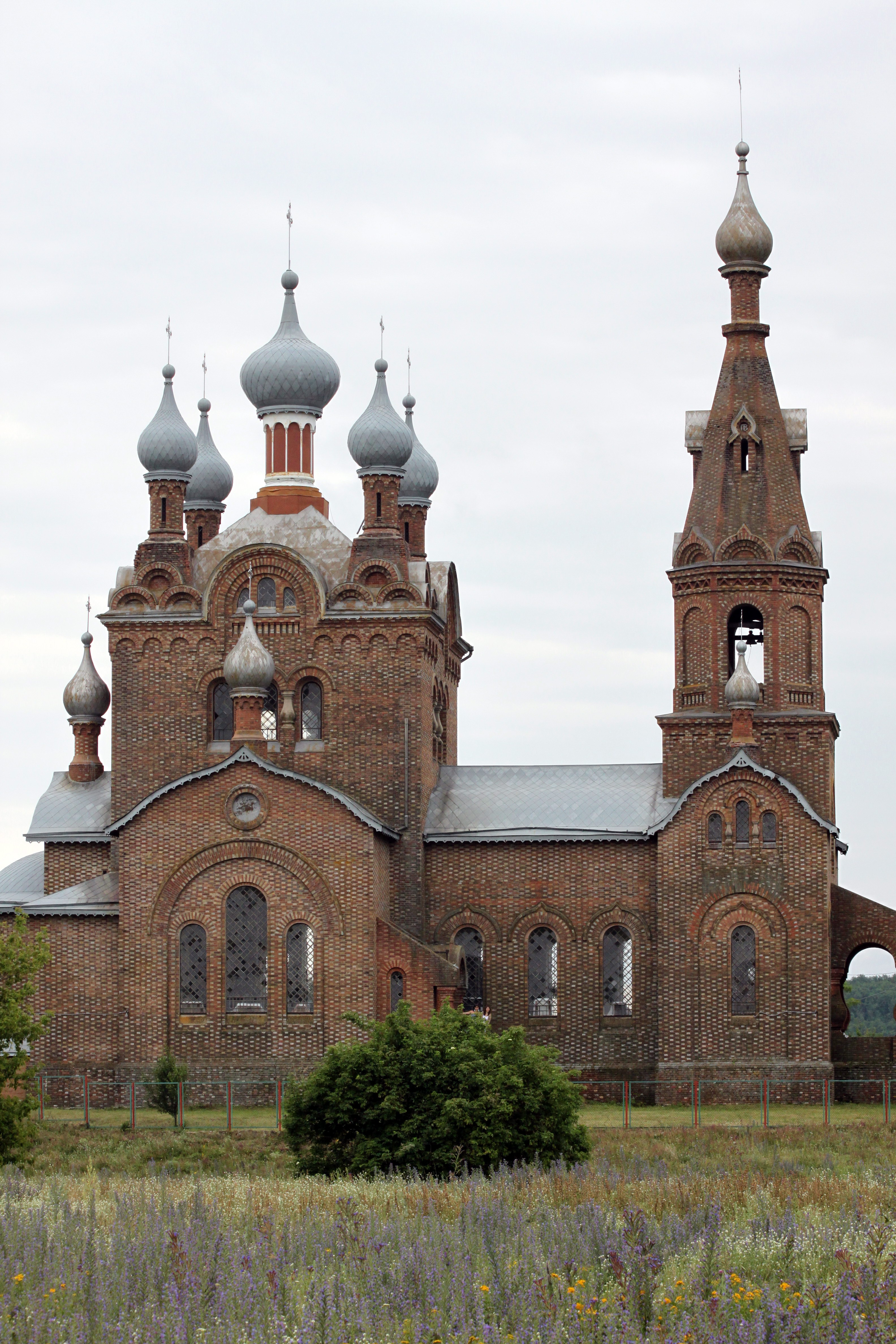
Saint John the Evangelist church in Pokrovka village in Liubashivskyi Raion

Liubashivka Raion was a district in Odesa Oblast, Ukraine. Its administrative center was the urban-type settlement of Liubashivka. In 2001 its population was 33,000. According to the 2001 census, the majority of the population of Liubașivka district spoke Ukrainian (93.13%), with Romanian (3.73%) and Russian (2.69%) speakers in the minority. The raion was abolished on 18 July 2020 as part of the administrative reform of Ukraine, which reduced the number of raions of Odesa Oblast to seven. The area of Liubashivka Raion was merged into Podilsk Raion. The last estimate of the raion population was 29,253 (2020 est.).

At the time of disestablishment, the raion consisted of two hromadas:

- Liubashivka settlement hromada with the administration in Liubashivka;
- Zelenohirske settlement hromada with the administration in the urban-type settlement of Zelenohirske.

The district was primarily Ukrainophone.

Important rivers within Liubashika Raion included the Kodyma and Tylihul Rivers.

The railway connecting Odesa and Kropyvnytskyi crossed the raion. It had two railway stations (in Zaplazy and Liubashivka).

The district also lied on 2 highways — route Kyiv – Odesa M 05 E95; and route Chișinău (Moldova) - Kropyvnytskyi M 13 E577.

== Urban-type settlements ==
- Liubashivka
- Zelenohirske

== Natives ==
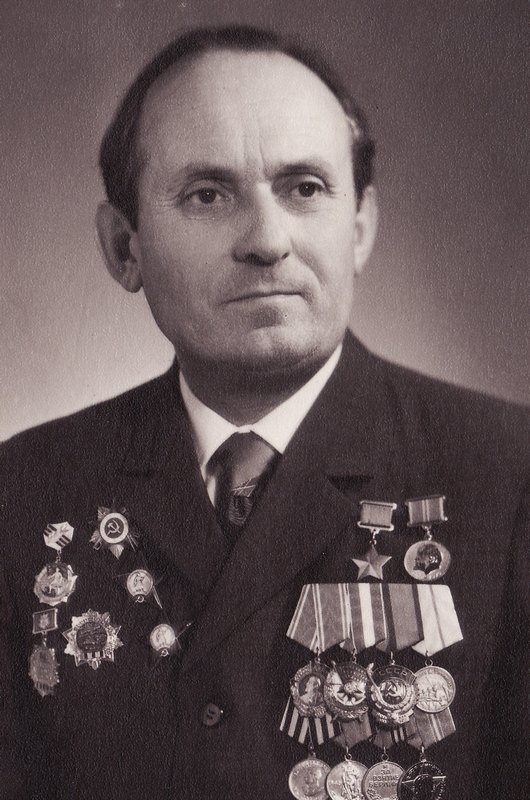
Pavlo Ulitskiy

- Kostyantyn Voloshchuk (1916 — 1945) — Hero of the World War II from Liubashivka.
- Vasil Savenko — opera singer.
- Pavlo Ulitsky (1923 — 1996) — Hero of the World War II.
- Rostyslav Paletsky (1932 — 1978) — artist.
- Аlbin Havdzinsky — artist.
