= Israel Wachser =

Hebrew and Yiddish writer

- ישראל וואקסער
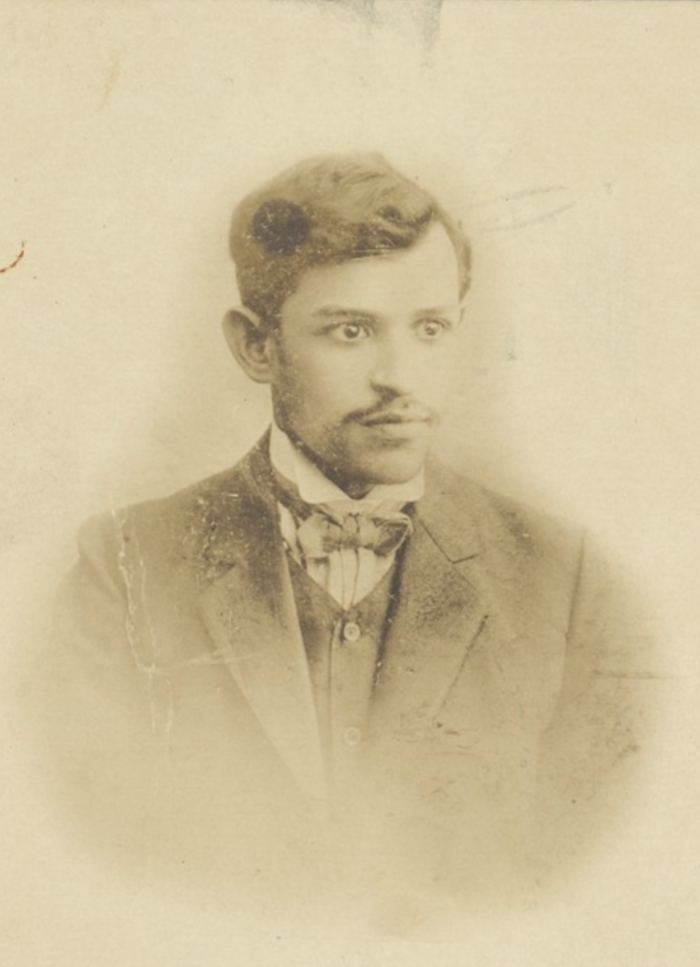
- Born: 1892; Dashiv, Kiev Governorate, Russian Empire
- Died: 24 May 1919 (aged 26–27); Krivozer, Podolian Governorate, Russian Empire
- Writing career
- Language: Yiddish, Hebrew

Israel Wachser (Yiddish: ישראל װאַקסער; 1892 – 24 May 1919) was a Russian writer of Yiddish and Hebrew short stories and children's literature.

== Biography ==
Wachser was born to Aryeh Yehuda-Leib ha-Kohen in Dashiv, Russian Empire. He was educated by his father, who served as rabbi in the town (later in Tulchyn and Pestshan, Podolia), was well-versed in Russian, Hebrew, and Yiddish literature, and occasionally contributed to the Maskilic Hebrew periodicals Ha-Melitz, Ha-Tzfira, and Ha-Pisga.

By the beginning of World War I, Wachser had begun working as a teacher in Kiev, and writing Hebrew and Yiddish poetry and prose. In 1916, he took a teaching position in a school for refugees in Baku, but was forced to flee the city amid the beginning of the Armenian–Azerbaijani War. He hastily destroyed most of his writings before leaving, although his older brother was able to save the remaining part of his work. Wachser spent some time in Odesa before settling in the Podolian town of Krivozer.

Along with several other young Jews, he was killed on 24 May 1919 while defending the local Jewish population from Ukrainian pogromists.

== Work ==
Wachser published only one piece while alive, a Hebrew short story in Ha-mevaser ha-kavkazi (Baku, 1915). He left numerous works in manuscript: the plays On kinder ('Without Children'), Af mesires-nefesh ('Out of Devotion'), and Bay di ibergeblibene ('With the Survivors'), the stories Naftoli der soyfer ('Naftoli the Scribe'), A kindele ('A Small Child'), Der khoyv ('The Debt'), and Der nitsokhn (Victory), the poem "Dos indzele un di yam-tekhter" ('The Island and the Sea-Girl'), and a series of children tales.

After his death, four of his children's stories in Yiddish were published in one collection by Eliezer Steinberg. His brother Menashe Wachser, then the Director of a Hebrew high school in Rishkani, Bessarabia, had two of Wachser's fairy tales published in the third volumes of Rimon and Milgroim in 1923, together with prefaces by Hayim Nahman Bialik. Further publications and translations of Wachser's work would follow.

Collections of manuscripts, correspondences, clippings, and photographs of Wachser are held at the Jewish Theological Seminary and YIVO Archives in New York City.

== Partial bibliography ==
- Fir kinder-mayselekh [Four Children's Tales] (in Yiddish). Jassy: Leyzer Shteynbarg. 1922.
- "Tsvishn knekht" [Among Slaves]. Frayhayt (in Yiddish). Czernowitz. August 1922.
- Mayselekh far kinder [Tales for Children] (in Yiddish). Kishinev: Kultur-lige in Besarabiye. 1923.
- "Rokhele un Paraske" [Rokhele and Paraske]. Tsukunft (in Yiddish). New York. February 1923.
- "Shimele". Tsukunft (in Yiddish). New York. July 1923.
- "In zibn tog arum" [Seven Days from Now]. Milgroim (in Yiddish). 3. Berlin: 33–37. January 1923.
- "Le-shivat ha-yamim" [For the Seven Days]. Rimon (in Hebrew). 3. Berlin: 37–38. January 1923.
- "Di letste trer" [The Last Tear]. Milgroim (in Yiddish). 3. Berlin: 37–39. January 1923.
- "Ha-dim'ah ha-achronah" [The Last Tear]. Rimon (in Hebrew). 3. Berlin: 35–36. January 1923.
- "Dos kluge feygele" [The Smart Little Bird]. Leyenbikher far der Idisher shul (in Yiddish). New York: Ertsyung. 1924. pp. 151–157.
- "Der khoyv". Hadoar. New York: Histadrut Ivrit of America. 1 February 1924.
