= Shkarbynka =

Rural locality in Odesa Oblast, Ukraine

Shkarbynka Шкарби́нка
- Rural-type settlement
- Location within Odesa Oblast Location within Ukraine
- Coordinates: 47°43′59.4″N 30°19′52.7″E
- Country: Ukraine
- Oblast: Odesa Oblast
- Raion: Podilsk Raion
- Hromada: Liubashivka settlement hromada
- Established: 1901

Area
  - Total: 0.389 km^{2} (0.150 sq mi)

Population
  - Total: 61

Shkarbynka is a rural-type settlement in Podilsk Raion, Odesa Oblast, Ukraine. It belongs to Liubashivka settlement hromada, one of the hromadas of Ukraine. Incorporated in 1901, Shkarbynka has a population of 61, and an area of 0.389 km^{2}.

== History ==
During the Holodomor famine of 1933, kulak Vasiliy Horbatiuk was the leader of the Shkarbynka kolkhoz. In order to prevent his village from starving, Horbatiuk allowed the people to glean the fields. He was promptly arrested for this act, and he died at the age of 28 in prison.

Until 18 July 2020, Shkarbynka belonged to Liubashivka Raion. The raion was abolished in July 2020 as part of the administrative reform of Ukraine, which reduced the number of raions of Odesa Oblast to seven. The area of Liubashivka Raion was merged into Podilsk Raion.

== Demographics ==
As of the most recent census in 2001, Shkarbynka had 61 registered inhabitants. The linguistic composition of the population was as follows:

Native languages in Shkarbynka
	percent
Ukrainian	77.0%
Romanian	21.3%
Russian	1.6%
