= Arbuzynka Raion =

Former subdivision of Mykolaiv Oblast, Ukraine

Arbuzynka Raion Арбузинський район
- Raion
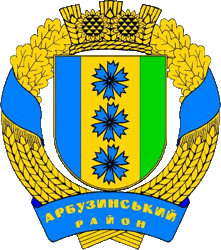
- Flag Coat of arms

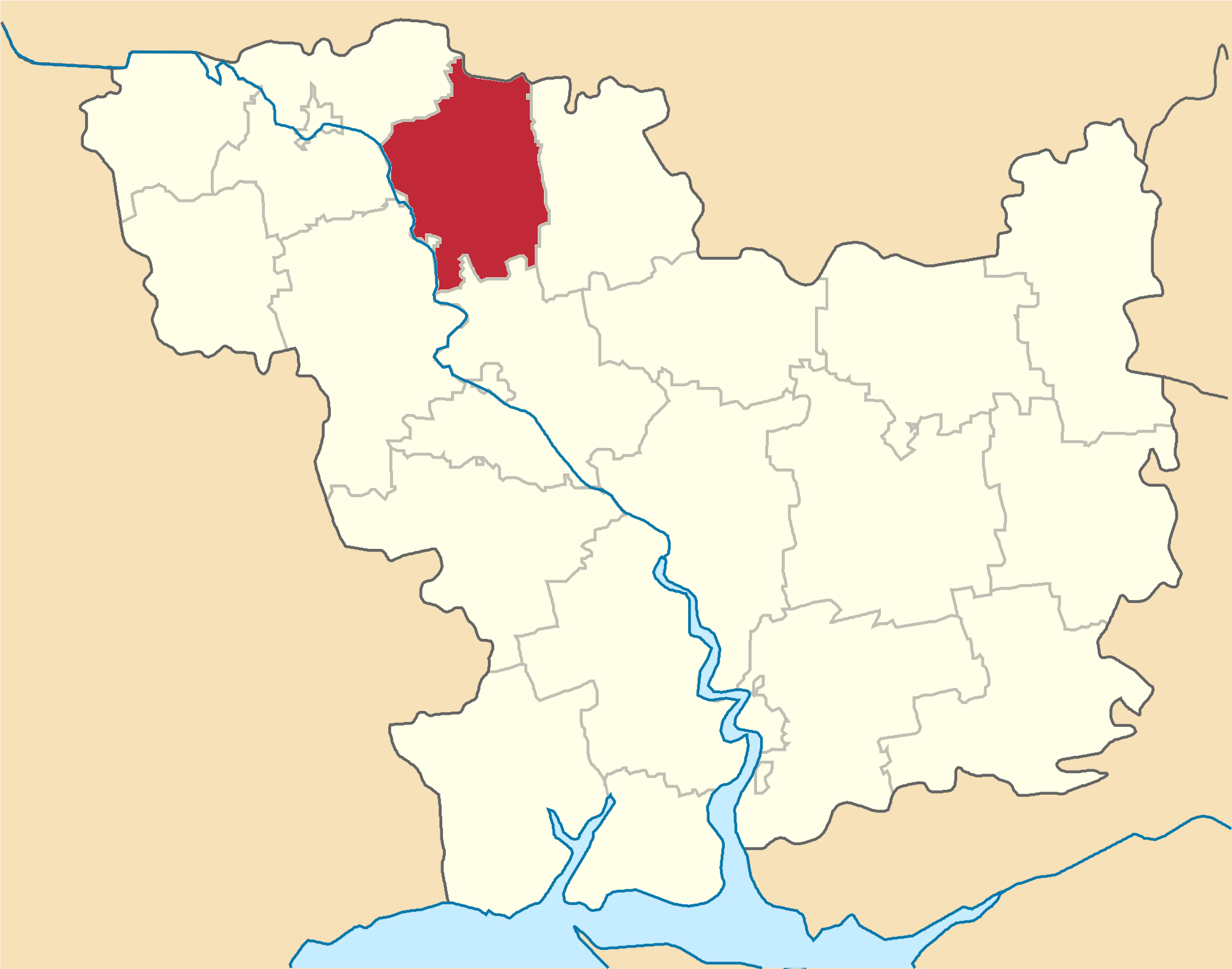
- Coordinates: 47°56′40″N 31°16′7″E
- Country: Ukraine
- Oblast: Mykolaiv Oblast
- Established: 1931
- Disestablished: 18 July 2020
- Admin. center: Arbuzynka
- Subdivisions: List: 0 — city councils; 2 — settlement councils; 12 — rural councils; Number of localities: 0 — cities; 2 — urban-type settlements; 62 — villages; 2 — rural settlements

Government
  - Governor: Yevgeniy Travyanko

Area
  - Total: 969 km^{2} (374 sq mi)

Population (2020)
  - Total: 19,269 ▼
  - Density: 19.9/km^{2} (51.5/sq mi)
- Time zone: UTC+02:00 (EET)
  - Summer (DST): UTC+03:00 (EEST)
- Postal index: 55300—55354
- Area code: +380 5132

Arbuzynka Raion (Ukrainian: Арбузинський район) was a subdivision of Mykolaiv Oblast of Ukraine. Its administrative center was the urban-type settlement of Arbuzynka. The raion was abolished on 18 July 2020 as part of the administrative reform of Ukraine, which reduced the number of raions of Mykolaiv Oblast to four. The area of Arbuzynka Raion was merged into Pervomaisk Raion. The last estimate of the raion population was 19,269 (2020 est.)

== History ==
In the beginning of the 19th century, the current area of the district belonged to Yelisavetgradsky Uyezd of Kherson Governorate. In 1816, the areas of Konstantinovskaya and Blagodatnovskaya Volosts were made military settlements. In 1828, Yelisavetgradsky Uyezd was merged with Olviopolsky Uyezd into Bobrinetsky Uyezd. In 1857, military settlements were abolished. In 1865, the administrative center of Bobrinetsky Uyezd was moved to Yelisavetgrad, and the uyezd was renamed Yelisavetgradsky. On 16 April 1920, Kherson Governorate was renamed Nikolayev Governorate, and on 21 October 1922, it was merged into Odessa Governorate. In 1923, uyezds in Ukrainian Soviet Socialist Republic were abolished, and the governorates were divided into okruhas. In 1925, the governorates were abolished, and okruhas were directly subordinated to Ukrainian SSR. In 1930, okruhas were abolished, and in 1931, Arbuzynka Raion, with the administrative center in Harbuzynka, was established. On 27 February 1932, Odessa Oblast was established, and Arbuzynka Raion was included into Odessa Oblast. In 1944, Arbuzynka Raion was transferred to Mykolaiv Oblast. In 1946, Harbuzynka was renamed Arbuzynka. In January 1963, during Khrushchyov's abortive administrative reform, Arbuzynka Raion was abolished and split between Pervomaisk and Bratske Raions. In 1966, Arbuzynka Raion was re-established. In 1967, Arbuzynka was granted urban-type settlement status.

== Subdivisions ==
At the time of disestablishment, the raion consisted of two hromadas,

- Arbuzynka settlement hromada with the administration in Arbuzynka;
- Blahodatne rural hromada with the administration in the selo of Blahodatne.
