= Kryve Ozero =

Rural locality in Mykolaiv Oblast, Ukraine

Kryve Ozero Криве Озеро
- Rural settlement
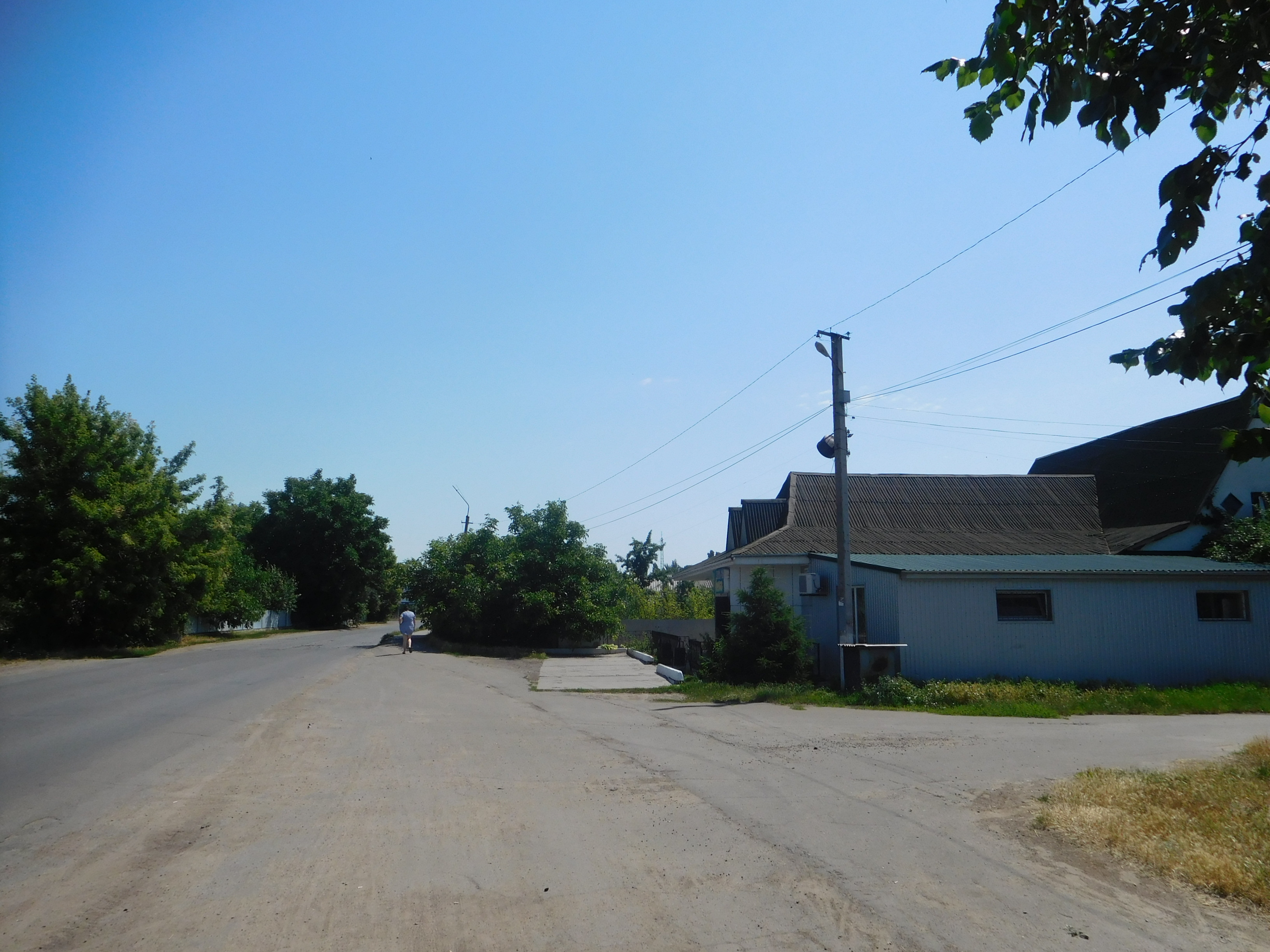

- Location of Kryve Ozero Kryve Ozero (Mykolaiv Oblast)
- Coordinates: 47°56′43″N 30°21′10″E
- Country: Ukraine
- Oblast: Mykolaiv Oblast
- Raion: Pervomaisk Raion

Population (2022)
  - Total: 7,262
- Time zone: UTC+2 (EET)
  - Summer (DST): UTC+3 (EEST)

Kryve Ozero (Ukrainian: Криве Озеро, Russian: Кривое Озеро) is a Rural settlement in Pervomaisk Raion in the northwest of Mykolaiv Oblast, Ukraine. It hosts the administration of Kryve Ozero settlement hromada, one of the hromadas of Ukraine. Population: 7,262 (2022 estimate).

The settlement is located on the banks of the Kodyma, a right tributary of the Southern Bug.

== History ==
Kryve Ozero was founded in 1762.

In the 1920s, Kryve Ozero belonged to Odesa Governorate. In 1923, uyezds in Ukrainian Soviet Socialist Republic were abolished, and the governorates were divided into okruhas. In 1923, Kryve Ozero Raion with the administrative center in Kryve Ozero was established. It belonged to Pervomaisk Okruha. In 1925, the governorates were abolished, and okruhas were directly subordinated to Ukrainian SSR. In 1930, okruhas were abolished, and on 27 February 1932, Odesa Oblast was established, and Kryve Ozero was included into Odesa Oblast. In February 1954, Kryve Ozero Raion was transferred to Mykolaiv Oblast. In 1970, Kryve Ozero was granted urban-type settlement status.

On 17 July 2020, Kryve Ozero Raion was abolished as part of the administrative reform of Ukraine, which reduced the number of raions of Mykolaiv Oblast to four. The area of Kryve Ozero Raion was merged into Pervomaisk Raion. On 26 January 2024, a new law entered into force which abolished the status of urban-type settlement status, and Kryve Ozero became a rural settlement.

== Economy ==
=== Transportation ===
The closest railway station is in Liubashivka 14 kilometres (8.7 mi) to the south. It has connections to Pervomaisk and Podilsk.

== Notable residents ==
- Israel Wachser (1892-1919), Russian-Jewish writer of short stories and children's literature
