= Pervomaisk Raion =

Subdivision of Mykolaiv Oblast, Ukraine

Pervomaisk Raion Первомайський район
- Raion
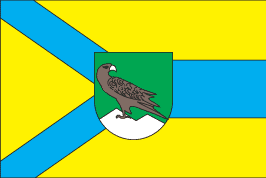
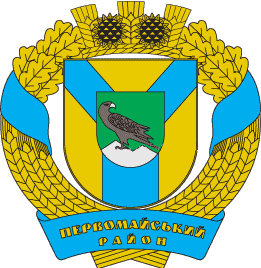
- Flag Coat of arms

- Coordinates: 48°0′42″N 30°51′24″E
- Country: Ukraine
- Oblast: Mykolaiv Oblast
- Admin. center: Pervomaisk
- Subdivisions: 8 hromadas

Government
  - Governor: Borys Demchenko

Area
  - Total: 3,792 km^{2} (1,464 sq mi)

Population (2022)
  - Total: 145,213
  - Density: 38.29/km^{2} (99.18/sq mi)
- Time zone: UTC+02:00 (EET)
  - Summer (DST): UTC+03:00 (EEST)
- Postal index: 55220—55276
- Area code: +380 5161

Pervomaisk Raion (Ukrainian: Первомайський район) is a raion (district) in Mykolaiv Oblast, Ukraine. Its administrative center is the town of Pervomaisk. Population: 145,213 (2022 estimate).

== History ==
In the beginning of the 19th century, the current area of the district belonged to Olviopolsky Uezd of Kherson Governorate. In 1828, Olviopolsky Uezd was merged with Yelisavetgradsky Uezd into Bobrinetsky Uezd. In 1865, the administrative center of Bobrinetsky Uezd was moved to Yelisavetgrad, and the uezd was renamed Yelisavetgradsky. In 1919, Olviopol was merged with Bohopil and Holta to form the city of Pervomaisk. On 16 April 1920, Kherson Governorate was renamed Nikolayev Governorate, and on 21 October 1922, it was merged into Odesa Governorate. In 1923, uezds in Ukrainian Soviet Socialist Republic were abolished, and the governorates were divided into okruhas. Bohopil Raion of Pervomaisk Okruha was established. In 1925, the governorates were abolished, and okruhas were directly subordinated to Ukrainian SSR. In 1927, Bohopil Raion was renamed Pervomaisk Raion. In 1930, okruhas were abolished, and raions were directly subordinated to Ukrainian SSR. On 27 February 1932, Odesa Oblast was established, and Pervomaisk Raion was included into Odesa Oblast. On 17 February 1954, Pervomaisk Raion was transferred to Mykolaiv Oblast.

On 18 July 2020, as part of the administrative reform of Ukraine, the number of raions of Mykolaiv Oblast was reduced to four, and the area of Pervomaisk Raion was significantly expanded. Three abolished raions, Arbuzynka, Kryve Ozero, and Vradiivka Raions, as well as the city of Pervomaisk, which was previously incorporated as a city of oblast significance and did not belong to the raion, were merged into Pervomaisk Raion. The January 2020 estimate of the raion population was 28,729 (2020 est.)

== Subdivisions ==
=== Current ===
After the reform in July 2020, the raion consisted of eight hromadas:

- Arbuzynka settlement hromada with the administration in the rural settlement of Arbuzynka, transferred from Arbuzynka Raion;
- Blahodatne rural hromada with the administration in the selo of Blahodatne, transferred from Arbuzynka Raion;
- Kamianyi Mist rural hromada with the administration in the settlement of Kamianyi Mist, retained from Pervomaisk Raion;
- Kryve Ozero settlement hromada with the administration in the rural settlement of Kryve Ozero, transferred from Kryve Ozero Raion;
- Myhiia rural hromada with the administration in the selo of Myhiia, retained from Pervomaisk Raion;
- Pervomaisk urban hromada with the administration in the city of Pervomaisk, transferred from the city of oblast significance of Pervomaisk;
- Syniukhyn Brid rural hromada with the administration in the selo of Syniukhyn Brid, retained from Pervomaisk Raion;
- Vradiivka settlement hromada with the administration in the rural settlement of Vradiivka, transferred from Vradiivka Raion.

=== Before 2020 ===
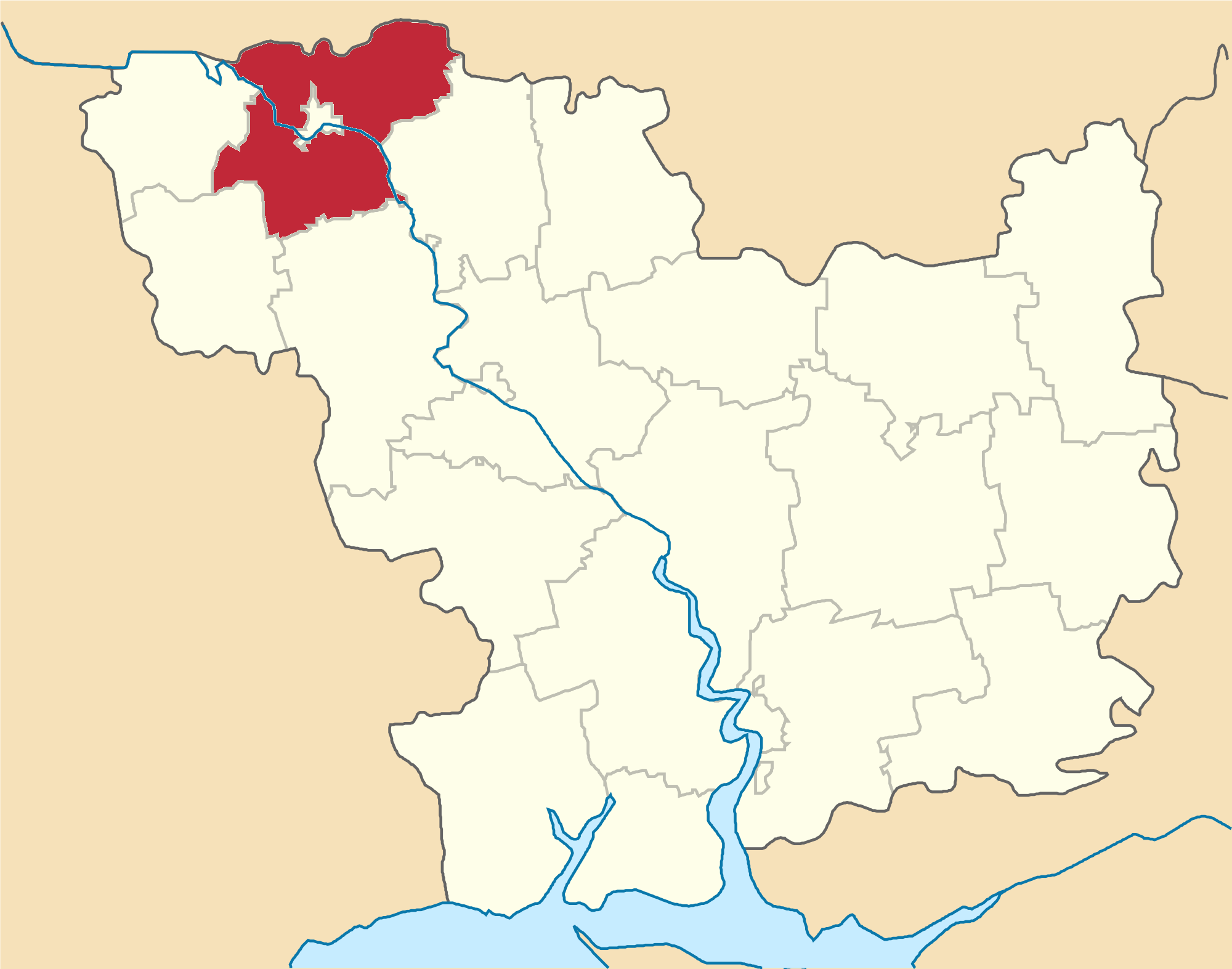
Pervomaisk Raion in Mykolaiv Oblast before 2020

Before the 2020 reform, the raion consisted of three hromadas,

- Kamianyi Mist rural hromada with the administration in Kamianyi Mist;
- Myhiia rural hromada with the administration in Myhiia;
- Syniukhyn Brid rural hromada with the administration in Syniukhyn Brid.
