= Arbuzynka =

Rural locality in Mykolaiv Oblast, Ukraine

Arbuzynka Арбузинка
- Rural settlement
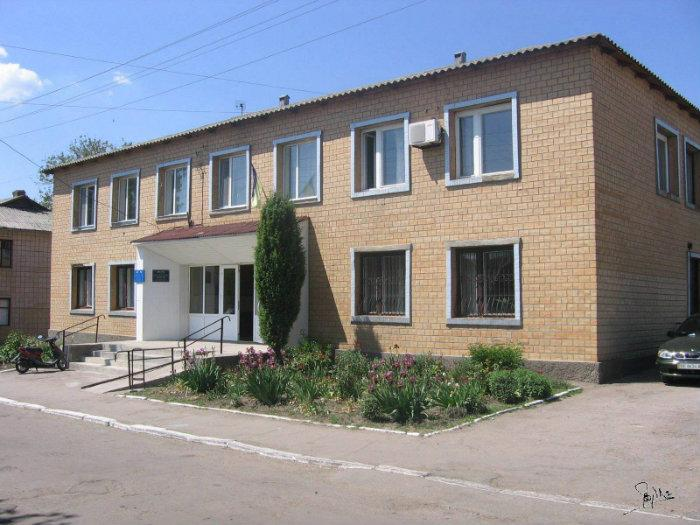

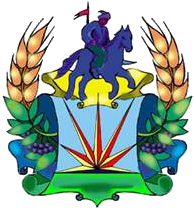
- Coat of arms

- Location within Ukraine Location within Mykolaiv Oblast
- Coordinates: 47°54′24″N 31°18′49″E
- Country: Ukraine
- Oblast: Mykolaiv Oblast
- Raion: Pervomaisk Raion

Population (2022)
  - Total: 5,954
- Time zone: UTC+2 (EET)
  - Summer (DST): UTC+3 (EEST)

Arbuzynka (until 1946 as Harbuzynka; Ukrainian: Арбузинка, Russian: Арбузи́нка) is a rural settlement in Pervomaisk Raion in the north of Mykolaiv Oblast, Ukraine. It hosts the administration of Arbuzynka settlement hromada, one of the hromadas of Ukraine. Population: 5,954 (2022 estimate).

Arbuzynka is located on the banks of the Arbuzynka, a right tributary of the Mertvovid, in the drainage basin of the Southern Bug.

== History ==
Arbuzynka was founded as Haidamatske by Zaporozhian Cossacks before 1775. In 1816, Arbuzynka (Harbuzynka) became a military settlement which belonged to Yelisavetgradsky Uyezd of Kherson Governorate. It was a part of the 3rd Bug Uhlan Regiment, which later was renamed Voznesensk Uhlan Regiment. In 1828, Yelisavetgradsky Uyezd was merged with Olviopolsky Uyezd into Bobrinetsky Uyezd. In 1857, military settlements were abolished. In 1865, the administrative center of Bobrinetsky Uyezd was moved to Yelisavetgrad, and the uyezd was renamed Yelisavetgradsky. Arbuzynka was a selo and belonged to Konstantinovskaya Volost of Yelisavetgradsky Uyezd.

On 16 April 1920, Kherson Governorate was renamed Nikolayev Governorate, and on 21 October 1922, it was merged into Odesa Governorate. In 1923, uyezds in Ukrainian Soviet Socialist Republic were abolished, and the governorates were divided into okruhas. In 1925, the governorates were abolished, and okruhas were directly subordinated to Ukrainian SSR. In 1930, okruhas were abolished, and in 1931, Arbuzynka Raion, with the administrative center in Harbuzynka, was established. On 27 February 1932, Odesa Oblast was established, and Arbuzynka Raion was included into Odesa Oblast. In 1944, Arbuzynka Raion was transferred to Mykolaiv Oblast. In 1946, Harbuzynka was renamed Arbuzynka. In January 1963, during the abortive Khrushchyov administrative reform, Arbuzynka Raion was abolished, and Arbuzynka was moved to Bratske Raion. In 1966, Arbuzynka Raion, with the administrative center in Arbuzynka, was re-established. In 1967, Arbuzynka was granted urban-type settlement status.

On 18 July 2020, Arbuzynka Raion was abolished as part of the administrative reform of Ukraine, which reduced the number of raions of Mykolaiv Oblast to four. The area of Arbuzynka Raion was merged into Pervomaisk Raion. On 26 January 2024, a new law entered into force which abolished the status of urban-type settlement status, and Arbuzynka became a rural settlement.

== Economy ==
=== Transportation ===
The closest railway station, about 4 kilometres (2.5 mi) west of the settlement, is in Kavuny, on the railway line connecting Odesa and Pomichna.

== Gallery ==
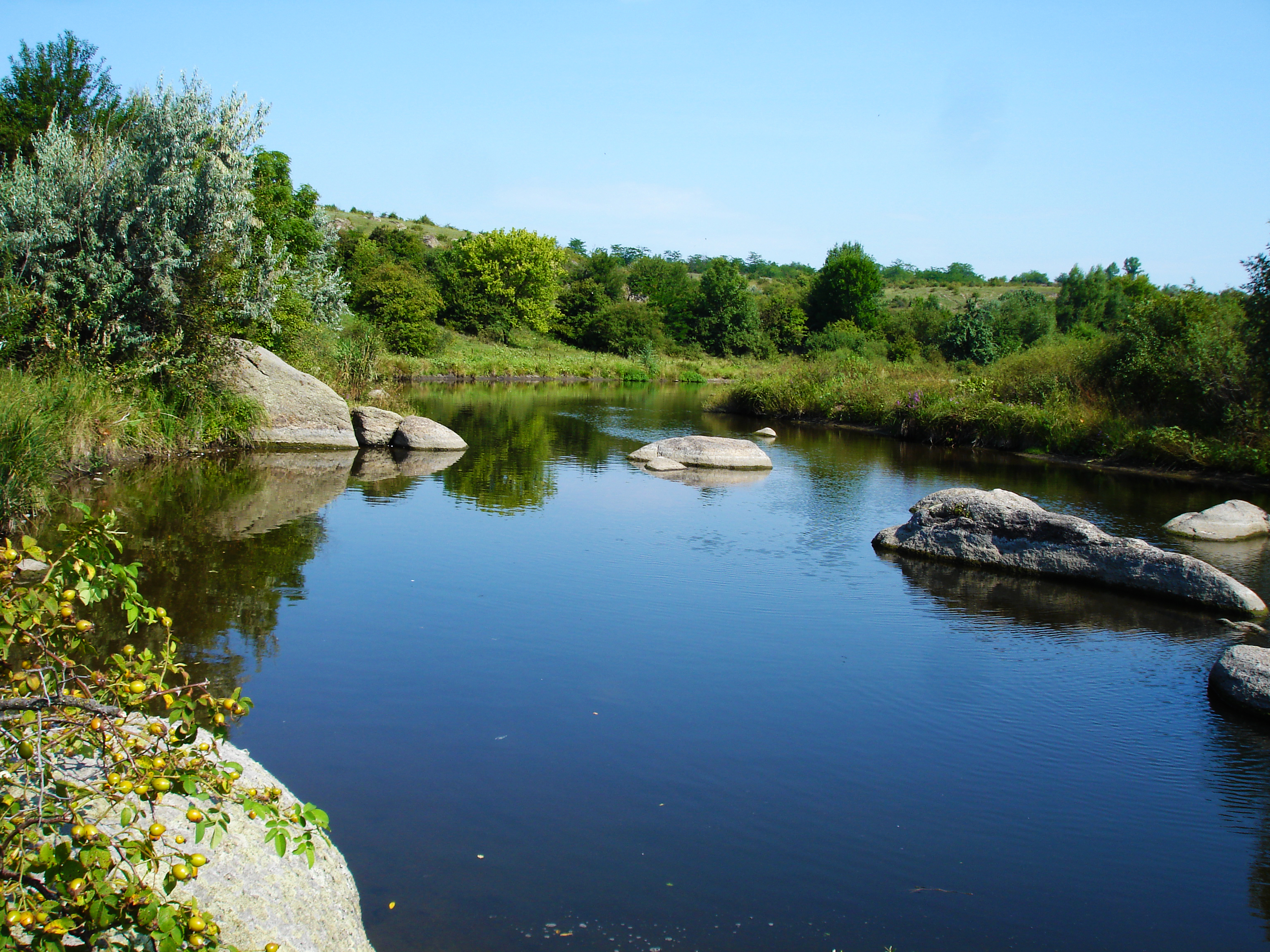

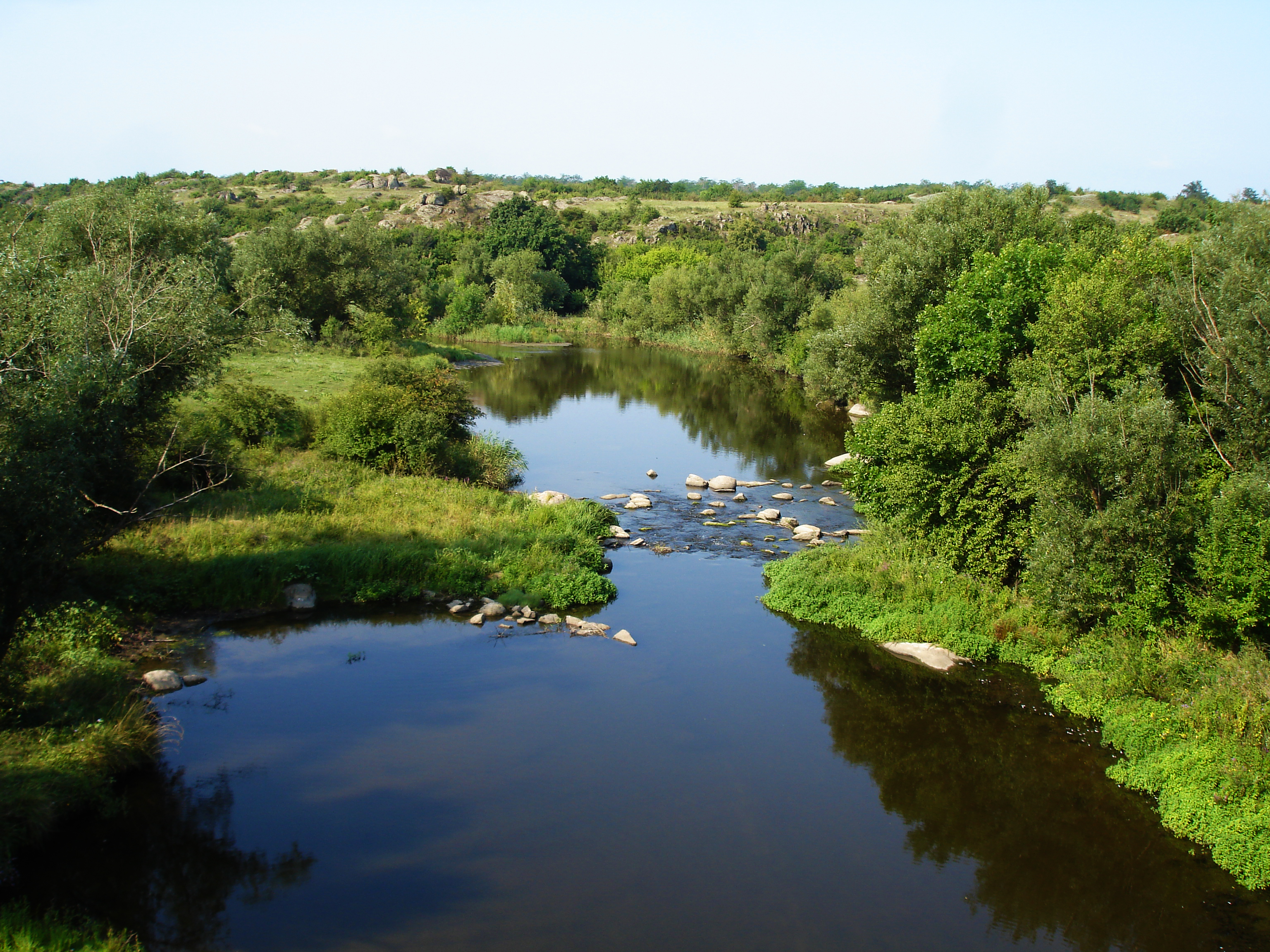

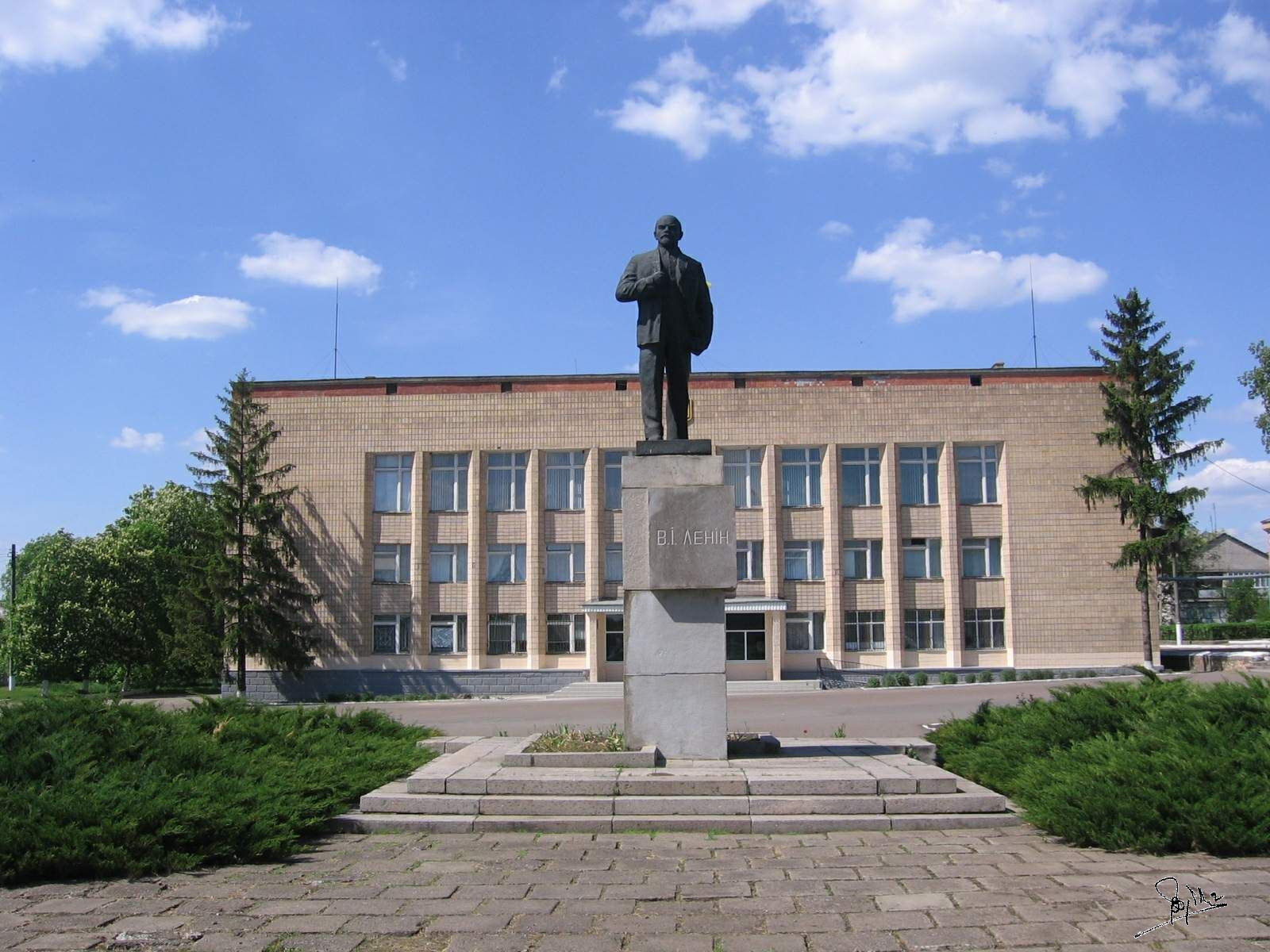
