= Kryve Ozero Raion =

Former subdivision of Mykolaiv Oblast, Ukraine

Kryve Ozero Raion Кривоозерський район
- Raion
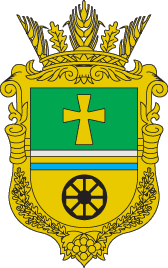
- Flag Coat of arms

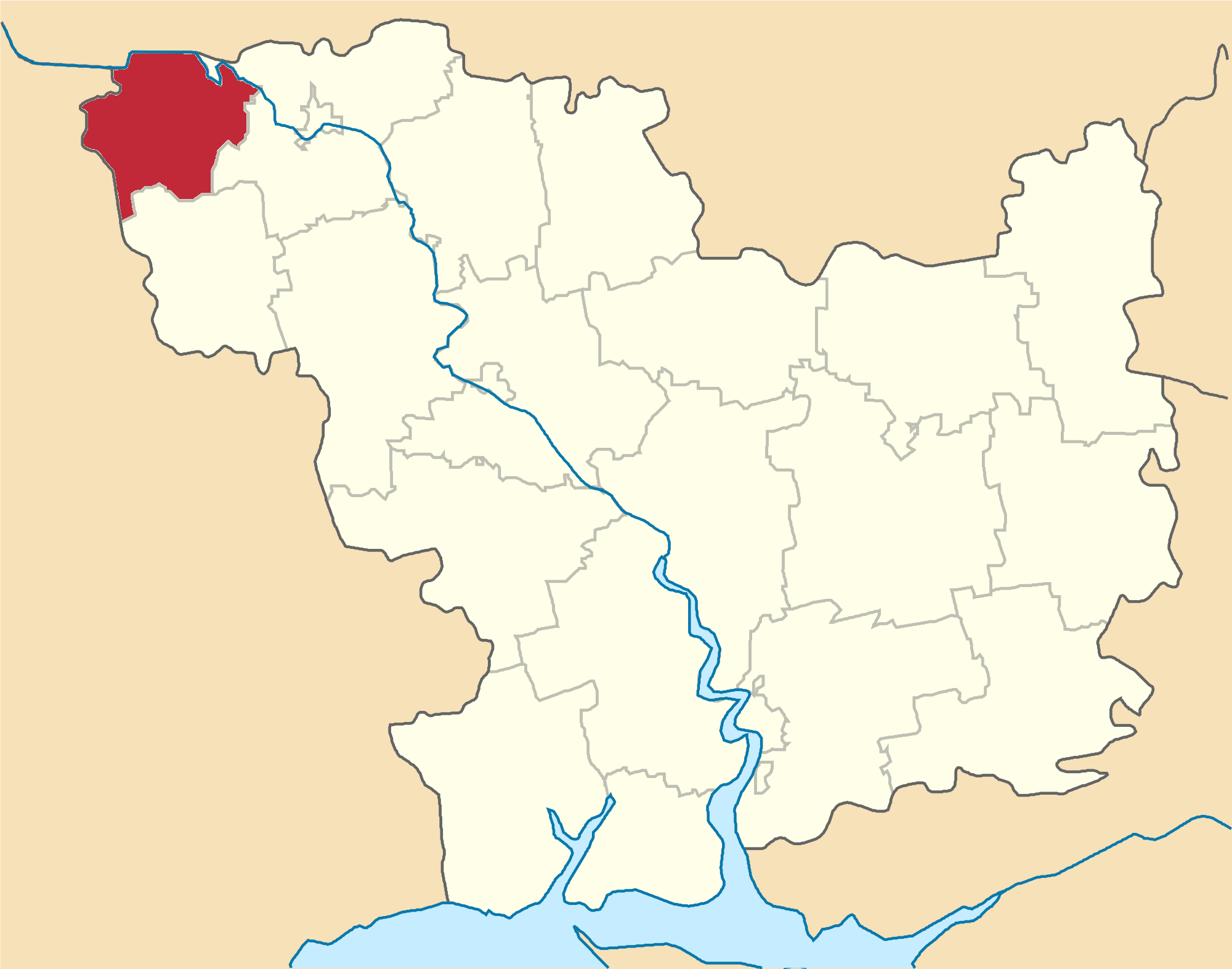
- Coordinates: 48°0′51″N 30°26′34″E
- Country: Ukraine
- Oblast: Mykolaiv Oblast
- Established: 1923
- Disestablished: 18 July 2020
- Admin. center: Kryve Ozero
- Subdivisions: List: 0 — city councils; 1 — settlement councils; 15 — rural councils; Number of localities: 0 — cities; 1 — urban-type settlements; 22 — villages; 4 — rural settlements

Government
  - Governor: Lyudmila Rolyan

Area
  - Total: 814 km^{2} (314 sq mi)

Population (2020)
  - Total: 23,825 ▼
  - Density: 29.3/km^{2} (75.8/sq mi)
- Time zone: UTC+02:00 (EET)
  - Summer (DST): UTC+03:00 (EEST)
- Postal index: 55100—55152
- Area code: +380 5133

Kryve Ozero Raion (Ukrainian: Кривоозерський район) was a subdivision of Mykolaiv Oblast of Ukraine. Its administrative center was the urban-type settlement of Kryve Ozero. The raion was abolished on 18 July 2020 as part of the administrative reform of Ukraine, which reduced the number of raions of Mykolaiv Oblast to four. The area of Kryve Ozero Raion was merged into Pervomaisk Raion. The last estimate of the raion population was 23,825 (2020 est.)

== History ==
In the 1920s, the current area of the district belonged to Odessa Governorate. In 1923, uyezds in Ukrainian Soviet Socialist Republic were abolished, and the governorates were divided into okruhas. In 1923, Kryve Ozero Raion with the administrative center in Kryve Ozero was established. It belonged to Pervomaisk Okruha. In 1925, the governorates were abolished, and okruhas were directly subordinated to Ukrainian SSR. In 1930, okruhas were abolished, and on 27 February 1932, Odessa Oblast was established, and Kryve Ozero was included into Odessa Oblast. In February 1954, Kryve Ozero Raion was transferred to Mykolaiv Oblast.

At the time of disestablishment, the raion consisted of one hromada, Kryve Ozero settlement hromada with the administration in Kryve Ozero.
