= Baku during World War I =

With the outbreak of hostilities in the Caucasus as part of World War I, Azerbaijan also became involved in the war, being part of the Russian Empire. Baku oil was of particular importance.

== Socio-economic situation ==
By the beginning of the war, Baku's population exceeded 215,000, comprising 36% Russians, 34% Azerbaijanis, 19% Armenians, and 4.5% Jews.

In August 1914, the provincial Committee for assistance to war victims was established in Baku. Additionally, the Baku city Council provided material assistance to soldiers families. In December 1914, the Caucasus Committee was established to provide assistance to refugees.

From February 14 to 18, 1916, women in Baku staged protests against the increase in food prices.

In 1917, oil production in Baku was 382,000 tons, that is, more than 15% of world production. In the spring of 1918, approximately 1,280,000 tons of oil were shipped from Baku to Russia.

=== Number of oil wells ===
Stages of work	1914	1915	1916
Drilled wells	563	482	433
Spudded wells	218	176	149
Newly drilled wells	235	179	166

There were a lot of various committees functioning in Baku during the war: Oil Committee, Tank Distribution Committee, Kerosene Committee, etc. The number of large machine-building plants reached.

On September 10, 1918, the currency named "Baku bona" appeared.

== Military-political situation ==
In 1915, military units were stationed on the territory of Baku

On November 2, 1917, at the conference of the Baku Soviet, it was decided to establish Soviet power in Baku. Earlier, the headquarters of the Military Revolutionary Committee headed by Korganov was moved to the city.

In February 1918, the Transcaucasian Sejm was established

As a result of the March 1918 genocide committed by the Armenian-Bolshevik armed groups, more than 12 thousand Azerbaijanis were killed in Baku. The Muslim quarters "Mammadli" and "Kirpichhana", public buildings, mosques, etc. were destroyed.

On April 20, 1918, the Baku City Duma, headed by Fatali Khan Khoysky, was dissolved. The activities of national councils and the press were banned.

In the same year, on April 25, the Baku Council of People's Commissars was established, which included only three Azerbaijanis. The former authorities were replaced by new ones: the workers'-and-peasants' militia, the Military Tribunal, the extraordinary Committee for combating counter-revolution, the city, circuit, and district people's courts, and so on. The oil industry and the Caspian Merchant Fleet were nationalized.

On July 31, 1918, the Baku Council of People's Commissars ceased to exist. From August 1 to September 1 of the same year, an English corps headed by General Dunsterville remained in Baku. A coalition government called “Dictatorship of the Central Caspian” was established.

The battles for Baku that began in August ended with the liberation of the city by the Caucasian Islamic army on September 15, 1918.

On September 17, 1918, the national government of the Azerbaijan Democratic Republic with its center in Ganja was transferred to Baku.

== National liberation movement ==
In the spring of 1916, at the initiative of the Bolsheviks, the Adalat ("Justice") organization was established in Baku to assist workers from southern Azerbaijan.

On March 17, 1917, the Executive Committee of public organizations was established in the city, which was the local authority of the provisional government.

In addition to political parties, there were Muslim national councils in Azerbaijan, the most popular of which was the Baku Muslim National Council.

On April 15–20, 1917, a Congress of Muslims of the Caucasus was held in Baku. The main slogan of the Congress was the goal of uniting all Muslims in Russia. The merger of two political parties— Musavat and the Turkic Federalist Party—created the Turkic Federalist Party Musavat.

The national liberation movement in Northern Azerbaijan, centered in Baku, ended with the restoration of national statehood represented by the Azerbaijan Democratic Republic in 1918.

== Culture ==
In 1914–1915, a weekly satirical magazine "Mezeli" ("Funny") was published in Baku in the Azerbaijani language. For all time, 42 issues were published.

In 1915, the leader of the Musavat party, M. E. Rasulzade, launched the publication of the daily Turkic newspaper “Achig soz".

In 1916, teachers' seminaries were opened in Baku.

In August 1918, special pedagogical courses were opened to train qualified personnel.

The Azerbaijani State Theater under the direction of Huseyn Arablinsky was functioning in that period.

== See also ==
- Battle of Baku
- Azerbaijan in World War II
