= Liubashivka settlement hromada =

Coordinates: 47°50′N 30°15′E

Liubashivka settlement hromada Любашівська селищна громада
- Hromada
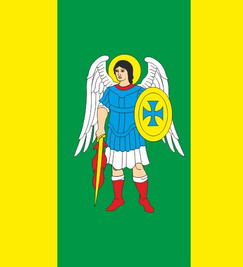
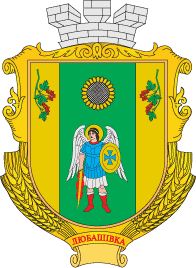
- Flag Coat of arms
- Interactive map of Liubashivka settlement hromada
- Country: Ukraine
- Oblast: Odesa Oblast
- Raion: Podilsk Raion
- Admin. center: Liubashivka

Area
  - Total: 834.7 km^{2} (322.3 sq mi)

Population (2020)
  - Total: 21,709
  - Density: 26.01/km^{2} (67.36/sq mi)
- CATOTTG code: UA51120130000064324
- Settlements: 43
- Rural settlements: 1
- Villages: 42
- Website: https://lubashivska-gromada.gov.ua/

Liubashivka settlement hromada (Ukrainian: Любашівська селищна громада) is a hromada in Podilsk Raion of Odesa Oblast in southwestern Ukraine. Population: 21,709 (2020 est.)

The hromada consists of one rural settlement (Liubashivka) and 42 villages:

- Ahafiivka
- Aheevka
- Adamivka
- Antonivka
- Archypytivka
- Bobryk Druhyi
- Bobryk Pershyi
- Bobrytske
- Bokove
- Chaikivka
- Chaikivske
- Chervonyi Yar
- Demydivka
- Dmytrivka
- Ivanivka
- Katerynivka Persha
- Kozachiy Yar
- Komarivka
- Krychunove
- Mala Vasylivka
- Mykhailivka
- Novovozdvyzhenka
- Novokarbivka
- Novooleksandrivka
- Novotroitske
- Novoselivka
- Oleksandrivka
- Petrivka
- Pylypivka
- Pokrovka
- Serhiivka
- Shaitanka
- Shkarbynka
- Stepanivka
- Syrivske
- Troitske
- Velyka Vasylivka
- Velyke Bokove
- Vyshneve
- Yanyshivka
- Yanovka
- Zaplazy

== Demographics ==
The linguistic composition of the population as of the 2001 Ukrainian census was as follows:

Native languages (2001)
	percent
Ukrainian	92.6%
Romanian	3.9%
Russian	2.9%
Armenian	0.2%
Belarusian	0.1%
Romani	0.1%
others	0.3%

== Links ==
- Любашівська селищна ОТГ // Облікова картка на офіційному вебсайті Верховної Ради України.
- gromada.info: Любашівська об’єднана територіальна громада
- Децентралізація влади: Любашівська громада
