= Liubashivka =

Rural locality in Odesa Oblast, Ukraine

Liubashivka Любашівка
- Rural settlement
- Liubashivka
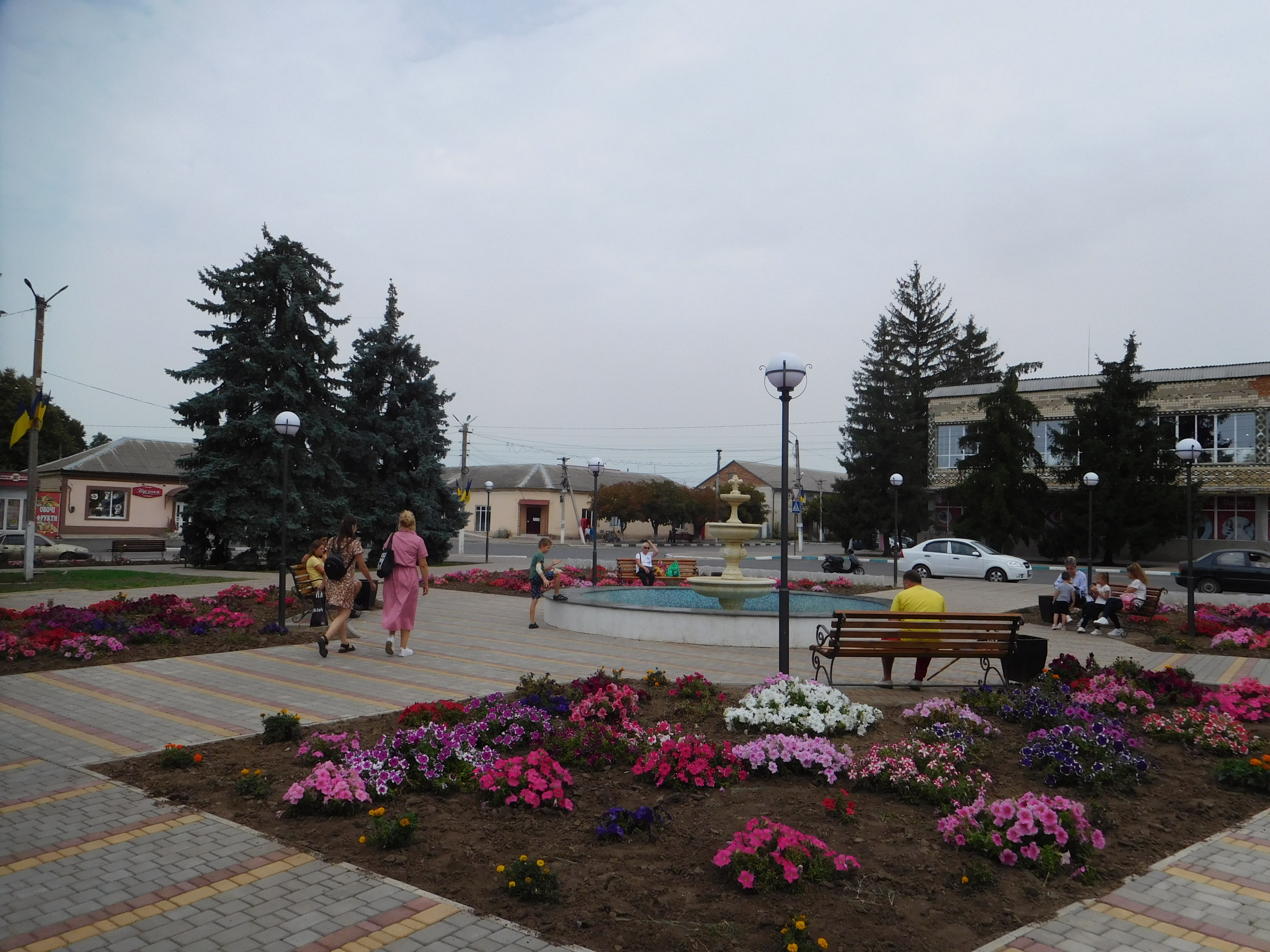

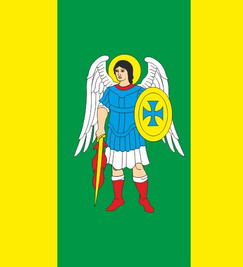
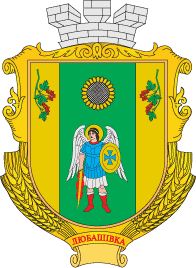
- Flag Coat of arms

- Location of Liubashivka Liubashivka (Odesa Oblast)
- Coordinates: 47°50′9″N 30°15′51″E
- Country: Ukraine
- Oblast: Odesa Oblast
- Raion: Podilsk Raion
- Established: 18th century
- Town status: from 1957

Government
  - Mayor: Bohdan Pavlov

Area
  - Total: 8.87 km^{2} (3.42 sq mi)

Population (2001)
  - Total: 11,500
  - Density: 1,103/km^{2} (2,860/sq mi)
- Postal code: Postal_code
- Area code: UA 66500
- Website: Любашівська громада

Liubashivka (Ukrainian: Любаші́вка, Ljubašívka, Russian: Любашёвка) is a rural settlement in Podilsk Raion of Odesa Oblast (region), Ukraine, located of south-western Ukraine. Liubashivka hosts the administration of Liubashivka settlement hromada, one of the hromadas of Ukraine. Population: 8,729 (2022 estimate).

== History ==
Town was founded in the 18th century.

A railway from Odesa to Kropyvnytskyi and a railway station were built here in 1868.

Many armies passed through town in the period from 1917 to 1920, when Ukraine gained its independence from Imperial Russia for a short period of time. They represented different powers: Bolsheviks, Central Council of Ukraine, Makhno movement and the White movement. With the end of the war, the Ukrainian Socialist Soviet Republic was established. The USSR launched a planned economy, rapid industrialization and collectivization of its agriculture.

The Stalin's Ukrainian famine (1932—1933), or Holodomor was one of the largest national catastrophes in the modern history of Liubashivka. Until World War II the town had a Jewish community. In 1940 Jewish population was 2500.

During World War II, Liubashivka was occupied by Romanian and German forces from August 4, 1941 to March 30, 1944. The Nazis murdered approximately 400 people in Liubashivka, mostly from its Jewish community. By 1990, the Jewish population was only 5 persons.

In 1957, Liubashivka received urban-type settlement status.

In 1991, after the collapse of the USSR, the city became part of newly independent Ukraine.

Until 18 July 2020, Liubashivka was the administrative center of Liubashivka Raion. The raion was abolished in July 2020 as part of the administrative reform of Ukraine, which reduced the number of raions of Odesa Oblast to seven. The area of Liubashivka Raion was merged into Podilsk Raion. Until 26 January 2024, Liubashivka was designated an urban-type settlement. On this day, a new law entered into force which abolished this status, and Liubashivka became a rural settlement.

== Infrastructure ==
There are two schools, one hospital, a railway station, and a hotel.

Liubashivka is an important transport center and located approximately 160 kilometers from the region capital, Odesa. The town lies on a route Highway05/European route 95: Kyiv — Odesa — Merzifon.

Through the territory of the Liubashivka pass the railroad routes.

== Demographics ==
As of the 2001 census, Liubashivka had a population of 9,780 inhabitants. The settlement is almost entirely Ukrainophone. The exact composition of the population by their first language was as follows:

Native languages in Liubashivka
| | percent |
| Ukrainian | 93.7% |
| Russian | 4.5% |
| Romanian | 1.0% |
| Armenian | 0.2% |
| Belarusian | 0.2% |
| Romani | 0.2% |
| others | 0.1% |

== Climate ==
Climate data for Liubashivka (1991–2020)
| Month | Jan | Feb | Mar | Apr | May | Jun | Jul | Aug | Sep | Oct | Nov | Dec | Year |
|---|---|---|---|---|---|---|---|---|---|---|---|---|---|
| Mean daily maximum °C (°F) | −0.4 (31.3) | 1.6 (34.9) | 7.8 (46.0) | 16.1 (61.0) | 22.1 (71.8) | 25.7 (78.3) | 28.0 (82.4) | 27.8 (82.0) | 21.8 (71.2) | 14.4 (57.9) | 6.8 (44.2) | 1.4 (34.5) | 14.4 (57.9) |
| Daily mean °C (°F) | −3.1 (26.4) | −1.8 (28.8) | 3.0 (37.4) | 10.1 (50.2) | 15.9 (60.6) | 19.7 (67.5) | 21.8 (71.2) | 21.4 (70.5) | 15.8 (60.4) | 9.5 (49.1) | 3.4 (38.1) | −1.4 (29.5) | 9.5 (49.1) |
| Mean daily minimum °C (°F) | −5.6 (21.9) | −4.7 (23.5) | −0.8 (30.6) | 4.7 (40.5) | 10.1 (50.2) | 14.1 (57.4) | 16.0 (60.8) | 15.3 (59.5) | 10.5 (50.9) | 5.3 (41.5) | 0.7 (33.3) | −3.7 (25.3) | 5.2 (41.4) |
| Average precipitation mm (inches) | 34 (1.3) | 27 (1.1) | 31 (1.2) | 34 (1.3) | 50 (2.0) | 70 (2.8) | 67 (2.6) | 43 (1.7) | 46 (1.8) | 39 (1.5) | 41 (1.6) | 37 (1.5) | 519 (20.4) |
| Average precipitation days (≥ 1.0 mm) | 7.3 | 6.0 | 6.4 | 6.1 | 7.3 | 8.1 | 6.2 | 4.5 | 5.6 | 4.8 | 6.0 | 6.7 | 75.0 |
| Average relative humidity (%) | 86.3 | 82.7 | 74.2 | 62.8 | 62.8 | 65.4 | 63.7 | 60.2 | 66.5 | 76.2 | 85.7 | 87.8 | 72.9 |
Source: NOAA

== See also ==
- International Highways (Ukraine)
