= Zelenohirske settlement hromada =

Coordinates: 47°52′N 30°05′E

Zelenohirske settlement hromada Зеленогірська селищна громада
- Hromada
- Interactive map of Zelenohirske settlement hromada
- Country: Ukraine
- Oblast: Odesa Oblast
- Raion: Podilsk Raion
- Admin. center: Zelenohirske

Area
  - Total: 269.8 km^{2} (104.2 sq mi)

Population (2020)
  - Total: 7,544
  - Density: 27.96/km^{2} (72.42/sq mi)
- CATOTTG code: UA51120070000097161
- Settlements: 12
- Rural settlements: 1
- Villages: 11
- Website: https://zelenogirska-gromada.gov.ua/

Zelenohirske settlement hromada (Ukrainian: Зеленогірська селищна громада) is a hromada in Podilsk Raion of Odesa Oblast in southwestern Ukraine. Population: 7,544 (2020 est.)

The hromada consists of one rural settlement (Zelenohirske) and 11 villages:

- Chabanivka
- Hvozdavka Druha
- Hvozdavka Persha
- Poznanka Druha
- Poznanka Persha
- Shlykareve
- Soltanivka
- Vasylivka
- Volodymyrivka
- Yasenove Druhe
- Yasenove Pershe

== Links ==
- Зеленогірська селищна ОТГ // Облікова картка на офіційному вебсайті Верховної Ради України.
- Зеленогірська об’єднана територіальна громада
