= Kodyma (river) =

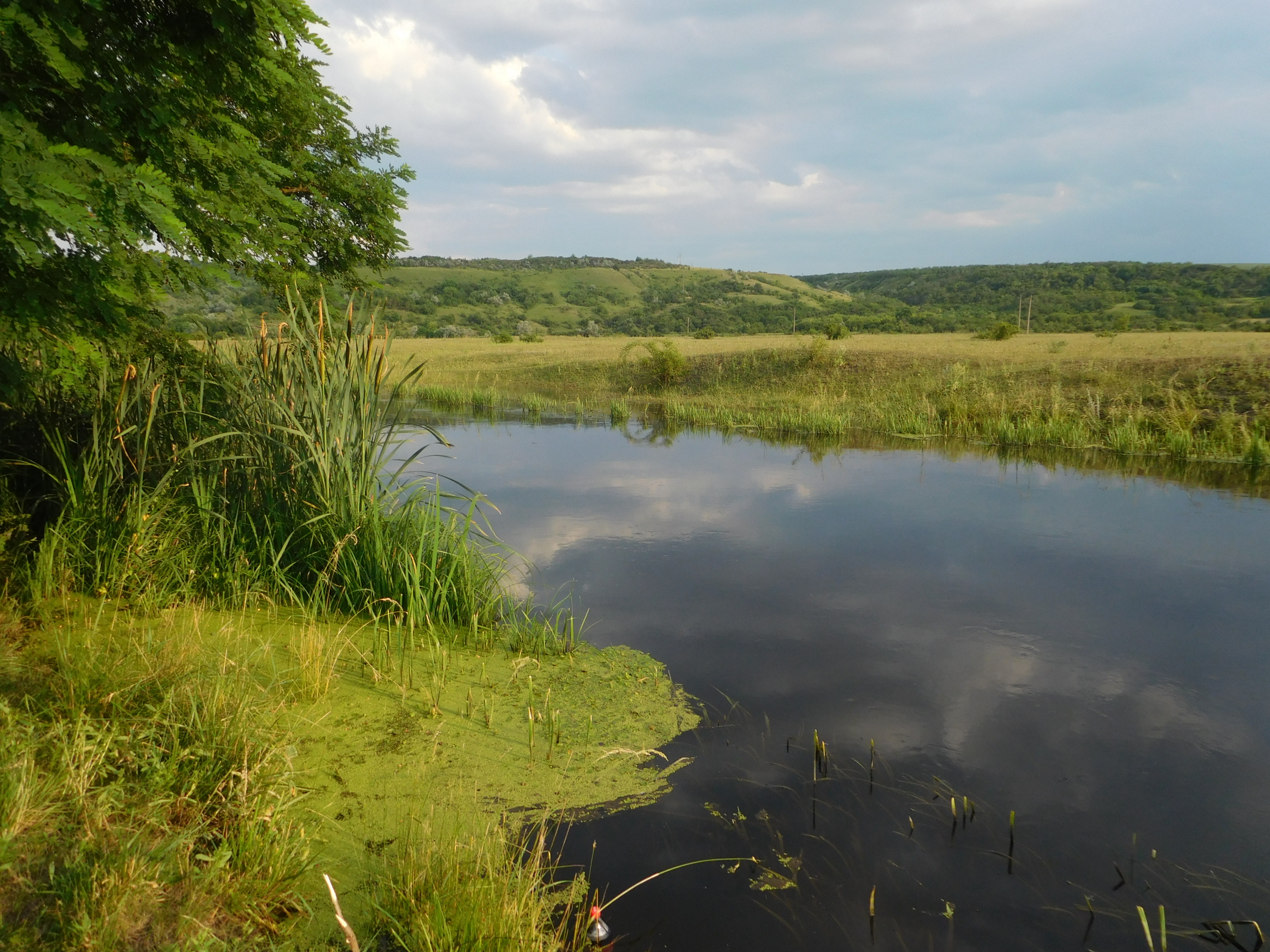

Location
- Country: Ukraine

Physical characteristics
- Source
  - elevation: 165 m (541 ft)
- Mouth: Southern Bug
  - coordinates: 48.0070°N 30.8093°E
- Length: 149 km (93 mi)
- Basin size: 2,470 km^{2} (950 sq mi)

Basin features
- Progression: Southern Bug→ Dnieper–Bug estuary→ Black Sea

The Kodyma (Ukrainian: Кодима) is a right tributary of the Southern Buh river of Ukraine. Originating from springs in a boggy valley near the village of Budei, Podilsk Raion, Odesa Oblast, it flows within the Odesa Oblast and Mykolaiv Oblast and joins Southern Buh about 199 km away from its mouth, near Pervomaisk.

== History ==
Between the 16th and 18th centuries the river formed the border between Poland-Lithuania and the Ottoman Empire. In 1693 Semen Paliy's force joined by members of Left-bank Ukrainian regiments defeated a Tatar army on the river. Another battle fought between Russian-Ukrainian troops and the Ottomans and Tatars took place here in 1738. Later the river served as the administrative border of Podolia and Kherson governorates.

== Settled localities ==
Settlements by the river include Balta, Holma, Bobryk Pershyi, and Kryve Ozero.
