= Bolharka, Rozdilna Raion, Odesa Oblast =

Rural locality in Odesa Oblast, Ukraine

Bolharka Болгарка
- Village
- Interactive map of Bolharka
- Location in Ukraine
- Coordinates: 47°29′N 29°39′E
- Country: Ukraine
- Oblast: Odesa Oblast
- Raion: Rozdilna Raion
- Hromada: Zakharivka settlement hromada
- Village founded: 1857

Area
  - Total: 0.6 km^{2} (0.23 sq mi)
- Elevation: 216 m (709 ft)

Population (2001)
  - Total: 290
  - Density: 483.33/km^{2} (1,251.8/sq mi)
- Time zone: UTC+2 (EET)
  - Summer (DST): UTC+3 (EEST)
- Postal code: 66710
- Area code: +380 4860

Bolharka (Ukrainian: Болгарка) is a village in Rozdilna Raion, Ukraine. It belongs to Zakharivka settlement hromada, one of the hromadas of Ukraine. The village has a population of 290.

Previously named Pervomaiske, the village was renamed, by the Ukrainian parliament, in September 2024 to its current name to comply with the Ukrainian decolonization law.

Until 18 July 2020, Pervomaiske belonged to Zakharivka Raion. The raion was abolished in July 2020 as part of the administrative reform of Ukraine, which reduced the number of raions of Odesa Oblast to seven. The area of Zakharivka Raion was merged into Rozdilna Raion. In 2001, 83.79% of the inhabitants spoke Ukrainian as their native language, while 14.48% spoke Romanian, and 1.72% spoke Russian.
