= Yosypivka, Rozdilna Raion, Odesa Oblast =

Rural locality in Odesa Oblast, Ukraine

Yosypivka Йосипівка
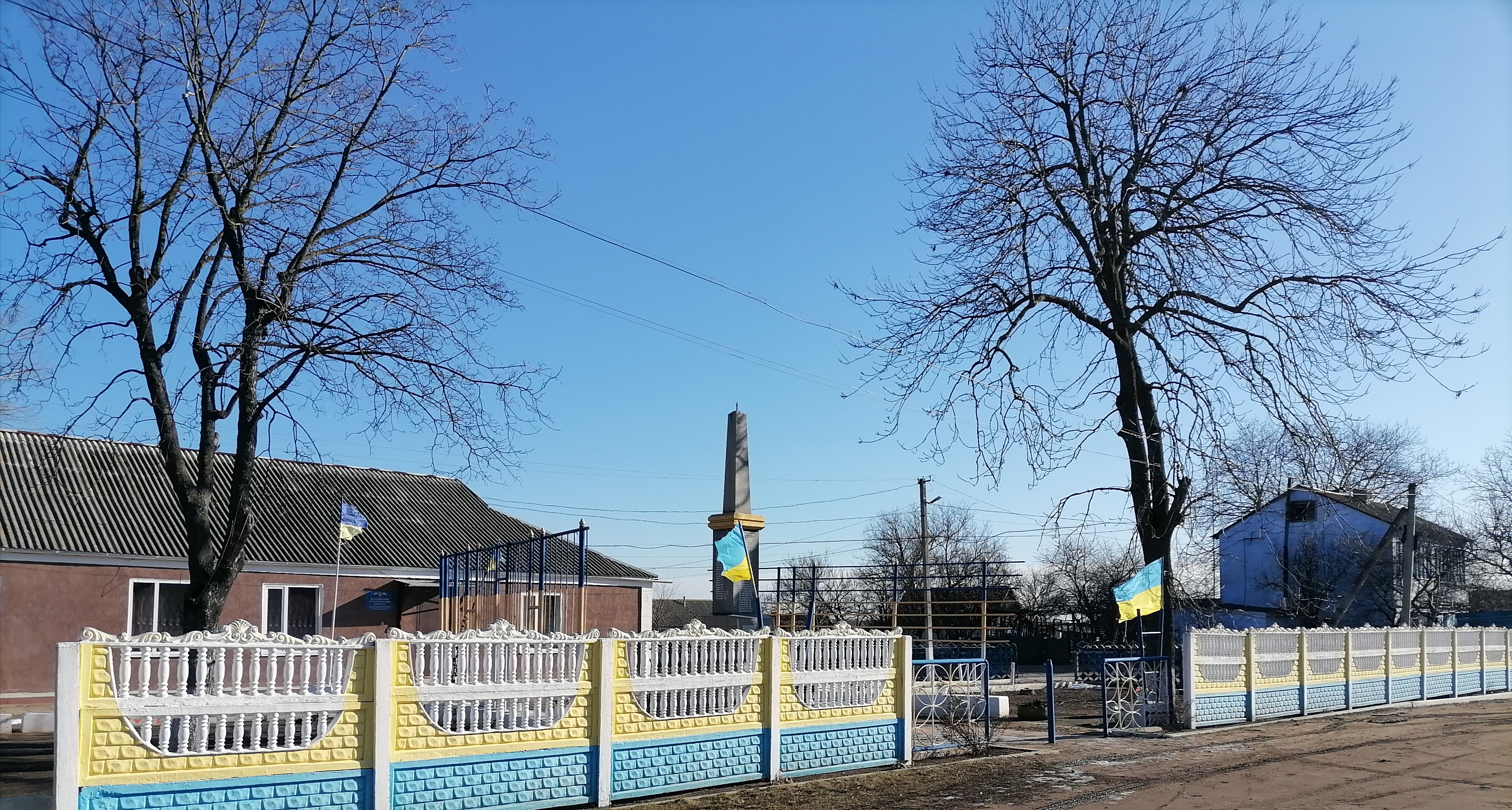

- Location in Ukraine Yosypivka (Odesa Oblast)
- Coordinates: 47°19′37″N 29°36′27″E
- Country: Ukraine
- Oblast: Odesa Oblast
- Raion: Rozdilna Raion
- Hromada: Zakharivka settlement hromada
- Village founded: 1793
- Time zone: UTC+2 (EET)
  - Summer (DST): UTC+3 (EEST)

Yosypivka (Ukrainian: Йосипівка) is a village in Rozdilna Raion, Odesa Oblast, Ukraine. It belongs to Zakharivka settlement hromada, one of the hromadas of Ukraine.

Until 18 July 2020, Yosypivka belonged to Zakharivka Raion. The raion was abolished in July 2020 as part of the administrative reform of Ukraine, which reduced the number of raions of Odesa Oblast to seven. The area of Zakharivka Raion was merged into Rozdilna Raion.
