= Maiorske =

Maiorske Майо́рське
- Village
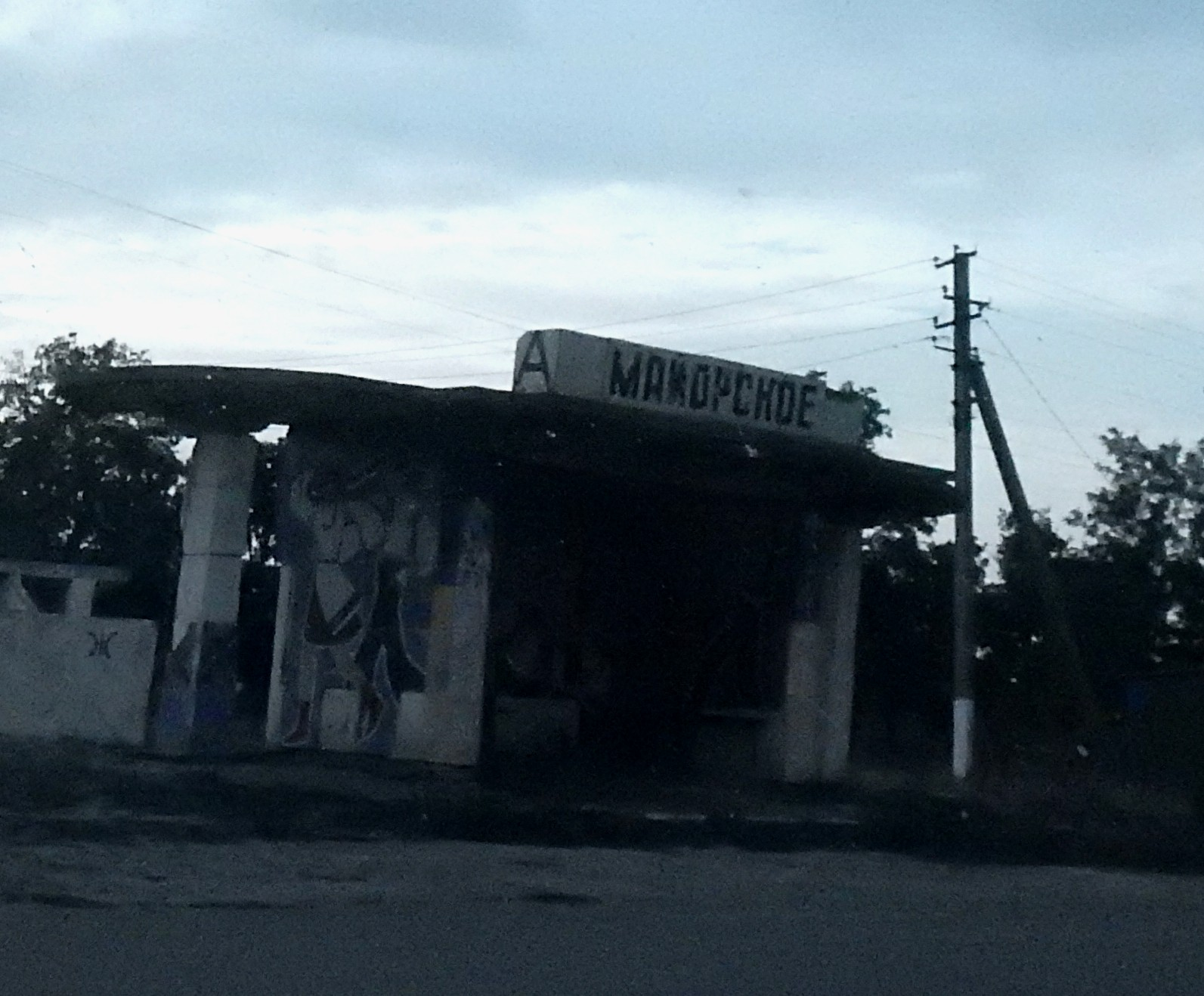
- The bus stop in Maiorske

- Location within Odesa Oblast Location within Ukraine
- Coordinates: 47°16′29″N 29°46′23″E
- Country: Ukraine
- Oblast: Odesa Oblast
- Raion: Rozdilna Raion
- Hromada: Zakharivka settlement hromada
- Founded: 1791

Population (2001)
  - Total: 391

Maiorske (Ukrainian: Майо́рське) is a village in Ukraine, located in Zakharivka settlement hromada, Rozdilna Raion, Odesa Oblast. In 2001, it had a population of 391.

It was founded in 1791. Until 1947, the village was known as Shepterediury (Ukrainian: Шептередюри; Romanian: Șapte Rediuri). It was located in Zakharivka Raion until 17 July 2020, when that raion was merged into Rozdilna Raion in accordance with nationwide administrative reforms.

The Shepteredy landscape reserve - named after the former name of the village - is located nearby, near the border with Moldova.

== Demographics ==
According to the 1989 Soviet census, the village had a population of 371 people, of whom 159 were men and 212 were women.

According to the 2001 Ukrainian census, that number had grown to 391. 97.19% of the village's population spoke Ukrainian, and 2.81% spoke Russian.

== See also ==
- Staromaiorske
- Novomaiorske
