= Zakharivka Raion =

Former subdivision of Odesa Oblast, Ukraine

Zakharivka Raion Захарівський район
- Raion
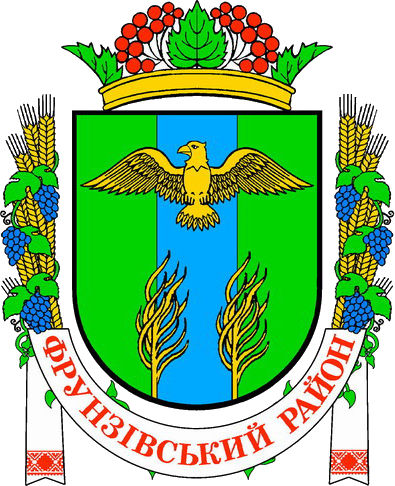
- Flag Coat of arms

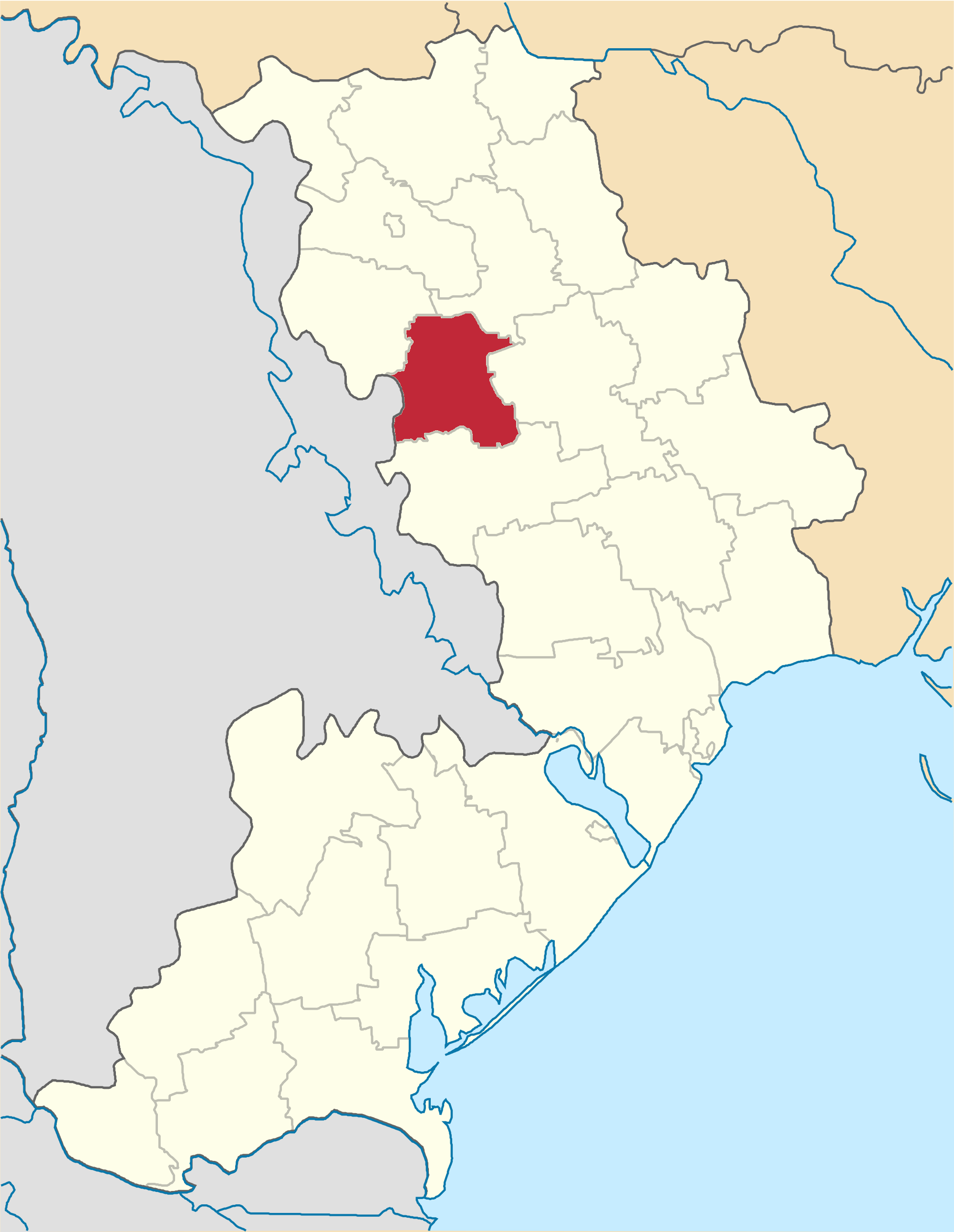
- Coordinates: 47°20′25″N 29°45′42″E
- Country: Ukraine
- Oblast: Odesa Oblast
- Established: 1923
- Disestablished: 18 July 2020
- Admin. center: Zakharivka
- Subdivisions: List: — city councils; — settlement councils; — rural councils; Number of localities: — cities; — urban-type settlements; 51 — villages; — rural settlements

Area
  - Total: 956 km^{2} (369 sq mi)

Population (2020)
  - Total: 19,824
  - Density: 20.7/km^{2} (53.7/sq mi)
- Time zone: UTC+02:00 (EET)
  - Summer (DST): UTC+03:00 (EEST)
- Postal index: 66700—66744
- Area code: +380-4860

Zakharivka Raion (Ukrainian: Захарівський район); (Russian: Захаровский район), until May 2016 Frunzivka Raion (Ukrainian: Фрунзівський район, Frunzivskyi raion); (Russian: Фрунзовский район, Frunzovskyi raion), was a raion (district) in Odesa Oblast in southwestern Ukraine. The administrative center of the raion was the urban-type settlement of Zakharivka. According to the 2001 census, the majority of the Frunzivka district's population spoke Ukrainian (92.09%), with Romanian (4.07%) and Russian (3.22%) speakers in the minority. The raion was abolished and its territory was merged into Rozdilna Raion on 18 July 2020 as part of the administrative reform of Ukraine, which reduced the number of raions of Odesa Oblast to seven. The last estimate of the raion population was 19,824 (2020 est.).

On 19 May 2016, Verkhovna Rada adopted decision to rename Frunzivka to Zakharivka and Frunzivka Raion to Zakharivka Raion conform to the law prohibiting names of Communist origin.

== Subdivisions ==
At the time of disestablishment, the raion consisted of two hromadas:

- Zakharivka rural hromada with the administration in Zakharivka;
- Zatyshshia settlement hromada with the administration in the urban-type settlement of Zatyshshia.

Zakharivka Raion consisted of 2 urban-type settlements (Zakharivka and Zatyshshia) and 51 villages. The settlements of Zakharivka Raion were:

- Andrusova (Андрусова)
- Balashove (Балашове)
- Birnosove (Бірносове)
- Bohdanove Pershe (Богданове Перше)
- Chervona Stinka (Червона Стінка)
- Dementivka (Дементівка)
- Druzheliubivka (Дружелюбівка)
- Fedosiivka (Федосіївка)
- Hederymove Pershe (Гедеримове Перше)
- Hirkivka (Гірківка)
- Hlybokoiar (Глибокояр)
- Ivanivka (Іванівка)
- Karabanove (Карабанове)
- Kosharka (Кошарка)
- Krasnopil (Краснопіль)
- Krympulka (Кримпулька)
- Lenine (Леніне)
- Maiorske (Майорське)
- Mala Toporivka (Мала Топорівка)
- Maloroshove (Малорошове)
- Marianivka (Мар'янівка)
- Nova Hryhorivka (Нова Григорівка)
- Nova Shybka (Нова Шибка)
- Novomykolaivka (Новомиколаївка)
- Novopavlivka (Новопавлівка)
- Novozaritske (Новозаріцьке)
- Olenivka (Оленівка)
- Onylove (Онилове)
- Pavlivka (Павлівка)
- Parkanivka (Парканівка)
- Perekhrestove (Перехрестове)
- Perekhrestove Pershe (Перехрестове Перше)
- Pervomaiske (Первомайське)
- Pershe Travnia (Перше Травня)
- Petrivka (Marianivka Village Council) (Петрівка (Мар'янівська сільська рада))
- Petrivka (Perekhrestove Village Council) (Петрівка (Перехрестівська сільська рада))
- Rosiianivka (Росіянівка)
- Samiilivka (Самійлівка)
- Savchynske (Савчинське)
- Skyneshory (Скинешори)
- Stoianove (Стоянове)
- Untylivka (Унтилівка)
- Vasylivka (Василівка)
- Vesela Balka (Весела Балка)
- Voinycheve (Войничеве)
- Volodymyrivka (Володимирівка)
- Yelyzavetivka (Єлизаветівка)
- Yosypivka (Йосипівка)
- Zahiria (Загір'я)
- Zhyhailove (Жигайлове)
