= Zakharivka =

Rural locality in Odesa Oblast, Ukraine

Zakharivka Захарівка
- Rural settlement
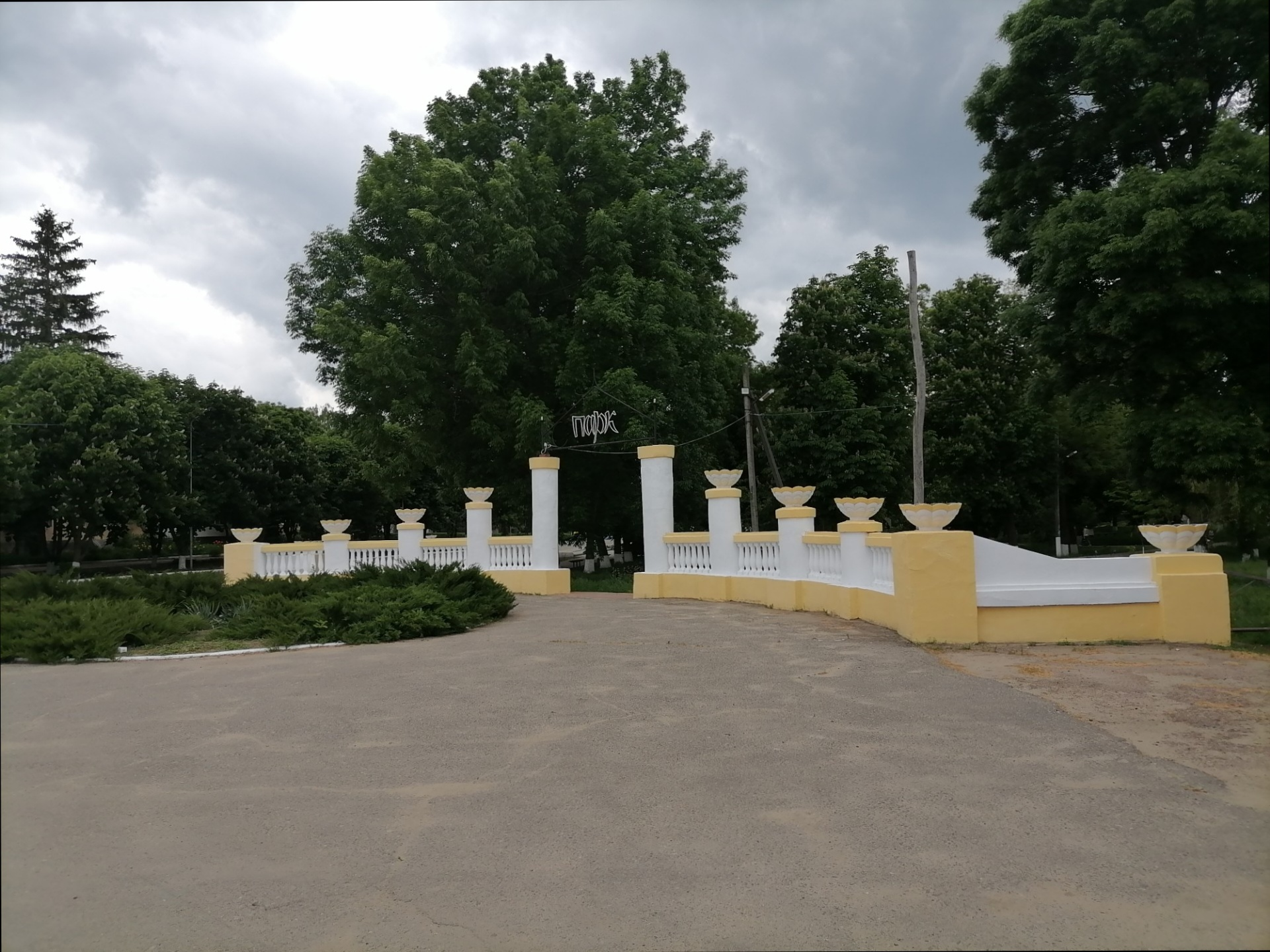
- Park in the center of Zakharivka

- Location in Ukraine Zakharivka (Ukraine)
- Coordinates: 47°19′55″N 29°45′26″E
- Country: Ukraine
- Oblast: Odesa Oblast
- Raion: Rozdilna Raion
- Hromada: Zakharivka settlement hromada
- Founded: 1791

Area
  - Total: 7.60 km^{2} (2.93 sq mi)

Population (2022)
  - Total: 5,142
  - Density: 677/km^{2} (1,750/sq mi)
- Time zone: UTC+3 (+2)
- Postal code: 66702
- Area code: +380 4860

Zakharivka (Ukrainian: Захарівка; from November 7, 1927 to May 19, 2016 - Frunzivka (Ukrainian: Фрунзівка), is a rural settlement in Rozdilna Raion of Odesa Oblast in Ukraine. It hosts the administration of Zakharivka settlement hromada, one of the hromadas of Ukraine. Population: 5,142 (2022 estimate).

Zakharivka is located in the forest steppe zone, in the valley of the drying river Kuchurhan, between the southern spurs of the Podolian Upland.

The regional road R-33 and the territorial road T-1614 pass through the town. The nearest railway station in Zatyshshia, 12 kilometers away.

== Name ==
The name Zakharivka comes from the male name Zakhar.

On the tenth anniversary of the October Revolution – November 7, 1927 – Zakharivka was renamed Frunzivka, in honor of the Soviet military and statesman M.V. Frunze, whose father was born and lived here for a long time.

On 19 May 2016, Verkhovna Rada adopted decision to rename Frunzivka to Zakharivka and Frunzivka Raion to Zakharivka Raion conform to the law prohibiting names of Communist origin.

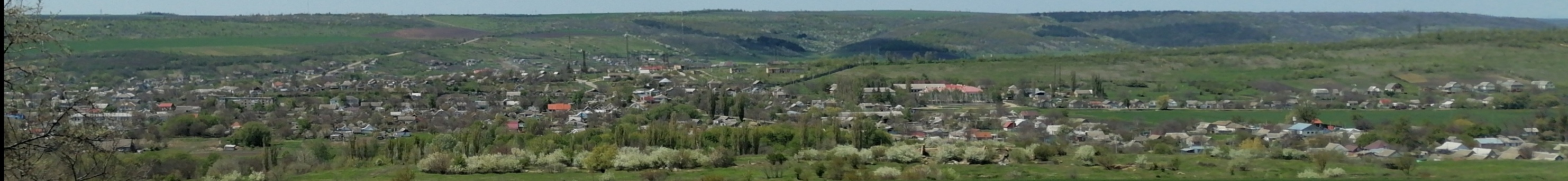
View of the northern part of Zakharivka

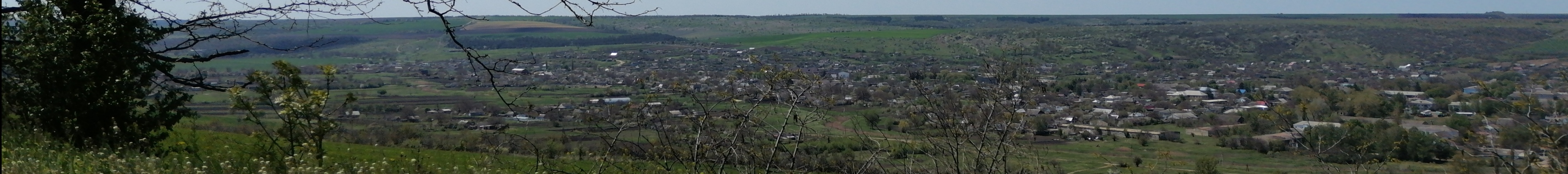
View of the southern part of Zakharivka

== History ==
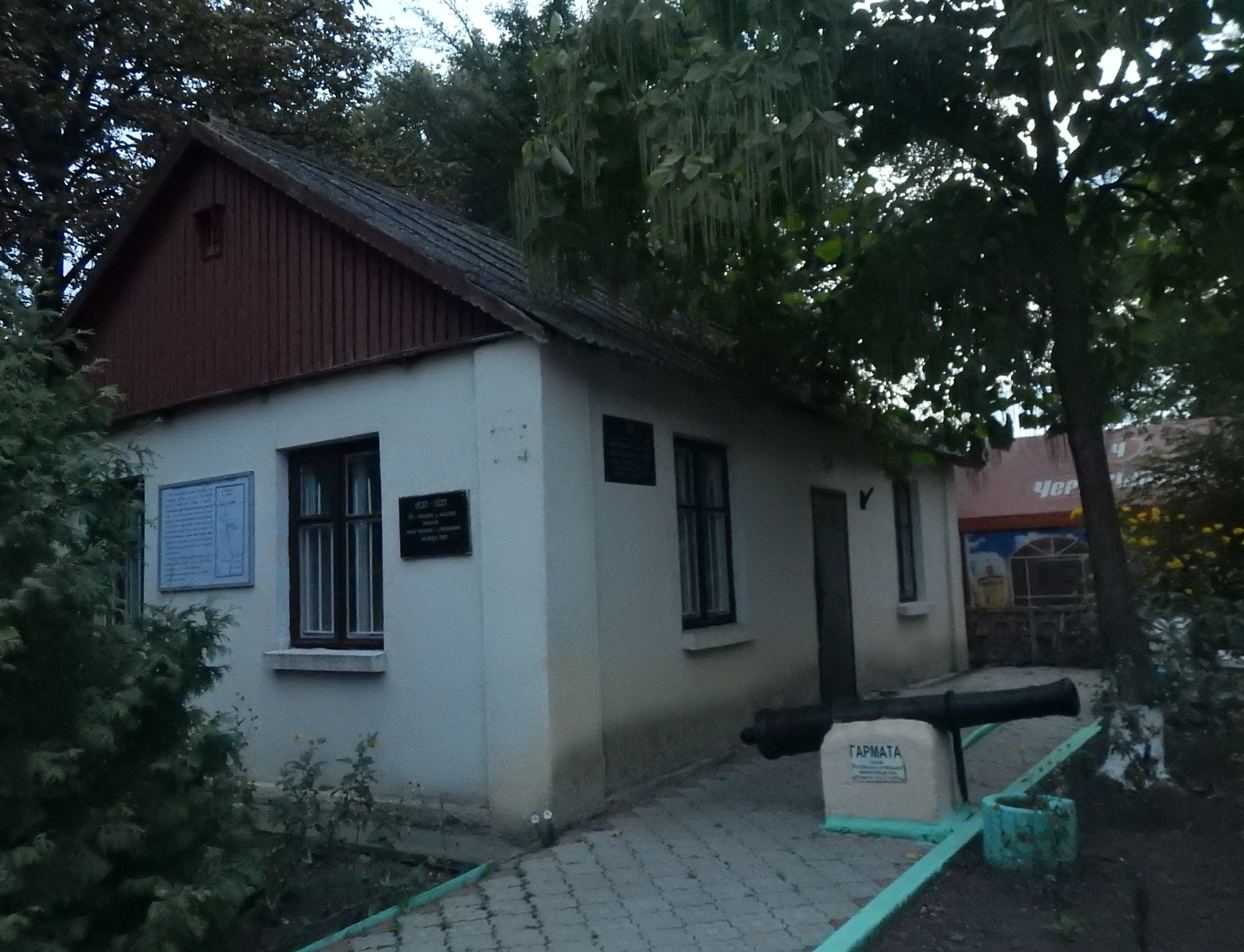
Museum

=== Archeologic finds ===
Remains of a Mesolithic settlement (13,000 years ago) and a large burial ground of the Chernyakhiv culture (3rd–6th centuries AD) were found on the territory of Zakharivka and near it.

=== Ottoman Empire ===
By the end of the eighteenth century, very little was known about this land, captured by the Ottoman Empire. It was believed that it was "desert, waterless and treeless, uninhabitable". However, in 1791, when the lands between the Bug and the Dniester were annexed to the Russian Empire, it turned out that there were some settlements. Zakharivka was one of them. It's believed that it was founded in the second half of the 18th century by Ukrainian and Russian runaway serfs, as well as Moldavians who came here from the Dniester.

=== Russian Empire ===
In 1798, Zakharivka had 78 yards and 249 inhabitants.

In 1843 Zakharivka received the status of a town and became the center of the volost. Fairs were held, large bazaars gathered every week. Along with trade in the town developed a craft - blacksmithing, tailoring, saddlery, hat and more. At the end of the 19th century there were 21 tailors, 12 shoemakers, 12 carpenters, 8 blacksmiths. The vast majority of artisans, as well as small traders, were Jews. They settled on the lands of the prince, paid him rent. The Jewish population of Zakharivka in the late 19th and early 20th centuries was half the population.

As of 1886, 784 people lived in Zakharivka and two villages that are now part of it. In the town of Zakharivka itself, 702 people lived, there were 127 farms, there was a state apartment of the 3rd estate, an Orthodox church, 2 Jewish synagogues, a school, a zemstvo station, 6 shops, a food and wine warehouse, an annual fair and bazaars every 2 weeks on Sundays. In the village of Adamivka lived 50 people, there were 12 farms, there was a steam mill and a brick factory. In the village of Katerynivka lived 32 people, there were 7 farms, there was a wine warehouse.

About 400 residents of Zakharivka were mobilized on the fronts of the First World War. About 100 of them died.

=== Soviet Union ===
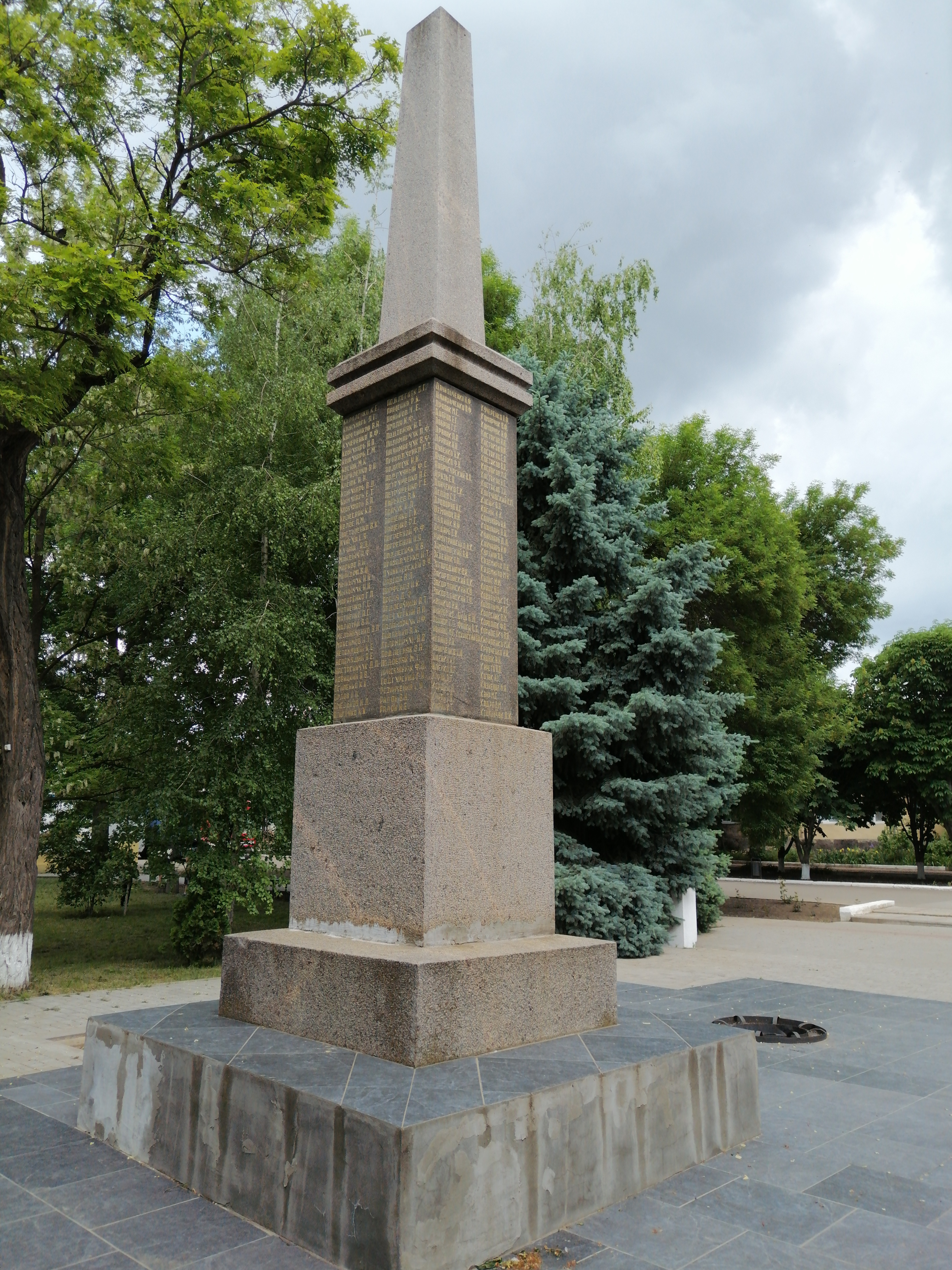
Monument to the inhabitants of Zakharivka who died in the war

From 1923 to 1963 Zakharivka was a village.

During the Second World War, from August 1, 1941 to April 4, 1944, it was under the occupation of the Kingdom of Romania as part of the Transnistria Governorate.

More than 1,000 residents of Zakharivka were drafted into the Red Army. 283 of them died. More than 200 people were awarded orders and medals.

Since 1963 it has been an urban-type settlement.

=== Ukraine ===
In 2001, the population was 5,111.

Until 18 July 2020, Zakharivka was the administrative center of Zakharivka Raion. The raion was abolished in July 2020 as part of the administrative reform of Ukraine, which reduced the number of raions of Odesa Oblast to seven. The area of Zakharivka Raion was merged into Rozdilna Raion.

Since 2020, Zakharivka is the center of the newly formed Zakharivka settlement hromada, which covers most of the Zakharivka district.

Until 26 January 2024, Zakharivka was designated urban-type settlement. On this day, a new law entered into force which abolished this status, and Zakharivka became a rural settlement.
