= Zakharivka settlement hromada =

Coordinates: 47°19′N 29°45′E

Zakharivka settlement hromada Захарівська селищна громада
- Hromada
- Interactive map of Zakharivka settlement hromada
- Country: Ukraine
- Oblast: Odesa Oblast
- Raion: Rozdilna Raion
- Admin. center: Zakharivka

Area
  - Total: 721 km^{2} (278 sq mi)

Population (2022)
  - Total: 13,001
  - Density: 18.0/km^{2} (46.7/sq mi)
- CATOTTG code: UA51140070000052649
- Settlements: 37
- Rural settlements: 1
- Villages: 36

Zakharivka settlement hromada (Ukrainian: Захарівська селищна громада) is a hromada in Rozdilna Raion of Odesa Oblast in southwestern Ukraine. Population: 13,001 (2022 estimate)

The hromada consists of a rural settlement of Zakharivka and 36 villages:

- Balashove
- Birnosove
- Bohdanove Pershe (unpopulated since 2000s)
- Bolharka
- Chervona Stinka
- Hirkivka
- Hlybokoyar
- Davydivka
- Dementivka
- Fedosiivka
- Karabanove
- Kosharka
- Krympulka
- Maiorske
- Mala Toporivka
- Maryanivka
- Nova Shybka
- Novozaritske
- Novomykolaivka
- Novopavlivka
- Olenivka
- Onylove
- Pavlivka
- Parkanivka
- Pershe Travnia
- Petrivka
- Roziyanivka
- Savchynske
- Samiilivka
- Stoianove
- Untylivka
- Vasylivka
- Voinycheve
- Yelyzavetivka
- Yosypivka
- Zhyhailove

== Links ==
- https://decentralization.gov.ua/newgromada/4334#
