= Staromaiorske =

Staromaiorske Старомайорське
- Village
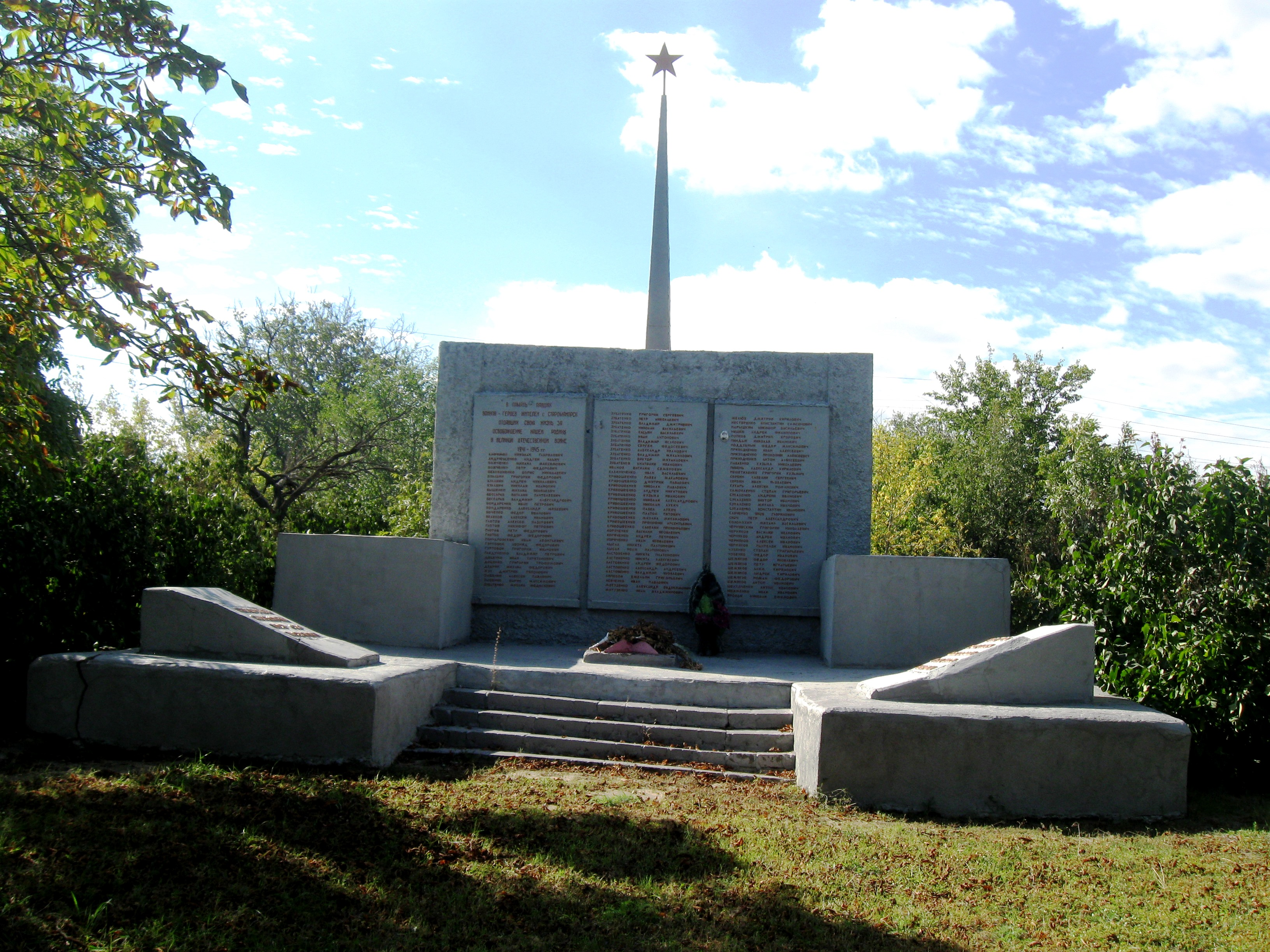
- The village World War II memorial in 2018
- Interactive map of Staromaiorske
- Location within Donetsk Oblast Location within Ukraine
- Coordinates: 47°45′10″N 36°47′37″E
- Country: Ukraine
- Oblast: Donetsk Oblast
- Raion: Volnovakha Raion
- Hromada: Velyka Novosilka settlement hromada

Population (2001 census)
  - Total: 839
- Time zone: UTC+2 (EET)
  - Summer (DST): UTC+3 (EEST)
- KATOTTH: UA14040010180012001

Staromaiorske (Ukrainian: Старомайорське [ˌstɑromɐˈjɔrsʲke]; Russian: Старомайорское, romanized: Staromayorskoye) is a village in Volnovakha Raion, Donetsk Oblast, eastern Ukraine. It is situated south of the village of Makarivka and on the opposite side of the Mokri Yaly river from the village of Urozhaine. The population at the 2001 census was 839.

== History ==
The village was founded in the early 18th century as a Cossack settlement of the Zaporozhian Sich.

=== Russo-Ukrainian War ===
==== Russian invasion of Ukraine ====
During the Russian invasion of Ukraine, the village was occupied by Russian forces for over a year. On 27 July 2023, the village was liberated by the 35th Marine Brigade and 7th Battalion Arei of the Ukrainian Volunteer Army of the 129th Kryvyi Rih Defense Brigade of the Territorial Defense Forces in the 2023 Ukrainian counteroffensive.

According to Reuters, the village was under Ukrainian control as of 31 July 2023. By the end of the fighting, the village was largely "ruined".

On 10 June 2024, the Russian Armed Forces recaptured the village.

== Demographics ==
According to the 2001 Ukrainian census, 62.62% of the population of the village spoke Ukrainian, 37.14% spoke Russian and 0.24% spoke Belarusian.

== See also ==
- Maiorske
- Novomaiorske
