= Zatyshshia =

Rural locality in Odesa Oblast, Ukraine

Zatyshshia Затишшя
- Rural settlement
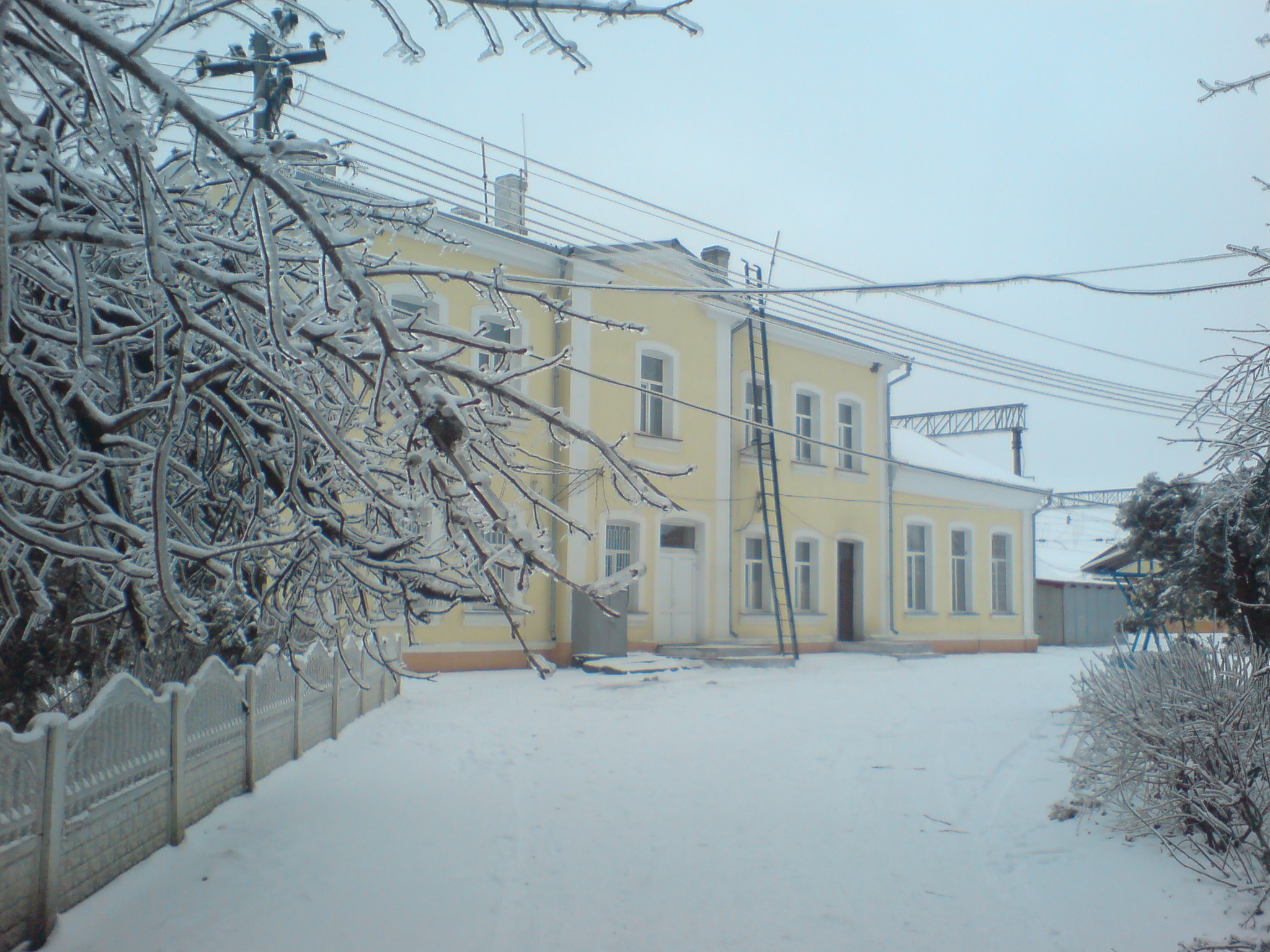

- Location in Ukraine Zatyshshia (Ukraine)
- Coordinates: 47°20′7″N 29°52′15″E
- Country: Ukraine
- Oblast: Odesa Oblast
- Raion: Rozdilna Raion
- Hromada: Zatyshshia settlement hromada
- Founded: 1865

Area
  - Total: 5.94 km^{2} (2.29 sq mi)
  - Water: 0.02 km^{2} (0.0077 sq mi)
- Elevation: 192 m (630 ft)

Population (2022)
  - Total: 3,488
  - Density: 587/km^{2} (1,520/sq mi)
- Time zone: UTC+3 (+2)
- Postal code: 66740
- Area code: +380 4860
- Website: http://zatyshanska.gromada.org.ua

Zatyshshia (Ukrainian: Затишшя; Russian: Затишье) is a rural settlement in Rozdilna Raion of Odesa Oblast in Ukraine. It hosts the administration of Zatyshshia settlement hromada, one of the hromadas of Ukraine. Population: 3,488 (2022 estimate)

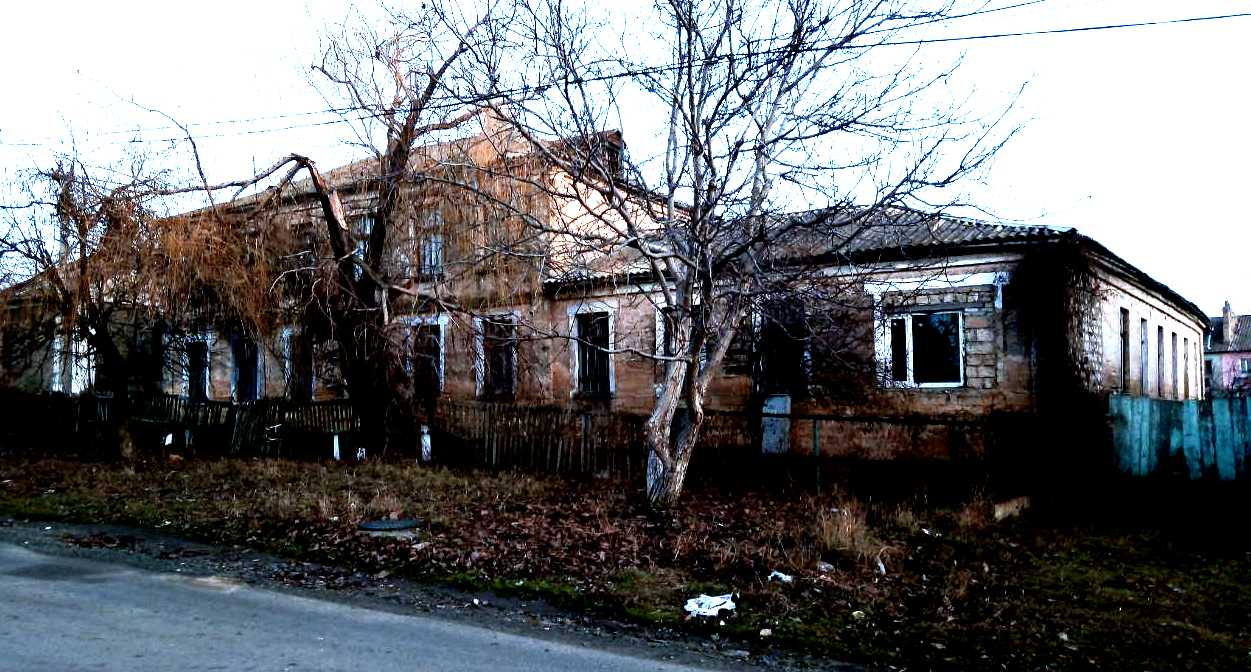
Dwelling house, XIX century

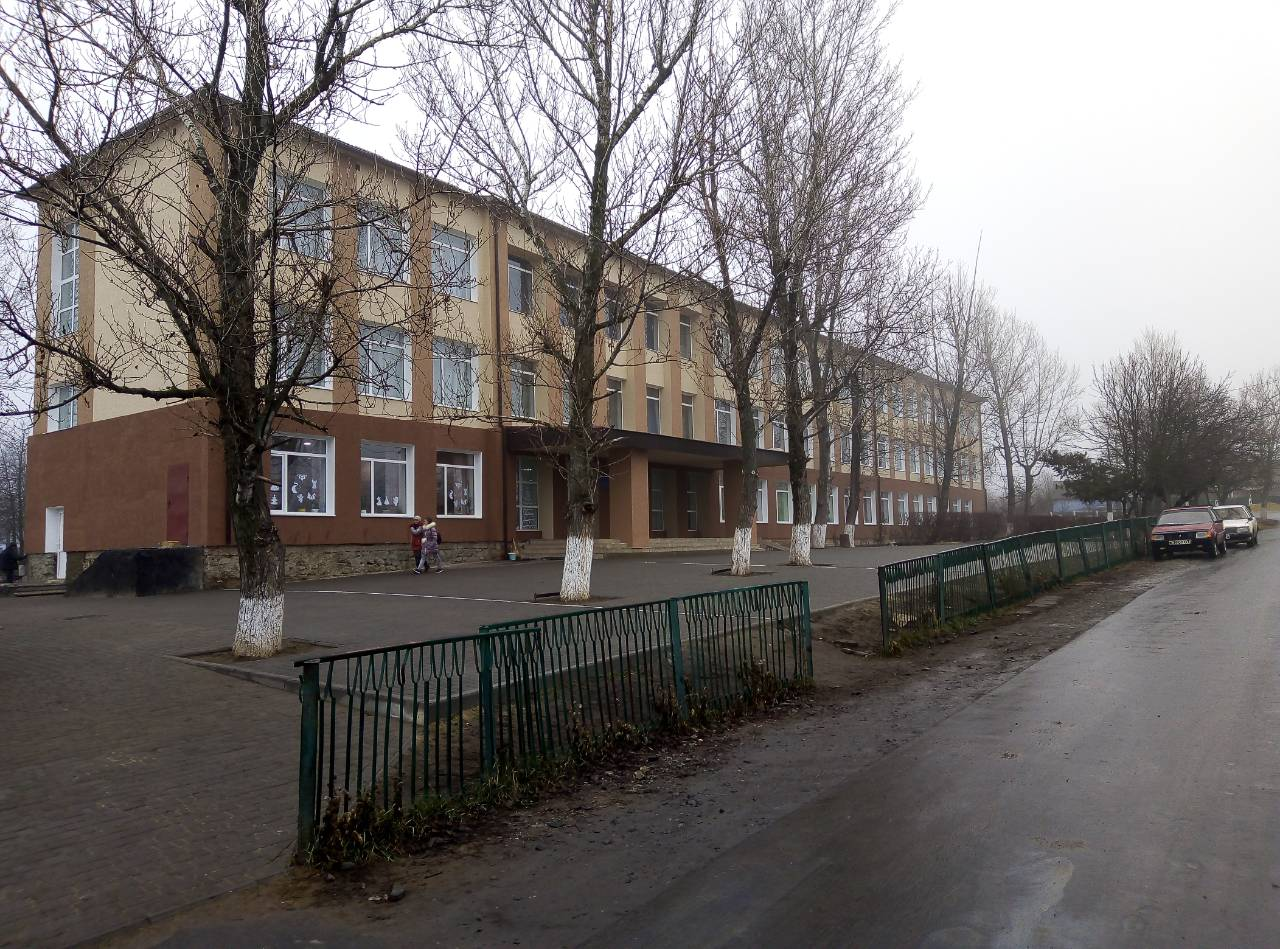
"Big" school, 1964

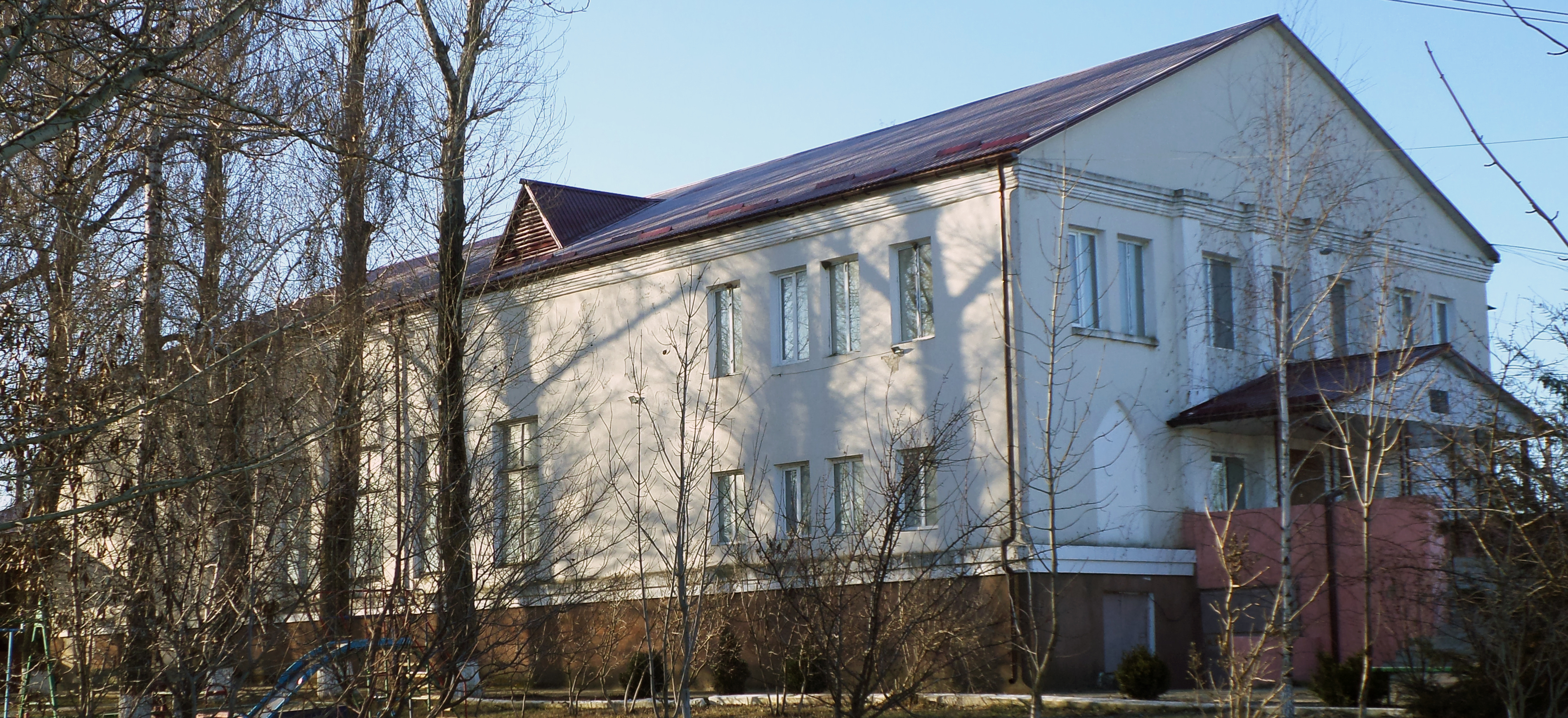
House of Culture, 1967

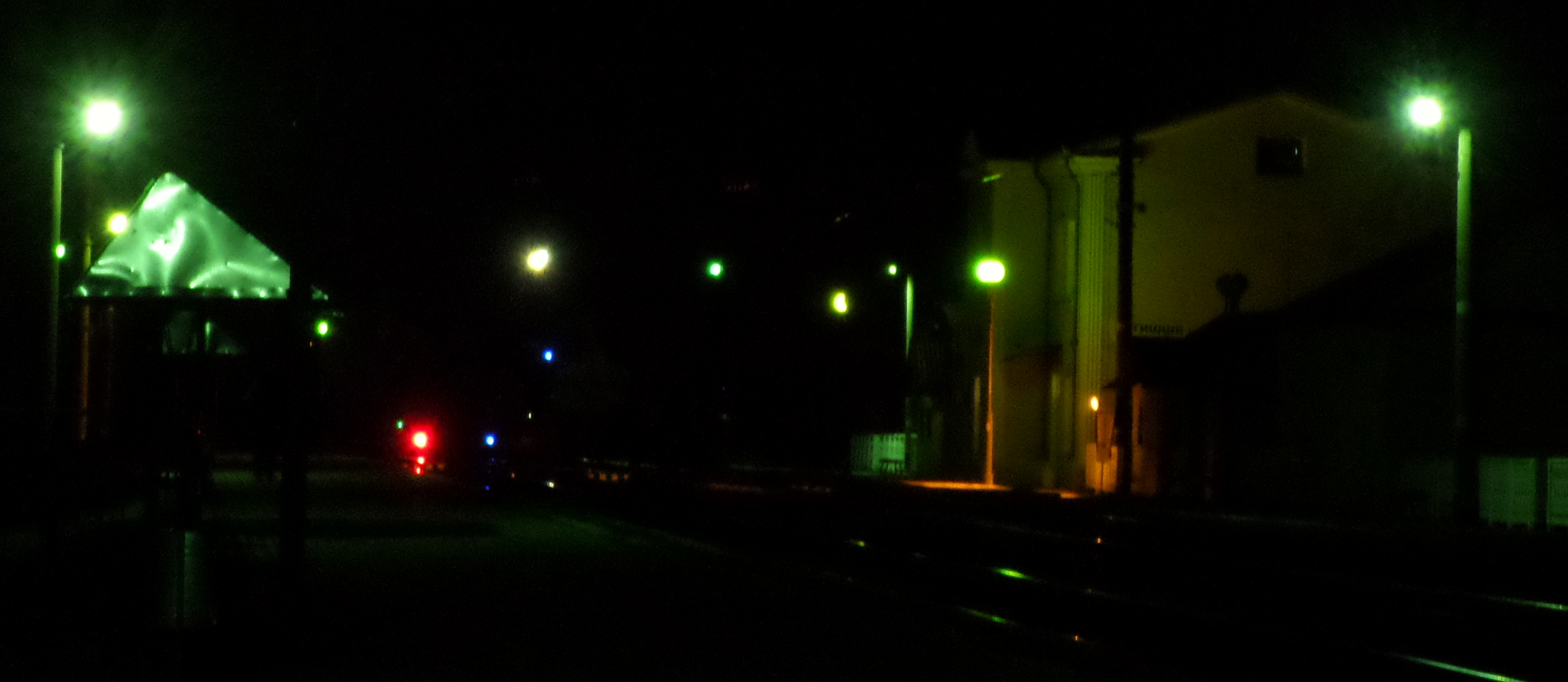
Railway station at night

The settlement has a railway station on the line Odesa—Kyiv (stretch Rozdilna—Podilsk).

The distance to Odesa is 72 miles, to Chișinău it is 53 miles.

== Name ==
The word "Zatyshshia" doesn't have an exact analogue in the English language, it's close in meaning to the word "silence" or "calm" and means: temporary calming, suspension, weakening of any action, movement, development; temporary cessation of wind; temporary cessation of noise, movement; secluded living place, corner.

The name, for several reasons, most likely comes from the features of the relief:

1.) The place occupying a significant part of the modern settlement is protected from the wind by the relief.

2.) During the construction of the railway to the south from Zatyshshia for a long distance, a large amount of land work was required, and to the north it was almost not required at all.

== Population ==
1876 — 73; 1970 — 3771; 1979 — 3812; 1989 — 3461; 2001 — 3470; 2015 — 3571; 2016 — 3576; 2017 — 3556; 2018 — 3547; 2019 — 3538; 2020 — 3537; 2021 — 3516.

According to the 2001 census, 95.6 percent of residents indicated their native language as Ukrainian; 3.6% as Russian; 0.5% - Moldovan; 0.1% - Bulgarian and 0.1% - Belarusian.

== History ==
=== Archaeological finds ===
Near the town are the remains of a late Paleolithic settlement (40—13 thousands years ago), and burial mound from the Bronze Age (2nd millennium BC).

=== Russian Empire ===
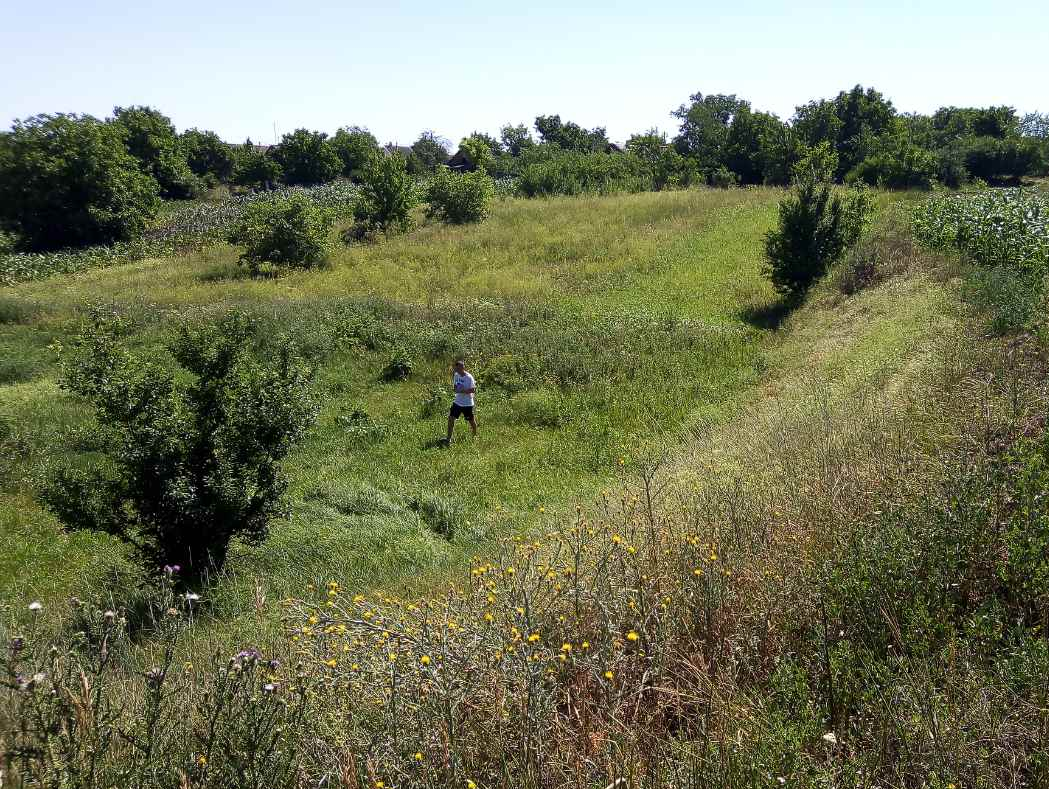
Dam pond of a nearby hamlet, 1863

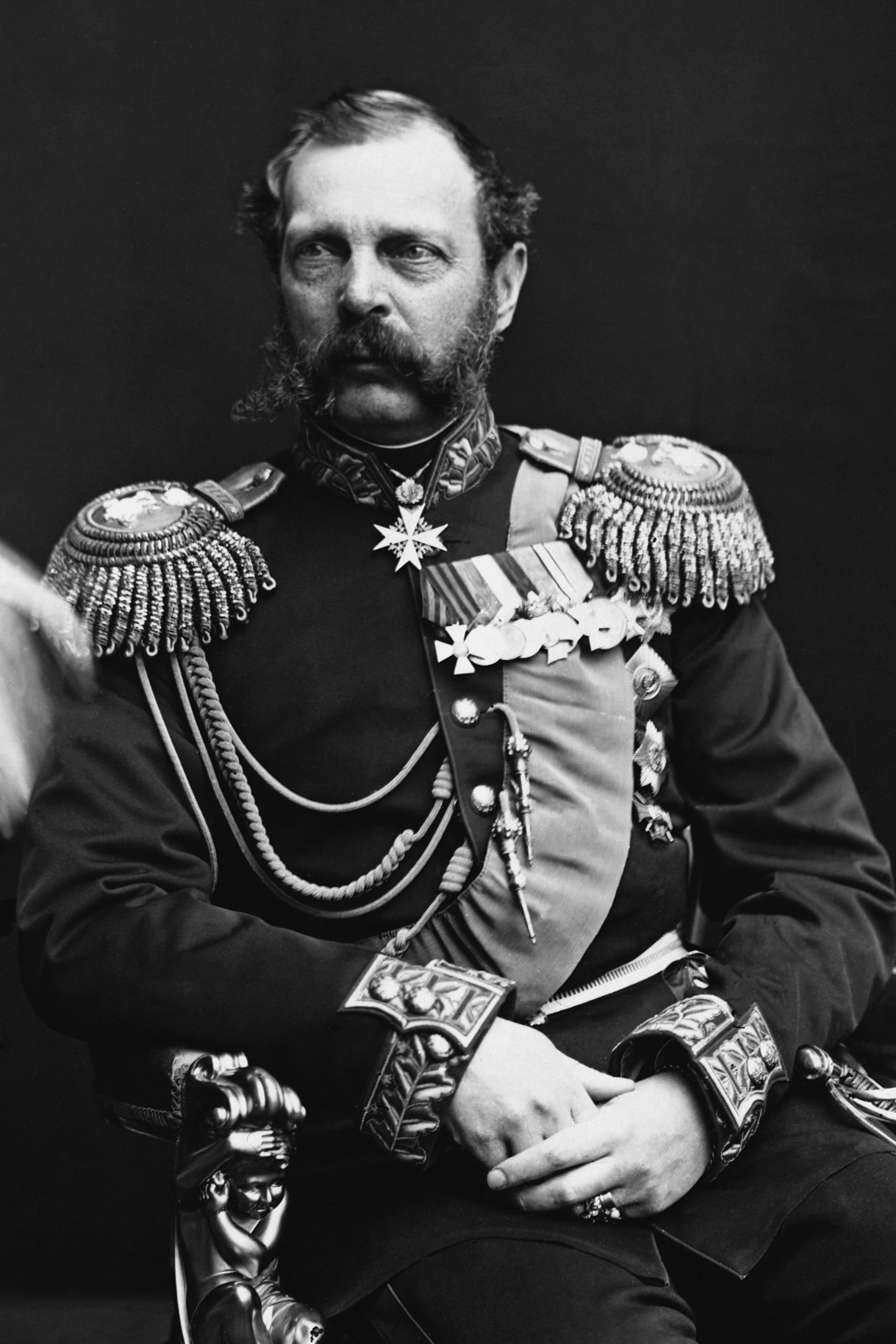
Alexander II

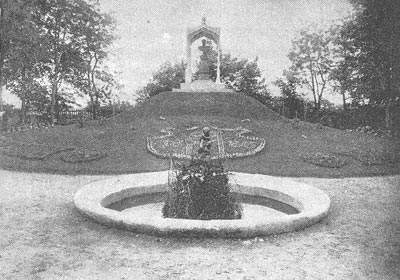
Monument to Alexander II and the fountain, 1885

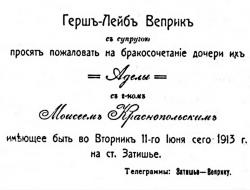
Invitation to wedding in Zatyshshia, 1913

The town of Zatyshshia was founded in 1865, as a railway station, together with opening of the first railway in the part of Ukraine that was under the rule of the Russian Empire, the Odesa—Balta.

During the times of the Russian Empire, the settlement included the station itself with a small, but urban development and 2 hamlets by ponds, located at a distance of 0.65 and 2.4 kilometers in the southwest direction. The more distant hamlet ceased to exist in the 1890s.

The station part of the settlement consisted of the buildings of the railway station, post office, telegraph office, shop, tavern, various warehouses, etc. Of the residential buildings, there was one apartment two-storey house and 5 one-storey houses with 2 apartments each. The population of these houses in 1876 was 73 people.

Lined with cobblestones streets Torhova, Suvorova, Centralna, the old railway crossing, access roads to various objects and the road to Zakharivka.

In 1895-1896, the landowner V.I. Stanilevych excavated a Bronze Age mound here.

On September 9, 1896, Pavlo Mykhailovych Bazylevsky, a cornet general (head) of the UPR Army in exile, was born in Zatyshshia.

Zatyshshia was visited by the Russian Emperor Alexander II. In 1885, 4 years after his death, a monument to him was erected here, destroyed during the Civil War.

In 1910 the first church was built. In 1911 a parish school was built nearby.

The infrastructure of that time allowed the inhabitants of the settlements of this area to organize festive events here, where it was convenient to get guests from Odesa.

During the time of the Russian Empire, this territory belonged to Tiraspolsky Uyezd of Kherson Governorate.

=== Ukrainian People's Republic, Ukrainian State, Civil War ===
In the surrounding villages, there were many who wanted to settle near the station, because it was convenient, but they could not do it due to bureaucratic obstacles. With the fall of royal power, they were given this opportunity. The settlement began to quickly turn into a village, and with the advent of Soviet power, Zatyshshia received the status of a village. It was in this status in 1923-1964.

After February Revolution as part of the Russian Republic (proclaimed September 14, 1917).

From November 1917 as part of the Ukrainian People's Republic. (As a result of the actions of the UPR in response to the October Revolution).

From the beginning of February 1918 as part of the Odesa Soviet Republic. (As a result of the Red Guards offensive).

From the first part of March 1918 again as part of the UPR. (As a result of the offensive of the Austro-Hungarian army, after the conclusion of the UPR an exclusive protectorate treaty with the Central Powers).

After the coup d'etat of April 29, 1918 as part of the Ukrainian State.

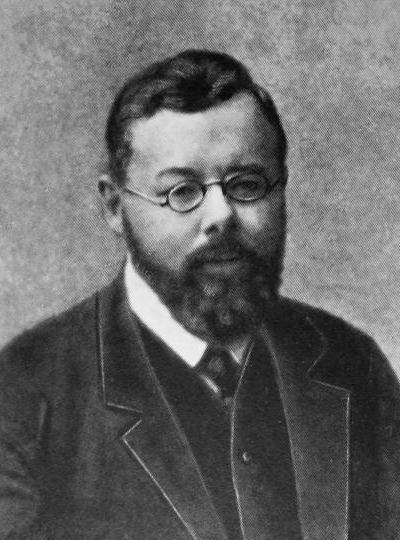
Mikhail Ivanovich Tugan-Baranovskij

From december 1918 again a member of the UPR. (As a result of the overthrow of the power of Hetman Skoropadskyi, after the defeat of the Central Powers in World War I ).

On January 21, 1919, Mikhail Ivanovich Tugan-Baranovsky, who headed a financial mission in the delegation of the Directorate of Ukraine, which was heading for the Paris Peace Conference, died of a heart attack near the station. Buried in Odesa.

From the end of March 1919 it was a part of the Ukrainian Soviet Socialist Republic. (As a result of the Red Army offensive).

From the end of August 1919, the territory where Zatyshshia is located was separated from the main territory of the Soviet republics by the territories of the Ukrainian People's Republic and the Armed Forces of South Russia, and in fact did not belong to any state entity and was not controlled by anyone.

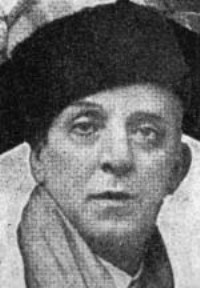
Mykola Arkas

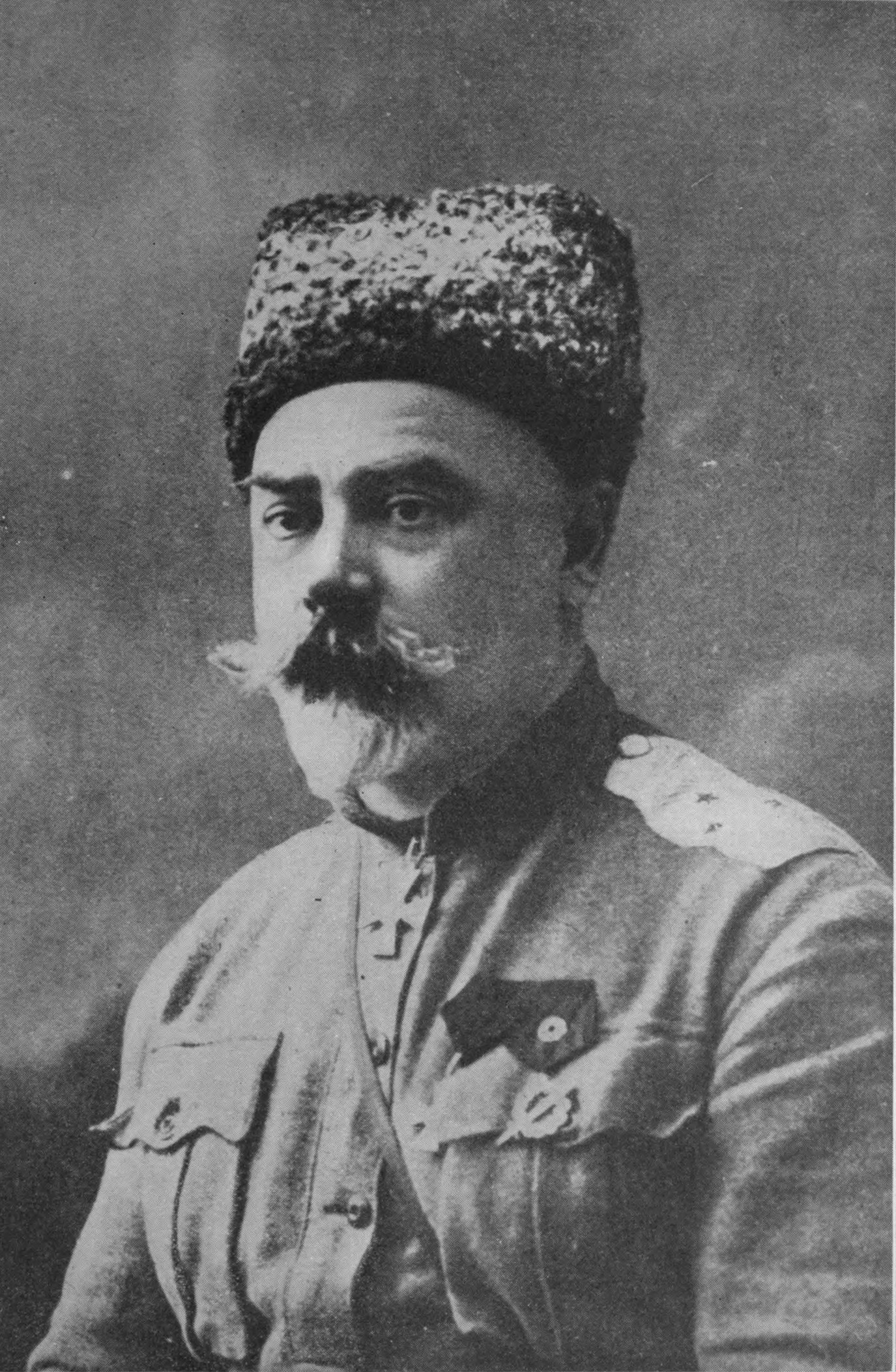
Anton Denikin

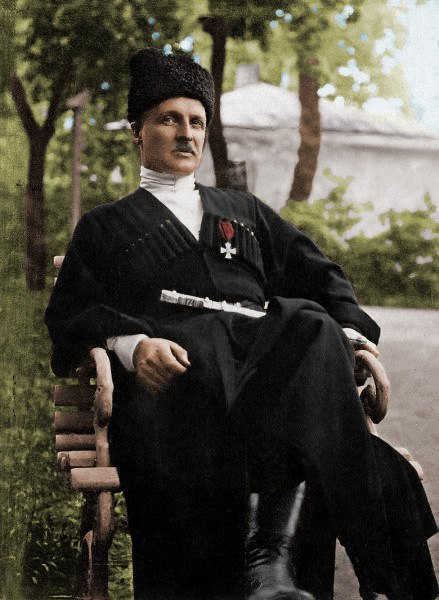
Pavlo Skoropadsky

As a result of the peaceful division of this territory, Zatyshshia became the extreme point of controlled Armed Forces of South Russia, which came from the south. AFSR sent 326 well-armed soldiers here. They had 2 guns, 16 machine guns, 380 horses, a train with 29 cars. The commander of the group was Captain Lyashkov. The group sent by the Ukrainian People's Republic stopped at Perekhrestove station, the closest north of Zatyshshia. There were more than 300 soldiers in the group, but less than a third of them were armed. The regiment had three machine guns, one of which was defective. The group was commanded by Colonel Mykola Arkas. The first contacts between the representatives of the two armies were quite peaceful. The commanders met and assured each other of friendship and alliance. But a few days later, on the night of September 14, for contradictory reasons and under contradictory circumstances, Ukrainian soldiers captured and disarmed the White Army. Captain Lyashkov, who was convinced of Arkas's peacefulness and therefore did not take security measures, publicly shot himself. Arkas ordered to bury him with honors. On the same day, the commander of the White Army, Anton Denikin, ordered an offensive against the UPR Army. It was accepted to consider that the outbreak of war was more favorable to the "White" Army, so Mykola Arkas was declared a traitor by order of the army of the UPR. Most of his regiment later returned to the UPR army. Hetman Pavlo Skoropadskyi, who was personally acquainted with Arkas, described this episode in detail in his memoirs.

From then until February 1920 a member of the South Russia.

=== Pre-war USSR ===
From February 1920 again a member of the Ukrainian Soviet Socialist Republic, and with the formation of the Soviet Union on December 30, 1922, it was part of it.

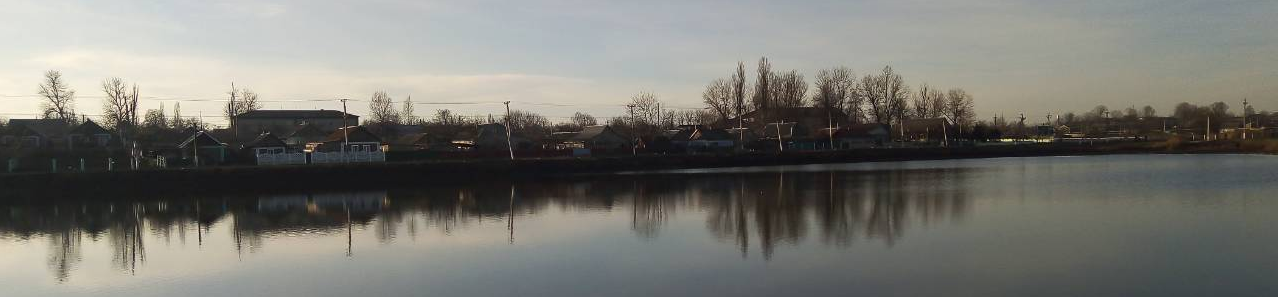
A pond in Zatyshshia, built in the 1920s

In the 1920s, the settlement began to be actively developed, a new school was opened, a new pond was built upstream.

In May 1921, the Agricultural Society "Batrak" was organized in Zatyshsha. On November 9, the same year, it was renamed to "Vesna" (Spring).

In 1923, a party cell and a Komsomol organization were established. The village council was opened.

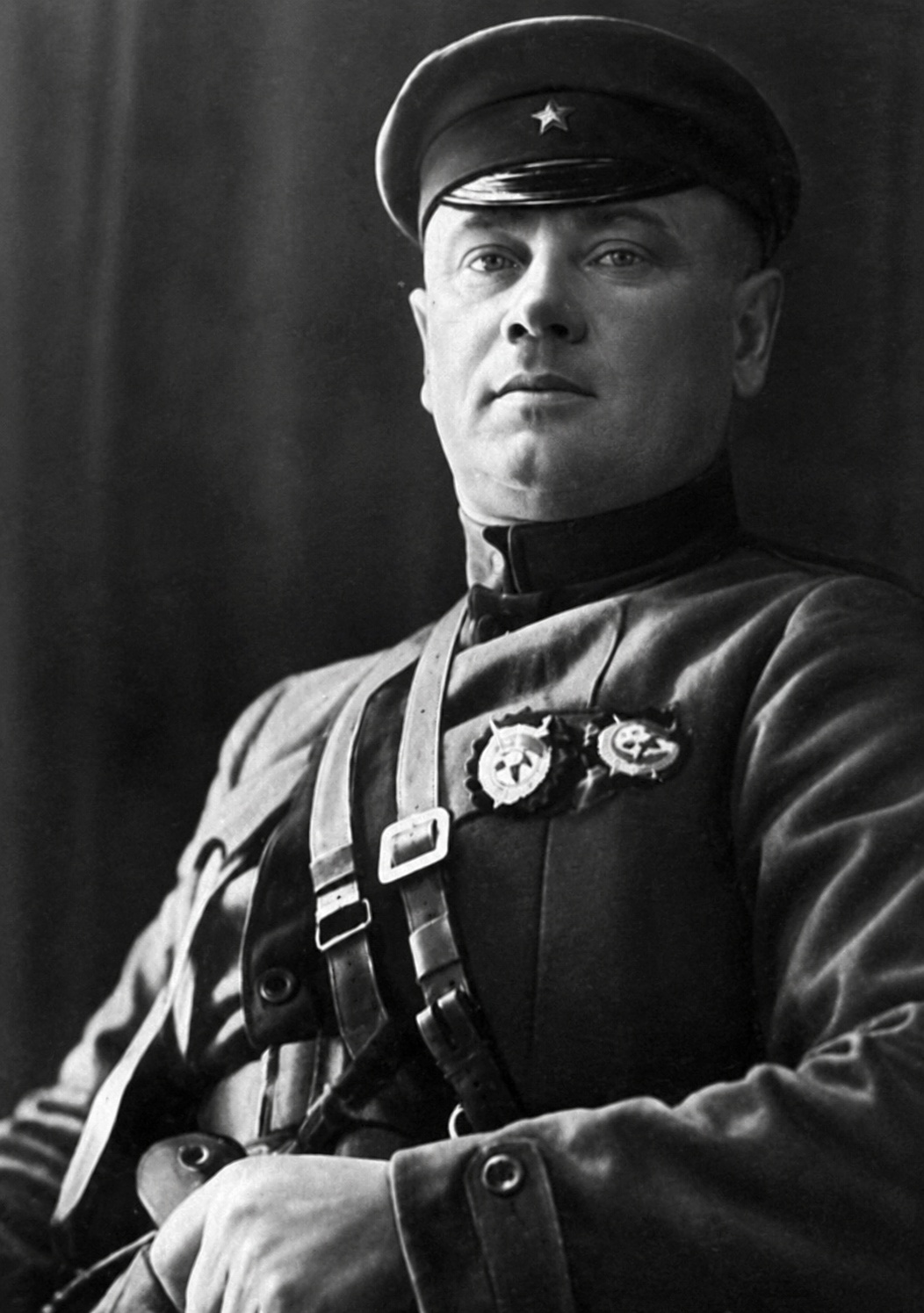
Grigory Kotovsky

On August 11, 1925, in Zatyshshia took place one of the farewell ceremonies of Grigory Ivanovich Kotovsky, one of the most famous Red military figures of the Civil War. His body was transported by rail from Odesa to the mausoleum at the station Birzula in the MASSR (now Podilsk).

In 1926, an elevator for 100,000 poods was built.

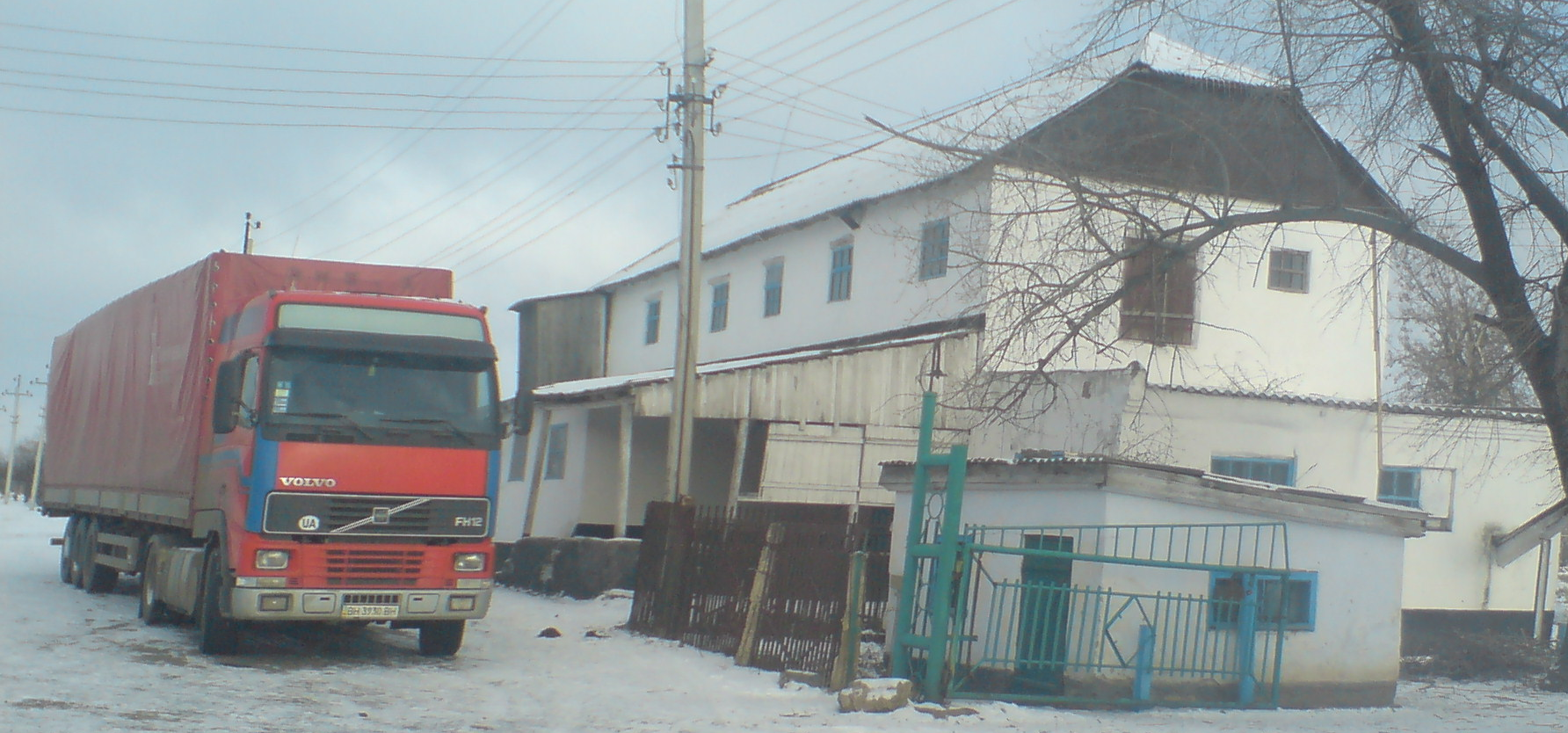
The mill was built in the 1930s

In 1930, a machine-tractor station was organized.

Zatyshshia was relatively unaffected by Holodomor of 1932-1933.

In April 1938, the station was used (48 cars) to evict 141 families (463 people) repressed from Frunzivka Raion to the Kazakh SSR.

In 1939, the tractor drivers of Zatyshshian machine-tractor station took part in the All-Union Agricultural Exhibition.

As of 1941, there were 17 streets and alleys and 121 yards in Zatyshshia. There was a village council, an elevator, a machine-tractor station and a workshop, a district procurement office, a collective farm, forestry, a pharmacy, an outpatient clinic, and a secondary school.

=== World War II, Kingdom of Romania ===
During the Second World War, from August 8, 1941 to April 3, 1944, it was under the occupation of the Kingdom of Romania as part of the Transnistria Governorate. Both in 1941 and in 1944 Zatyshshia was taken as a result of active fighting.

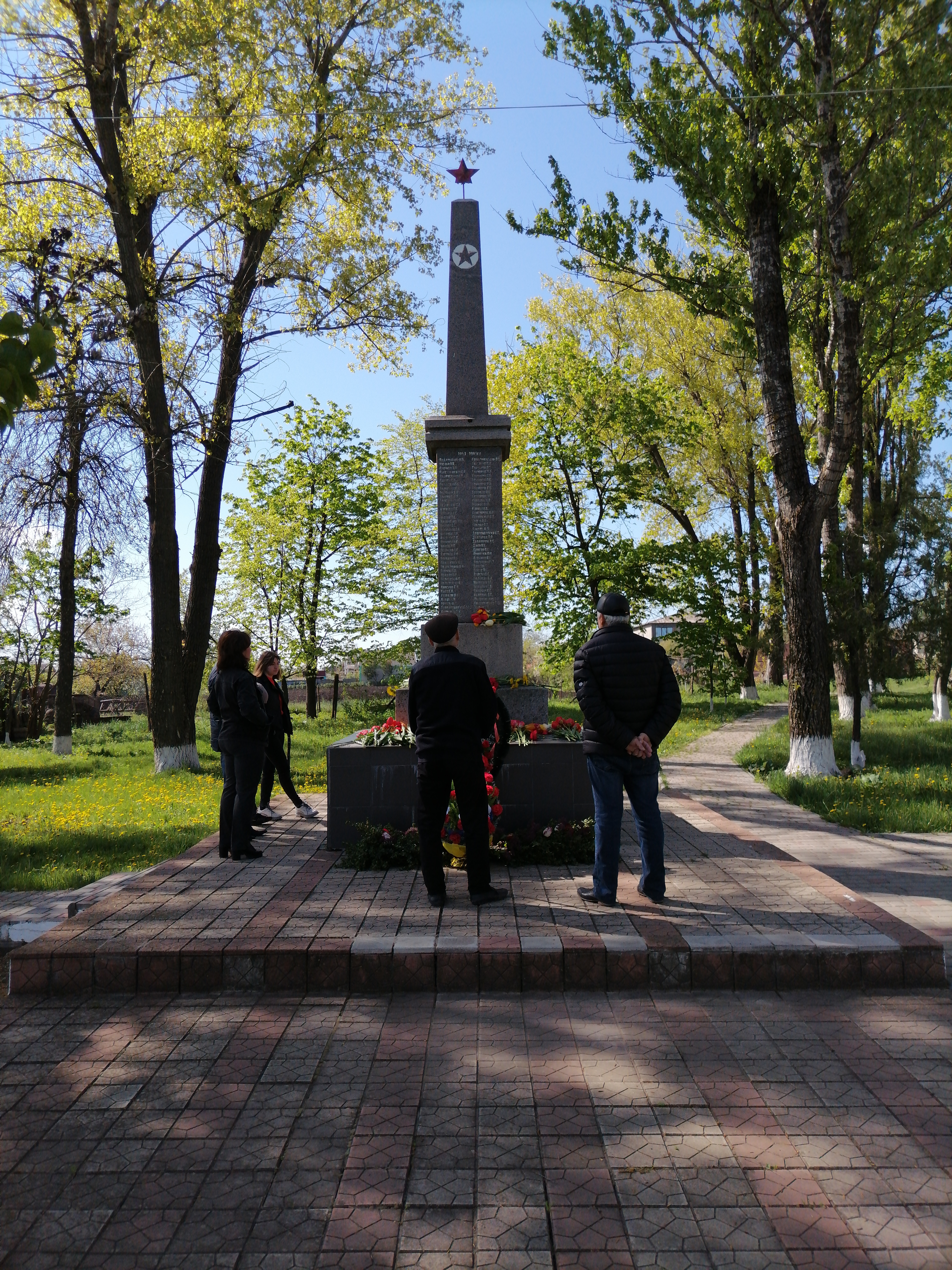
Monument to the inhabitants of Zatyshshia who died in the war (1964)

During the occupation, there were two demonstrative shootings of civilians in Central Square. The first time it was the students of the local school, whom the teacher persuaded to resist the occupation and he himself, in 1941. The second time, the members of the secret Komsomol organization - 17 16-year-old boys and girls in 1942.

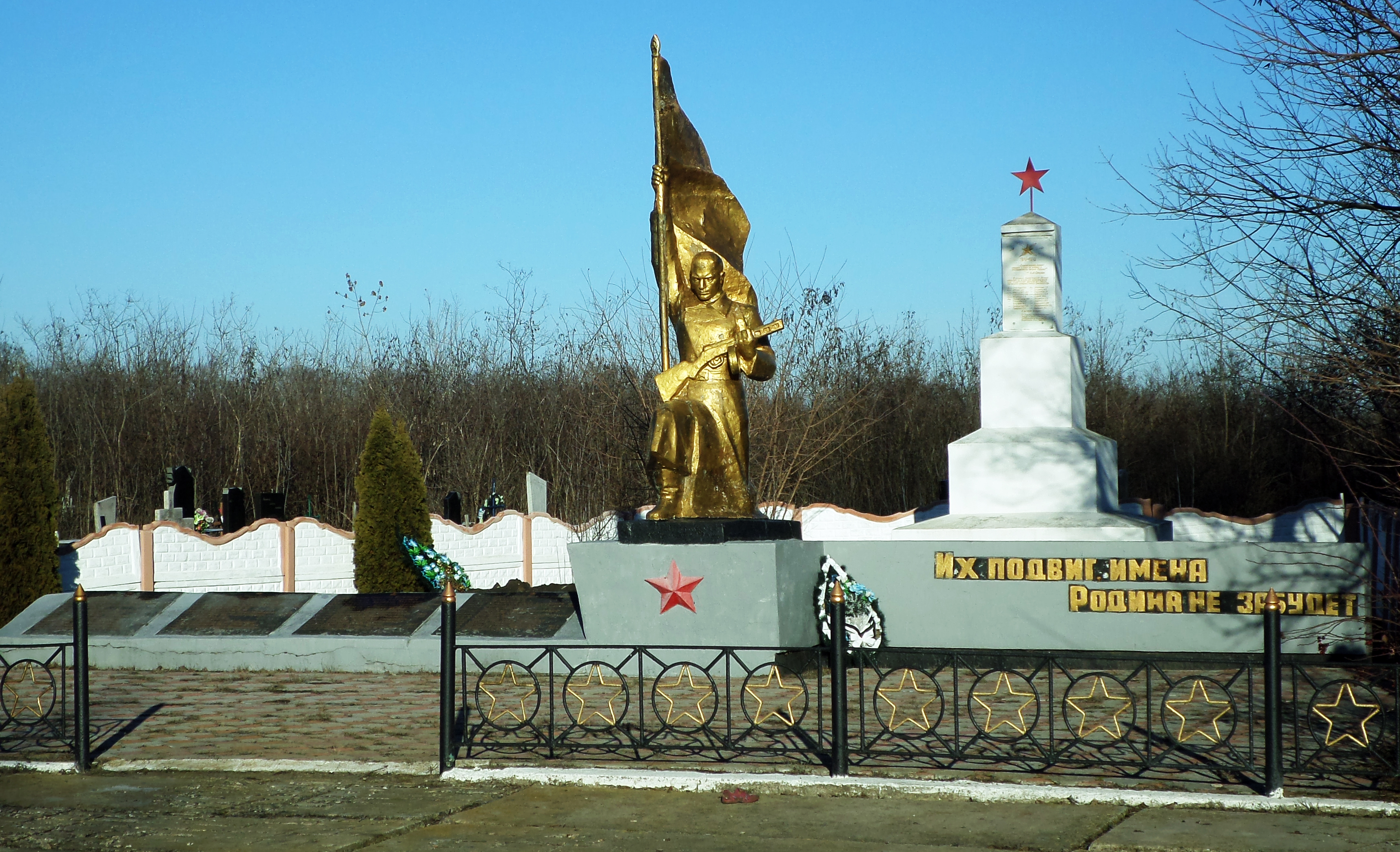
Mass grave in Zatyshshia. The inscription on the right: Their feat, names The Motherland will not forget! (behind 1947, front 1964)

A mass grave of fallen soldiers is located in Zatyshshia, which is a rarity in this area. As of 1964, when the monument was being renovated, 281 soldiers were buried there, but later many reburials from the surrounding area were made there.

=== Postwar USSR ===
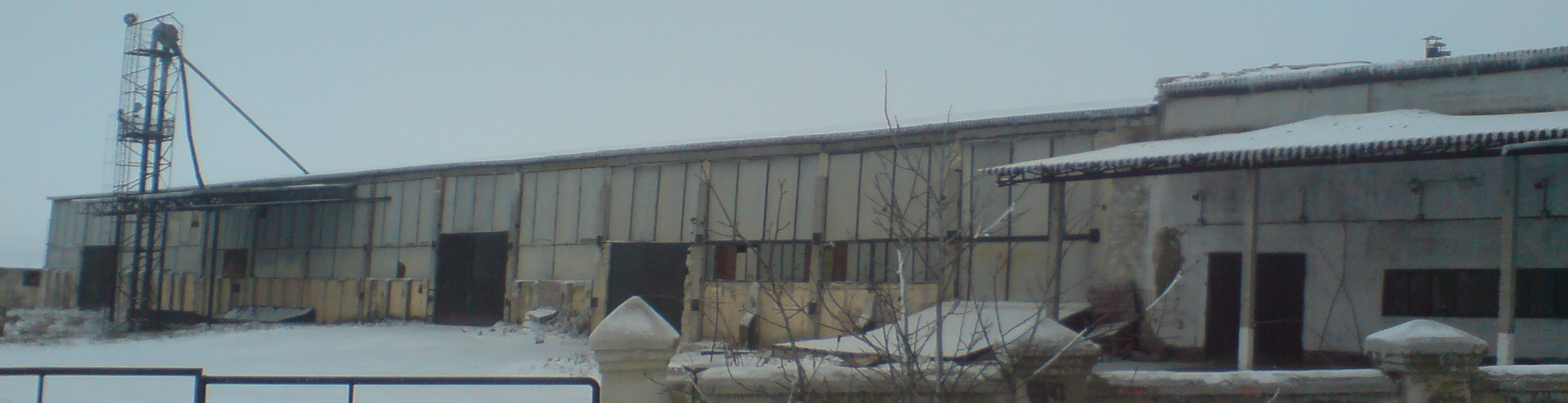
Interdistrict commodity base (1960-s)

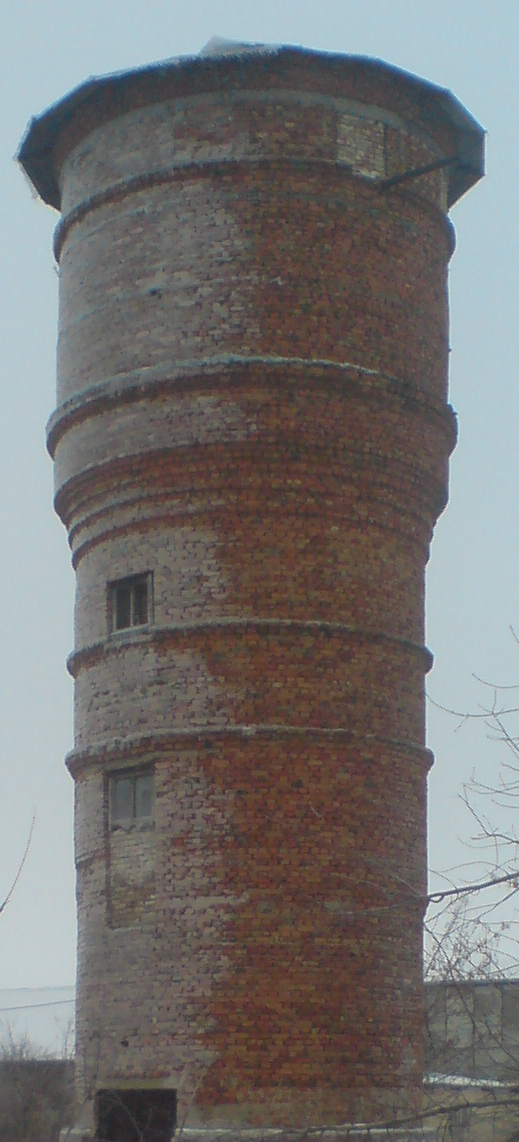
Water tower(1960-s)

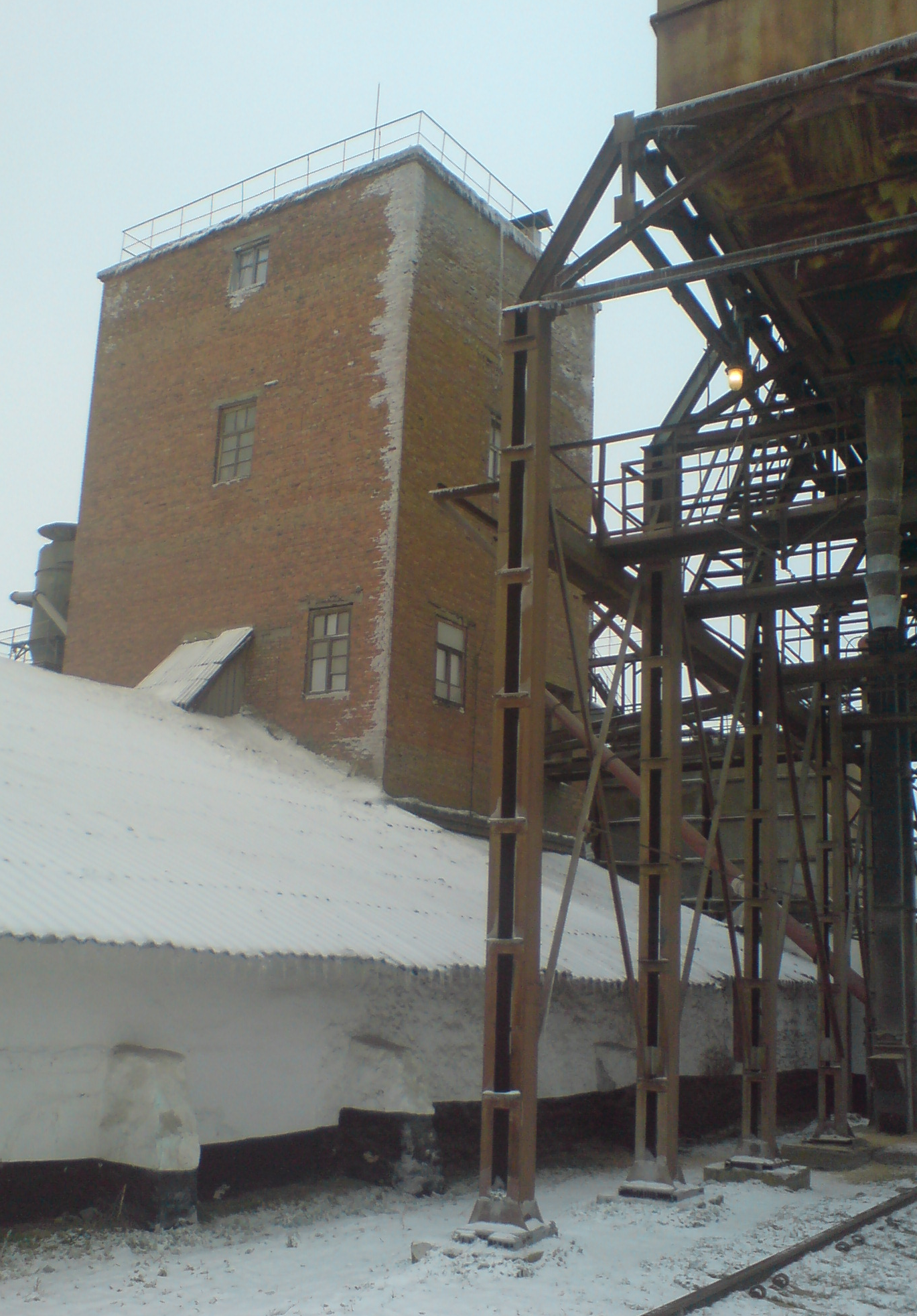
Old elevator (white - 1926, other - 1960-s)

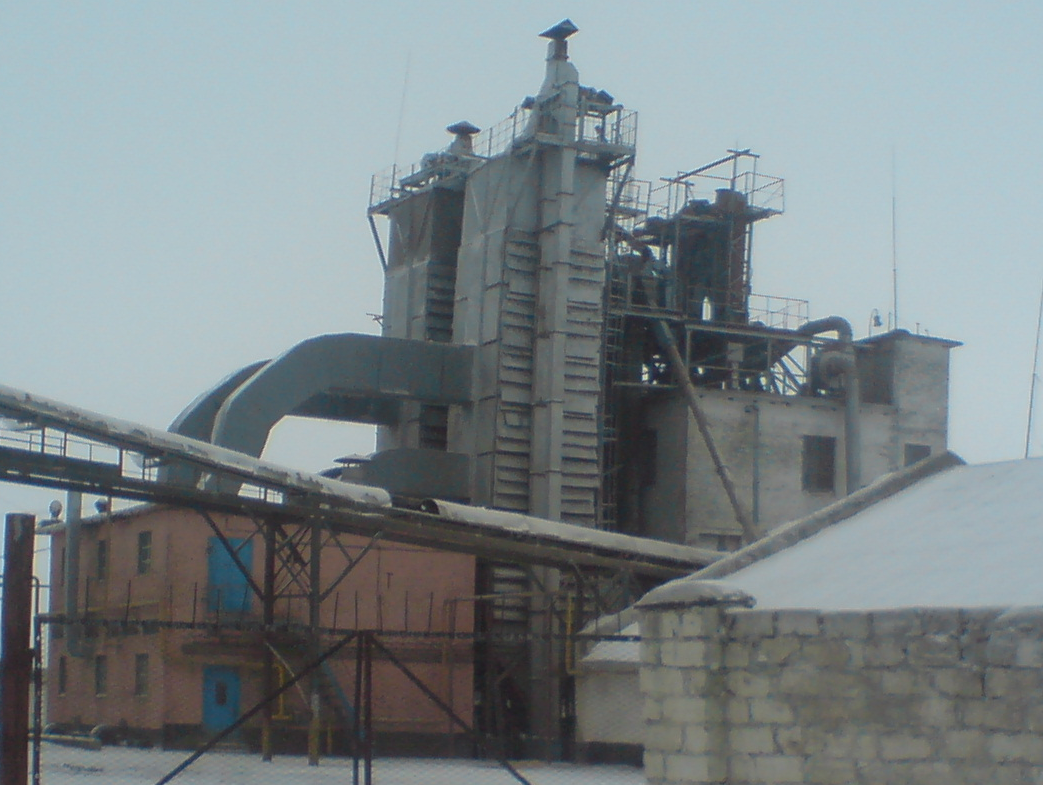
Old elevator, dryer (1960-s, gasified in 2004)

Since 1964 it has been an urban-type settlement. Not being a district center itself, Zatyshshia was located between two district centers that are not located on the railway - Zakharivka and Shyriaieve. This contributed to the emergence of a series of district and inter-district organizations and enterprises associated with a large cargo turnover. Among them there is an interdistrict commodity base, an oil depot, 2 district construction companies, various warehouses and procurement firms. On some issues, in addition to territories of Zakharivka and Shyriaieve Raions, territory of Velyka Mykhailivka Raion was also served. In particular, the inter-district commodity base served these 3 districts. A sharp decline in this infrastructure happened with the collapse of the USSR. The districts of these district centers were abolished in 2020. The border between them ran along the southeastern outskirts of Zatyshshia . Now it is the border of the enlarged Rozdilna's and Berezivka's districts.

=== Ukraine ===
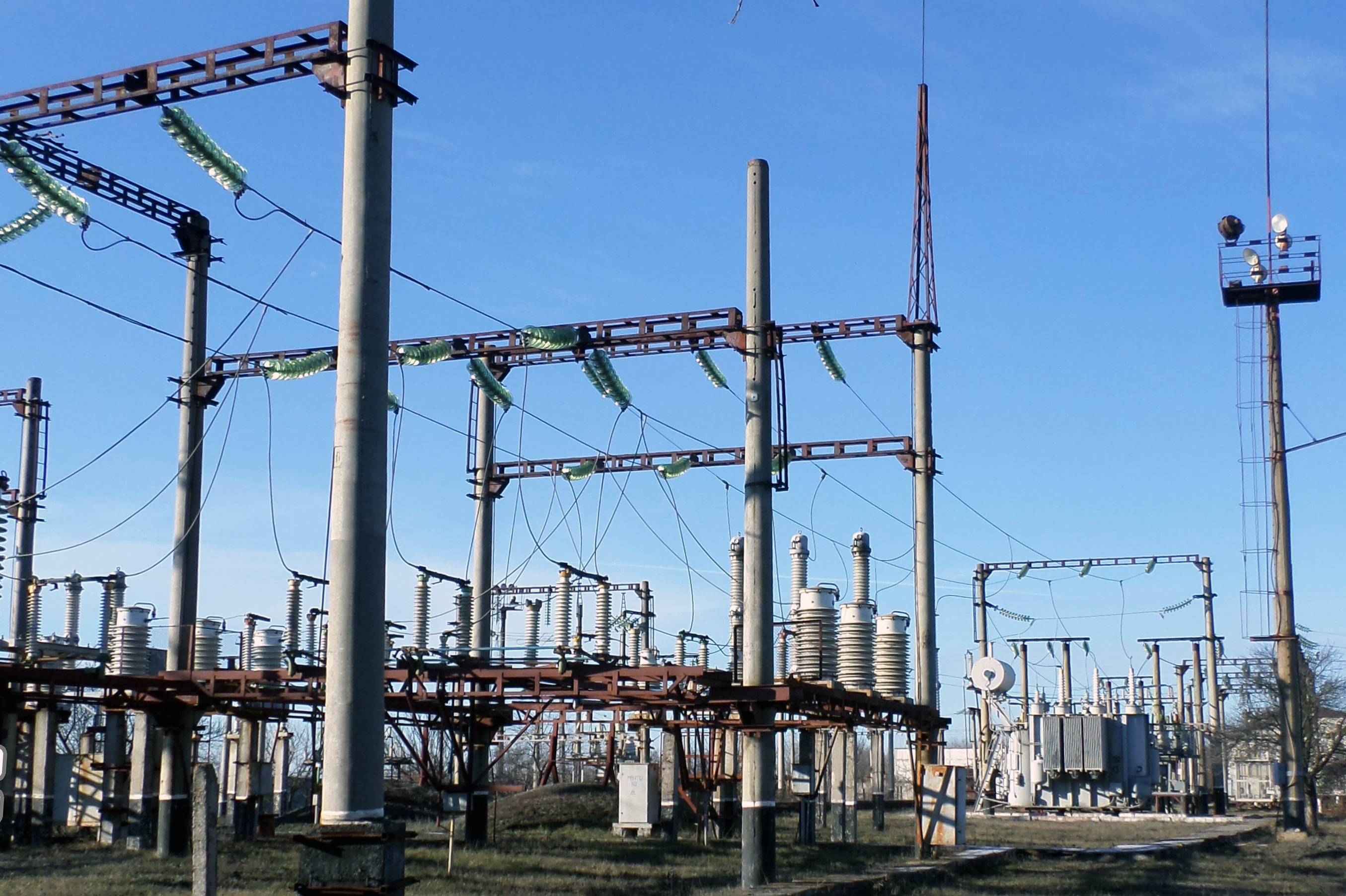
Substation 110/35/27.5 kV (1992, some 2000-2001)

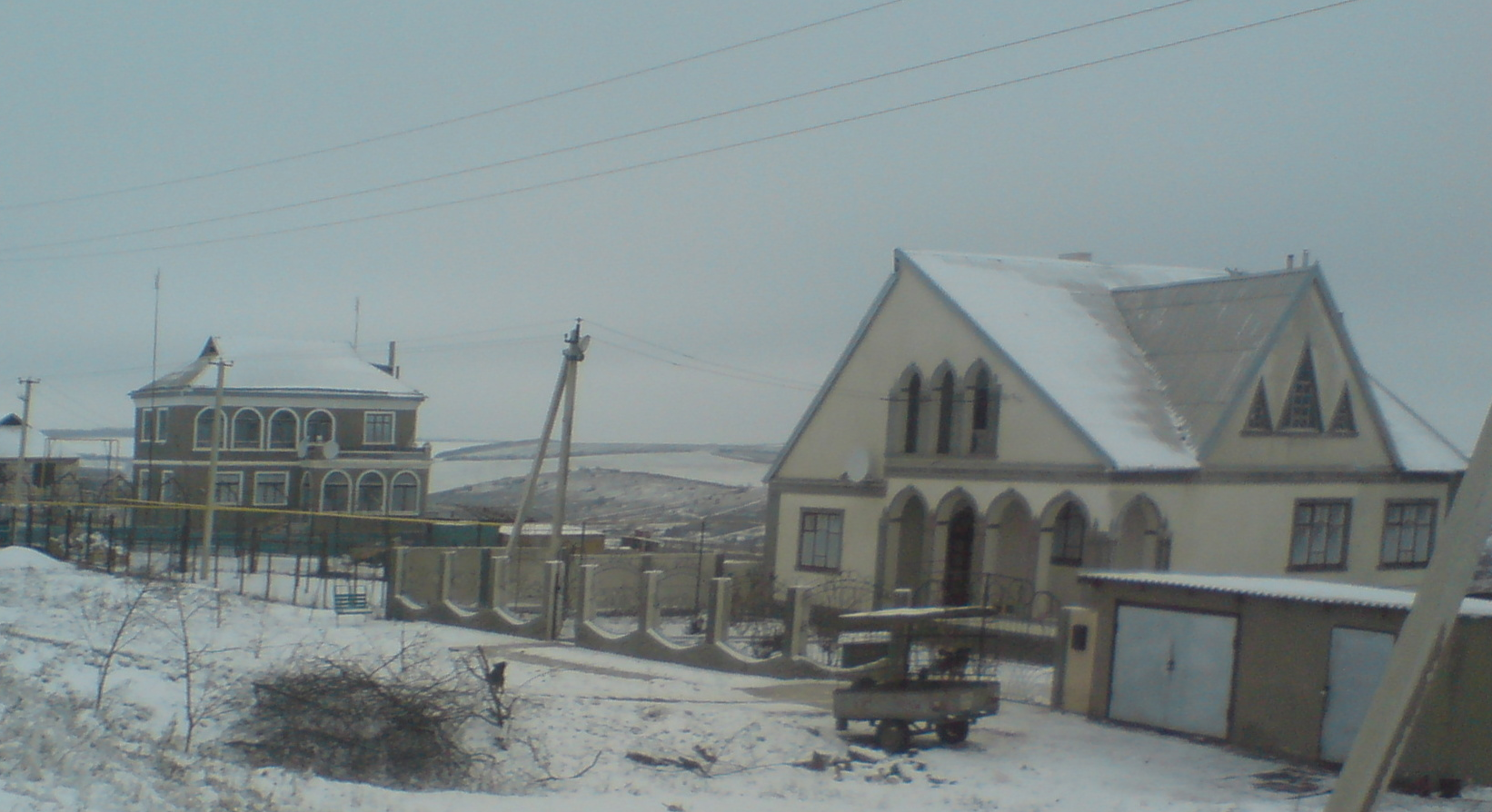
Perekops'ka street (1990s)

The railway in this section was electrified in 1992. At the same time, a powerful 110/35/27.5 kV traction power substation was built near the railway crossing to supply voltage to the railway, a locomotive depot and a new two-storey house with 24 apartments, which as of 2021 is the newest apartment building in Zatyshshia.

In the 1990s, the last wave of massive private construction took place in Zatyshsha, which significantly lengthened Nova Street and made Perekopska Street bilateral. Later, new houses were built to replace the old ones.

In 1994, the station was used to withdraw military equipment from Transnistria to Russia, after the end of the hot phase of the conflict.

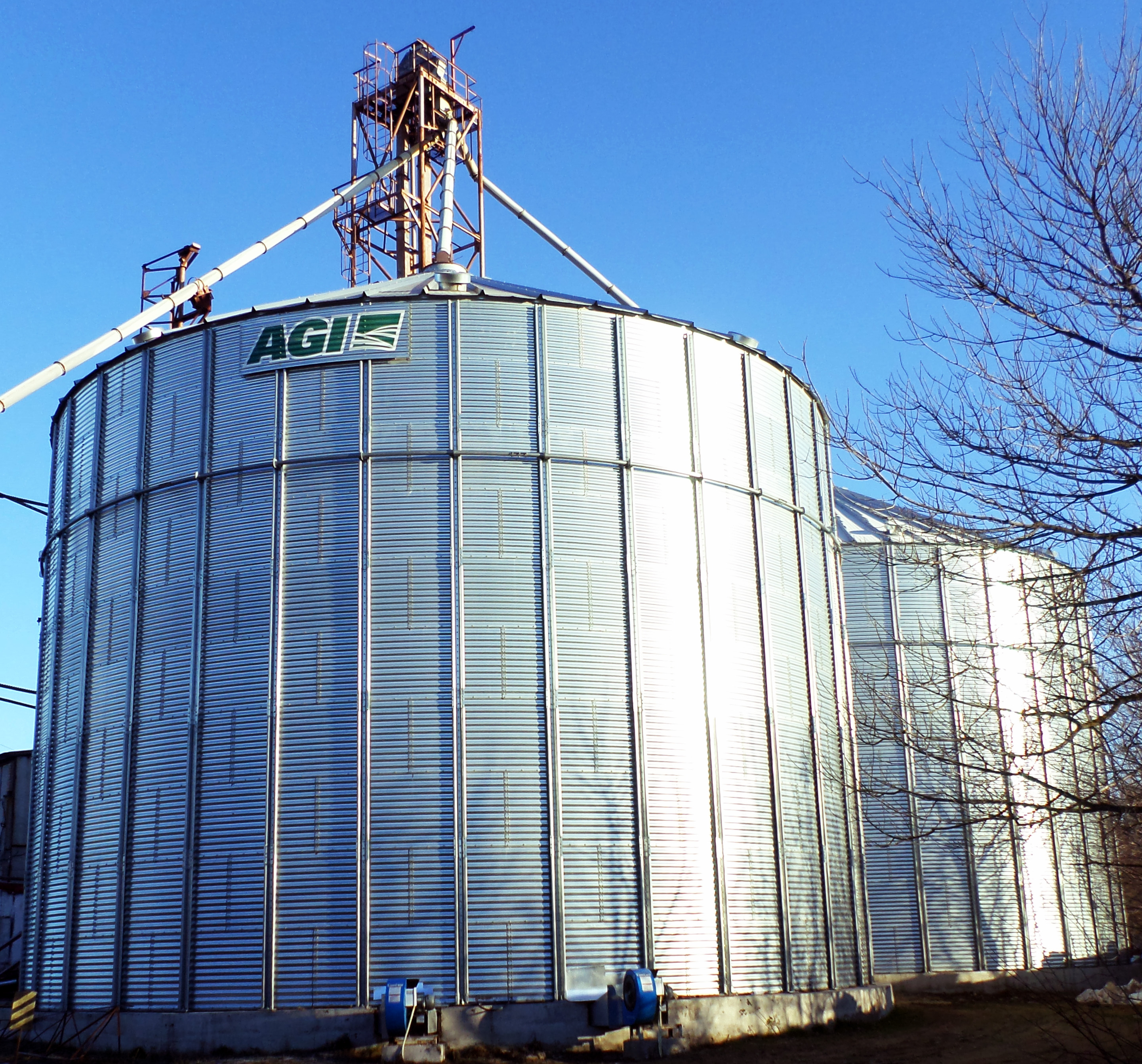
Elevator at a "Turkish mill" (2015)

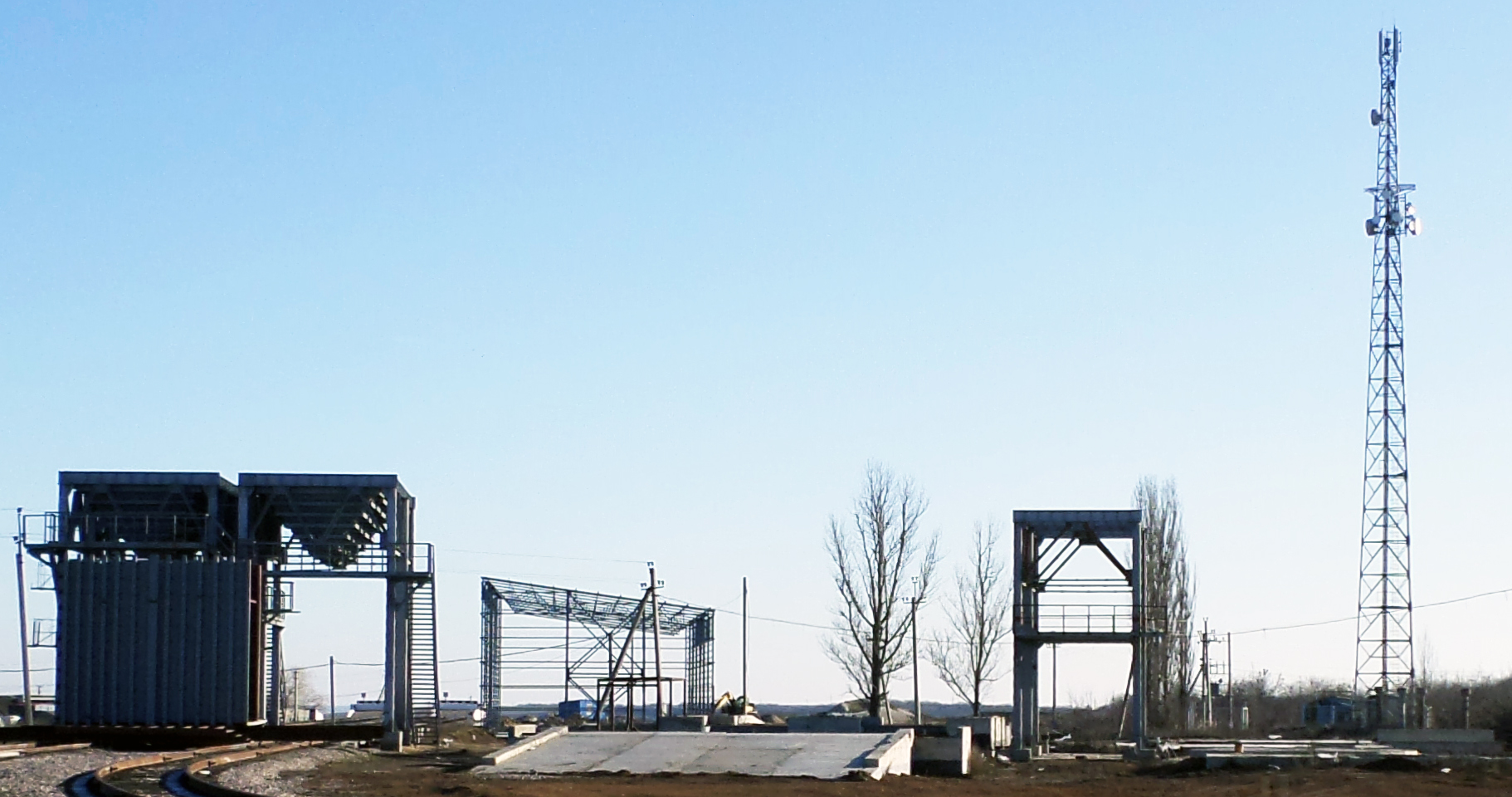
Construction of a new elevator in January 2020, Vodafone tower (2010-s)

At the end of November 2000, Zatyshshia appeared in the center of an area covered by anomalous icing with a diameter of 207 mm, which collapsed overhead power lines at a great distance and broke many trees. The power supply was fully restored only by April 2001.

During the construction of the Odesa–Brody pipeline in 1996-2001, one of its construction departments, "BU-9 Poltavanaftobud", was located in Zatyshshia.

Since 2004 Zatyshshia has been gasified.

Until 18 July 2020, Zatyshshia belonged to Zakharivka Raion. The raion was abolished in July 2020 as part of the administrative reform of Ukraine, which reduced the number of raions of Odesa Oblast to seven. The area of Zakharivka Raion was merged into Rozdilna Raion.

Until 26 January 2024, Zatyshshia was designated urban-type settlement. On this day, a new law entered into force which abolished this status, and Zatyshshia became a rural settlement.

== Hromada ==
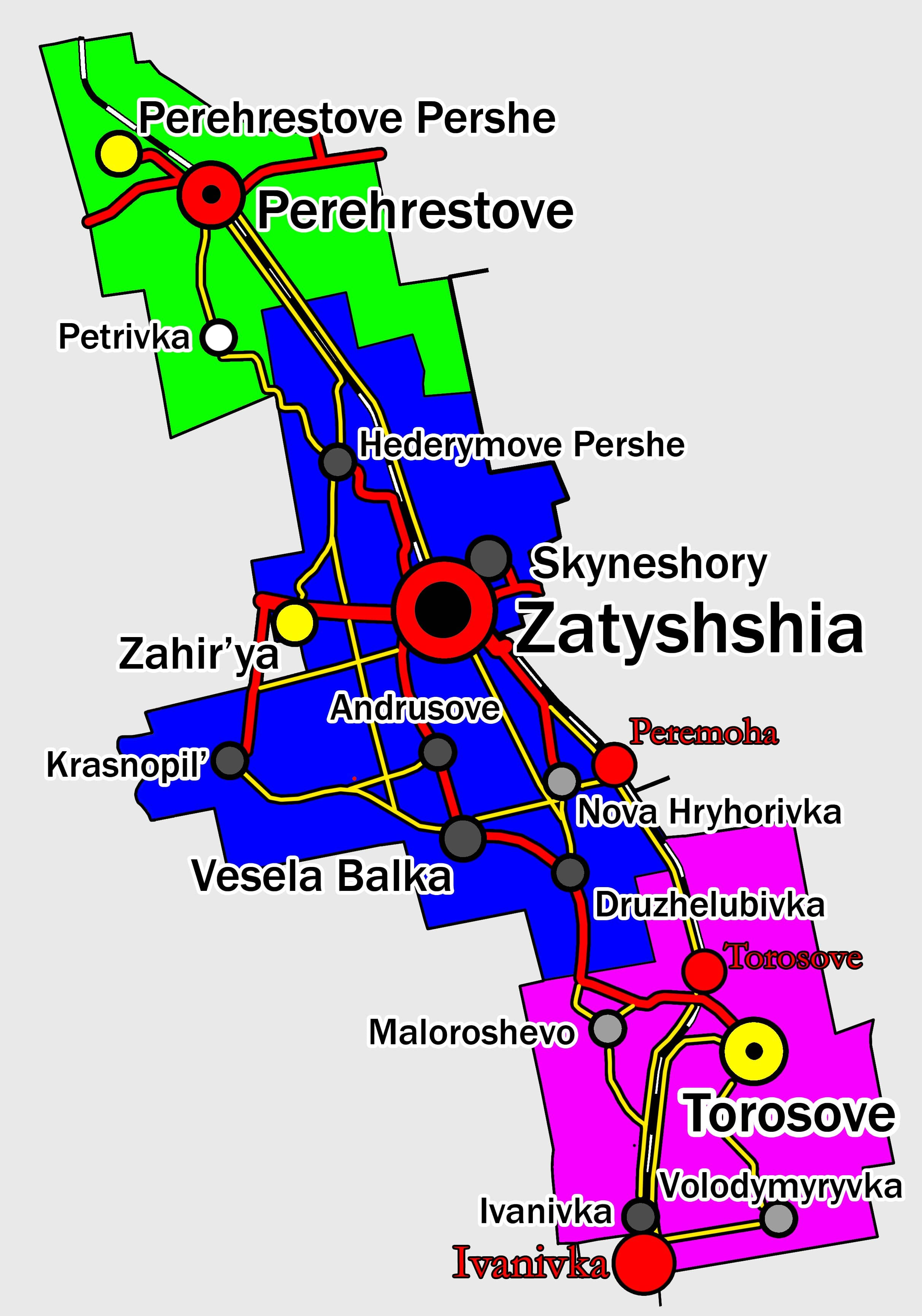
Zatyshshia settlement hromada

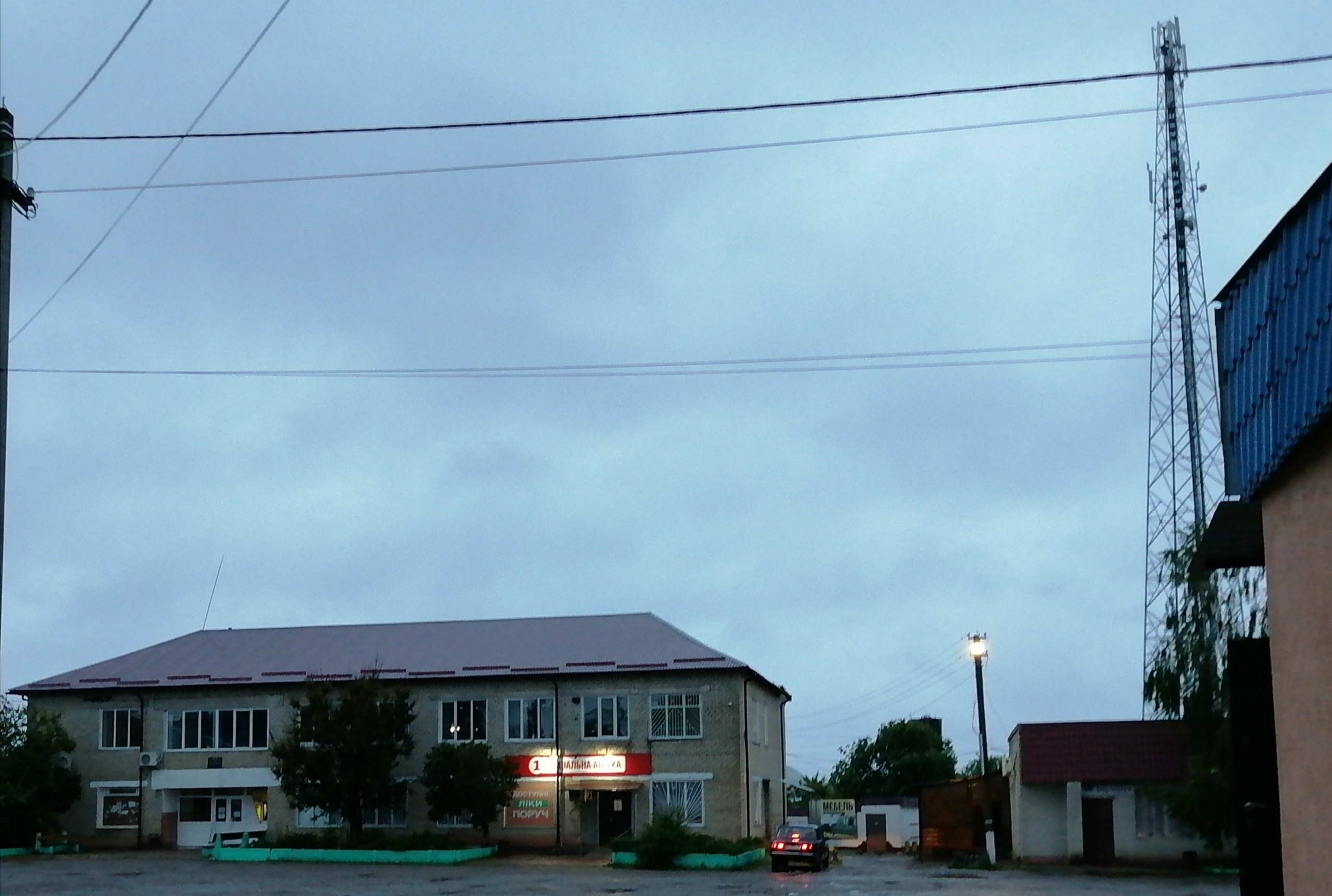
Town hall Zatyshshia (1980s), Lifecell tower (2009)

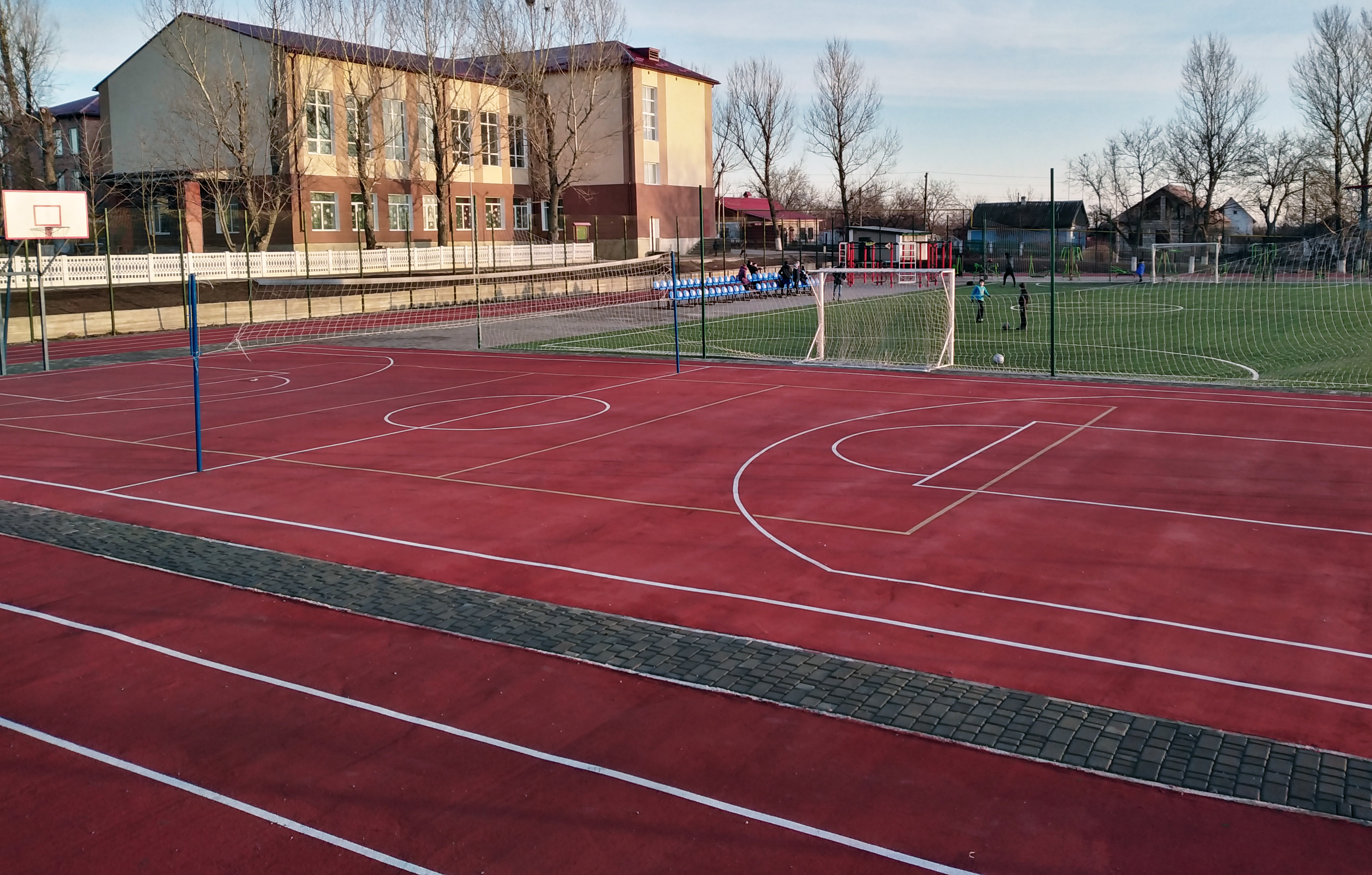
Support school stadium (2019)

Zatyshshia is the center of Zatyshshia settlement hromada, which in addition to it includes 15 more villages. The area of the community is 227.1 km 2. The population is 6578 people. It was formed on September 8, 2015. The first elections took place on December 11, 2016.

The territory of Perekhrestivska village council, where there are 3 villages (green) joined the hromada in 2020. In 2016-2020, the community area was 180.46 km 2, and the population was 5,227 in 2016 (blue and purple).

On the territory of the hromada there are 36 kilometers of the railway Odesa-Kyiv, 2 stations and 2 stopping platforms. The T-1614 highway passes through Zatyshshia.
