= Rozdilna Raion =

Subdivision of Odesa Oblast, Ukraine

Rozdilna Raion Роздільнянський район
- Raion
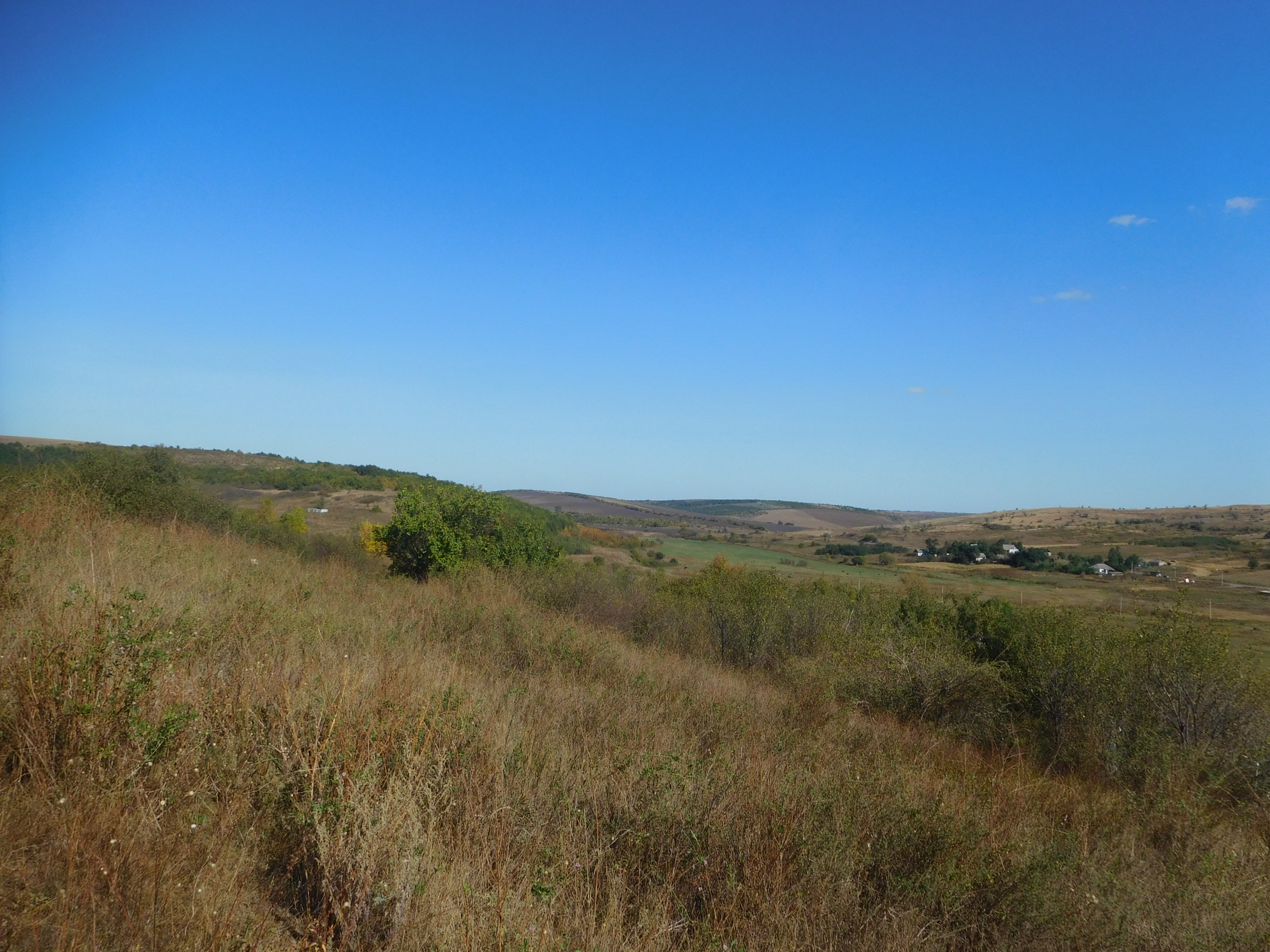

- Flag Coat of arms

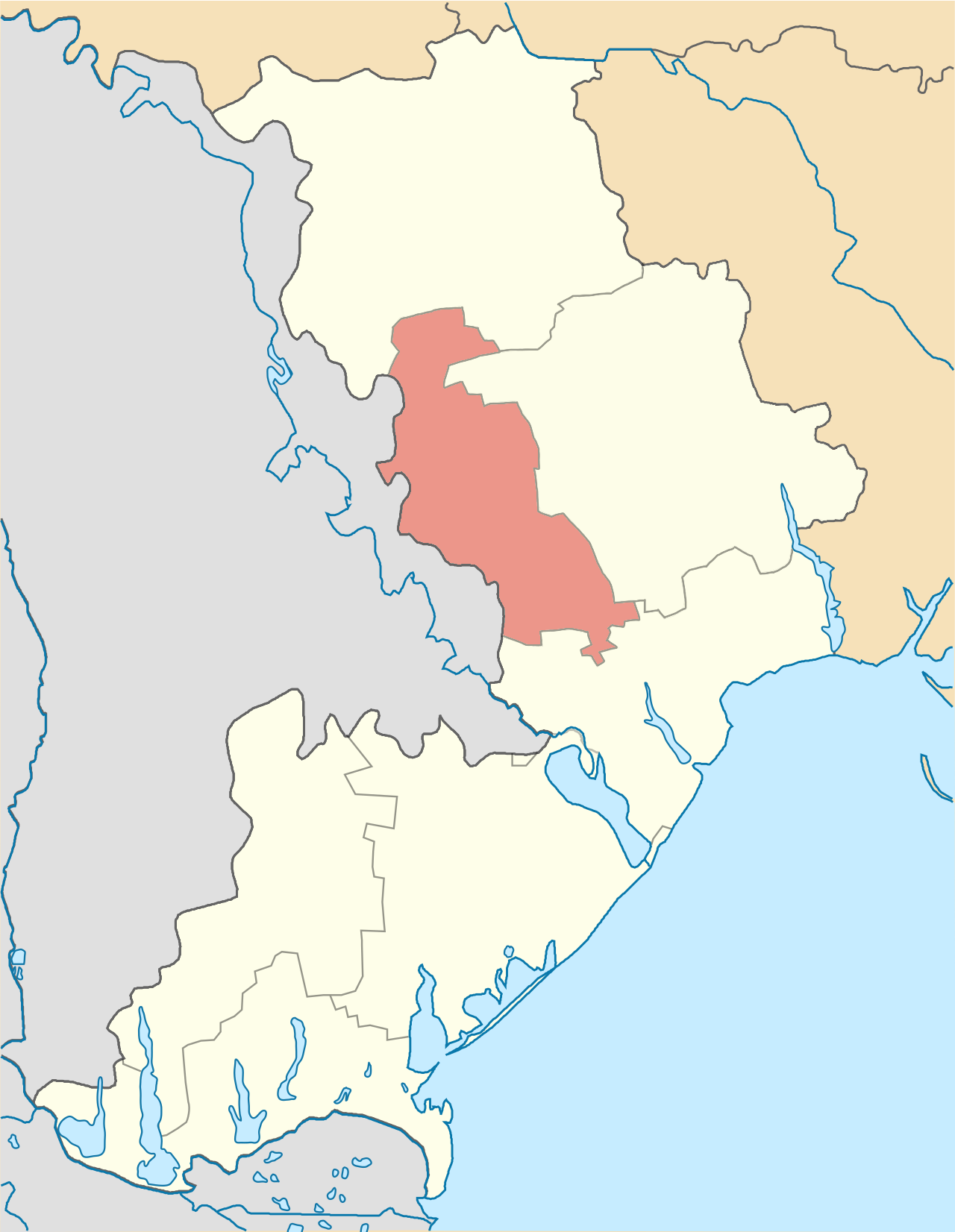
- Coordinates: 46°48′24″N 30°10′34″E
- Country: Ukraine
- Oblast: Odesa Oblast
- Established: 15 September 1930
- Admin. center: Rozdilna
- Subdivisions: 9 hromadas

Area: since July 2020
  - Total: 3,566.3 km^{2} (1,377.0 sq mi)

Population (2022)
  - Total: 101,407
  - Density: 28.435/km^{2} (73.646/sq mi)
- Time zone: UTC+02:00 (EET)
  - Summer (DST): UTC+03:00 (EEST)
- Postal index: 67400
- Area code: 380-4853
- Website: rozdilna-rda.od.gov.ua

Rozdilna Raion (Ukrainian: Роздільнянський район) is a raion (district) in Odesa Oblast of Ukraine. Its administrative center is the city of Rozdilna. Population: 101,407 (2022 estimate).

On 17 July 2020, as part of the administrative reform of Ukraine, the number of raions of Odesa Oblast was reduced to seven, and the area of Rozdilna Raion was significantly expanded. Two abolished raions, Velyka Mykhailivka and Zakharivka Raions, were merged into Rozdilna Raion. The January 2020 estimate of the raion population was 57,209 (2020 est.).

According to the 2001 Ukrainian census the population was 78% Ukrainian, 14% Russian, 5% Moldovan (Romanian), 1% Bulgarian, and 1% Belarusian.

The urban-type settlement of Lymanske and the village of Kuchurhan are located at the western edge of the district along the border with Transnistria in Moldova.

== Administrative division ==
=== Current ===
After the reform in July 2020, the raion consisted of 9 hromadas:

- Lymanske settlement hromada with the administration in the rural settlement of Lymanske, retained from Rozdilna Raion;
- Novoborysivka rural hromada with the administration in the village of Novoborysivka, transferred from Velyka Mykhailivka Raion;
- Rozdilna urban hromada with the administration in the city of Rozdilna, retained from Rozdilna Raion;
- Stepanivka rural hromada with the administration in the village of Stepanivka, retained from Rozdilna Raion;
- Tsebrykove settlement hromada with the administration in therural settlement of Tsebrykove, transferred from Velyka Mykhailivka Raion;
- Velyka Mykhailivka settlement hromada with the administration in the rural settlement of Velyka Mykhailivka, transferred from Velyka Mykhailivka Raion;
- Velykoploske rural hromada with the administration in the village of Velykoploske, transferred from Velyka Mykhailivka Raion;
- Zakharivka settlement hromada with the administration in the rural settlement of Zakharivka;
- Zatyshshia settlement hromada with the administration in the rural settlement of Zatyshshia.

=== Before 2020 ===
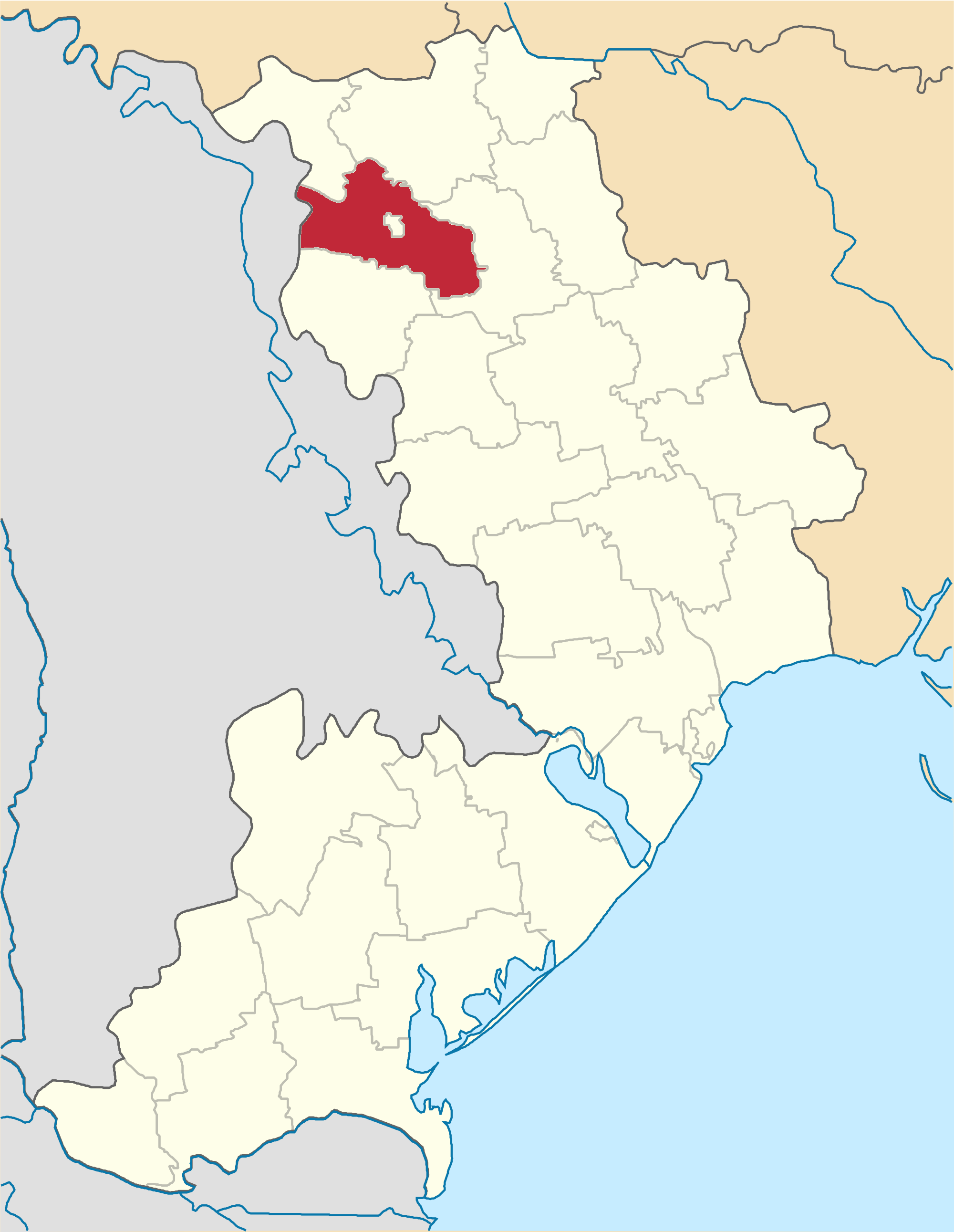
Podilsk Raion in Odesa Oblast (1966-2020)

Before the 2020 reform, the raion consisted of one hromada,

- Lymanske settlement hromada with the administration in Lymanske;
- Rozdilna urban hromada with the administration in Rozdilna.
- Stepanivka rural hromada with the administration in Stepanivka,
