= List of villages in Odesa Oblast =

Odesa Oblast in Ukraine

This is a list of villages in Odesa Oblast of Ukraine, categorised by raion.

== Berezivka Raion ==
- Odradna Balka
- Petrovirivka
- Tanivka
- Velykyi Buialyk
- Vovkove

== Bilhorod-Dnistrovskyi Raion ==
- Bilenke
- Kosivka
- Lebedivka
- Prymorske, Lyman rural hromada
- Prymorske, Serhiiva settlement hromada
- Shabo

== Bolhrad Raion ==
- Dmytrivka
- Karakurt
- Krasne
- Luzhanka
- Vasylivka
- Vesela Dolyna

== Izmail Raion ==
- Bile
- Desantne
- Dmytrivka
- Dolynske
- Furmanivka
- Komyshivka
- Kotlovyna
- Lisky
- Lymanske
- Myrne
- Nahirne
- Nova Nekrasivka
- Novosilske
- Orlivka
- Plavni
- Prymorske
- Pryozerne
- Shevchenkove
- Vasylivka

== Odesa Raion ==
- Avhustivka
- Berehove
- Cherevychne
- Chobotarivka
- Dachne
- Illinka
- Kovalivka
- Kryzhanivka
- Lymanka
- Marynivka
- Mizhlymanske
- Naberezhne
- Nadlymanske
- Nova Emetivka
- Nova Kovalivka
- Protopopivka
- Shyroka Balka
- Stara Emetivka
- Tykhne
- Usatove
- Vapniarka
- Vaskylivka
- Velykyi Dalnyk

== Podilsk Raion ==
- Bilyne
- Hrabove
- Lypetske
- Moshniahy
- Novoselivka
- Olenivka
- Platonove
- Shkarbynka
- Zelenyi Hai

== Rozdilna Raion ==
- Andrusova
- Bolharka
- Kurchurhan
- Svitanok
- Velykokomarivka
- Vesela Balka
- Yosypivka
