= Nova Kovalivka =

Rural locality in Odesa Oblast, Ukraine

Nova Kovalivka Нова Ковалівка
- Rural settlement
- Nova Kovalivka
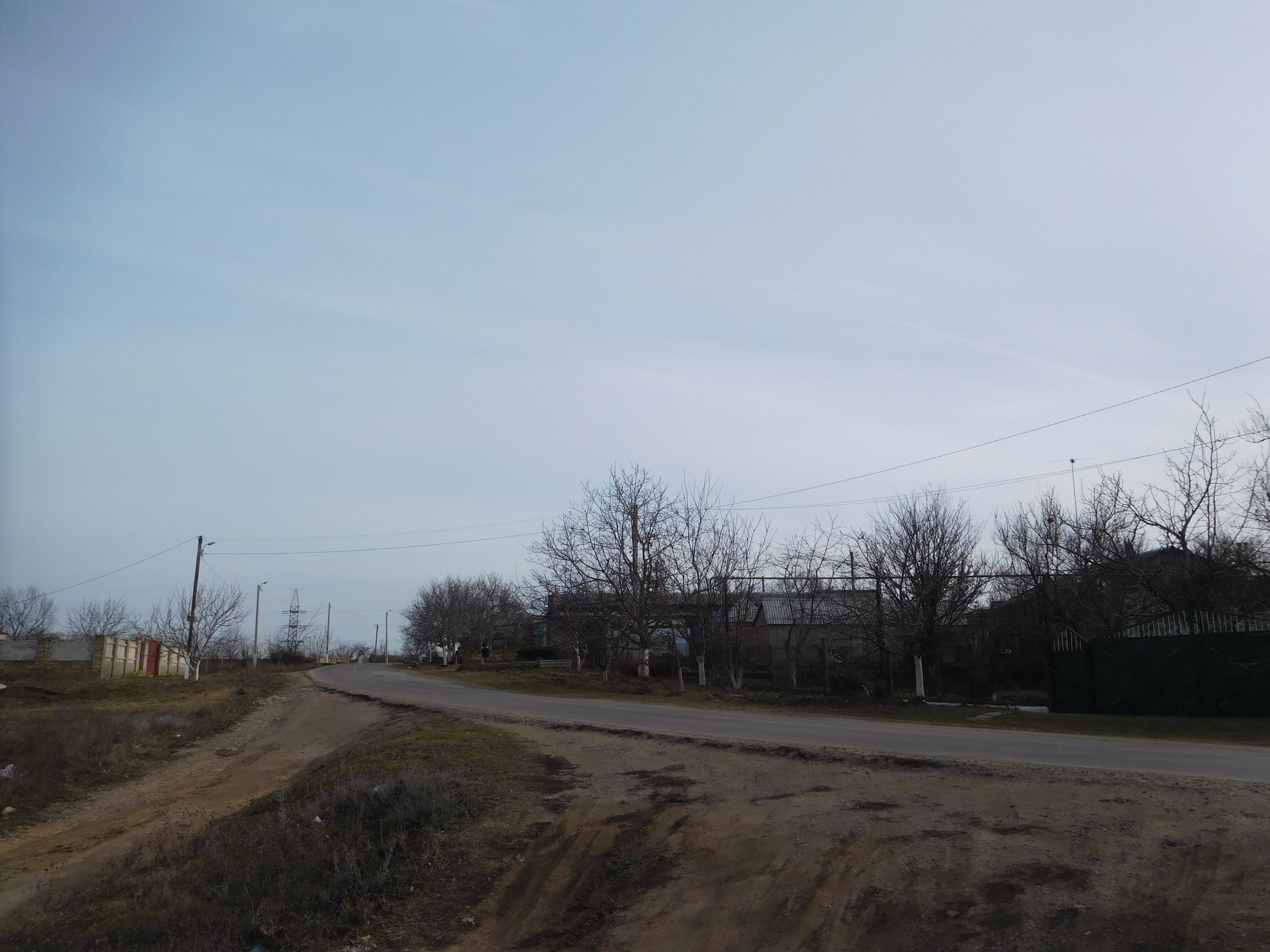
- One of the roads in Nova Kovalivka
- Etymology: Nova means New. Koval (in Kovalivka ) means Blacksmith (or Smith). So, Nova Kovalivka means New Blacksmiths
- Interactive map of Nova Kovalivka
- Location within Odesa Oblast Location within Ukraine
- Coordinates: 46°41′57″N 30°36′23″E
- Country: Ukraine
- Oblast: Odesa Oblast
- Raion: Odesa Raion
- Hromada: Usatove rural hromada
- Founded: 1950-1960's

Area
  - Land: 033 km^{2} (13 sq mi)
- Elevation: 58 m (190 ft)

Population
  - Total: 209
  - Density: 6.3/km^{2} (16/sq mi)
- Time zone: UTC+2 (EET (Kyiv))
  - Summer (DST): UTC+3 (EEST)
- Postal Code: 67631
- Area code: 380 4852

Nova Kovalivka (Ukrainian: Нова Ковалівка) is a village located in Odesa Raion, Odesa Oblast, Ukraine. It belongs to Usatove rural hromada, one of the hromadas of Ukraine, and is one of 15 villages in the hromada. It has a population of 209.

Until 18 July 2020, Nova Kovalivka belonged to Biliaivka Raion. The raion was abolished in July 2020 as part of the administrative reform of Ukraine, which reduced the number of raions of Odesa Oblast to seven. The area of Biliaivka Raion was merged into Odesa Raion.

== Population census ==
As of January 12, 1989, Nova Kovalivka had a population of about 363; 172 men and 191 women.

As of December 5, 2001, Nova Kovalivka had a population of 286.

1989 and 2001 population census comparison
	Population as of 1989	Population as of 2001
Men	172	127 (Estimated)
Women	191	159 (Estimated)

=== Language distribution ===
Nova Kovalivka had a few native tongue languages.

Language Distribution of Nova Kovalivka
Language	Distribution
Ukrainian	81.47
Russian	15.73
Bulgarian	0.70
German	0.70
Gagauz	0.35
Moldovan	0.35
Others/Uncertain	0.70

== See also ==
- Usatove
- Kovalivka
