= Stara Emetivka =

Rural locality in Odesa Oblast, Ukraine

Stara Emetivka Стара Еметівка Staraya Emetovka and Стара Еметівка
- Village
- Stara Emetivka
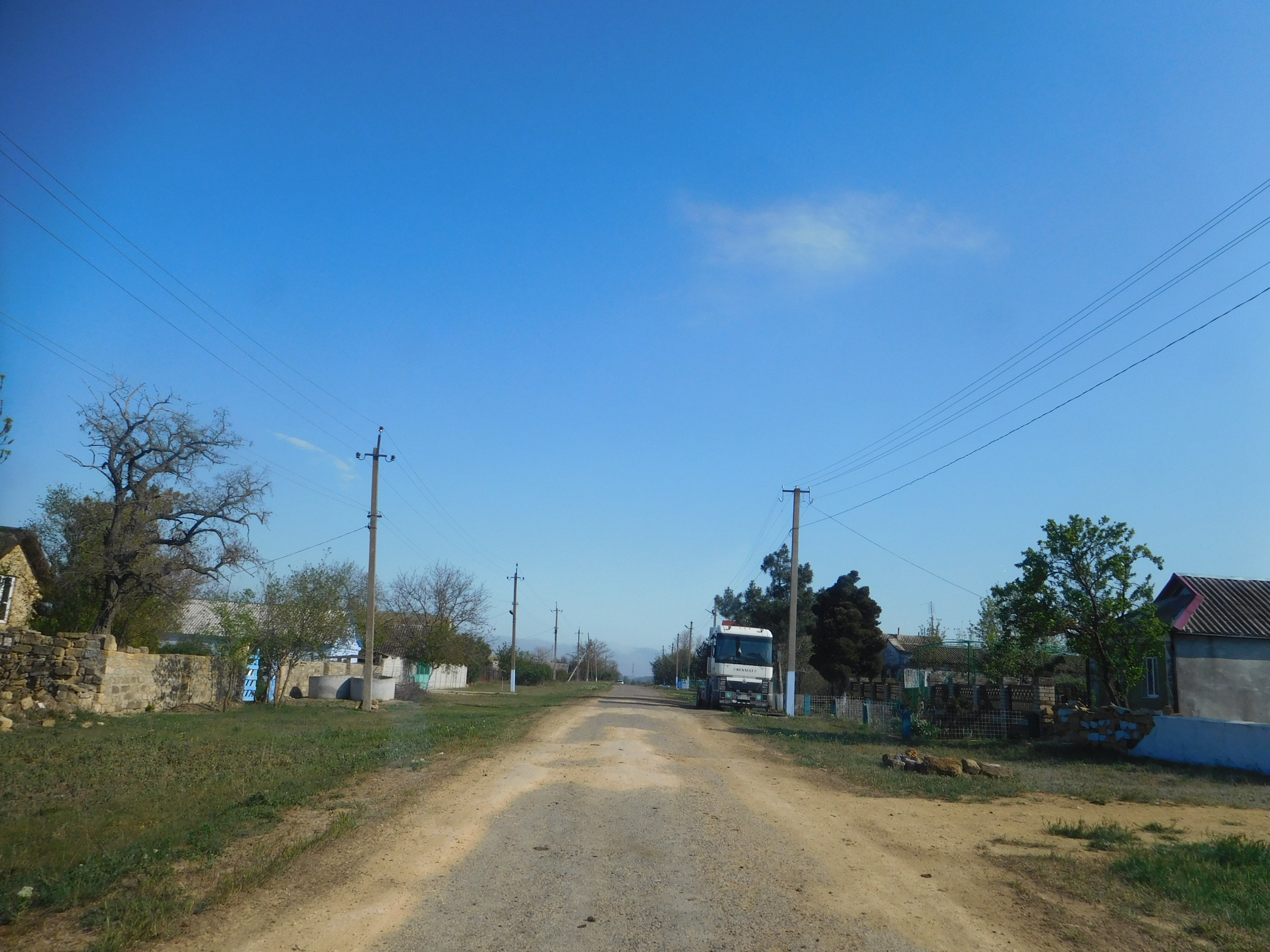
- Central street of the village
- Etymology: Stara (Стара) means old in Ukrainian. Stara Emetivka means Old Emetivka
- Interactive map of Stara Emetivka
- Location within Odesa Oblast Location within Ukraine
- Coordinates: 46°43′53″N 30°35′49″E
- Country: Ukraine
- Oblast: Odesa Oblast
- Raion: Odesa Raion
- Hromada: Usatove rural hromada
- Founded: 1850-1860's

Area
  - Land: 0.58 km^{2} (0.22 sq mi)
- Elevation: 8 m (26 ft)

Population
  - Total: 21
  - Density: 36/km^{2} (94/sq mi)
- Time zone: UTC+2 (EET (Kyiv))
  - Summer (DST): UTC+3 (EEST)
- Postal Code: 67631
- Area code: +380 4852

Stara Emetivka (Staraya Emetovka) is a village in Odesa Raion, Odesa Oblast, Ukraine. It belongs to Usatove rural hromada, one of the hromadas of Ukraine, and is one of 15 villages in the hromada. It has a population of 21.

Until 18 July 2020, Stara Emetivka belonged to Biliaivka Raion. The raion was abolished in July 2020 as part of the administrative reform of Ukraine, which reduced the number of raions of Odesa Oblast to seven. The area of Biliaivka Raion was merged into Odesa Raion.

== Etymology ==
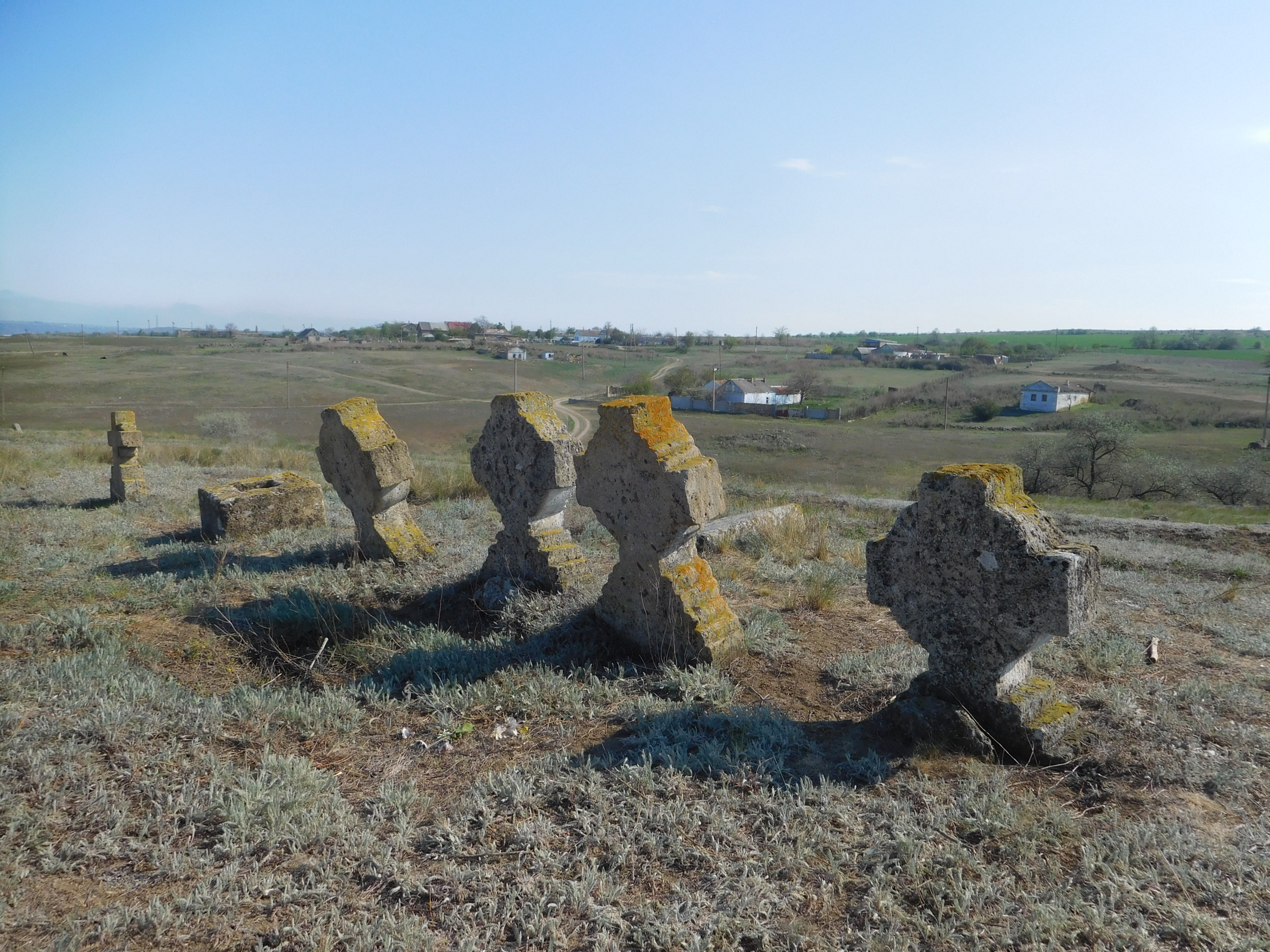
Abandoned cemetery in the village

There are two Emetivka's, Nova and Stara Emetivka. Stara (Стара) means old in Ukrainian. Stara Emetivka means old Emetivka.

== Population census ==
As of January 12, 1989, Stara Emetivka had a population of 63. 30 men and 33 women.

As of December 5, 2001, Stara Emetivka had a population of 47.

1989 2001 population census comparison
	Population as of 1989	Population as of 2001
Men	30	10 (Estimated)
Women	33	11 (Estimated)

=== Language distribution ===
It shows three languages in the Stara Emetivka language distribution.

Language Distribution
Language	Percent
Ukraine	85%
Russian	10%
Moldovan	5%

== See also ==
Nova Emetivka
