= Marynivka =

Marynivka may refer to the following villages in Ukraine:

- Marynivka, Donetsk Oblast
- Marynivka, Odesa Oblast
- Marynivka, Mykolaiv Oblast

== See also ==
- Malynivka
