= Cherevychne =

Rural locality in Odesa Oblast, Ukraine

Cherevychne Черевичне Cherevichny, Cherevichnoye, Cherevichnyy, Cherevichne
- Village
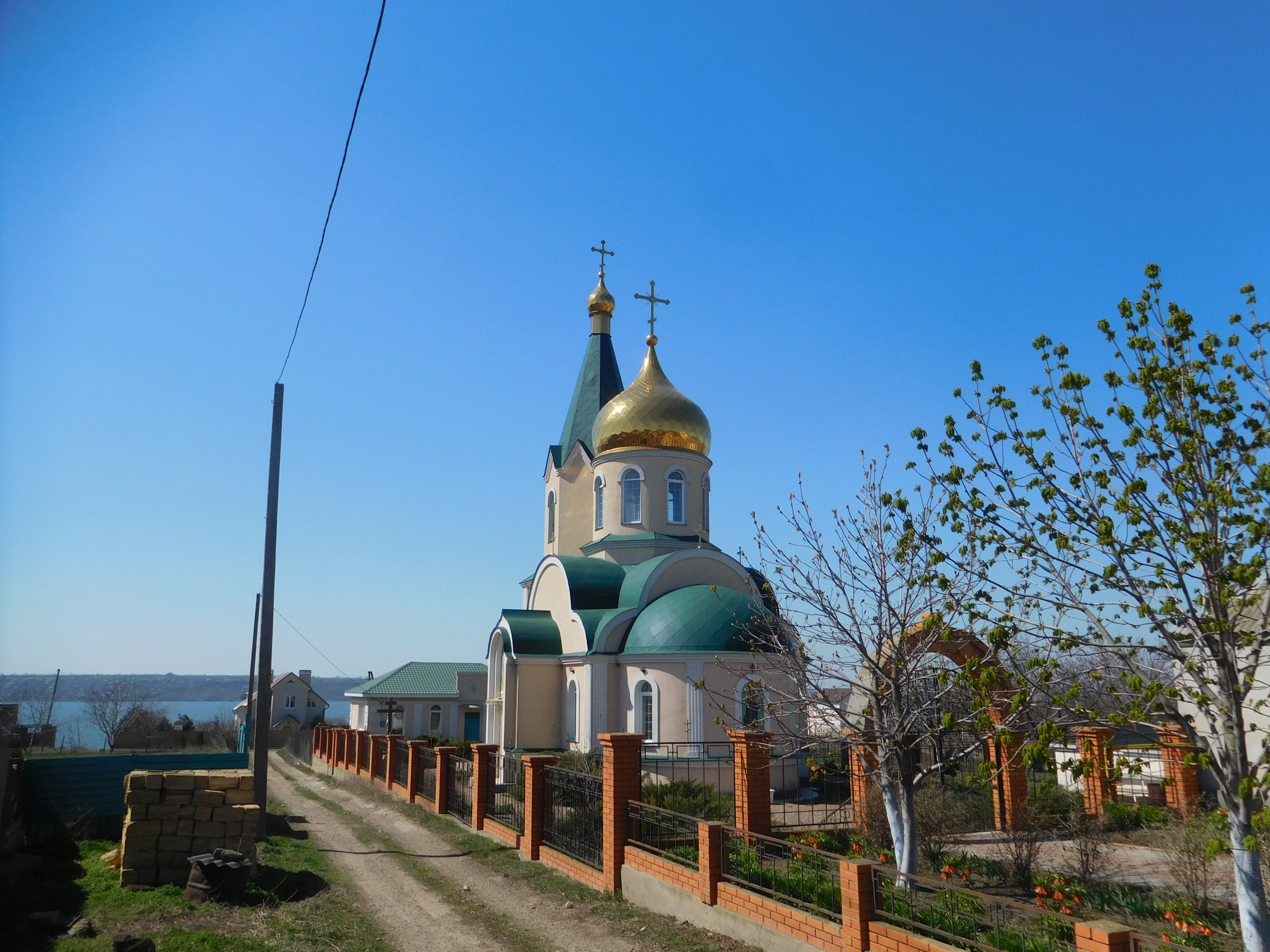
- Interactive map of Cherevychne
- Location within Odesa Oblast Location within Ukraine
- Coordinates: 46°38′24″N 30°37′16″E
- Country: Ukraine
- Oblast: Odesa Oblast
- Raion: Odesa Raion
- Hromada: Usatove rural hromada
- Date Established: 1904

Area
  - Total: 0.5 km^{2} (0.19 sq mi)

Population
  - Total: 135
  - Density: 270/km^{2} (700/sq mi)
- Time zone: UTC+2 (EET (Kyiv))
  - Summer (DST): UTC+3 (EEST)
- Postal Code: 67632

Cherevychne (Ukrainian: Черевичне) is a municipality in Ukraine in Odesa Raion, Odesa Oblast. It belongs to Usatove rural hromada, one of the hromadas of Ukraine. The population is 135.

Until 18 July 2020, Cherevychne belonged to Biliaivka Raion. The raion was abolished in July 2020 as part of the administrative reform of Ukraine, which reduced the number of raions of Odesa Oblast to seven. The area of Biliaivka Raion was merged into Odesa Raion.

== See also ==
- Chobotarivka
