= Protopopivka, Odesa Oblast =

Rural locality in Odesa Oblast, Ukraine

Protopopivka Протопопівка
- Village
- Protopopivka (Odesa Oblast)
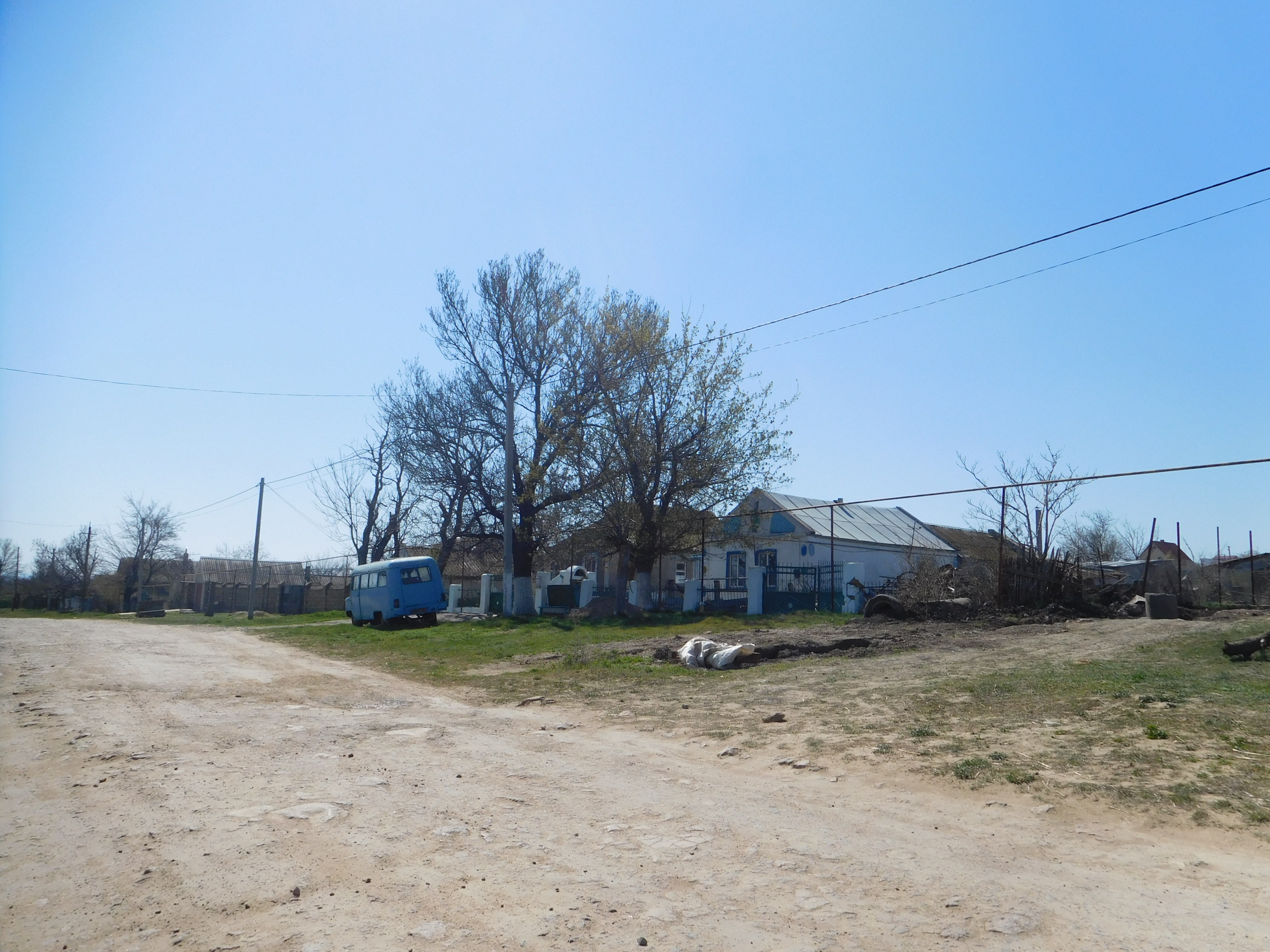
- Interactive map of Protopopivka
- Location within Odesa Oblast Location within Ukraine
- Coordinates: 46°36′15″N 30°39′42″E
- Country: Ukraine
- Oblast: Odesa Oblast
- Raion: Odesa Raion
- Hromada: Usatove rural hromada
- Founded: 1800–1850s

Area
  - Land: 2.95 km^{2} (1.14 sq mi)
- Elevation: 9 m (30 ft)

Population
  - Total: 408
  - Density: 138/km^{2} (358/sq mi)
- Time zone: UTC+2 (EET (Kyiv))
  - Summer (DST): UTC+3 (EEST)
- Postal Code: 67632
- Area code: +380 4852

Protopopivka is a village in Ukraine, in Odesa Raion of Odesa Oblast. The village has a population of 408 people. It belongs to Usatove rural hromada, one of the hromadas of Ukraine. Protopopivka is one of 15 villages in the Usatove (hromada). It is one of the villages established during the Constituency 139.

Until 18 July 2020, Protopopivka belonged to Biliaivka Raion. The raion was abolished in July 2020 as part of the administrative reform of Ukraine, which reduced the number of raions of Odesa Oblast to seven. The area of Biliaivka Raion was merged into Odesa Raion.

== Population census ==
As of 18 January 1989, Protopopivka had a population of 440 with 214 men, and 226 women. As of 5 December 2001, Protopopivka has a total population of 425.

=== Language distribution ===
It shows the language distribution. It only have 2 languages, Ukrainian and Russian.

Language Distribution
Language	Percent
Ukrainian	90%
Russian	10%
