= Naberezhne, Odesa Oblast =

Rural settlement in Odesa Oblast, Ukraine

Naberezhne Набережне
- Rural settlement
- Naberezhne (Odesa Oblast)
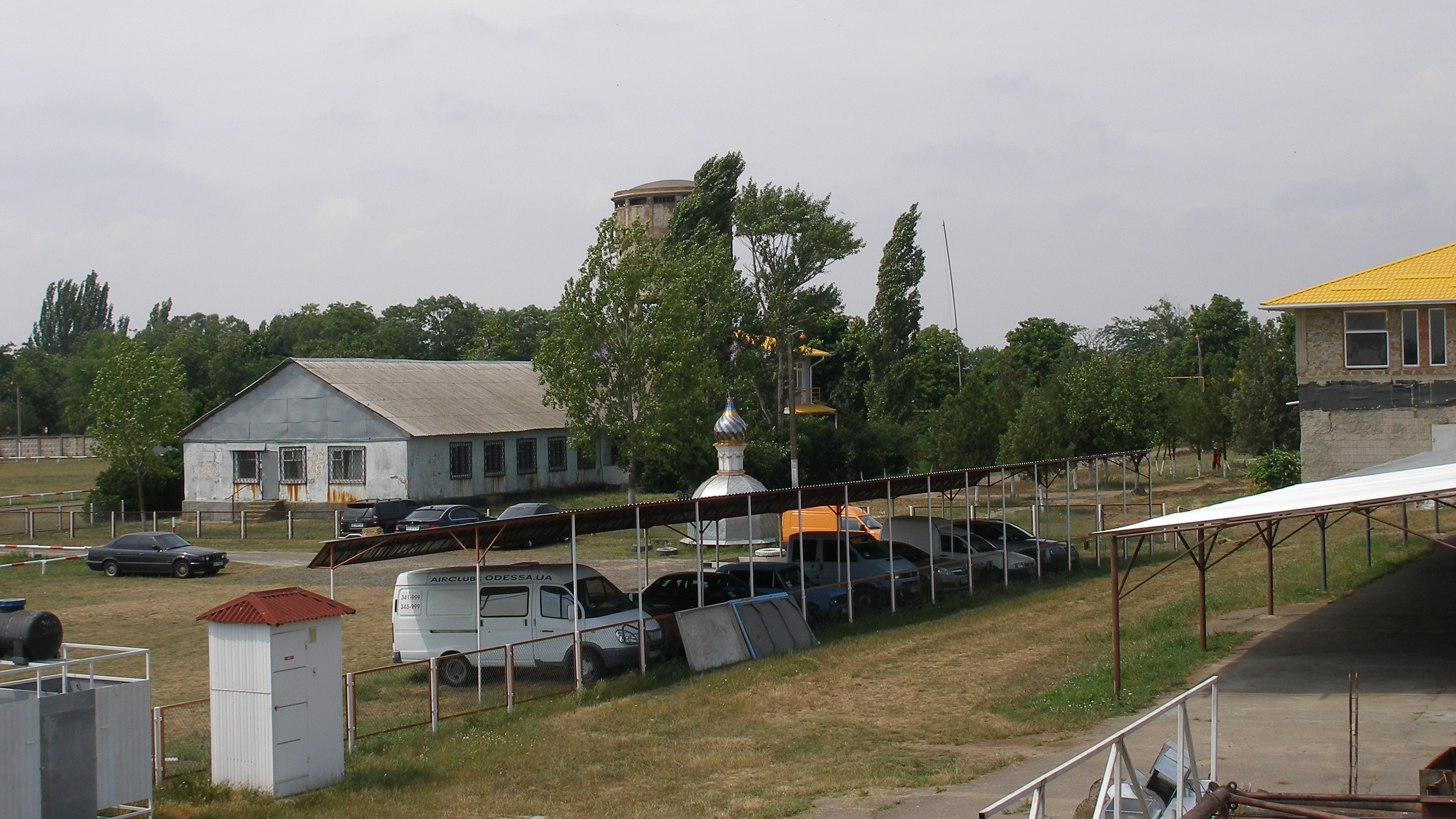
- Etymology: Naberezhne means embankment in the Russian and Ukrainian language.
- Interactive map of Naberezhne
- Location within Odesa Oblast Location within Ukraine
- Coordinates: 46°34′18″N 30°41′53″E
- Country: Ukraine
- Oblast: Odesa Oblast
- Raion: Odesa Raion
- Hromada: Usatove rural hromada
- Founded: 1935–1940's

Area
  - Land: 0.51 km^{2} (0.20 sq mi)
- Elevation: 22 m (72 ft)

Population (2001)
  - Total: 914
  - Density: 1,800/km^{2} (4,600/sq mi)
- Time zone: UTC+2 (EET (Kyiv))
  - Summer (DST): UTC+3 (EEST)
- Postal Code: 67633
- Area code: +380 4852

Naberezhne (Ukrainian: Набережне, Russian: Набережное) is a rural settlement in Ukraine, Odesa Raion, Odesa Oblast. It belongs to Usatove rural hromada, one of the hromadas of Ukraine, and is one of 15 villages in the hromada. It has a population of 914.

Until 18 July 2020, Naberezhne belonged to Biliaivka Raion. The raion was abolished in July 2020 as part of the administrative reform of Ukraine, which reduced the number of raions of Odesa Oblast to seven. The area of Biliaivka Raion was merged into Odesa Raion.

== Population Census ==
As of January 12, 1989, Naberezhne had a population of 841. 837 men and 4 women.

As of December 5, 2001, Naberezhne had a population of 914.

=== Language Distribution ===
It shows Naberezhne's language distribution.

Language Distribution
Language	Percent
Russian	61.24
Ukrainian	37.02
Belarusian	1.52
Bulgarian	0.11
Other/Uncertain	0.11

== See also ==
Usatove
