= Berehove, Odesa Oblast =

Rural locality in Odesa Oblast, Ukraine

Berehove Берегове Beregovoye
- Village
- Interactive map of Berehove
- Location within Odesa Oblast Location within Ukraine
- Coordinates: 46°42′25″N 30°32′32″E
- Country: Ukraine
- Oblast: Odesa Oblast
- Raion: Odesa Raion
- Hromada: Usatove rural hromada

Area
  - Land: 0.35 km^{2} (0.14 sq mi)

Population (2001)
  - Total: 45
  - Density: 130/km^{2} (330/sq mi)
- Time zone: UTC+2 (EET (Kyiv))
  - Summer (DST): UTC+3 (EEST)
- Postal Code: 67631
- Address: 67663, Odesa Oblast, Odesa Raion, Usatove Hromada, Government Avenue, 3

Berehove (Ukrainian: Берегове) is a village in Ukraine, Odesa Raion, in Odesa Oblast. It belongs to Usatove rural hromada, one of the hromadas of Ukraine, and is one of the 15 villages in the hromada. It has a population of about 45 (As of the Ukrainian 2001 Population Census). It has 2 other names that can you can call Berehove: Beregove and Beregovoye.

Until 18 July 2020, Berehove belonged to Biliaivka Raion. The raion was abolished in July 2020 as part of the administrative reform of Ukraine, which reduced the number of raions of Odesa Oblast to seven. The area of Biliaivka Raion was merged into Odesa Raion.

== Population census ==
As of January 12, 1989, Berehove had a population of 43 people.

On December 5, 2001, Berehove had a population of 36 people (7 fewer people than 1989).

2001 and 1989 Population Census comparison
Year and Gender	1989 Census	2001 Census
Men	21	16
Women	22	20

=== Spoken languages ===
Native language	Count	In %
Ukrainian	38	81.9%
Russian	9	19.1%
others or not stated	0	0.0%
Total:	47	100.0%

== See also ==
Chobotarivka
