= Mizhlymanske =

Rural locality in Odesa Oblast, Ukraine

Mizhlymanske Міжлиманське Lativka (before 29.06.2023), Kotovka (before 19.05.2016)
- Village
- Mizhlymanske
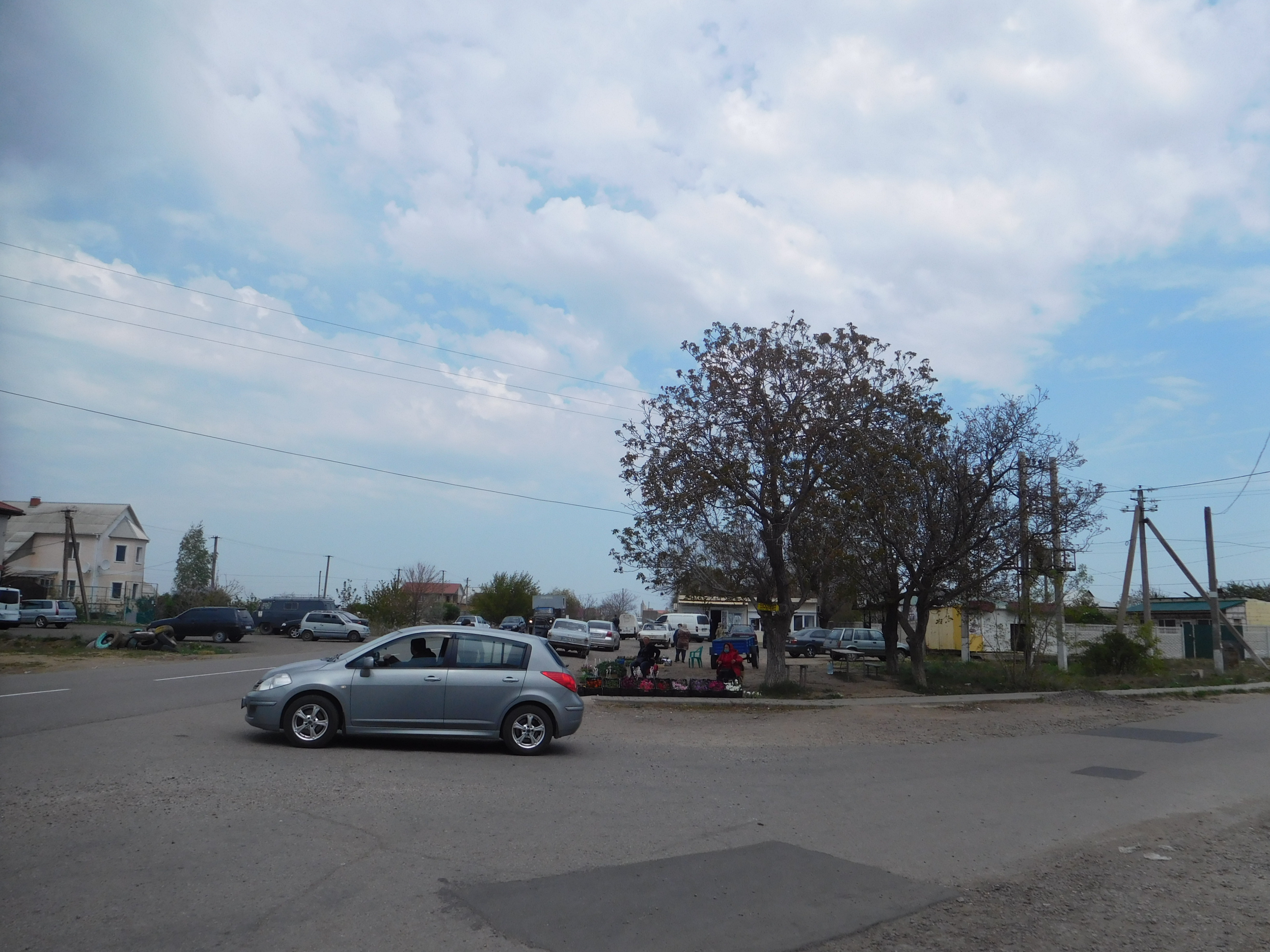
- Interactive map of Mizhlymanske
- Location within Odesa Oblast Location within Ukraine
- Coordinates: 46°33′56″N 30°43′12″E
- Country: Ukraine
- Oblast: Odesa Oblast
- Raion: Odesa Raion
- Hromada: Usatove rural hromada

Area
  - Land: 2.34 km^{2} (0.90 sq mi)

Population (2001)
  - Total: 1,954
  - Density: 835/km^{2} (2,160/sq mi)
- Time zone: UTC+2 (EET (Kyiv))
  - Summer (DST): UTC+3 (EEST)
- Postal Code: 67633
- Address: Odesa Oblast, Odesa Raion, Usatove Hromada, Government Avenue 3

Mizhlymanske (Ukrainian:Міжлиманське) is a village in, Odesa Raion, Odesa Oblast, Ukraine. It belongs to Usatove rural hromada, one of the hromadas of Ukraine, and is one of 15 villages of the hromada. Lativka has a population of 1954 (As of 2001 population census). It is one of four villages in the hromada which had a former name.

Until 18 July 2020, Lativka belonged to Biliaivka Raion. The raion was abolished in July 2020 as part of the administrative reform of Ukraine, which reduced the number of raions of Odesa Oblast to seven. The area of Biliaivka Raion was merged into Odesa Raion.

== Population census ==
As of January 12, 1989, Lativka had a population of 1,673, consisting of 747 men and 926 women. By December 5, 2001, Lativka had a population of 1,954, an increase of 281.

1989 and 2001 population census comparison
Year and Gender	1989	2001
Men	747	879 (Uncertain)
Women	926	1075 (Uncertain)

== See also ==
- Ivan Zhevakhov
