= Tykhe, Odesa Oblast =

Rural locality in Odesa Oblast, Ukraine

Tykhe Тихе Chapaeve, Chapayeve, Chapayevo, Tikhe, Тихе, and Чапаєве
- Village
- Tykhe (Odesa Oblast)
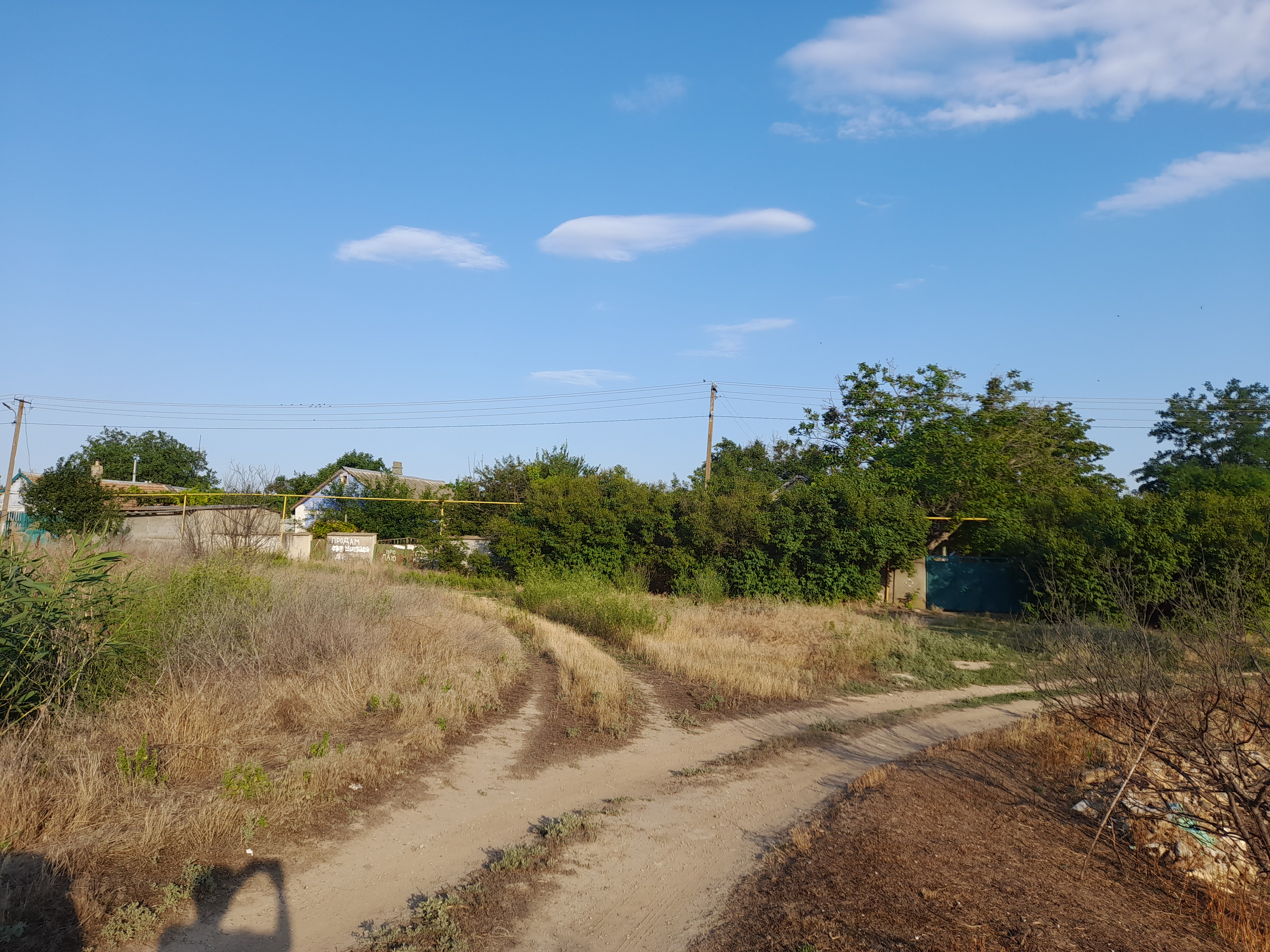
- Interactive map of Tykhe
- Location within Odesa Oblast Location within Ukraine
- Coordinates: 46°40′31″N 30°35′37″E
- Country: Ukraine
- Oblast: Odesa Oblast
- Raion: Odesa Raion
- Hromada: Usatove rural hromada
- Founded: 1915

Area
  - Land: 0.22 km^{2} (0.085 sq mi)
- Elevation: 47 m (154 ft)

Population
  - Total: 51
  - Density: 230/km^{2} (600/sq mi)
- Time zone: UTC+2 (EET (Kyiv))
  - Summer (DST): UTC+3 (EEST)
- Postal Code: 67630
- Address: +380 4852

Tykhe is a village in Ukraine, Odesa Raion, Odesa Oblast. It belongs to Usatove rural hromada, one of the hromadas of Ukraine, and is one of the 15 villages in the hromada. It has a population of 51. Tykhe was formed because of the Constituency 139.

Previously, Tykhe was called as Chapayeve. You can call Tykhe as: Chapaeve, Chapayeve, Chapayevo, and Tikhe. The name means 'quiet', the former one referred to Vasily Chapayev.

Until 18 July 2020, Tykhe belonged to Biliaivka Raion. The raion was abolished in July 2020 as part of the administrative reform of Ukraine, which reduced the number of raions of Odesa Oblast to seven. The area of Biliaivka Raion was merged into Odesa Raion.

== Population census ==
As of January 12, 1989, Chapayeve had a population 27. 12 men and 15 women.

As of December 5, 2001, Chapayeve had a population of 39.

1989 and 2001 population census comparison
	Population as of 1989	Population as of 2001
Men	12	18 (Estimated)
Women	15	21 (Estimated)

=== Language Distribution ===
Tykhe only has 2 native languages.

Language Distribution
Language	Percent
Ukrainian	92.31%
Russian	5.13%
Others	2.38%

== See also ==
Usatove
