= Tykhe =

Tykhe (Ukrainian: Тихе literally "quiet") is the name of several localities in Ukraine. It may refer to:

- Tykhe, Dnipro Raion, Dnipropetrovsk Oblast
- Tykhe, Pokrovske settlement hromada, Synelnykove Raion, Dnipropetrovsk Oblast
- Tykhe, Vasylkivka settlement hromada, Synelnykove Raion, Dnipropetrovsk Oblast
- Tykhe, Chernihiv Oblast
- Tykhe, Kharkiv Oblast
- Tykhe, Odesa Oblast
- Tykhe, Rivne Oblast

== See also ==
- Tyche (disambiguation)
