= Nova Emetivka =

Rural locality in Odesa Oblast, Ukraine

Nova Emetivka Нова Еметівка
- Village
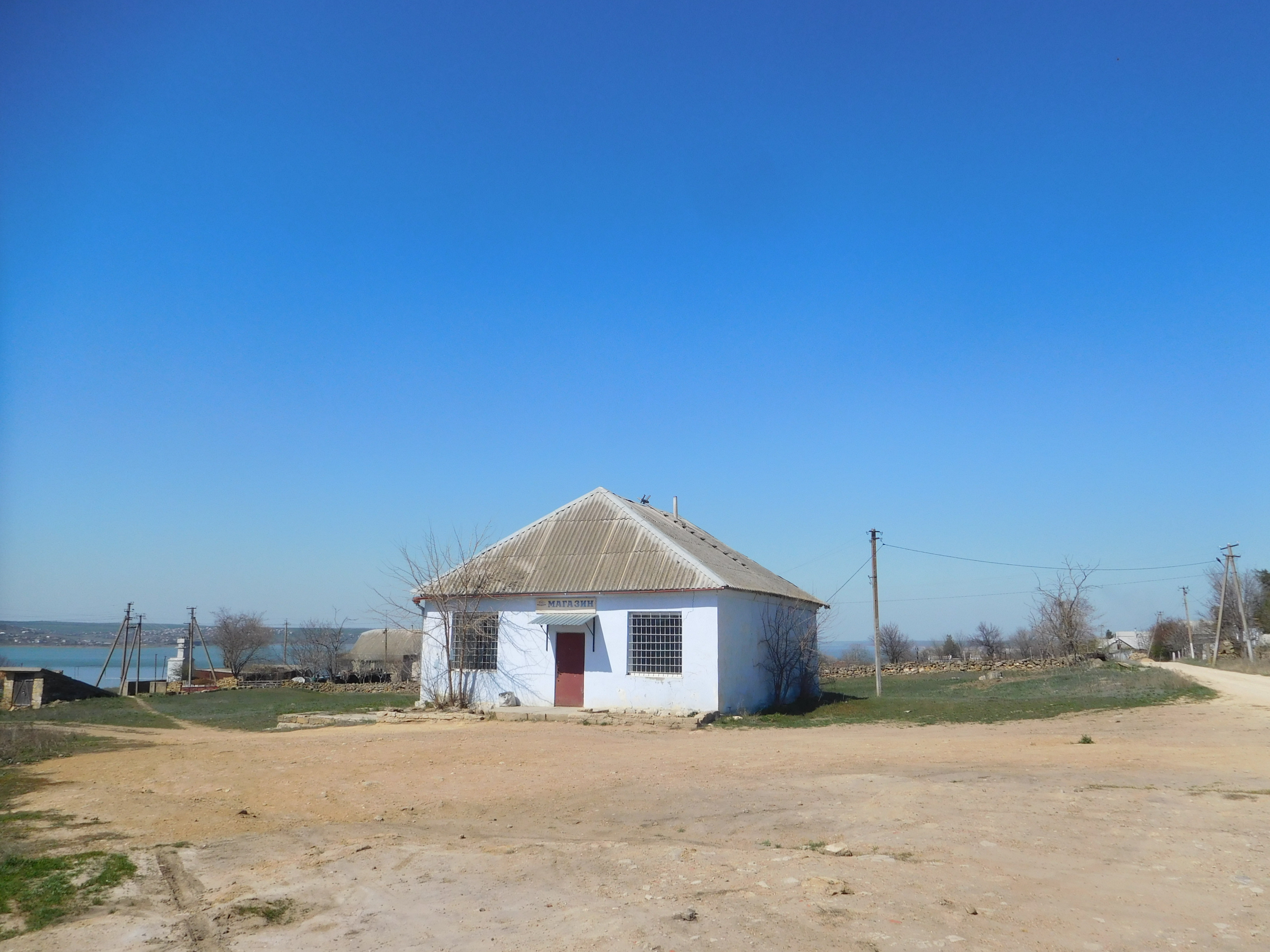
- A house in Nova Emetivka
- Interactive map of Nova Emetivka
- Location within Odesa Oblast Location within Ukraine
- Coordinates: 46°43′51″N 30°31′57″E
- Country: Ukraine
- Oblast: Odesa Oblast
- Raion: Odesa Raion
- Hromada: Usatove rural hromada
- Founded: 1880's

Area
  - Land: 2.92 km^{2} (1.13 sq mi)
- Elevation: 64 m (210 ft)

Population
  - Total: 374
  - Density: 128/km^{2} (332/sq mi)
- Time zone: UTC+2 (EET (Kyiv))
  - Summer (DST): UTC+3 (EEST)
- Postal Code: 67631
- Address: +380 4852

Nova Emetivka Ukrainian: Нова Еметівка is a village in Ukraine, Odesa Raion, Odesa Oblast. It belongs to Usatove rural hromada, one of the hromadas of Ukraine and is one of 15 villages of the hromada. Nova Emetivka has a population of 374. It was founded because of the Constituency 139.

Until 18 July 2020, Nova Emetivka belonged to Biliaivka Raion. The raion was abolished in July 2020 as part of the administrative reform of Ukraine, which reduced the number of raions of Odesa Oblast to seven. The area of Biliaivka Raion was merged into Odesa Raion.

== Population Census ==
As of January 12, 1989, Nova Emetivka had a population of 437 (438 for constant). 209 of them are men and 228 are women (229 for constant).

As of December 5, 2001, Nova Emetivka has a population of 404.

=== Language ===
It shows the language distribution. There are languages that are in Nova Emetivka.

Language
Language Name	Percentage
Ukrainian	70%
Russian	27%
Moldovan	3%

== See also ==
- Usatove
