= Illinka =

Illinka (Ukrainian: Іллінка) may refer to several places in Ukraine:

- Illinka, Krasnoperekopsk Raion, Crimea, village in Krasnoperekopsk Raion
- Illinka, Saky Raion, Crimea, village in Saky Raion
- Illinka, Kamianske Raion, Dnipropetrovsk Oblast, village in Kamianske Raion
- Illinka, Nikopol Raion, Dnipropetrovsk Oblast, village in Nikopol Raion
- Illinka, Horlivka Raion, Donetsk Oblast, rural settlement in Horlivka Raion
- Illinka, Kurakhove urban hromada, Pokrovsk Raion, Donetsk Oblast, urban-type settlement in Pokrovsk Raion
- Illinka, Marinka urban hromada, Pokrovsk Raion, Donetsk Oblast, village in Pokrovsk Raion
- Illinka, Kherson Oblast, rural settlement in Kakhovka Raion
- Illinka, Antratsyt Raion, Luhansk Oblast, village in Antratsyt Raion
- Illinka, Svatove Raion, Luhansk Oblast, village in Svatove Raion
- Illinka, Odesa Oblast, village in Odesa Raion
