= Avhustivka, Odesa Oblast =

Rural locality in Odesa Oblast, Ukraine

Avhustivka Августівка Avgustivka, Avgustovka, and Moskovka
- Village
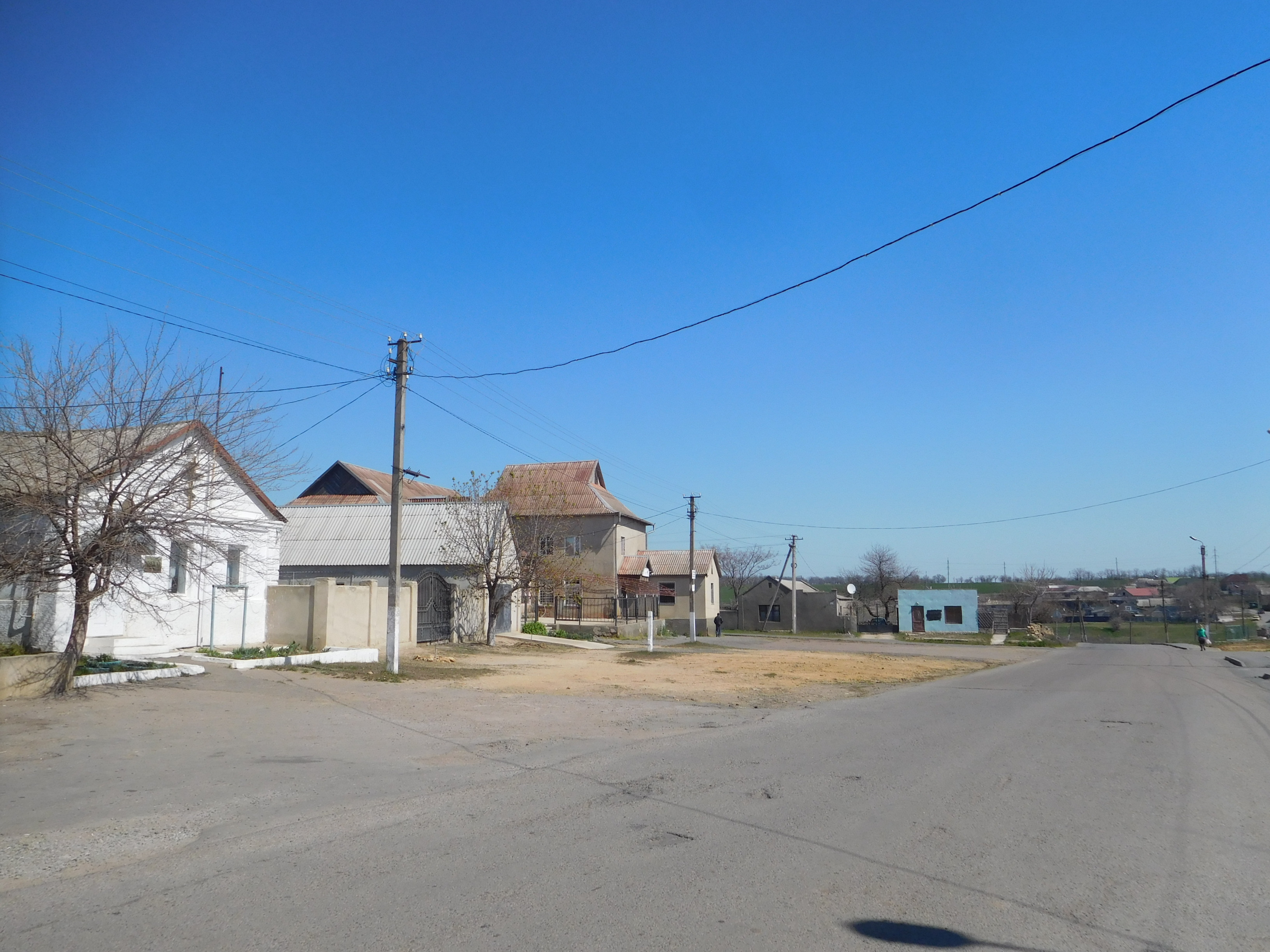
- Central street of the village
- Interactive map of Avhustivka
- Location within Odesa Oblast Location within Ukraine
- Coordinates: 46°38′26″N 30°38′49″E
- Country: Ukraine
- Oblast: Odesa Oblast
- Raion: Odesa Raion
- Hromada: Usatove rural hromada
- Date Established: 1850

Area
  - Total: 1.87 km^{2} (0.72 sq mi)

Population (2001)
  - Total: 1,392
  - Density: 744/km^{2} (1,930/sq mi)
- Time zone: UTC+2 (EET (Kyiv))
  - Summer (DST): UTC+3 (EEST)
- Postal code: 67632

Avhustivka is a village in Ukraine, in Odesa Raion, Odesa Oblast. It has a population of about 1432 (as of 2001 census). It belongs to Usatove rural hromada, one of the hromadas of Ukraine.

== History ==
On the territory of the village, a Chernyakhov culture settlement dating to the 3rd-4th centuries AD was found.

The village was founded on 14 June 1850. It was originally called Moskovka, but was later renamed in honor of Count August Ilyinsky, a member of the Russian nobility who was granted land allotments in the village. During Soviet times, there was a collective farm named after Red Army officer Grigory Kotovsky located in the village, which specialized in grain and dairy production with a total of 5,633 hectares of agricultural land. There were also three repair shops, a mill, a winery, a lime kiln, and a shop for reinforced concrete slabs. During World War II, the front line approached the village.

Until 18 July 2020, Avhustivka belonged to Biliaivka Raion. The raion was abolished in July 2020 as part of the administrative reform of Ukraine, which reduced the number of raions of Odesa Oblast to seven. The area of Biliaivka Raion was merged into Odesa Raion.

== Monuments ==
A mass grave honoring the defenders of Odesa during World War II is located near the village on the Odesa-Balta road. Inscriptions on the monument commemorate the 136th Rifle Division of the Red Army during their battles to hold the front line in late 1941.
