= Usatove rural hromada =

Coordinates: 46°37′49.940″N 30°40′1.081″E

Usatove rural hromada Усатівська сільська громада
- Hromada
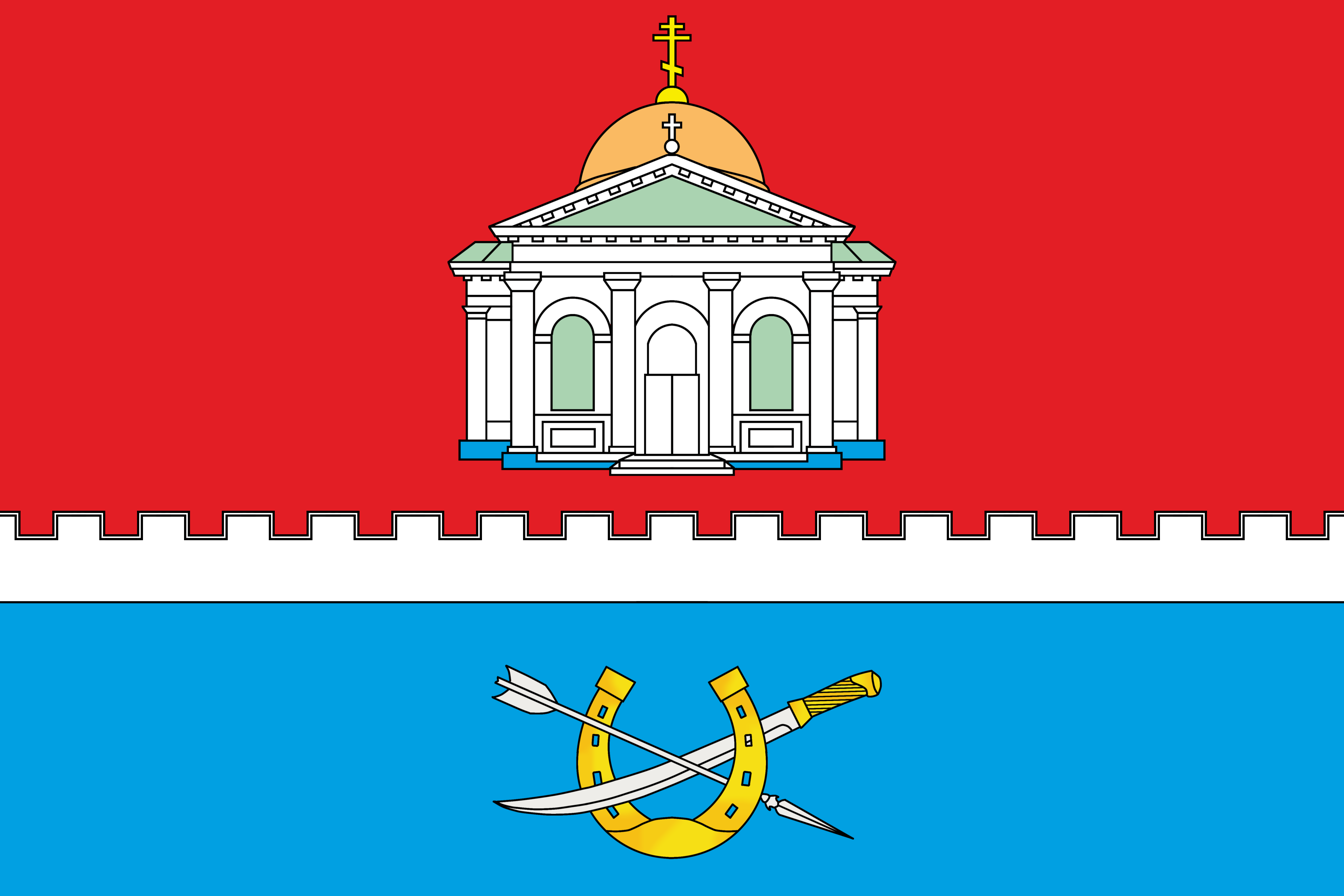
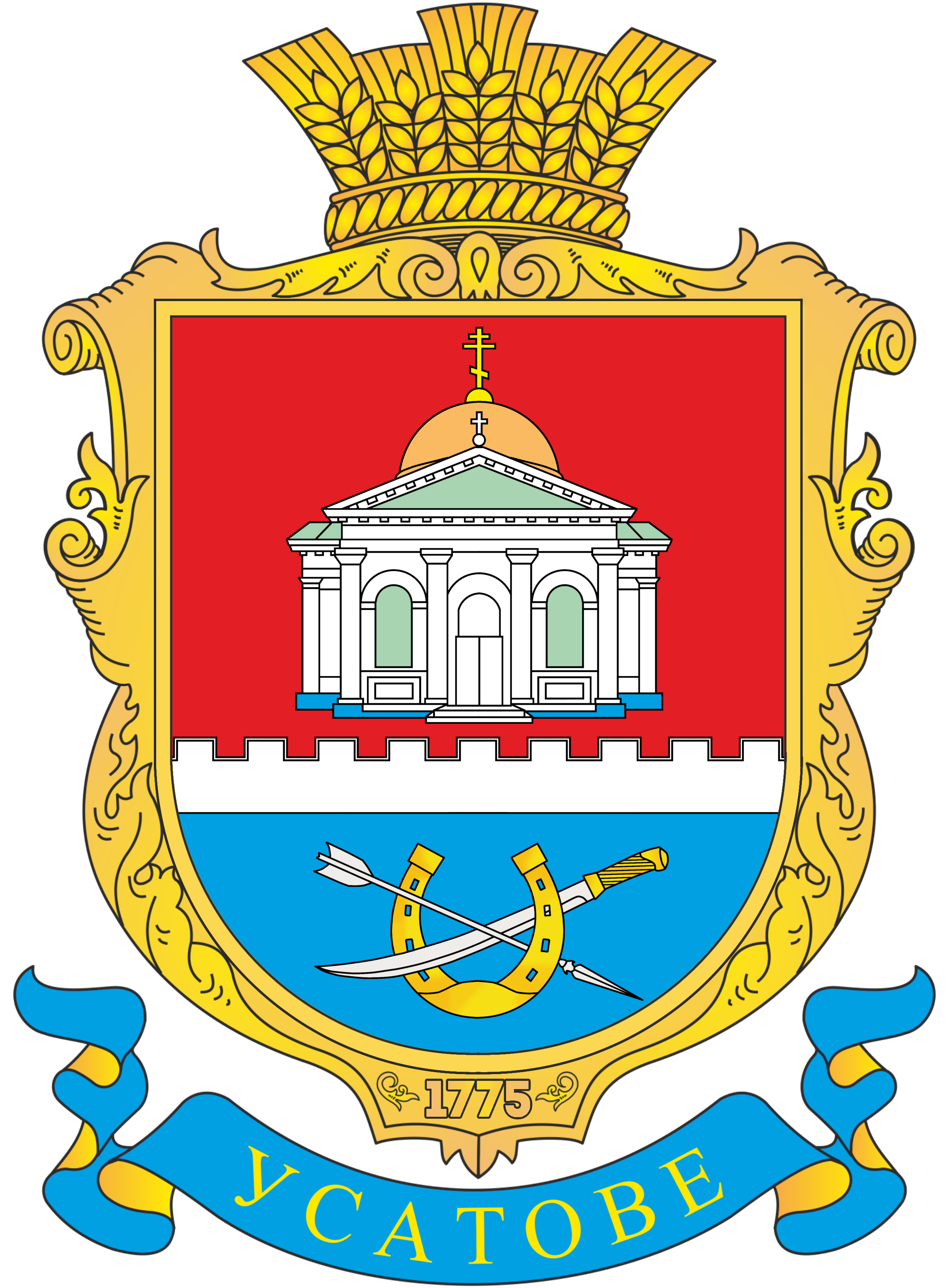
- Flag Coat of arms
- Interactive map of Usatove rural hromada
- Country: Ukraine
- Oblast: Odesa Oblast
- Raion: Odesa Raion
- Admin. center: Usatove

Area
  - Total: 247.4 km^{2} (95.5 sq mi)

Population (2022)
  - Total: 15,016
  - Density: 60.70/km^{2} (157.2/sq mi)
- CATOTTG code: UA51100330000051757
- Settlements: 15
- Rural settlements: 2
- Villages: 13

Usatove rural hromada (Ukrainian: Усатівська сільська громада) is a hromada in Odesa Raion of Odesa Oblast in southwestern Ukraine. Population: 15,016 (2022 estimate)

The hromada consists of 15 villages:

- Avhustivka
- Berehove
- Chobotarivka
- Cherevychne
- Illinka
- Kovalivka
- Marynivka
- Mizhlymanske
- Naberezhne
- Nova Emetivka
- Nova Kovalivka
- Protopopivka
- Stara Emetivka
- Tykhe
- Usatove (seat of administration)

Until 18 July 2020, the hromada belonged to Biliaivka Raion. The raion was abolished in July 2020 as part of the administrative reform of Ukraine, which reduced the number of raions of Odesa Oblast to seven. The area of Biliaivka Raion was merged into Odesa Raion.
