= Illinka, Odesa Oblast =

Rural locality in Odesa Oblast, Ukraine

Illinka Іллінка Il'inka, Il’inka, and Іллінка
- Village
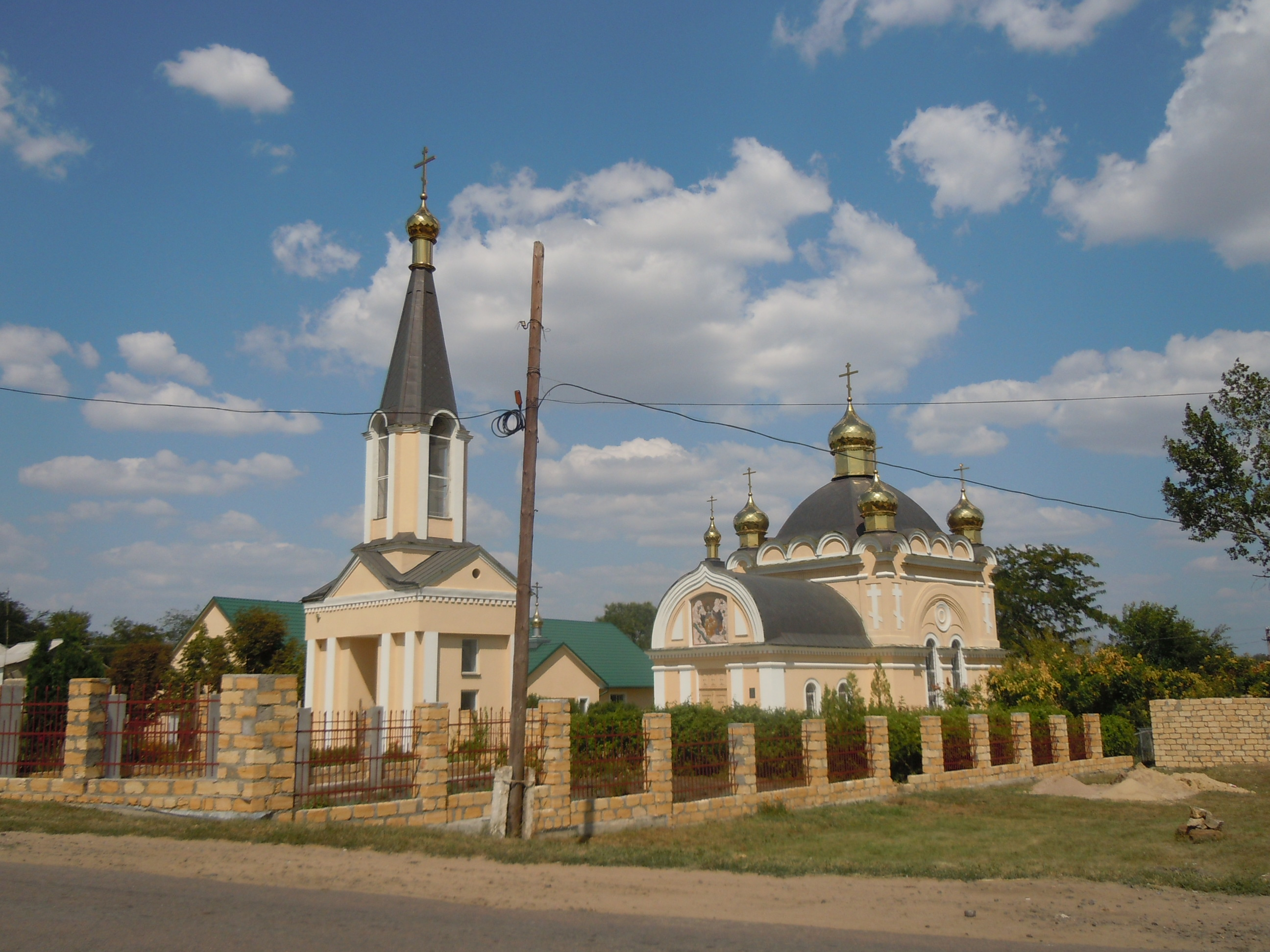
- Interactive map of Illinka
- Location within Odesa Oblast Location within Ukraine
- Coordinates: 46°41′N 30°38′E
- Country: Ukraine
- Oblast: Odesa Oblast
- Raion: Odesa Raion
- Hromada: Usatove rural hromada

Area
  - Land: 2.11 km^{2} (0.81 sq mi)

Population (2001)
  - Total: 1,291
  - Density: 612/km^{2} (1,580/sq mi)
- Time zone: UTC+2 (EET (Kyiv))
  - Summer (DST): UTC+3 (EEST)
- Postal Code: 67663
- Address: Odesa Oblast, Odesa Raion, Usatove Hromada, Government Avenue 3

Illinka is a village in Ukraine, Odesa Raion, in Odesa Oblast. It belongs to Usatove rural hromada, one of the hromadas of Ukraine, and is one of the 15 villages in the hromada. It has a population of 1,291 people as of the 2001 census. The village was formed in the 19th century.

Until 18 July 2020, Illinka belonged to Biliaivka Raion. The raion was abolished in July 2020 as part of the administrative reform of Ukraine, which reduced the number of raions of Odesa Oblast to seven. The area of Biliaivka Raion was merged into Odesa Raion.

== Population Census ==
On January 12, 1989, the population was 1,267; of whom 661 were female and 606 male.

On 2001, the population was 1,291.
