= Marynivka, Odesa Oblast =

Rural locality in Odesa Oblast, Ukraine

Marynivka Маринівка Marinivka, Marinovka, and Маринівка
- Village
- Marynivka (Odesa Oblast)
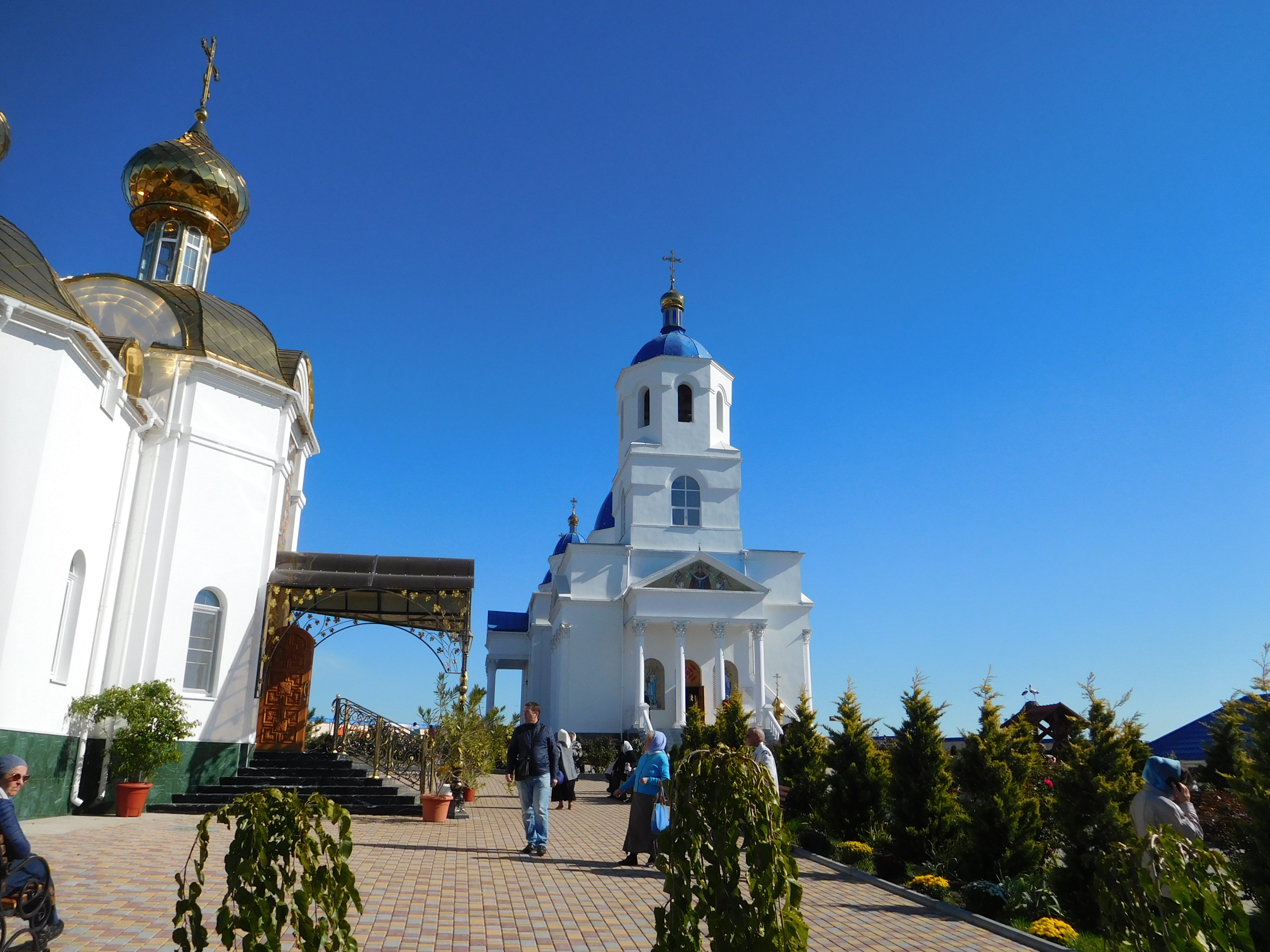
- Skete of the Intercession in Marynivka
- Interactive map of Marynivka
- Location within Odesa Oblast Location within Ukraine
- Coordinates: 46°45′33″N 30°31′44″E
- Country: Ukraine
- Oblast: Odesa Oblast
- Raion: Odesa Raion
- Hromada: Usatove rural hromada
- Founded: 1797

Area
  - Land: 2.92 km^{2} (1.13 sq mi)
- Elevation: 16 m (52 ft)

Population
  - Total: 612
  - Density: 210/km^{2} (543/sq mi)
- Time zone: UTC+2 (EET (Kyiv))
  - Summer (DST): UTC+3 (EEST)
- Postal Code: 67631
- Address: Odesa Oblast, Odesa Raion, Usatove, Government Avenue 3

Marynivka (Ukrainian: Маринівка) is a village in the Odesa Raion, Odesa Oblast, Ukraine. It belongs to Usatove rural hromada, one of the hromadas of Ukraine, and is one of the 15 villages in the hromada. Marynivka has a population of 612. It was founded in 1797 and named after a daughter of the count Lev Potocki, Maryna Potocka. There are two other names that you can call, which are Marinivka and Marinovka.

Until 18 July 2020, Marynivka belonged to Biliaivka Raion. The raion was abolished in July 2020 as part of the administrative reform of Ukraine, which reduced the number of raions of Odesa Oblast to seven. The area of Biliaivka Raion was merged into Odesa Raion.

== Population Census ==
As of the 1989 Population Census, Marynivka had a population of 477. 270 of them are women (The majority), 207 of them are men.

As of the 2001 Census, Marynivka had a population of 574.

1989 and 2001 population census comparison
Year and Gender	1989	2001
Men	207	251 (Estimated)
Women	270	323 (Estimated)
