= Malynivka =

Malynivka may refer to:

- Malynivka, Kharkiv Oblast, an urban locality (an urban-type settlement) in Kharkiv Oblast, Ukraine
- Malynivka, Chernivtsi Oblast, a rural locality in Chernivtsi Oblast, Ukraine
- Malynivka, Polohy Raion, Zaporizhzhia Oblast, a village in Zaporizhzhia Oblast, Ukraine

== See also ==
- Marynivka
