= Kovalivka, Odesa Oblast =

Rural locality in Odesa Oblast, Ukraine

Kovalivka Ковалівка Kovalevka, Kovalëvka, and Ковалівка
- Village
- Kovalivka (Usatove Hromada)
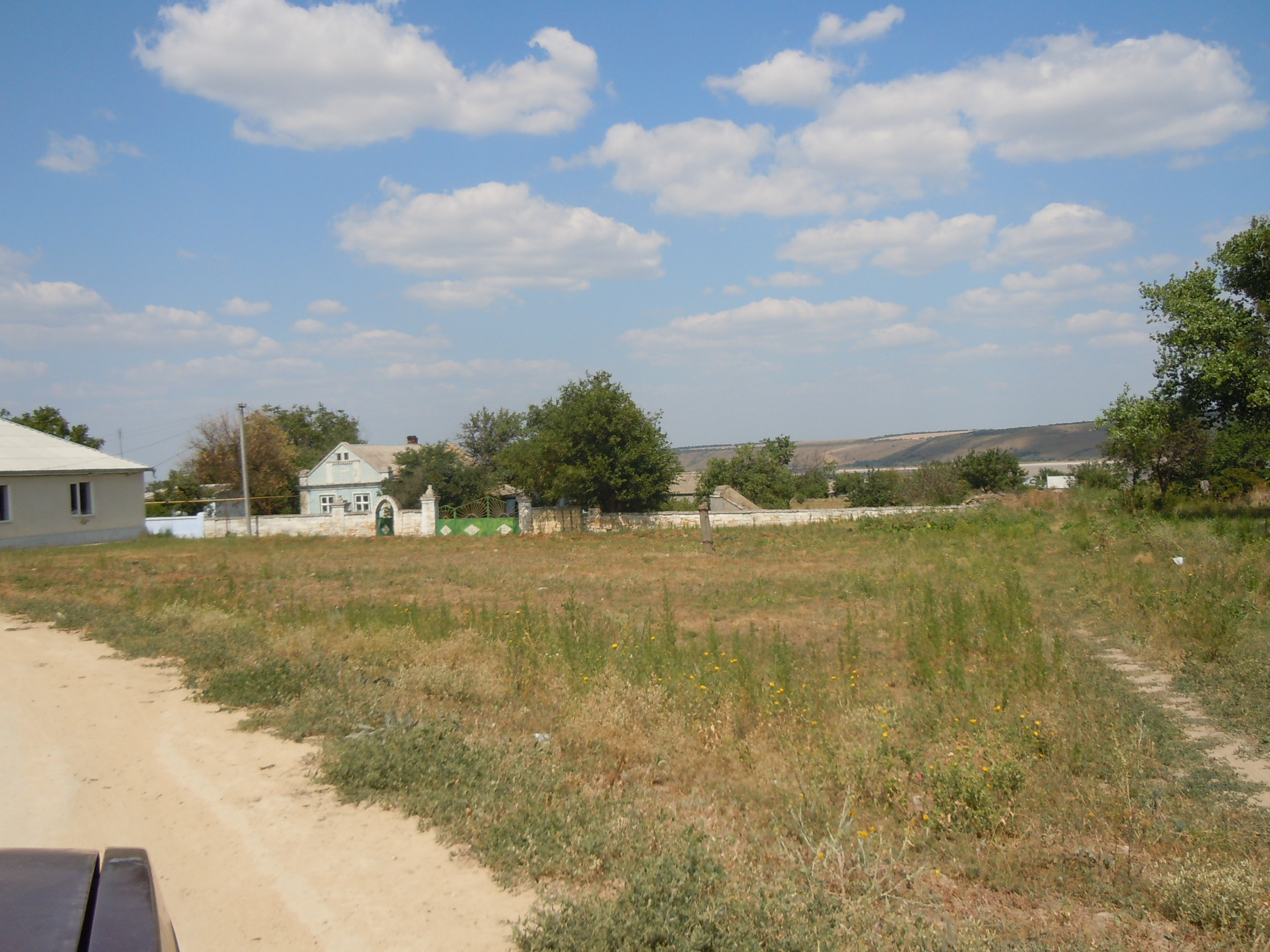
- Interactive map of Kovalivka
- Location within Odesa Oblast Location within Ukraine
- Coordinates: 46°42′32″N 30°36′17″E
- Country: Ukraine
- Oblast: Odesa Oblast
- Raion: Odesa Raion
- Hromada: Usatove rural hromada

Area
  - Land: 0.44 km^{2} (0.17 sq mi)

Population (2001)
  - Total: 217
  - Density: 490/km^{2} (1,300/sq mi)
- Time zone: UTC+2 (EET (Kyiv))
  - Summer (DST): UTC+3 (EEST)
- Postal Code: 67630
- Address: Odesa Oblast, Odesa Raion, Usatove Hromada, Government Avenue 3

Kovalivka (Ukrainian: Ковалівка, pronounced Kovalevka / Kovaliovka) is a village in Ukraine, Odesa Raion, Odesa Oblast. It belongs to Usatove rural hromada, one of the hromadas of Ukraine, and is one of the 15 villages in the hromada. It has a population of about 217.

Until 18 July 2020, Kovalivka belonged to Biliaivka Raion. The raion was abolished in July 2020 as part of the administrative reform of Ukraine, which reduced the number of raions of Odesa Oblast to seven. The area of Biliaivka Raion was merged into Odesa Raion.

== Population Census ==
As of the 1989 Ukrainian Population Census, Kovalivka had a population of 241; 114 men, and 127 women.

As of the 2001 Ukrainian Population Census, Kovalivka has a population of 222 (19 fewer people than 1989).

1989 and 2001 Ukrainian Population Census comparison
Year and Gender	1989 Census	2001 Census
Men	114	104 (Uncertain)
Women	127	118 (Uncertain)
