= Krasnosilka rural hromada =

Coordinates: 46°44′N 30°40′E

Krasnosilka rural hromada Красносільська сільська громада
- Hromada
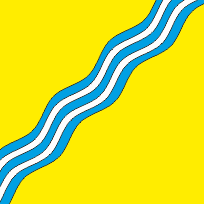
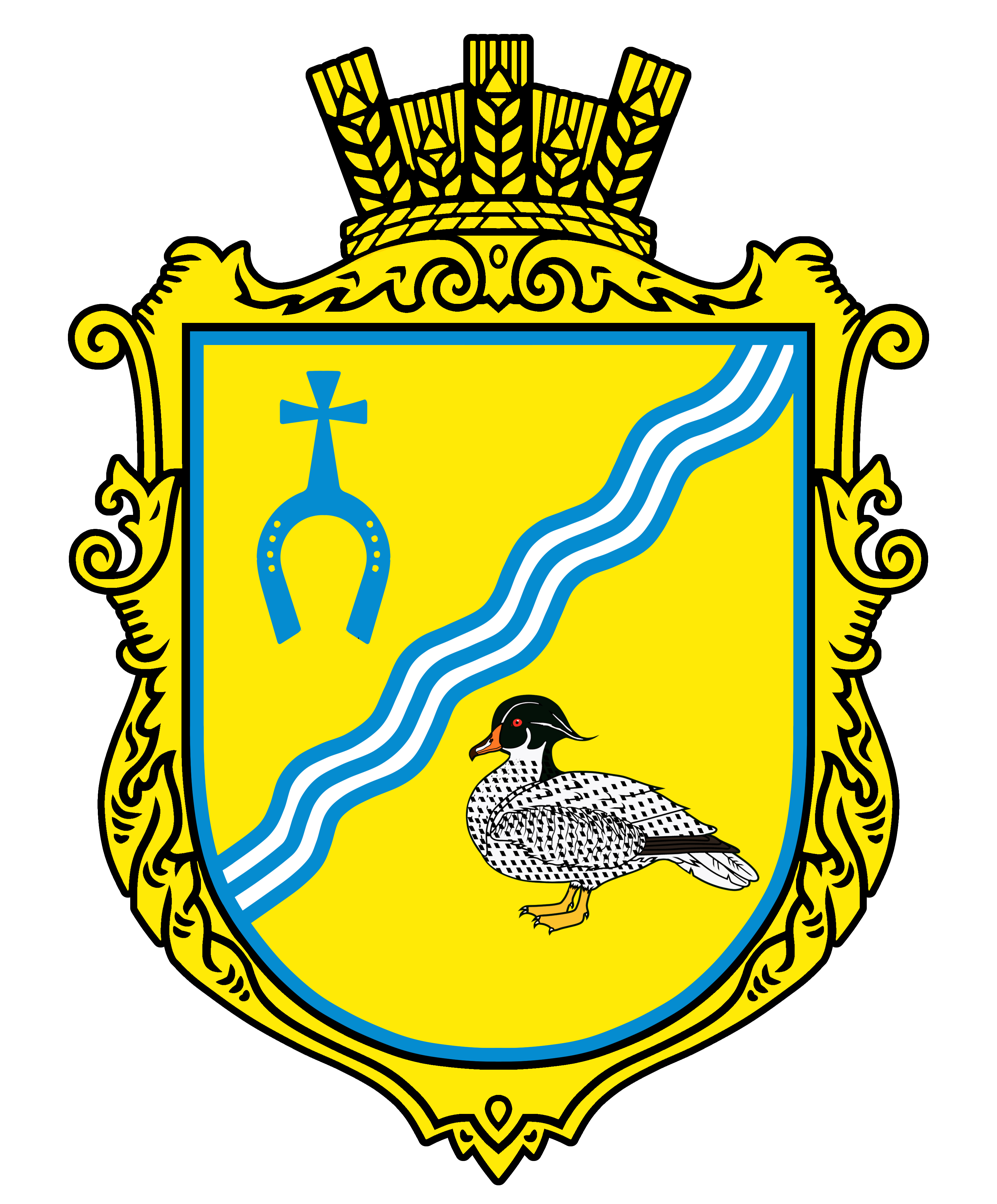
- Flag Coat of arms
- Interactive map of Krasnosilka rural hromada
- Country: Ukraine
- Oblast: Odesa Oblast
- Raion: Odesa Raion
- Admin. center: Krasnosilka

Area
  - Total: 262.63 km^{2} (101.40 sq mi)

Population (2015)
  - Total: 10,932
  - Density: 41.625/km^{2} (107.81/sq mi)
- CATOTTG code: UA51100190000060999
- Settlements: 14
- Villages: 14
- Website: krasnosilska-gromada.gov.ua

Krasnosilka rural hromada (Ukrainian: Красносільська сільська громада) is a hromada of Ukraine, located in Odesa Raion, Odesa Oblast. Its administrative center is the village Krasnosilka. It was created by the decision of the Odesa regional council on August 12, 2015, as part of the administrative and territorial reform of 2015–2020.

The first elections were held on October 25, 2015. The area is 262.63 km^{2}, the population is 10,932 inhabitants (2015), and it contains 14 villages. The territory of the hromada overlooks the coast of the Kuialnyk Estuary.

== Villages of the hromada ==
- Bukachi
- Vasylivka
- Ivanove
- Ilichanka
- Korsuntsi
- Krasnosilka (seat of administration)
- Kubanka
- Lyzynka
- Novi Shompole
- Novokubanka
- Pavlinka
- Peremozhne
- Sozonivka
- Shamanivka
