= Zatyshshia settlement hromada =

Coordinates: 47°20′07″N 29°52′15″E

Zatyshshia settlement hromada Затишанська селищна громада
- Hromada
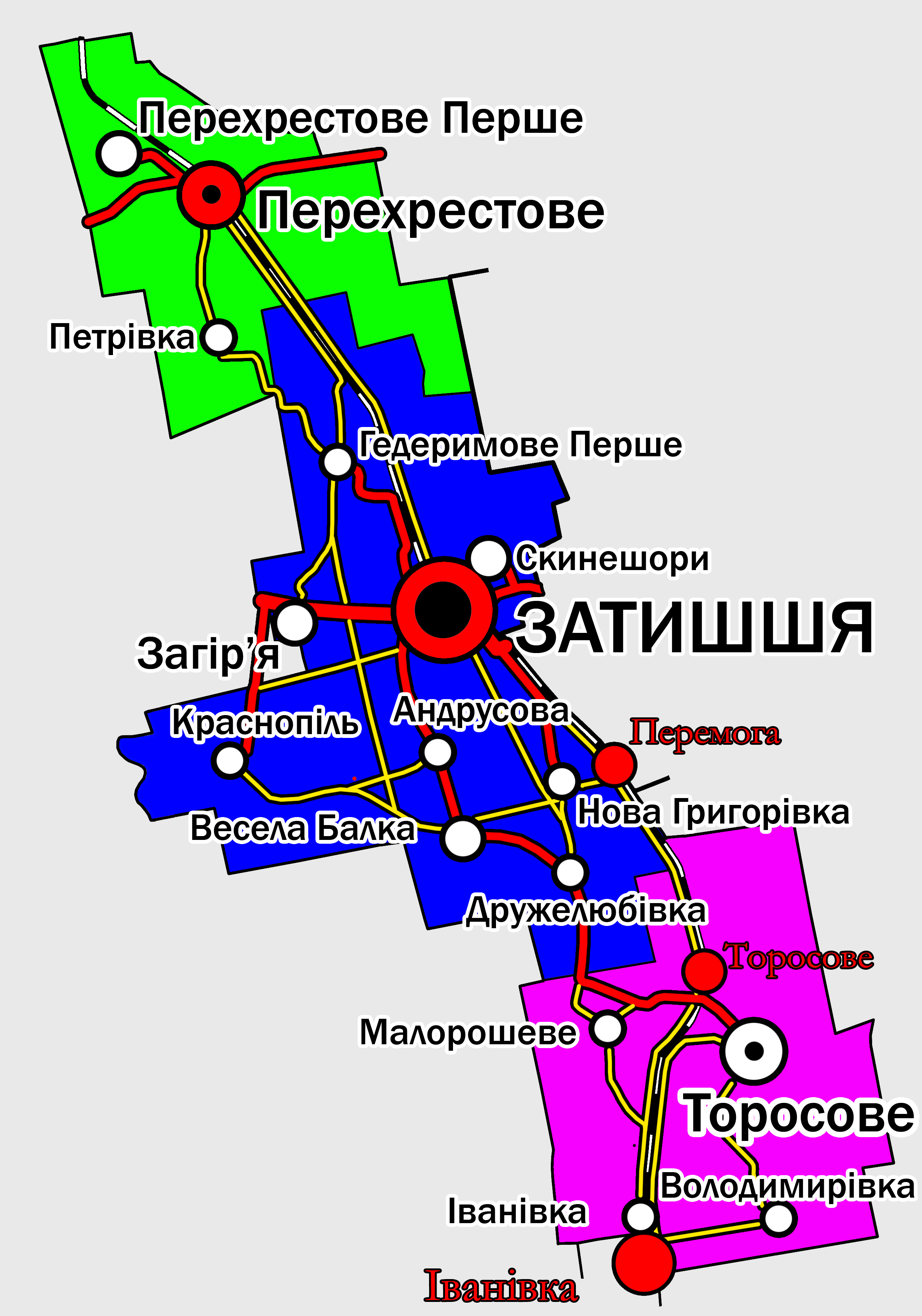
- Country: Ukraine
- Oblast: Odesa Oblast
- Raion: Rozdilna Raion
- Admin. center: Zatyshshia

Area
  - Total: 227.1 km^{2} (87.7 sq mi)

Population (2022)
  - Total: 6,477
  - Density: 28.52/km^{2} (73.87/sq mi)
- CATOTTG code: UA51140050000054980
- Settlements: 16
- Rural settlements: 1
- Villages: 15

Zatyshshia settlement hromada (Ukrainian: Затишанська селищна громада) is a hromada in Rozdilna Raion of Odesa Oblast in southwestern Ukraine. Population: 6,477 (2022 estimate)

The hromada consists of a rural settlement of Zatyshshia and 15 villages:

- Andrusova
- Hederymove Pershe
- Druzheliubivka
- Ivanivka
- Krasnopil
- Malorosheve
- Nova Hryhorivka
- Perekhrestove
- Perekhrestove Pershe
- Petrivka
- Skyneshory
- Torosove
- Vesela Balka
- Volodymyrivka
- Zahirya
