= Tyche (disambiguation) =

Tyche is an ancient Greek goddess.

Tyche may also refer to:

- Tyche of Constantinople, personification of Constantinople
- 258 Tyche, an asteroid
- Tyche (hypothetical planet), hypothetical gas giant planet in the oort cloud, now disproven
- Tyche Tessera, a feature on Venus
- Tyche (satellite), an Earth observation satellite operated by United Kingdom Space Command
- Tyche, a suburb of the city of Syracuse, Sicily

== See also ==
- Tykhe, the name of several localities in Ukraine
