= Vesela Balka, Rozdilna Raion, Odesa Oblast =

Rural locality in Odesa Oblast, Ukraine

Vesela Balka Весела Балка
- Location in Ukraine
- Coordinates: 47°16′58″N 29°52′32″E
- Country: Ukraine
- Oblast: Odesa Oblast
- Raion: Rozdilna Raion
- Hromada: Zatyshshia settlement hromada

Area
  - Total: 0.46 km^{2} (0.18 sq mi)

Population (2011)
  - Total: 179
  - Density: 390/km^{2} (1,000/sq mi)
- Time zone: UTC+3 (+2)
- Postal code: 66741
- Area code: +380 4860

Vesela Balka (Ukrainian: Весела Балка, Russian: Весёлая Балка) is a village in Rozdilna Raion, Odesa Oblast, Ukraine. It belongs to Zatyshshia settlement hromada, one of the hromadas of Ukraine. Population is 179.

Until 18 July 2020, Vesela Balka belonged to Zakharivka Raion. The raion was abolished in July 2020 as part of the administrative reform of Ukraine, which reduced the number of raions of Odesa Oblast to seven. The area of Zakharivka Raion was merged into Rozdilna Raion.
