= Velykyi Dalnyk =

Rural locality in Odesa Oblast, Ukraine

Velykyi Dalnyk Великий Дальник
- Village
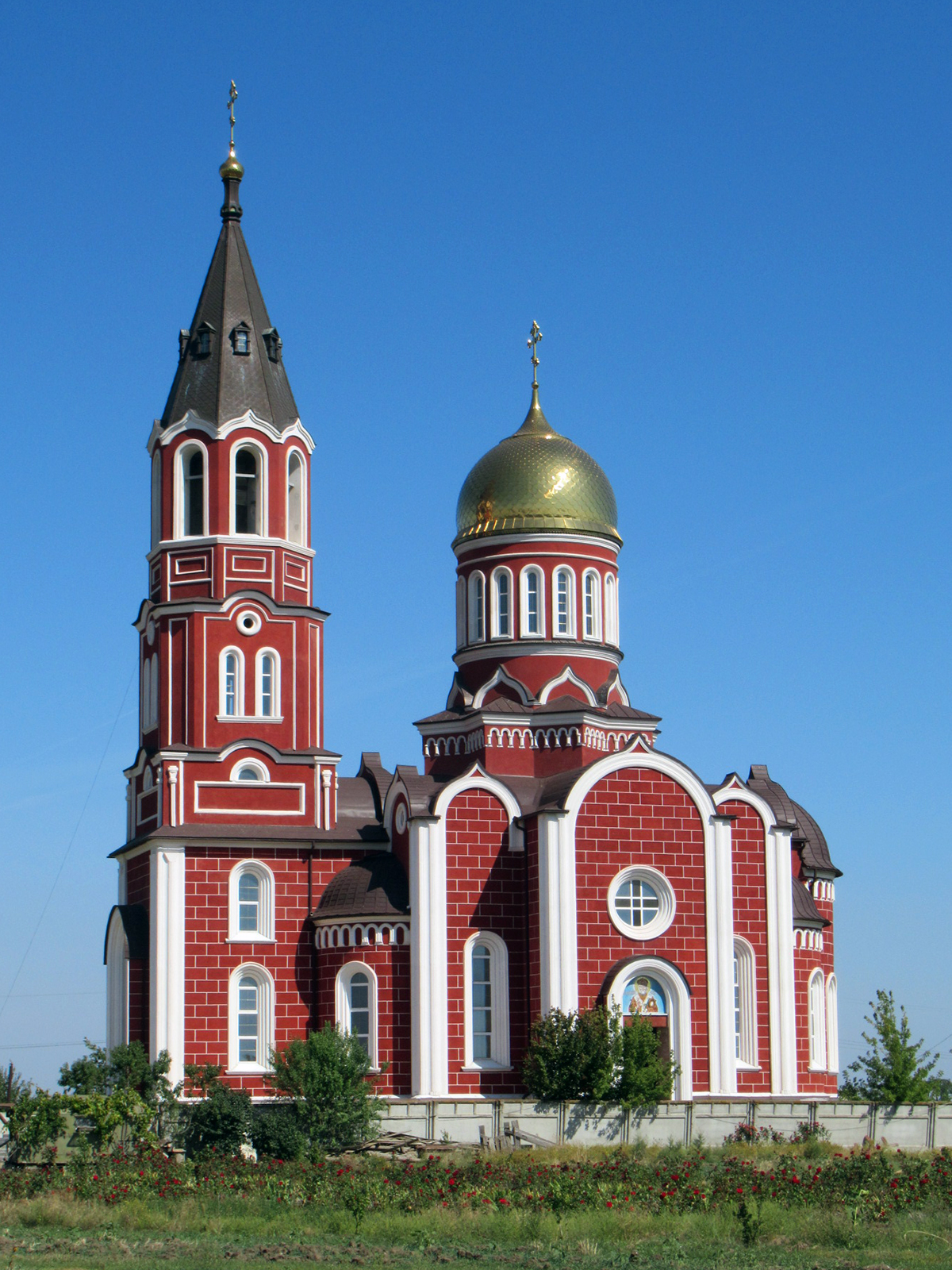

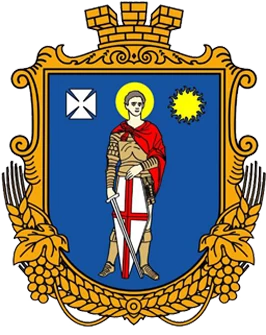
- Coat of arms

- Location of Velykyi Dalnyk in Odesa Oblast Velykyi Dalnyk (Ukraine)
- Coordinates: 46°27′57″N 30°33′30″E
- Country: Ukraine
- Oblast: Odesa Oblast
- Raion: Odesa Raion
- Hromada: Velykyi Dalnyk rural hromada
- Founded: 1795

Area
  - Total: 15.75 km^{2} (6.08 sq mi)
- Elevation: 45 m (148 ft)

Population (2026)
  - Total: 14,000
  - Density: 890/km^{2} (2,300/sq mi)
- Time zone: UTC+2 (EET)
  - Summer (DST): UTC+3 (EEST)
- Postal code: 67668
- Area code: +380 4852
- Climate: Dfa

Velykyi Dalnyk (Ukrainian: Великий Дальник) is a village (a selo) in Odesa Raion (district) of Odesa Oblast in southern Ukraine. It hosts the administration of Velykyi Dalnyk rural hromada, one of the hromadas of Ukraine.

Until 18 July 2020, Velykyi Dalnyk belonged to Biliaivka Raion. The raion was abolished in July 2020 as part of the administrative reform of Ukraine, which reduced the number of raions of Odesa Oblast to seven. The area of Biliaivka Raion was merged into Odesa Raion.

The population is 14 000 people as of 2026. Postal code — 67668. Telephone code — 4852. Area — 15.75 km². KOATUU code — 5121081401.

The Velykodalnytska village council administers the settlements of Petrodolynske and Chervonyi Rasselenets.

In Velykyi Dalnyk, the central estate of the state farm “Druzhba” is located, which has 10,998 hectares of agricultural land, including 9,045 hectares of arable land.

The village has two lyceums, Lyceum Number 1 and Lyceum Number 2. Together they employ 108 teachers, have 59 classes, and educate 1,413 schoolchildren. The village also has a cultural center with a hall for 350 seats, three libraries with a collection of 25,800 volumes, a local hospital with 75 beds (18 doctors and 142 medical staff with secondary specialized education), and a pharmacy. There are six kindergartens with 240 places, a bakery, 15 shops, household service workshops, a school-bakery, two canteens, a post office, a radio center, and a savings bank.

== history ==
During the Holodomor of 1932–1933, organized by the Soviet authorities, at least 129 residents of the village died.

The village was established in 1945 by decree of the Presidium of the Supreme Soviet of the Ukrainian SSR through the merger of the villages Dalnyk Pershyi Kvartal and Dalnyk Druhyi Kvartal. At the same time, the villages Dalnyk Tretii Kvartal and Dalnyk Chetvertii Kvartal were merged into the village of Dalnyk. Later, in 1963, these two villages merged into the single village of Velykyi Dalnyk.

The local economy is focused on vegetable and dairy farming. Subsidiary enterprises include a feed mill, mechanical workshops, and a tomato processing plant. For labor achievements, 52 residents of the village were awarded orders and medals of the USSR, including the Order of Lenin — to M. H. Bragin, master-adjuster of the third division of the state farm; the Order of the October Revolution — to the team leaders V. A. Vlasopulo and L. P. Lukianchenko, and the brigade leader K. D. Perekrestova. The village also hosts the Bilyaivka wine-and-juice plant and a fish processing plant. Between 1967 and 1977, 555 individual houses, six twelve-apartment buildings, and one six-apartment building were constructed in Velykyi Dalnyk.

Velykyi Dalnyk (until 1962 — Dalnyk) originated in the early 19th century. The organizer of the Dalnyk peasants in the struggle for Soviet power was a local poor man, I. Bezverkhy — a member of the peasant section of the Odessa Council of Workers' Deputies. Soviet power was established in January 1918. The first collective farm “Svitla Zoria” was organized in 1920.

During World War II, 681 residents of the village fought at the front, 324 of whom died. 357 people were awarded orders and medals of the USSR.

During the 73-day defense of Odessa (1941), an important defensive line passed through the village. The 136th Reserve Rifle Regiment and the 287th Regiment of the 25th Chapaev Rifle Division, a tank platoon under the command of Senior Lieutenant I. I. Yudin, and the 20th Cavalry Regiment fought here. Two monuments of the Belt of Glory were erected in honor of the soldiers who died in these battles.

On 21 February 2026, during a Russian night attack on the territory of the Velykodalnytska community, a strike by a Geran-type unmanned aerial vehicle was recorded. As a result of the strike, a two-storey residential dormitory was damaged. No fatalities were reported.

== Demographics ==
According to the 1989 census, the population of Velykyi Dalnyk was 7,926 people, of whom 3,689 were men and 4,237 women.

The population is 11 910 people as of 2021.

The population is 14 000 people as of 2026.

Native language as of the Ukrainian Census of 2001:

- Ukrainian 87.64%
- Russian 10.06%
- Moldovan (Romanian) 1.18%
- Bulgarian 0.37%
- Armenian 0.21%
- Belarusian 0.13%
- Romanian (self-declared) 0.05%
- German 0.03%
- Gagauz 0.01%
