= Yasky rural hromada =

Coordinates: 46°30′54″N 30°05′03″E

Yasky rural hromada Яськівська сільська громада
- Hromada
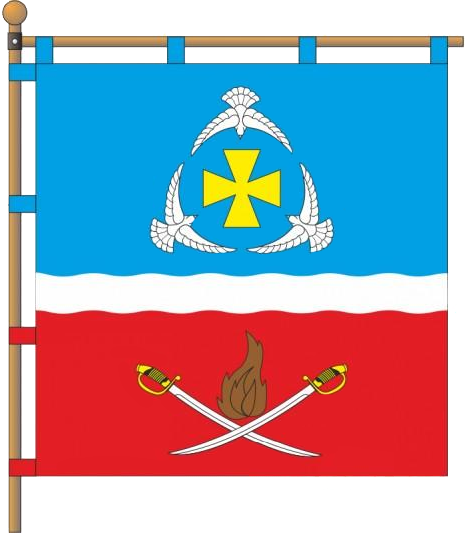
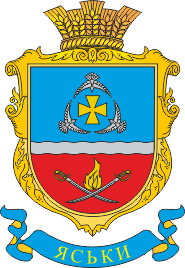
- Flag Coat of arms
- Interactive map of Yasky rural hromada
- Country: Ukraine
- Oblast: Odesa Oblast
- Raion: Odesa Raion
- Admin. center: Yasky

Area
  - Total: 225.34 km^{2} (87.00 sq mi)

Population (2020)
  - Total: 8,565
  - Density: 38.01/km^{2} (98.44/sq mi)
- CATOTTG code: UA51100430000081326
- Settlements: 2
- Villages: 2

Yasky rural hromada (Ukrainian: Яськівська сільська громада) is a hromada in Odesa Raion of Odesa Oblast in southwestern Ukraine. Population: 8,565 (2020 est.)

The hromada consists of two villages: Troitske and Yasky.

== Links ==
- Яськівська сільська ОТГ // Облікова картка на офіційному вебсайті Верховної Ради України.
- https://bl.od.court.gov.ua/userfiles/dodato.pdf
- http://gromada.info/gromada/yaskivska/
- http://atu.minregion.gov.ua/ua/ustriy_page/11769378118585741
- http://dumskaya.net/news/v-yasskovoy-otg-odesskoy-oblasti-proshli-vybory-071752/
- https://decentralization.gov.ua/gromada/1359#
