= Andrusova =

Andrusova Андрусова
- Location in Ukraine
- Coordinates: 47°18′01″N 29°52′18″E
- Country: Ukraine
- Oblast: Odesa Oblast
- Raion: Rozdilna Raion
- Hromada: Zatyshshia settlement hromada

Area
  - Total: 0.26 km^{2} (0.10 sq mi)

Population (2011)
  - Total: 68
  - Density: 260/km^{2} (680/sq mi)
- Time zone: UTC+3 (+2)
- Postal code: 66741
- Area code: +380 4860

Andrusova (Ukrainian: Андрусова) is a village in Rozdilna Raion, Odesa Oblast, Ukraine. It belongs to Zatyshshia settlement hromada, one of the hromadas of Ukraine. Population is 68.

== History ==
The territory of modern Andrusova was first settled in 1865 during the construction of the Odessa-Baltic railway. During its construction and launch, many people began to settle in the area around the railway.

== Administration ==
Until 18 July 2020, Andrusova belonged to Zakharivka Raion. The raion was abolished in July 2020 as part of the administrative reform of Ukraine, which reduced the number of raions of Odesa Oblast to seven. The area of Zakharivka Raion was merged into Rozdilna Raion.

== Demographics ==
During one of the last Soviet censuses, the 1989 Soviet census, the population of the village was recorded as 84, of which 44 were women, and 40 were men.

According to the latest official Ukrainian census, that of the 2001 Ukrainian census, the village has a total population of 68 people. The linguistic composition of the inhabitants is as follows:

Languages	2001
95.59%
4.41%
