= Velykyi Dalnyk rural hromada =

Coordinates: 46°27′N 30°23′E

Velykyi Dalnyk rural hromada Великодальницька сільська громада
- Hromada
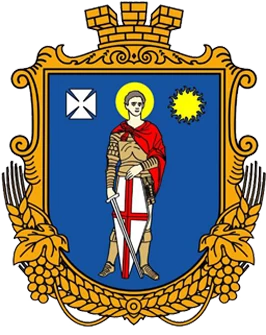
- Coat of arms
- Interactive map of Velykyi Dalnyk rural hromada
- Country: Ukraine
- Oblast: Odesa Oblast
- Raion: Odesa Raion
- Admin. center: Velykyi Dalnyk

Area
  - Total: 147.4 km^{2} (56.9 sq mi)

Population (2020)
  - Total: 12,088
  - Density: 82.01/km^{2} (212.4/sq mi)
- CATOTTG code: UA51100050000066202
- Settlements: 3
- Rural settlements: 1
- Villages: 2

Velykyi Dalnyk rural hromada (Ukrainian: Великодальницька сільська громада) is a hromada in Odesa Raion of Odesa Oblast in southwestern Ukraine. Population: 12,088 (2020 est.)

The hromada consists of one rural settlement (Rozselenets) and 2 villages: Velykyi Dalnyk (seat of administration) and Petrodolynske.
