= Marynivka, Mykolaiv Oblast =

Marynivka, Mykolaiv Oblast Маринівка
- Country: Ukraine
- Raion: Voznesensk Raion
- Oblast: Mykolaiv Oblast

Population (2001)
  - Total: 2,450
- Postal code: 56425
- Area code: 5152

Marynivka (Ukrainian: Маринівка) is a village in Domanivka Raion of Mykolaiv Oblast, Ukraine.

== Demographics ==
According to the 2001 Ukrainian Census, 2,450 people lived in the village.

== Notable people ==
- Nikolai Kirtok (1920-2022), Soviet pilot
- Maxim Grabovenko (1923-1980), Ukrainian Red Army senior sergeant

== See also ==
- Domanivka
