= Chobotarivka =

Rural locality in Odesa Oblast, Ukraine

Chobotarivka Чоботарівка
- Village
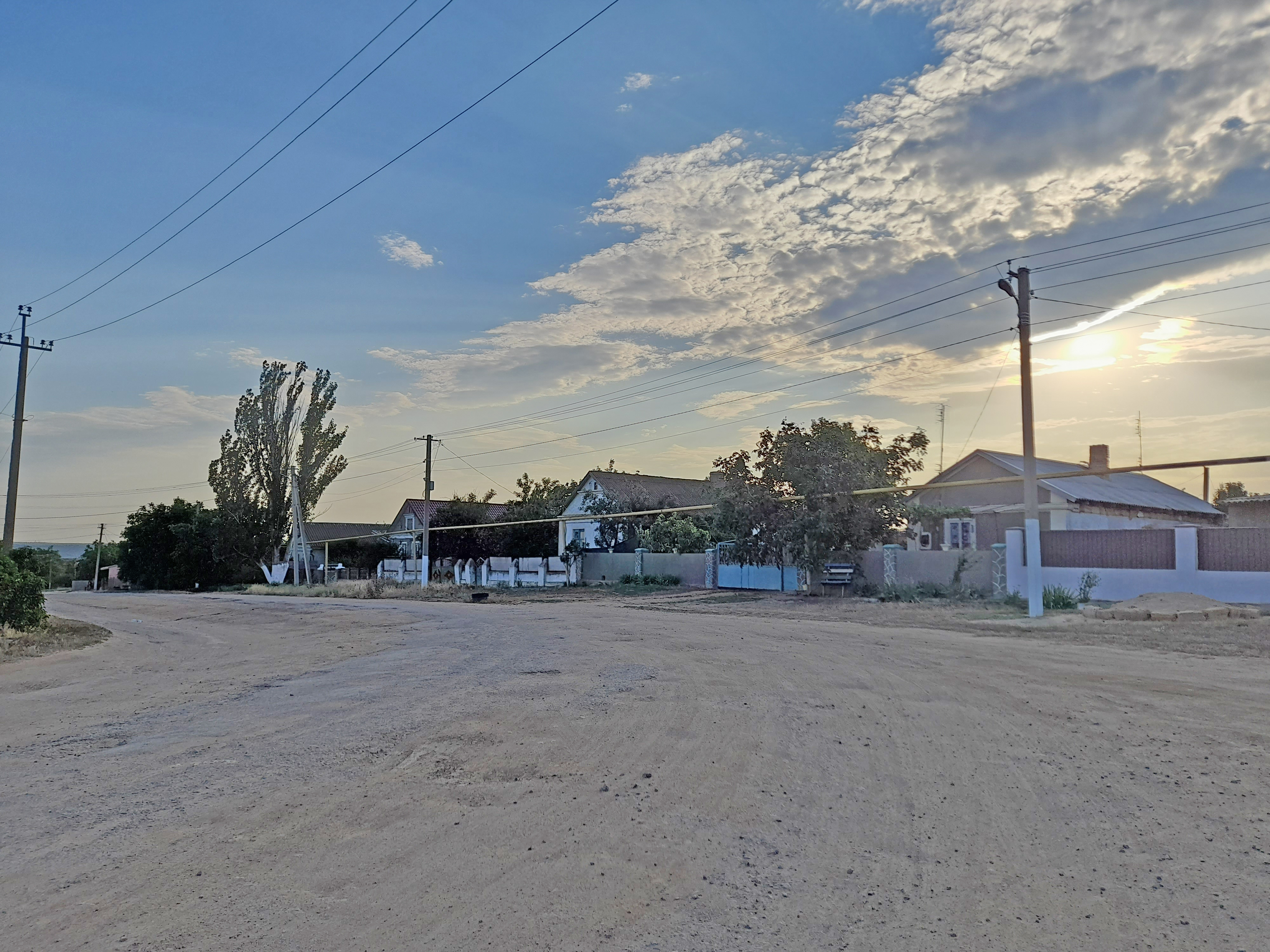
- Interactive map of Chobotarivka
- Location within Odesa Oblast Location within Ukraine
- Coordinates: 46°39′54″N 30°33′46″E
- Country: Ukraine
- Oblast: Odesa Oblast
- Raion: Odesa Raion
- Hromada: Usatove rural hromada

Area
  - Total: 1.08 km^{2} (0.42 sq mi)

Population
  - Total: 243
- Time zone: UTC+2 (EET (Kyiv))
  - Summer (DST): UTC+3 (EEST)
- Postal code: 67630

Chobotarivka (Ukrainian: Чоботарі́вка) is a village in Ukraine, Odesa Raion of Odesa Oblast. It belongs to Usatove rural hromada, one of the hromadas of Ukraine. The population is 243.

It uses the local time zone which is named Europe/Kyiv with an UTC offset of 2 hours. The closest airport in Chobotarivka is the Odesa International Airport in a distance of 17 mi (or 28 km), South.

Until 18 July 2020, Chobotarivka belonged to Biliaivka Raion. The raion was abolished in July 2020 as part of the administrative reform of Ukraine, which reduced the number of raions of Odesa Oblast to seven. The area of Biliaivka Raion was merged into Odesa Raion.

== List of places near Chobotarivka ==
This show places near Chobotarivka within a 200 km range.

Places near Chobotarivka
Place	Distance
Odesa (stone) meteorite	24.0 km (14.9 miles)
Grossliebenthal meteorite	35.0 km (21.7 miles)
Krymka meteorite	130.9 km (81.3 miles)
Gornoe Quarry	149.1 km (92.6 miles)
Kvitka prospect	153.2 km (95.2 miles)
Orhei Quarries	153.2 km (95.2 miles)
Kapustyanka prospect	154.6 km (96.1 miles)
Mighei meteorite	158.9 km (98.7 miles)
Polyanetske prospect	160.1 km (99.5 miles)
Maiskoe gold deposit	166.8 km (103.6 miles)
Savran prospect	167.6 km (104.1 miles)
Chemerpil' area	168.5 km (104.7 miles)
Zavalie graphite deposit	176.4 km (109.6 miles )
Danube Delta	121 mi (or 194 km)

== See also ==
- Danube Delta
