= Usatove =

Rural locality in Odesa Oblast, Ukraine

Usatove Усатове
- Village
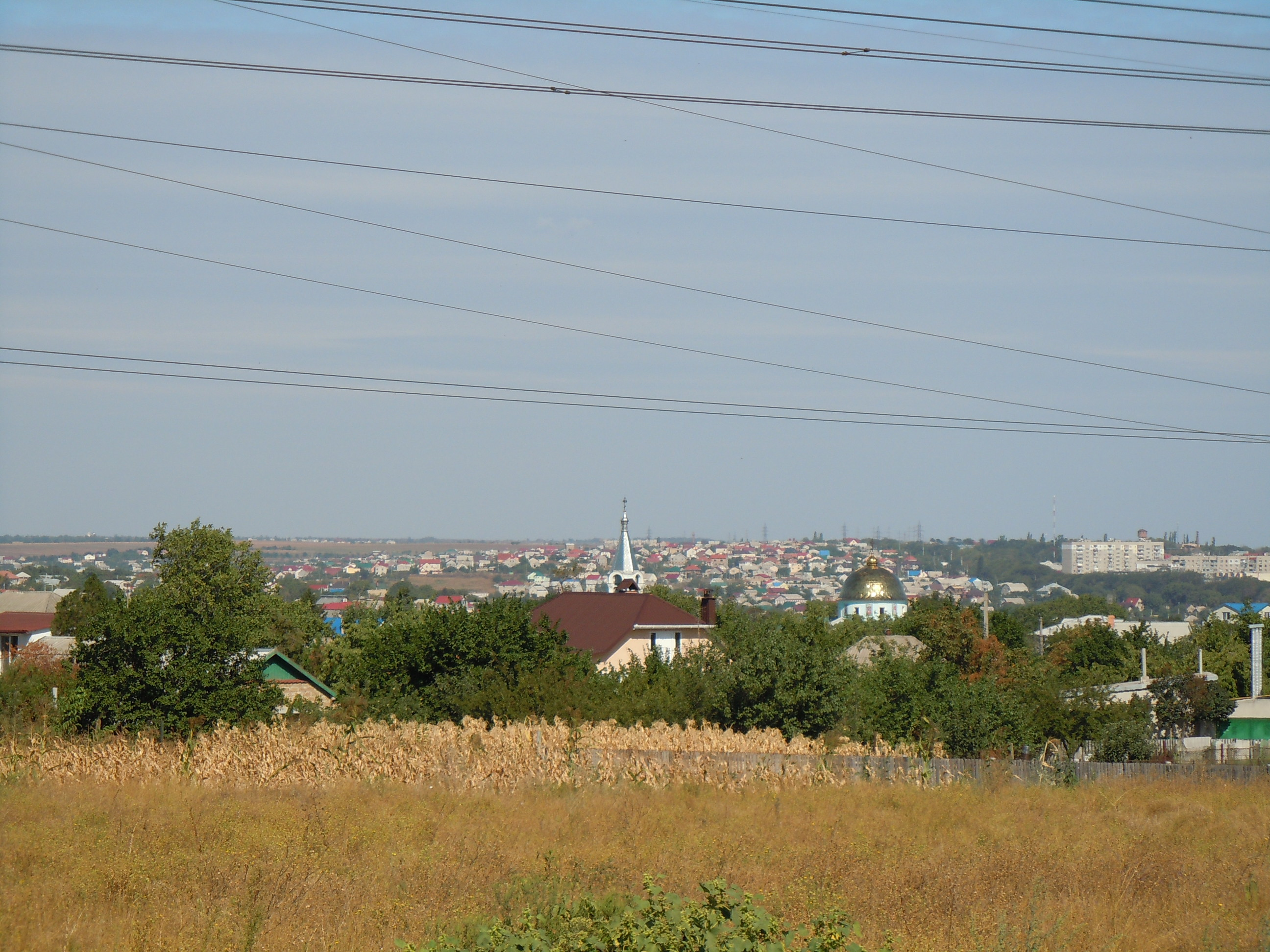
- View of the Usatove village

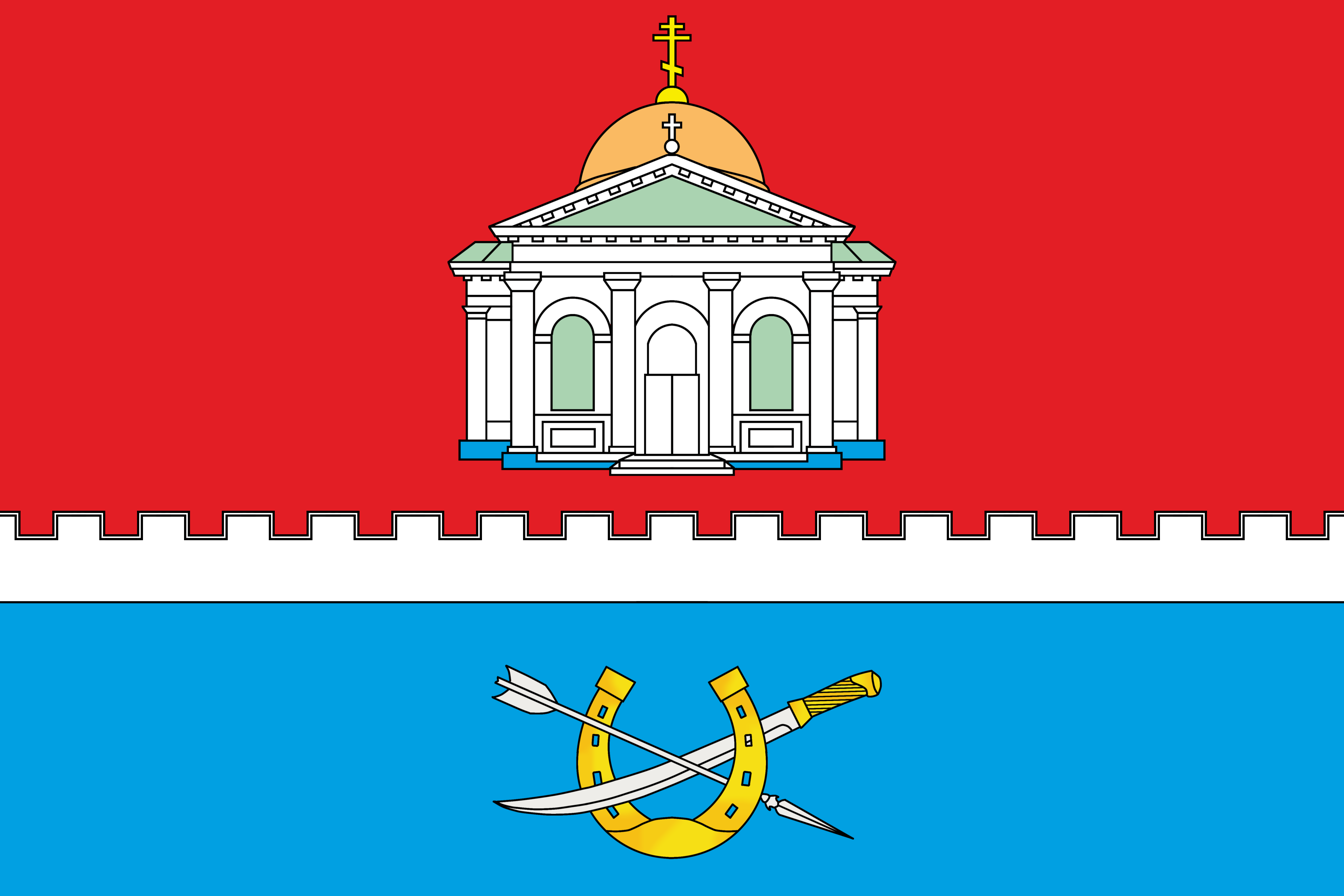
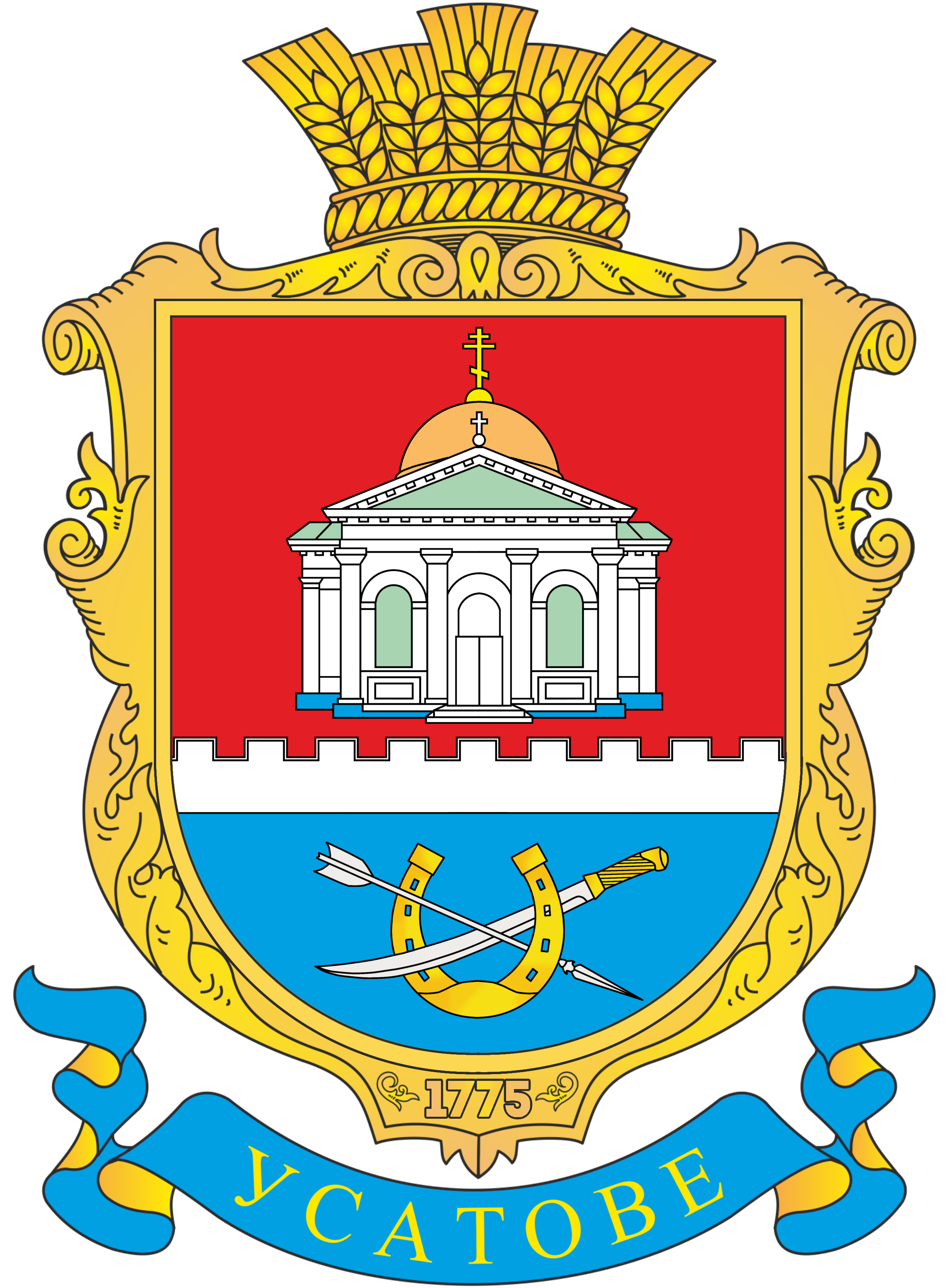
- Flag Coat of arms
- Interactive map of Usatove
- Location within Odesa Oblast Location within Ukraine
- Coordinates: 46°32′11″N 30°39′24″E
- Country: Ukraine
- Oblast: Odesa Oblast
- Raion: Odesa Raion
- Hromada: Usatove rural hromada

Area
  - Total: 4.530 km^{2} (1.749 sq mi)

Population
  - Total: 8,483
- Time zone: UTC+2 (EET (Kyiv))
  - Summer (DST): UTC+3 (EEST)
- Postal code: 67663

Usatove (Ukrainian: Усатове) is a village in Ukraine, in the Odesa Raion of Odesa Oblast. It hosts the administration of Usatove rural hromada, one of the hromadas of Ukraine. The population is 7,925 people.

Until 18 July 2020, Usatove belonged to Biliaivka Raion. The raion was abolished in July 2020 as part of the administrative reform of Ukraine, which reduced the number of raions of Odesa Oblast to seven. The area of Biliaivka Raion was merged into Odesa Raion.

== Flag ==
The flag presents three primary colors, Alizarin crimson, white, and cerulean. The non-primary colors are Rajah (Gold-ish tint at the church), summer green (A Green-Yellow Color), and Satin sheen gold. The church represented is the Church of the Nativity of the Virgin. At the bottom, it shows a shashka, and an arrow.

== Culture ==
Usatove culture (Ukrainian: Усатівська культура, romanized: Usativska kultura), is a Eneolithic (Copper Age) culture of the 4th millennium BC that existed in the North Pontic region encompassing southwestern Ukraine and northeastern Moldova along the lower Dniester River and the area near the Dniester Estuary. It takes its name from a site excavated by Mykhailo Boltenko in Odesa Oblast in 1921. While sometimes classified as a late Trypilian culture. Usatove had developed enough distinctive cultural traits to be considered a separate archeological entity. Usatove people engaged in animal husbandry, fishing, and salt gathering on the brackish Black Sea estuaries (limans). Excavations in Usatove have revealed remnants of dwellings, pottery with corded and painted ornamentation, anthropomorphic figurines, and copper and bronze weapons and adornments. Eighteen Usatove kurgans, surrounded by cromlechs, have been unearthed. The majority of Usatove sites in the Northwest Pontic are situated at estuarine transition zones. The deceased Usatove people were buried in a flexed position on their sides. Usatove elite were buried in the central chambers of kurgans, occasionally accompanied by prestige pottery of the Maykop culture from the north-eastern shore of the Black Sea. Grave goods included daggers made of bronze with arsenic overlay, pottery, and adornments such as silver jewelry. Findings of simple glass beads point to long-distance trade with the Aegean Region. Eneolithic North Pontic populations such as Trypillia C2 and Usatove in western Ukraine and Moldova might have played an important role in the origins of the northwestern Indo-European language branches. In particular, the Usatove culture might have played a significant role as the intermediary between Proto-Indo-European and the Germanic branch. The influence of the Usatovo culture extended up the Dniester, and upper-Dniester Trypillia C2 groups extended this chain of social interaction into southeastern Poland during the final centuries of the Trichterbecker or TRB culture, prior to the appearance of the Corded Ware horizon there. The Proto-Indo-European dialects that would ultimately form the root of Pre-Germanic might. It have spread up the Dniester from the Usatove culture through a nested series of patrons and clients, eventually being spoken in some of the late TRB communities between the upper Dniester and the Vistula. These late TRB communities later evolved into early Corded Ware communities, and it was the Corded Ware horizon that provided the medium through which the pre-Germanic dialects spread over a wider region.

=== Burial Customs ===
Usatove had distinctive burial/grave customs. While the crouched on the side position of the Usatove interments connects them with Eneolithic agricultural societies, the placement of burials under kurgans implies the steppe influence. A typical accessory are the stelae that are widespread in the steppe cultures.

=== Ceramics ===
Usatove pottery is represented by richly banded, high-fired Trypillia style as well as by plain unpainted pottery with cord decoration. Prestige pottery of the Maykop culture from the north-eastern shore of the Black Sea was only found in kurgan burials. In contrast, Cernavodă pottery was only found up to about 2%, and never in graves.

== Notable Places ==
- Church of the Nativity of the Virgin (Usatove)
- Church of the Intercession

== See also ==
- Odesa catacombs
