= Biliaivka Raion =

Former subdivision of Odesa Oblast, Ukraine

Biliaivka Raion Біляївський район
- Raion
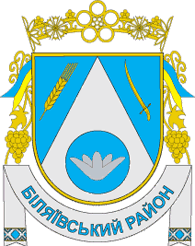
- Flag Coat of arms

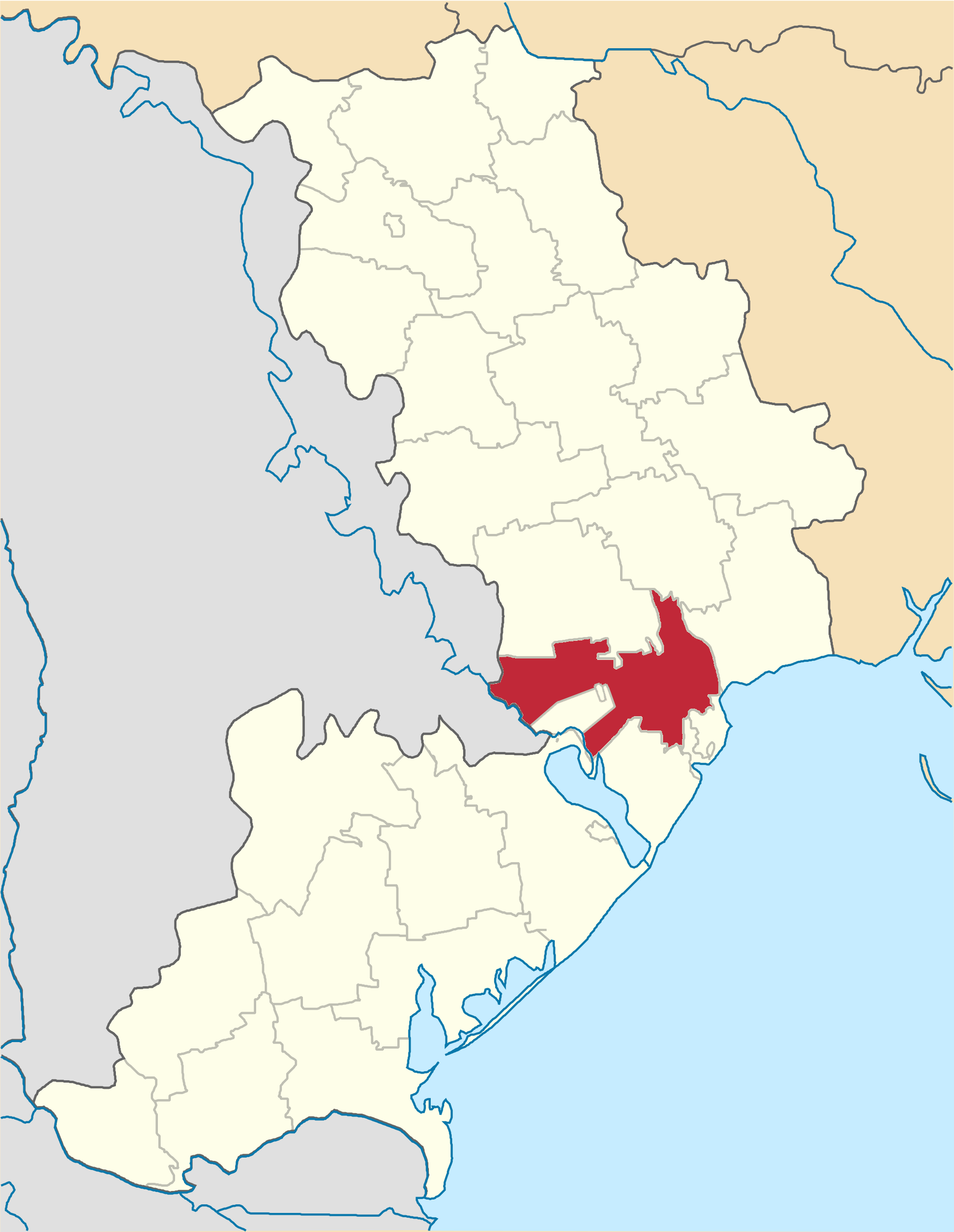
- Coordinates: 46°32′N 30°15′E
- Country: Ukraine
- Oblast: Odesa Oblast
- Established: 1923
- Disestablished: 18 July 2020
- Admin. center: Biliaivka
- Subdivisions: List: 1 — city councils; 1 — settlement councils; 20 — rural councils; Number of localities: 1 — cities; 1 — urban-type settlements; 42 — villages; 6 — rural settlements

Government
  - Governor: Arsen Zhumadilov

Area
  - Total: 1,496 km^{2} (578 sq mi)

Population (2020)
  - Total: 81,171 ▼
  - Density: 54.26/km^{2} (140.5/sq mi)
- Time zone: UTC+2 (EET)
  - Summer (DST): UTC+3 (EEST)
- Postal index: 67600—67672
- Area code: +380 4852
- Website: http://bilyaivka-rda.odessa.gov.ua/

Biliaivka Raion (Ukrainian: Біляївський район) was a raion (district) in Odesa Oblast of Ukraine. Its administrative center was the city of Biliaivka, which had a status of the city of oblast significance and did not belong to the raion. The raion was abolished and its territory was merged into Odesa Raion on 18 July 2020 as part of the administrative reform of Ukraine, which reduced the number of raions of Odesa Oblast to seven. According to the 2001 census, the majority of the population of Bileaiivka district was Ukrainian -speaking (80.26%), with Russian (16.87%) and Romanian (1.26%) speakers in the minority. The last estimate of the raion population was 81,171 (2020 est.).

Until 2016, the city of Biliaivka was part of Biliaivka Raion. On 28 January 2016, Biliaivka was designated the city of oblast significance, though it remained the center of the raion.

At the time of disestablishment, the raion consisted of seven hromadas:

- Dachne rural hromada with the administration in the selo of Dachne;
- Maiaky rural hromada with the administration in the selo of Maiaky;
- Nerubaiske rural hromada with the administration in the selo of Nerubaiske;
- Usatove rural hromada with the administration in the selo of Usatove;
- Velykyi Dalnyk rural hromada with the administration in the selo of Velykyi Dalnyk;
- Vyhoda rural hromada with the administration in the selo of Vyhoda;
- Yasky rural hromada with the administration in the selo of Yasky.
