= Odesa Raion =

Subdivision of Odesa Oblast, Ukraine

Odesa Raion Одеський район
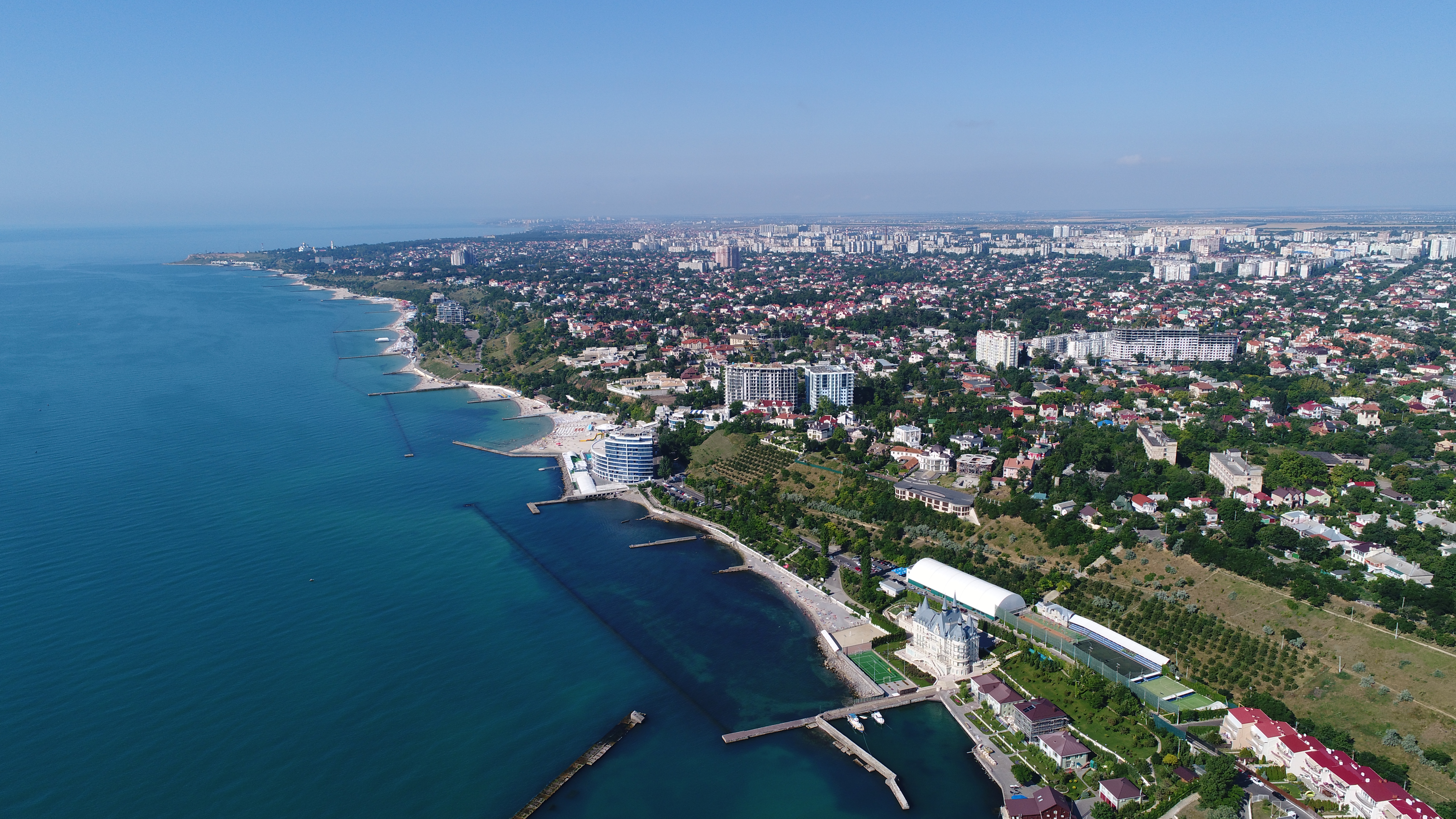

- Flag Coat of arms

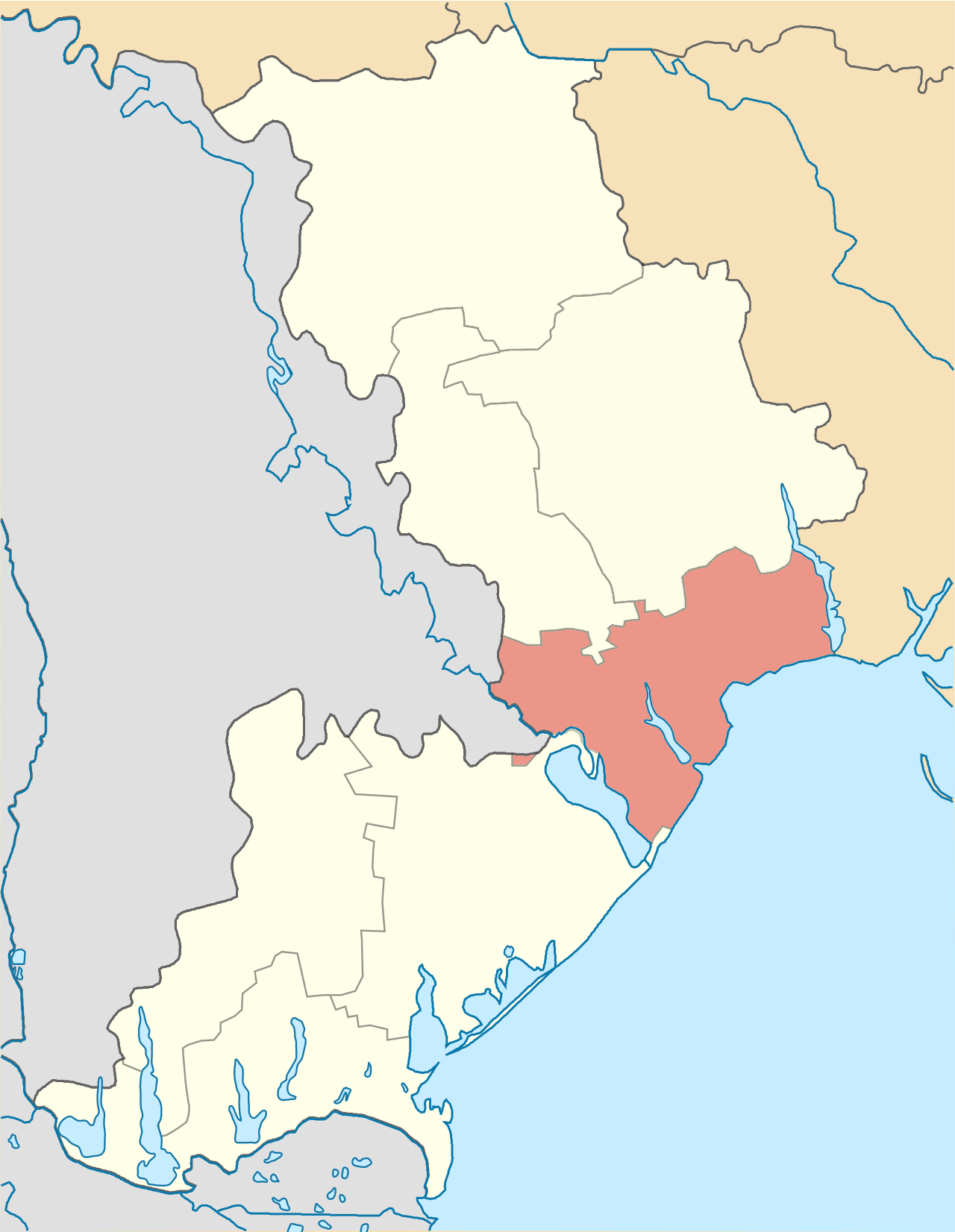
- Coordinates: 46°30′N 30°27′E
- Country: Ukraine
- Oblast: Odesa Oblast
- Established: 2020
- Subdivisions: 22 hromadas

Area
  - Total: 3,655.66 km^{2} (1,411.46 sq mi)

Population (2022)
  - Total: 1,378,490
  - Density: 377.084/km^{2} (976.642/sq mi)
- Website: odrda.od.gov.ua

Odesa Raion (Ukrainian: Одеський район) or Odessa Raion (Russian: Одесский район) is a raion (district) of Odesa Oblast, Ukraine. It was created on 17 July 2020 as part of the reform of administrative divisions of Ukraine. Biliaivka Raion, Biliaivka and Illichivsk municipalities, parts of Lyman and Ovidiopol raions, as well as the cities of Odesa, Teplodar, and Yuzhne were merged into Odesa Raion. The center of the raion is the city of Odesa. Population: 1,378,490 (2022 estimate).

== Administrative division ==
At the time of establishment, the raion consisted of 22 hromadas:

- Avanhard settlement hromada with the administration in the rural settlement of Avanhard, transferred from Ovidiopol Raion;
- Biliaivka urban hromada with the administration in the city of Biliaivka, transferred from Biliaivka Municipality;
- Chornomorsk urban hromada with the administration in the city of Chornomorsk, transferred from Illichivsk Municipality;
- Chornomorske settlement hromada with the administration in the rural settlement of Chornomorske, transferred from Lyman Raion;
- Dalnyk rural hromada with the administration in the village of Dalnyk, transferred from Ovidiopol Raion;
- Dachne rural hromada with the administration in the village of Dachne, transferred from Biliaivka Raion;
- Dobroslav settlement hromada with the administration in the rural settlement of Dobroslav, transferred from Lyman Raion;
- Fontanka rural hromada with the administration in the village of Fontanka, transferred from Lyman Raion;
- Krasnosilka rural hromada with the administration in the village of Krasnosilka, transferred from Lyman Raion;
- Maiaky rural hromada with the administration in the village of Maiaky, transferred from Biliaivka Raion;
- Nerubaiske rural hromada with the administration in the village of Nerubaiske, transferred from Biliaivka Raion;
- Odesa urban hromada with the administration in the city of Odesa, transferred from the city of oblast significance of Odesa;
- Ovidiopol settlement hromada with the administration in the rural settlement of Ovidiopol, transferred from Ovidiopol Raion;
- Tairove settlement hromada with the administration in the rural settlement of Tairove, transferred from Ovidiopol Raion;
- Teplodar urban hromada with the administration in the city of Teplodar, transferred from the city of oblast significance of Teplodar;
- Usatove rural hromada with the administration in the village of Usatove, transferred from Biliaivka Raion;
- Velykodolynske settlement hromada with the administration in the rural settlement of Velykodolynske, transferred from Ovidiopol Raion;
- Velykyi Dalnyk rural hromada with the administration in the village of Velykyi Dalnyk, transferred from Biliaivka Raion;
- Vyhoda rural hromada with the administration in the village of Vyhoda, transferred from Biliaivka Raion;
- Vyzyrka rural hromada with the administration in the village of Vyzyrka, transferred from Lyman Raion;
- Yasky rural hromada with the administration in the village of Yasky, transferred from Biliaivka Raion;
- Yuzhne urban hromada with the administration in the city of Pivdenne, transferred from Lyman Raion and the city of oblast significance of Yuzhne.

== Geography ==
Odessa district is located in the center of Odesa Oblast. The district borders on Mykolaiv Oblast of Ukraine and on Moldova. The district has access to the Black Sea. The territory of the district is part of the Black Sea lowland. The surface is a plain, dissected by ravines and gullies.

The climate of the district is temperate continental with dry periods, but there is a softening of the climate due to the proximity to the Black Sea. According to the Köppen-Geiger climate classification, the climate of the Odesa Raion is humid continental with hot summers (Dfa).

Within the district there are the Dniester, Khadzhibey and Tyligul estuaries.

The area grows vegetables, grapes, and has developed livestock and poultry farming.

The largest city in the region, Odesa, is a sea trading port, cultural, tourist, trade, and transport center of Ukraine. Railway and road routes have been laid to Odessa from Kyiv, Lviv, and Dnipro. Highways E95 and E58 pass through the region.
