= Biliaivka urban hromada =

Coordinates: 46°28′57.9″N 30°12′05″E

Biliaivka urban hromada Біляївська міська громада
- Hromada
- Flag Coat of arms
- Interactive map of Biliaivka urban hromada
- Country: Ukraine
- Oblast: Odesa Oblast
- Raion: Odesa Raion
- Admin. center: Biliaivka

Area
  - Total: 396.4 km^{2} (153.1 sq mi)

Population (2020)
  - Total: 22,712
  - Density: 57.30/km^{2} (148.4/sq mi)
- CATOTTG code: UA51100030000027628
- Settlements: 7
- Cities: 1
- Villages: 6
- Website: bilyaivka.od.gov.ua

Biliaivka urban hromada (Ukrainian: Біляївська міська громада) is a hromada (municipality) in Odesa Raion of Odesa Oblast in southwestern Ukraine. Population: 22,712 (2020 est.)

The hromada consists of a city of Biliaivka and 6 villages:

- Hradenytsi
- Kaharlyk, Odesa Oblast
- Maiory
- Myrne, Odesa Raion, Odesa Oblast
- Povstanske
- Shyroka Balka

== Geography ==
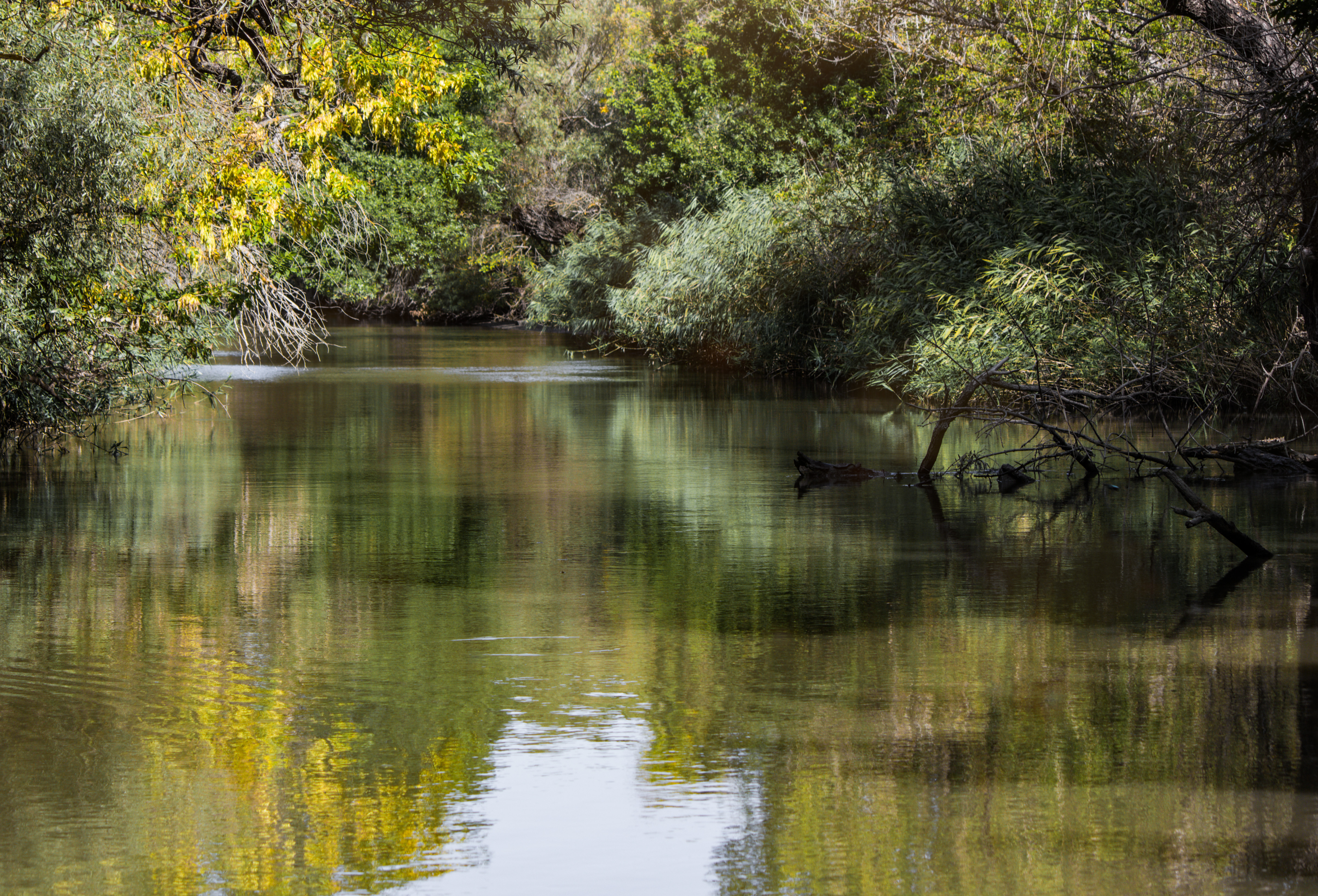
Turunchuk in Biliaivka Hromada

The total area of the municipality is 396.4 km^{2}. The following water bodies are located on the territory of the hromada: rivers Baraboi, Turunchuk, lakes Bile, Pohorile, Safiany, also reservoirs Baraboi and Cuciurgan.

== Links ==
- Biliaivka urban hromada // Облікова картка на офіційному вебсайті Верховної Ради України.
- Біляївська міська ОТГ // Облікова картка на офіційному вебсайті Верховної Ради України.
- Децентралізація: Біляївська територіальна громада (Нові громади)
- Децентралізація: Біляївська об'єднана територіальна громада
- http://gromada.info/gromada/bilyaivska/
- Одеська обласна рада своїм рішенням створила сім об'єднаних територіальних громад
- http://atu.minregion.gov.ua/ua/ustriy_page/9346875923570435
