= Cuciurgan =

Cuciurgan may refer to:

- Cuciurgan power station, a power station located in Dnestrovsc, Moldova
- Cuciurgan Reservoir, a water reservoir located on the border between Moldova and Ukraine
- Kuchurhan (river) (Romanian: Cuciurgan), a river which forms part of the border between Moldova and Ukraine
- Kuchurhan, Lymanske settlement hromada, Rozdilna Raion, Odesa Oblast (Romanian: Cuciurgan), a village
- Kuchurhan, Velyka Mykhailivka settlement hromada, Rozdilna Raion, Odesa Oblast (Romanian: Cuciurgan), a village

== See also ==
- Kuchurhan (disambiguation)
