= Kuchurhan =

Kuchurhan (Ukrainian: Кучурган) may refer to the following places in Ukraine:

- Kuchurhan, Lymanske settlement hromada, Rozdilna Raion, Odesa Oblast, a village
- Kuchurhan, Velyka Mykhailivka settlement hromada, Rozdilna Raion, Odesa Oblast, a village
- Kuchurhan (river), a river in Eastern Europe
- Cuciurgan Reservoir, a water reservoir located on the border between Moldova and Ukraine, known in Ukraine as the Kuchurhan Reservoir

== See also ==
- Cuciurgan (disambiguation)
