= Lymanske, Rozdilna Raion, Odesa Oblast =

Rural settlement in Odesa Oblast, Ukraine

Lymanske Лиманське
- Rural settlement
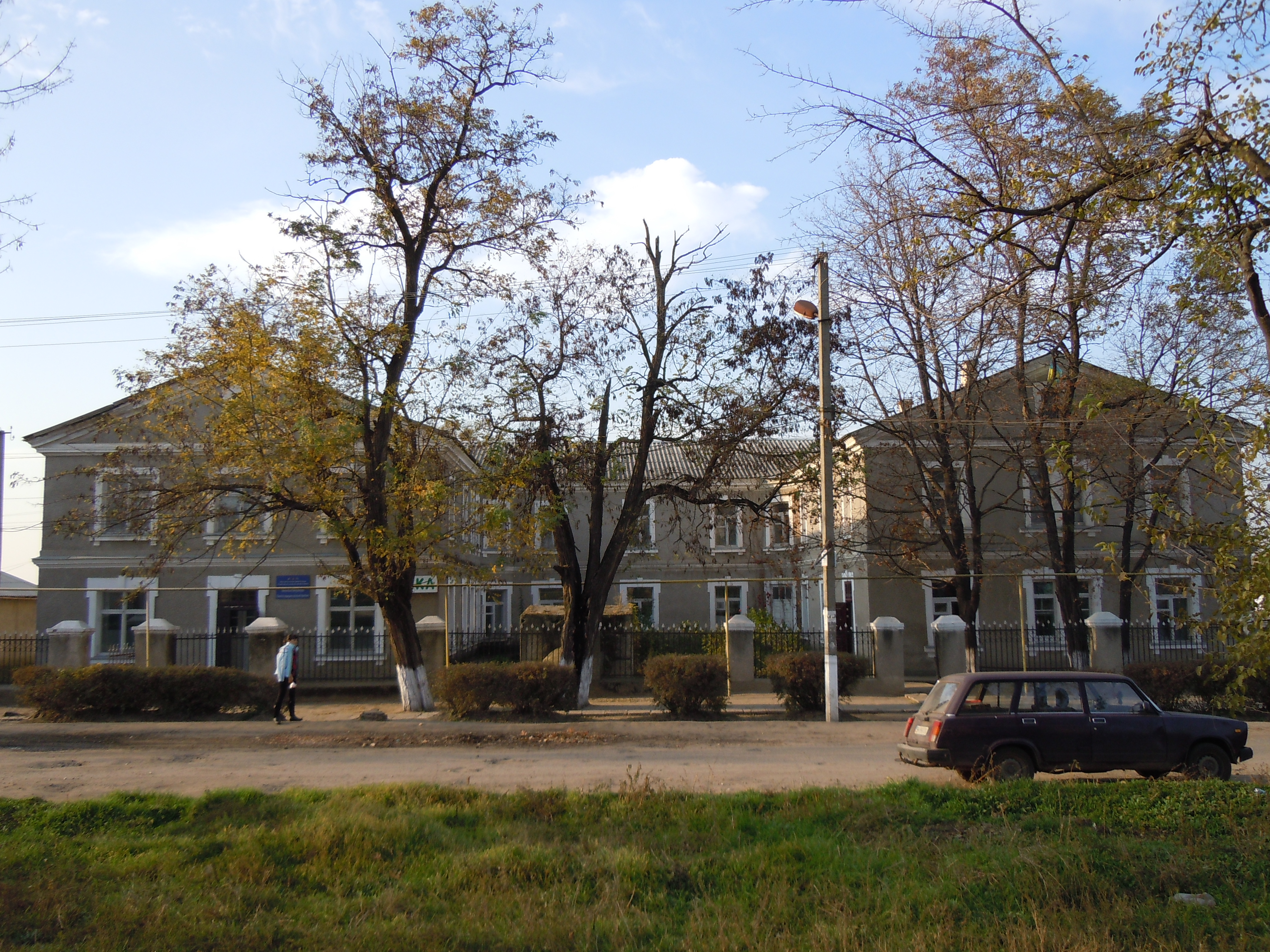

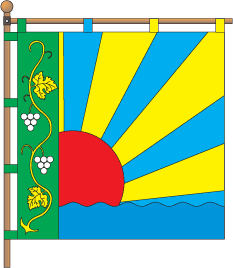
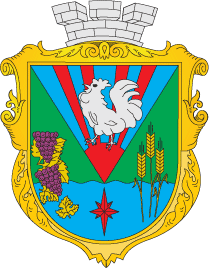
- Flag Coat of arms

- Location in Ukraine Lymanske (Ukraine)
- Coordinates: 46°39′50″N 29°58′15″E
- Country: Ukraine
- Oblast: Odesa Oblast
- Raion: Rozdilna Raion
- Hromada: Lymanske settlement hromada
- Founded: 1798

Area
  - Total: 5.05 km^{2} (1.95 sq mi)

Population (2022)
  - Total: 7,119
  - Density: 1,410/km^{2} (3,650/sq mi)
- Time zone: UTC+2 (CET)
  - Summer (DST): UTC+3 (CEST)
- Postal code: 67452, 67453
- Area code: +380 4853
- Former name: Selz, Kandel (1808—1944)
- Website: limanskoe.od.ua

Lymanske (Ukrainian: Лиманське; German: Selz) is a rural settlement in Rozdilna Raion, Odesa Oblast, Ukraine. It belongs to Lymanske settlement hromada, one of the hromadas of Ukraine. Lymanske is located along the east side of the Kuchurhan Reservoir on the border with Transnistria in Moldova. Population: 7,119 (2022 estimate).

The villages of Selz (named after Seltz in Alsace) and Kandel were established at this location along the Kuchurhan River in 1808 by Roman Catholic German and Alsatian (French citizens) immigrants to the Kutschurhan Valley, then part of the Russian Empire. It received its present name after the remaining German residents were driven from the area by the advancing Soviet army in 1944.

== History ==
Lymanske, as well as many of the surrounding settlements, originally began as a German agricultural colony. Germans began settling in southern Ukraine and the Crimean Peninsula in the late 18th century, but the bulk of immigration and settlement occurred during the Napoleonic period, from 1800 onward, with a concentration in the years 1803 to 1805.

=== 1900 – 1944 ===
The Russian Civil War of 1919 hit the Selz people especially hard when during early August the farmers attempted a three-day stand against General Grigori Kotovski’s Bolshevist cavalry regiment and lost. The Bolsheviks massacred 111 men and women of Selz. During Stalin's Great Terror of 1937-1938 the population was reduced by 15 percent. This great loss caused the government to keep the results of a 1939 census secret.

During early August of 1941 the German air force staged air attacks on Selz, Kandel and Baden and two people died. Bombs destroyed homes and stables. In two villages livestock also were killed in the air attacks. The residents hid in cellars and camps for several days, until Sunday, August 10 when Romanian soldiers marched first into Kandel, then into the other villages, and declared their sovereign rule over the settlements. They were followed immediately by an SS-unit arriving on foot. Within two weeks, the SS identified all leaders of the collectives, leaders of village councils, village activists, as well as children from mixed German-Jewish families and executed them in secret.

From 1942 on the villages came under political administration by Police Commissariat 23. The villagers restored their churches as much as possible, and religious services held by Catholic military clergy from Romania were permitted only under military supervision. Once again, the language of commerce was German, and school instruction was conducted with the help of textbooks imported from Germany. A March 12, 1944 announcement ordered the population to prepare for “administrative resettlement.” The people of Kandel, initially heading toward Franzfeld, were the first to leave. The Selz people's turn came only six days later. Because the authorities had abandoned the Selz residents, they wandered around for days until some men discovered a ferry near Mayaki. After two thirds of the people and wagons had reached the western side successfully, a Soviet artillery grenade hit the ferry and sank people and horses. 76 other wagons and 450 Selz residents were captured and sentenced to life in labor camps, while the women and children were deported to the northern Urals. The formerly unified village communities of the Selz colonist district thus ceased to exist. It was the end of their 136-year history.

=== Independent Ukraine ===
Until 26 January 2024, Lymanske was designated urban-type settlement. On this day, a new law entered into force which abolished this status, and Lymanske became a rural settlement.

== Notable people ==
- Valentin Edward Hoffinger (1901 – 1976) a professional ice hockey player.

== See also ==
- Flight and evacuation of German civilians during the end of World War II
- Black Sea Germans
- Bessarabia Germans
- Selz, North Dakota
