= Oleg Dovgopol =

Transnistrian politician

- Олег Довгопол
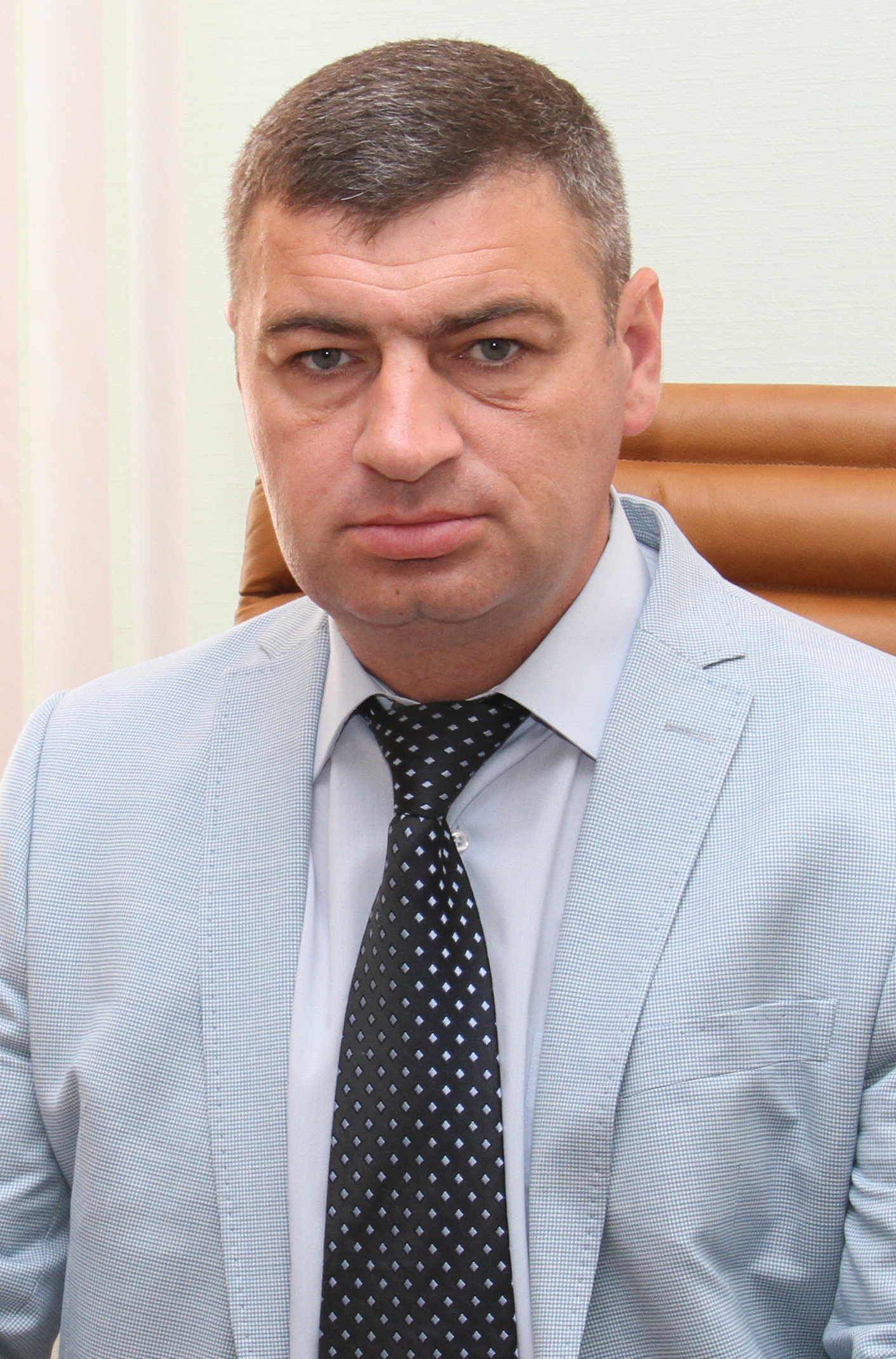
- Dovgopol in 2017

Head of the State Administration of Tiraspol and of Dnestrovsk
- In office 23 December 2016 – 20 November 2024
- Preceded by: Sergey Danilyuk
- Succeeded by: Ilona Tyuryaeva

Personal details
- Born: 14 October 1975 (age 51) Bershad, Ukrainian SSR, Soviet Union
- Education: Shevchenko Transnistria State University

Oleg Anatolievich Dovgopol (Russian: Олег Анатолиевич Довгопол; born 14 October 1975) is a Transnistrian politician serving as the mayor of Tiraspol and Dnestrovsc from 2016 until 2024.

== Biography ==
Dovgopol was born on 14 October 1975 in Bershad, Ukrainian SSR, USSR and moved to Tiraspol with his family in 1979. He graduated from the Faculty of Law of the Shevchenko Transnistria State University.

Since 1997 he served in the state security bodies of the Pridnestrovian Moldavian Republic. In 2005, he was elected a deputy of the Tiraspol City Council of People's Deputies. From 2006 to 2016 he worked as director of Centr-Market OOO.

From 23 December 2016 till 20 November 2024 he has been serving as the mayor of Tiraspol and Dnestrovsc.
