= Lake Pohorile =

Lake in Ukraine

Pohorile
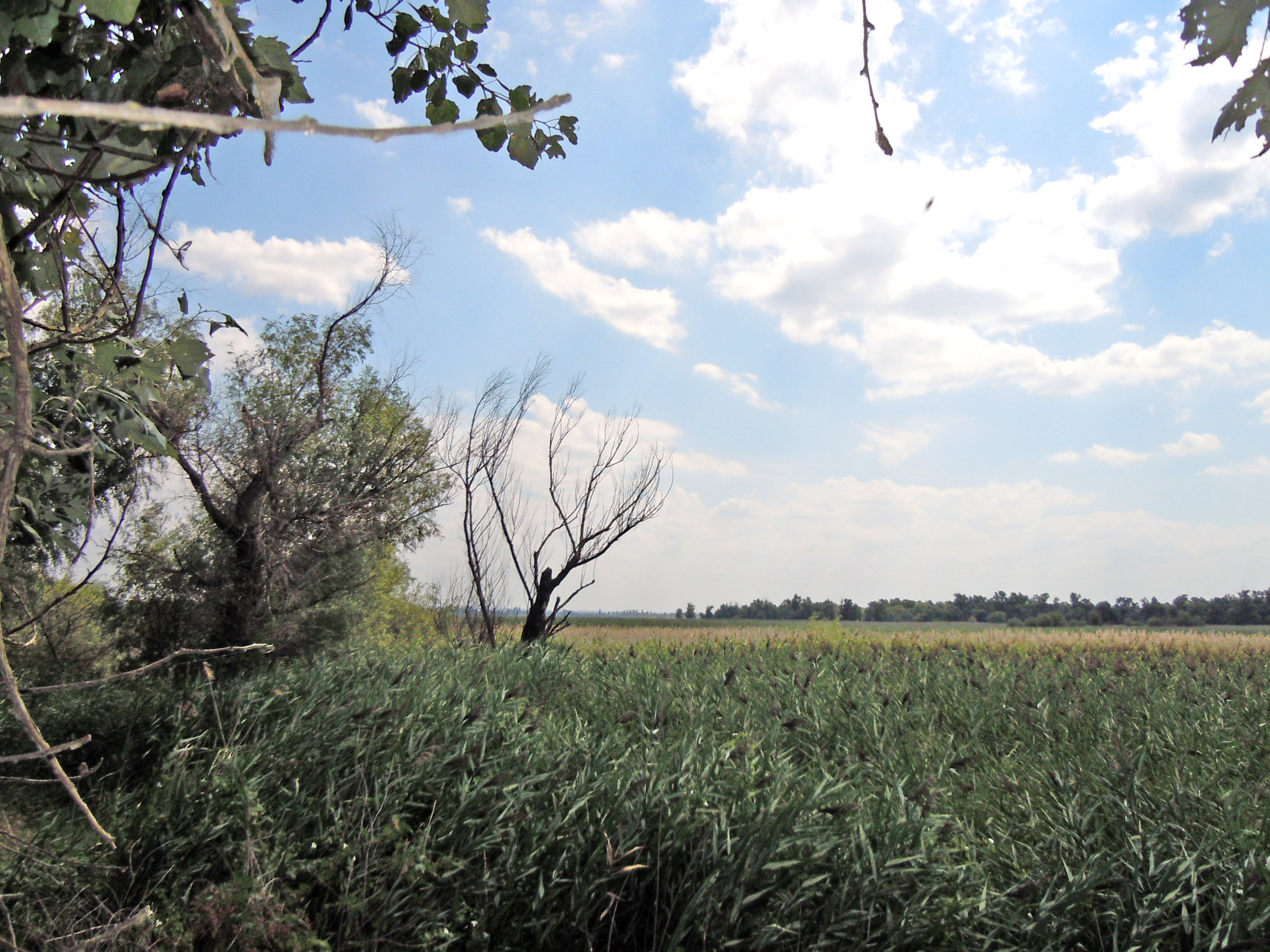
- The view of the lake from the city of Biliaivka

- Location within Odesa Oblast
- Location: Odesa Oblast
- Coordinates: 46°27′53.2″N 30°12′24.1″E
- Basin countries: Ukraine

Lake Pohorile (Ukrainian: озеро Погоріле, lit. 'burnt lake') is a lake in south-western Ukraine, in the delta of the Dniester River. It is located south of the city of Biliaivka. The lake is characterized by low flow. The water source of the waterbody gets from several small canals, which connects the lake with the Turunchuk River. The lake is the place of spawning for numerous species of phytophylous fish. The oxygen content of the lake waters is 96.4-96.5%, with a concentration of 9.6-11.5 mg/L. The water salinity is 1.0-1.2‰, pH — 8.3-8.7.

== Sources ==
- Трансграничное сотрудничество и устойчивое управление в бассейне р. Днестр: Фаза III — реализация Программы действий» («Днестр-III») / КОМПЛЕКСНЫЕ МОЛДО-УКРАИНСКИЕ ИССЛЕДОВАНИЯ ИХТИОФАУНЫ ВОДОЕМОВ БАССЕЙНА НИЖНЕГО ДНЕСТРА — / Тромбицкий И. Д., Бушуев С. Г. — ОБСЕ/ ЕЭК ООН/ ЮНЕП, 2011.
