= Ilona Tyuryaeva =

Transnistrian politician (born 1968)

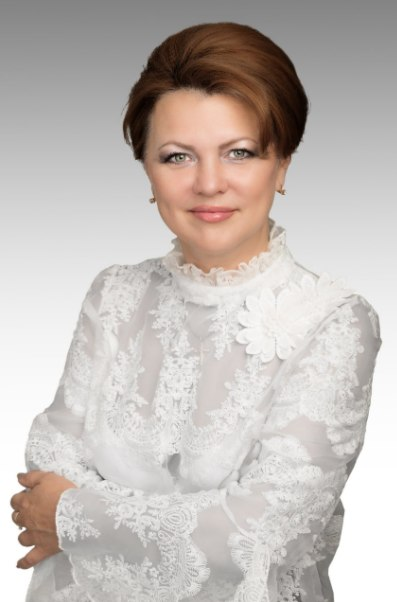

Head of the State Administration of Tiraspol and of Dnestrovsk
- Incumbent
- Assumed office 20 November 2024
- Preceded by: Oleg Dovgopol

Personal details
- Born: Ilona Petrovna Tyuryaeva; 15 August 1968 (age 58) Tiraspol, Moldavian SSR

Ilona Petrovna Tyuryaeva (born 15 August 1968) is a Transnistrian politician who was first elected to the self-proclaimed state's Supreme Council in 2005.

== Early life ==
Born on 15 August 1968 in Tiraspol, she hails from a family of doctors and military seamen. She attended Tiraspol Secondary School No. 2 and then worked as a teacher. In 1985, she began studying at the Kishinev Pedagogical Institute.

== Career ==
In 1993, Tyuryaeva joined the Transnistrian police, eventually becoming a captain, and in 1995 became head of the personnel department at the School of Internal Affairs, part of Transnistria's Ministry of Internal Affairs. In 1999, she began working for Sheriff as the head of personnel and became the company's Deputy Director for Human Resources and Social Issues two years later.

In 2005, Tyuryaeva was elected a deputy on the Tiraspol City Council for the electoral district no. 22. Later that year, she was elected to Transnistria's Supreme Council as part of its Fourth Convocation, and was reelected in 2010 and 2015.
