= Lake Safiany =

Lake in Ukraine

Safiany
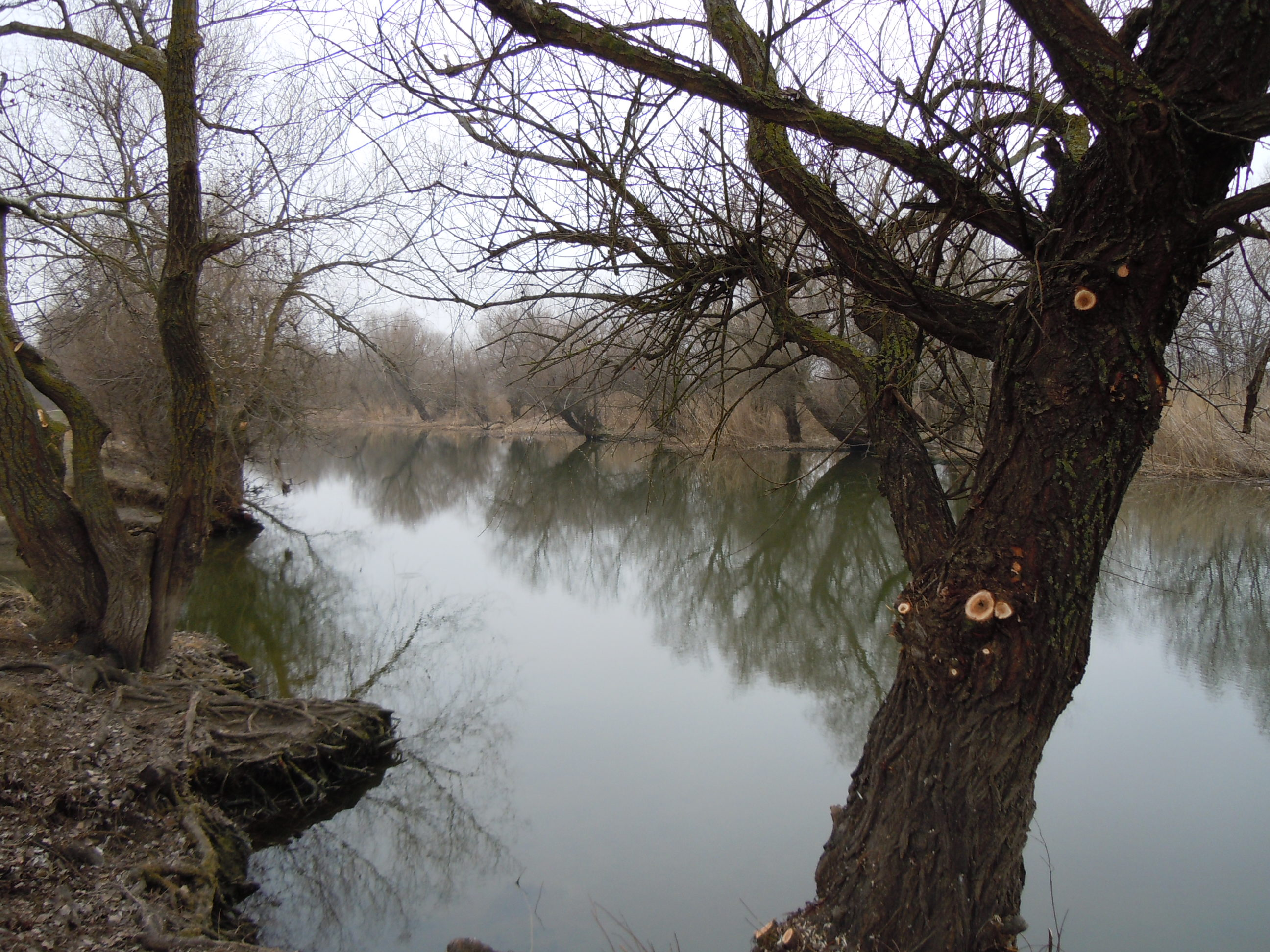
- The canal to Safiany Lake, Biliaivka

- Location within Odesa Oblast
- Interactive map of Safiany
- Location: Odesa Oblast
- Coordinates: 46°28′25.1″N 30°11′22.2″E
- Primary inflows: Turunchuk River
- Primary outflows: Turunchuk River
- Basin countries: Ukraine

Safiany (Ukrainian: Саф'яни) is a lake in the south-western Ukraine, in the delta of the Dniester River. It is located near the city of Biliaivka.

== Sources ==
- Трансграничное сотрудничество и устойчивое управление в бассейне р. Днестр: Фаза III — реализация Программы действий» («Днестр-III») / КОМПЛЕКСНЫЕ МОЛДО-УКРАИНСКИЕ ИССЛЕДОВАНИЯ ИХТИОФАУНЫ ВОДОЕМОВ БАССЕЙНА НИЖНЕГО ДНЕСТРА — / Тромбицкий И. Д., Бушуев С. Г. — ОБСЕ/ ЕЭК ООН/ ЮНЕП, 2011.
