= Shyroka Balka, Odesa Oblast =

Rural locality in Odesa Oblast, Ukraine

Shyroka Balka Широка Балка Shyroka Balka, Kostiantynivka, Karlo-Davydova, Karlsthal
- Village
- Shyroka Balka
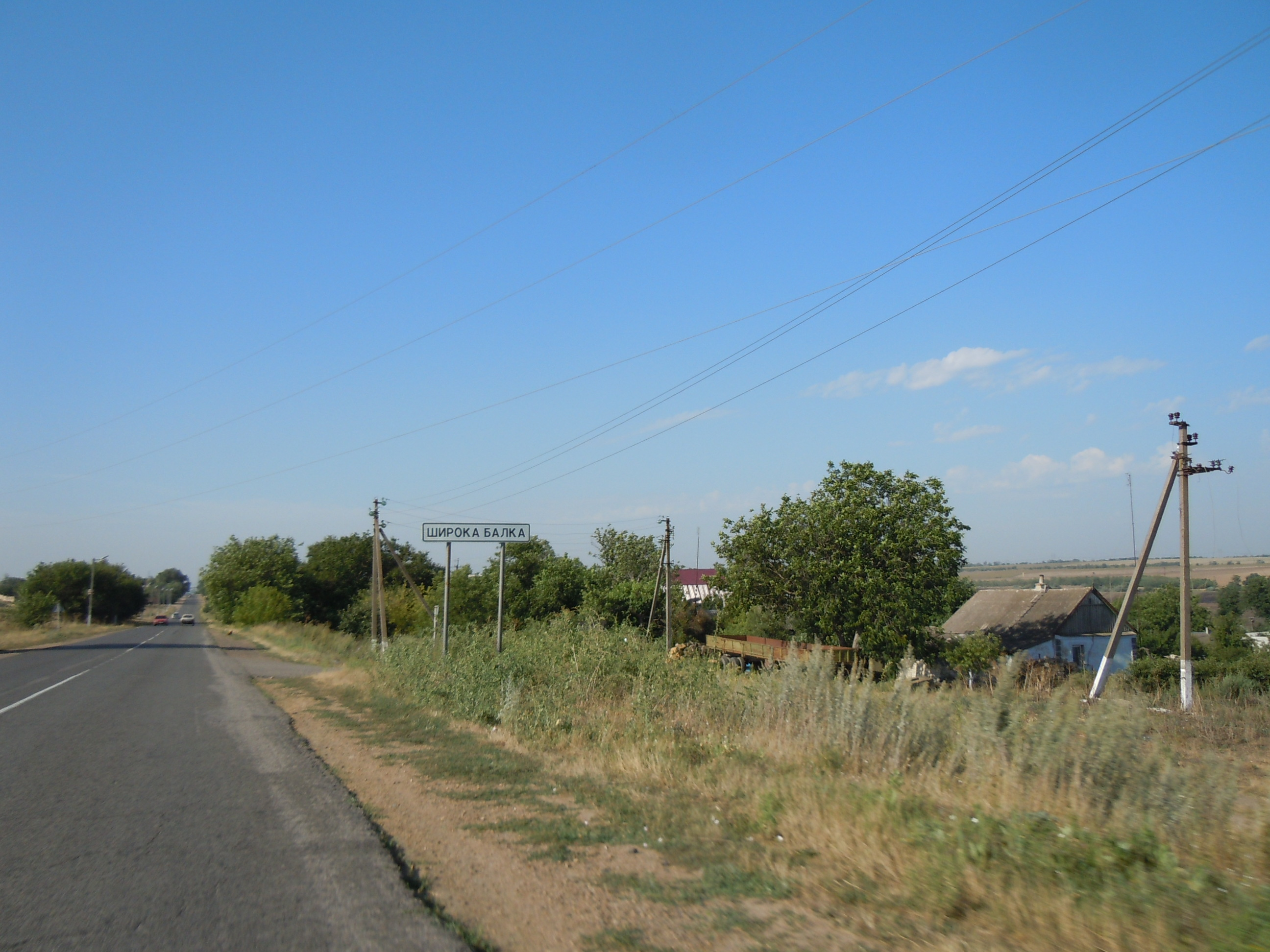
- Central street of the village
- Interactive map of Shyroka Balka
- Location within Odesa Oblast Location within Ukraine
- Coordinates: 46.534167°N 30.356111°E
- Country: Ukraine
- Oblast: Odesa Oblast
- Raion: Odesa Raion
- Hromada: Biliaivka urban hromada
- Date Established: 1805

Area
  - Total: 0.7 km^{2} (0.27 sq mi)
- Elevation: 62 m (203 ft)

Population (2001 census)
  - Total: 728
  - Density: 1,000/km^{2} (2,700/sq mi)
- Time zone: UTC+2 (EET (Kyiv))
  - Summer (DST): UTC+3 (EEST)
- Postal code: 67653
- Area code: +380 4852

Shyroka Balka (Ukrainian: Широка Балка) is a village in Odesa Raion (district) in Odesa Oblast of southern Ukraine. It belongs to Biliaivka urban hromada, one of the hromadas of Ukraine.

Until 18 July 2020, Shyroka Balka belonged to Biliaivka Raion. The raion was abolished in July 2020 as part of the administrative reform of Ukraine, which reduced the number of raions of Odesa Oblast to seven. The area of Biliaivka Raion was merged into Odesa Raion.
