= Kuchurhan, Lymanske settlement hromada, Rozdilna Raion, Odesa Oblast =

Rural locality in Odesa Oblast, Ukraine

Kuchurhan Кучурган
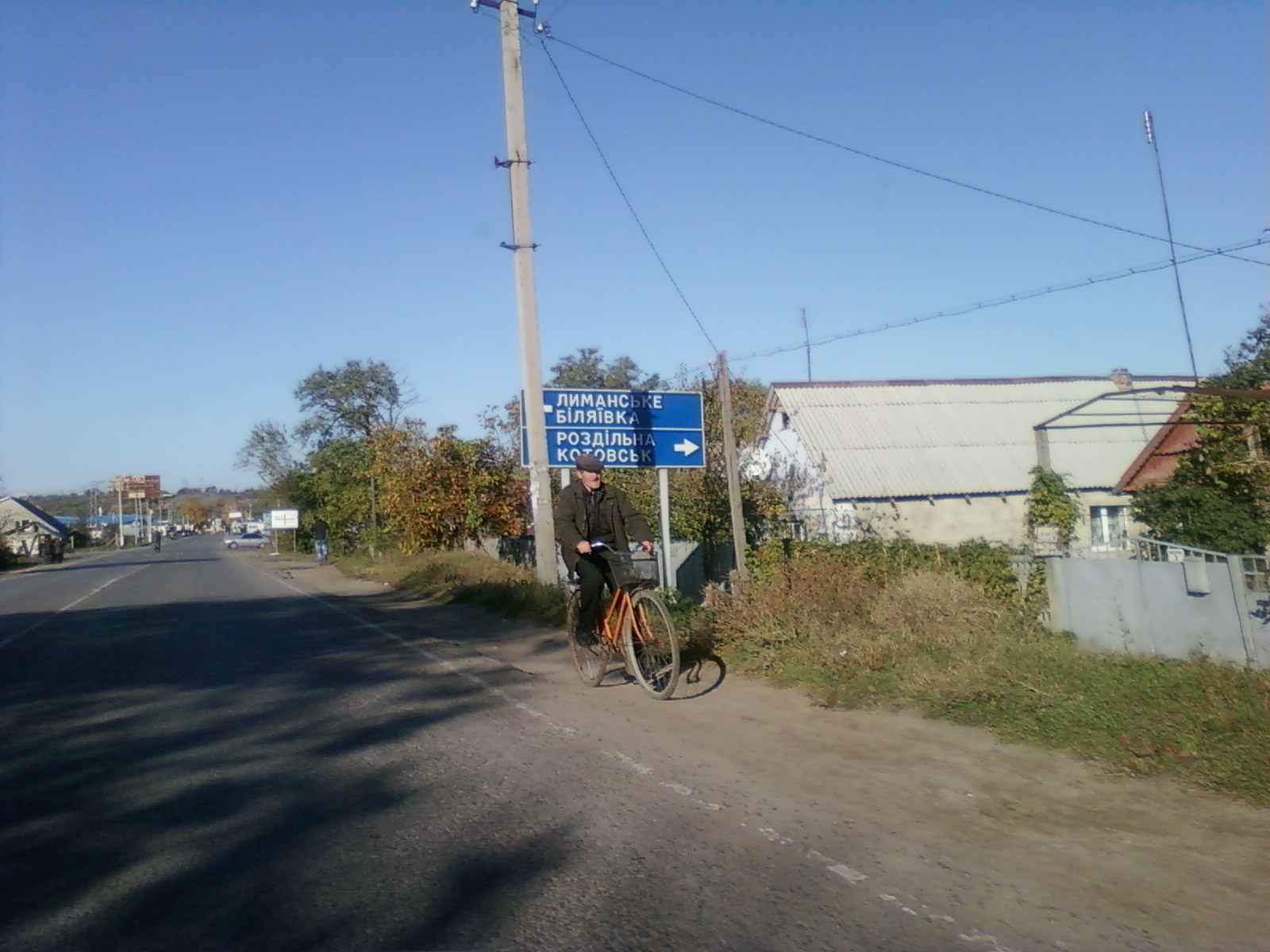
- Central street of the village

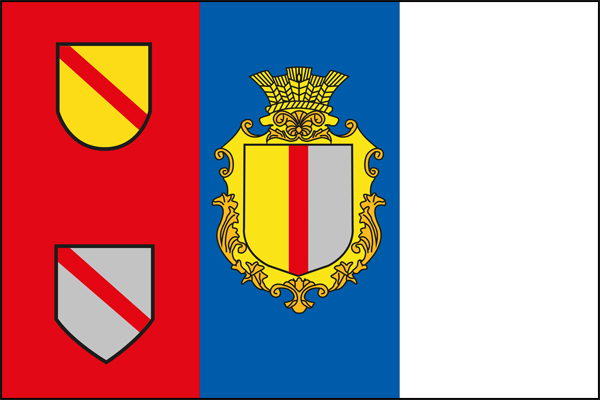
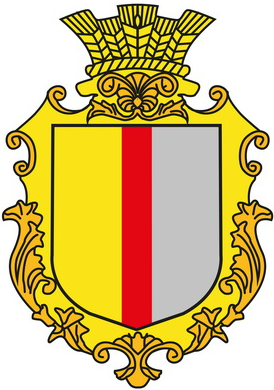
- Flag Coat of arms
- Interactive map of Kuchurhan
- Location in Ukraine Kuchurhan (Ukraine)
- Coordinates: 46°43′25″N 29°58′39″E
- Country: Ukraine
- Oblast: Odesa Oblast
- Raion: Rozdilna Raion
- Hromada: Lymanske settlement hromada
- Founded: 1808

Area
  - Total: 3.42 km^{2} (1.32 sq mi)

Population (2019)
  - Total: 3,700
  - Density: 1,100/km^{2} (2,800/sq mi)
- Time zone: UTC+3 (+2)
- Postal code: 67450
- Area code: +380 4853
- Former name: Strassburg, Baden (1808—1944)

Kuchurhan (Ukrainian: Кучурган; Romanian: Cuciurgan; German: Straßburg) is a village in Rozdilna Raion of Odesa Oblast in Ukraine. It is located along the Kuchurhan River at the north end of the Cuciurgan Reservoir along the border with Transnistria in Moldova. It is the site of highway, rail, and power line border crossings between Ukraine and Moldova. Kuchurhan belongs to Lymanske settlement hromada, one of the hromadas of Ukraine.

== History ==
The village was established in 1808 as Strassburg by Roman Catholic German immigrants from Baden and Alsace to the Kutschurgan Valley, then part of the Russian Empire. It received its present name in 1944 after the remaining German residents were driven from the area by the advancing Soviet army.

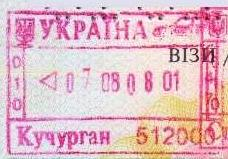
Kuchurhan exit stamp for passport

Ukrainian 24 Kanal journalist Volodymyr Runets reported in March 2016 that Kuchurhan's schoolchildren were being taught anti-Americanism and that most villagers "loathe Ukrainian patriots".

=== Baden ===
Baden (Ukrainian: Очеретівка, romanized: Ocheretivka; Russian: Очеретовка) was a village on the eastern shore of the Cuciurgan Reservoir, now a part of Kuchurhan.

The village was established in 1808 by Roman Catholic German immigrants to the Kutschurgan Valley, then part of the Russian Empire. It was located south of the German village of Straßburg and north of Selz (present-day Lymass'ke). The remaining German residents were driven from the area by the advancing Soviet army in 1944.

== Demographics ==
As of the 2001 Ukrainian census, Kuchurhan had a population of 3,322 inhabitants. The native languages of the population were:

Native languages in Kuchurhan
| | percent |
| Russian | 52.7% |
| Ukrainian | 43.3% |
| Romanian | 3.0% |
| Belarusian | 0.3% |
| German | 0.2% |
| Bulgarian | 0.2% |
| Gagauz | 0.2% |
| others | 0.1% |

== See also ==
- Black Sea Germans
- Roads in Ukraine
- State Highways (Ukraine)
- Transport in Moldova
- Cuciurgan power station
- Eugeniu Știrbu
