= Lake Bile =

Lake in Odesa Oblast, Ukraine

Bile
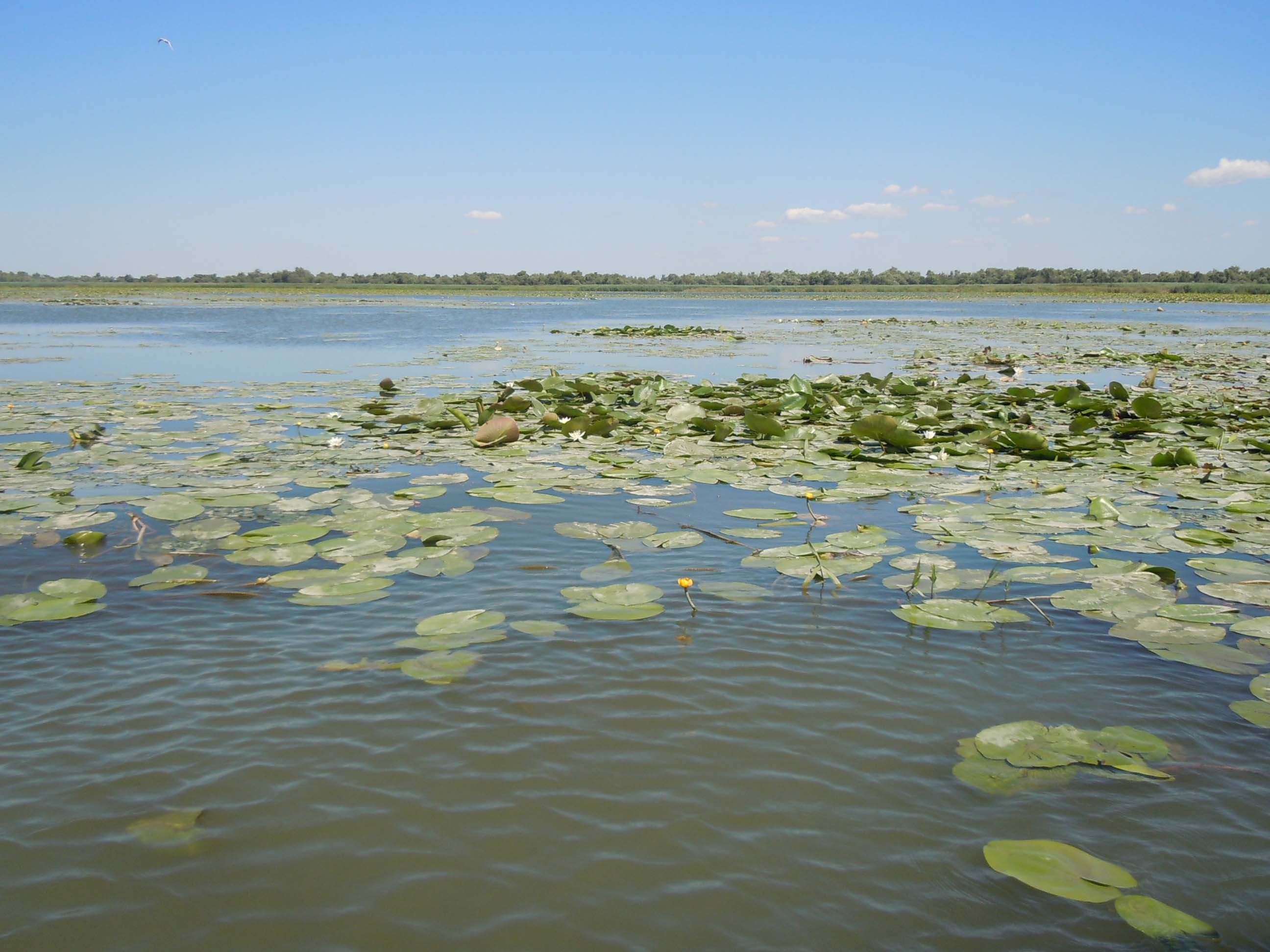
- The view of the lake

- Location within Odesa Oblast
- Location: Odesa Oblast
- Coordinates: 46°27′08.5″N 30°10′52.5″E
- Primary inflows: Turunchuk River
- Primary outflows: Turunchuk River
- Basin countries: Ukraine
- Max. length: 1.9 km (1.2 mi)
- Max. width: 0.8 km (0.50 mi)

Lake Bile (Ukrainian: Біле озеро, lit. 'white lake') is a lake in the south-western Ukraine, in the delta of the Dniester River. It is located south from the village of Maiaky. The lake is 1.7 km long and 0.8 km width. It is connected with the Dniester River and its left branch Turunchuk.

Similar to the other lakes of the Dniester River delta, Lake Bile is inhabited by rare plant species and is a nesting place for bird species. The white water lily (Nymphaea alba), water caltrop (Trapa natans), brandy-bottle (Nuphar lutea), and mint (Mentha sp.) grow in the lake.

== Sources ==
- http://www.poezdnik.kiev.ua/ozera/bile_odessa/
