= Lymanske settlement hromada =

Coordinates: 46°42′5.148″N 29°59′15.349″E

Lymanske settlement hromada Лиманська селищна громада
- Hromada
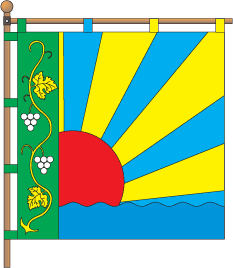
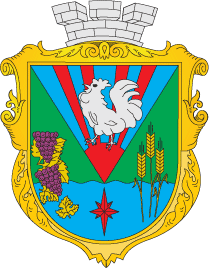
- Flag Coat of arms
- Interactive map of Lymanske settlement hromada
- Country: Ukraine
- Oblast: Odesa Oblast
- Raion: Rozdilna Raion
- Admin. center: Lymanske

Area
  - Total: 252.1 km^{2} (97.3 sq mi)

Population (2022)
  - Total: 14,159
  - Density: 56.16/km^{2} (145.5/sq mi)
- CATOTTG code: UA51140090000048720
- Settlements: 7
- Rural settlements: 1
- Villages: 6

Lymanske settlement hromada (Ukrainian: Лиманська селищна громада) is a hromada in Rozdilna Raion of Odesa Oblast in southwestern Ukraine. Population: 14,159 (2022 estimate)

The hromada consists of a rural settlement of Lymanske and 6 villages:

- Vynohradivka
- Kuchurhan
- Nove
- Novosiltsi
- Shcherbanka
- Stepove

== Links ==
- https://decentralization.gov.ua/newgromada/4350
- https://gromada.info/gromada/lymansca
