= Biliaivka =

City in Odesa Oblast, Ukraine

Biliaivka Біляївка
- City
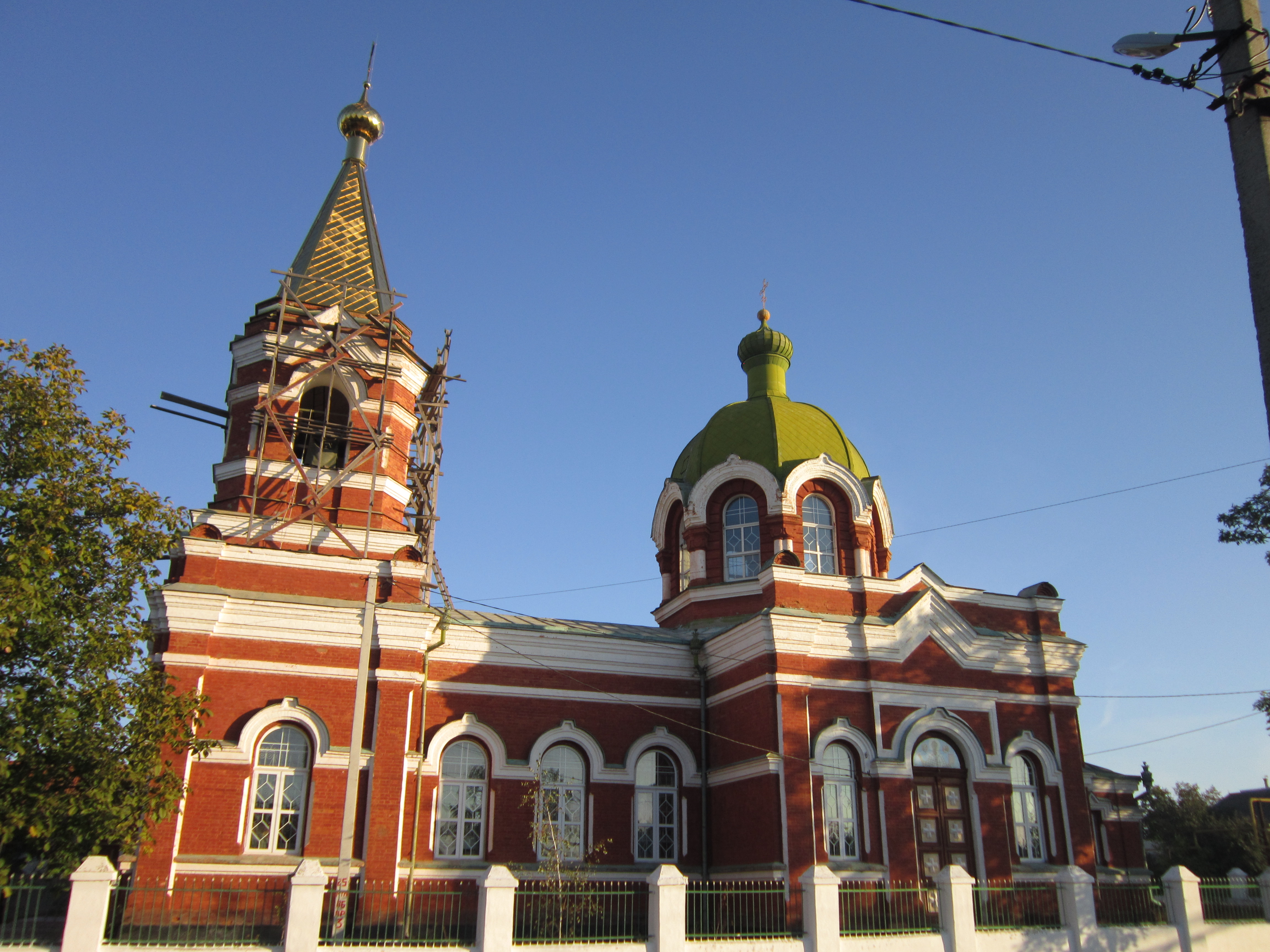
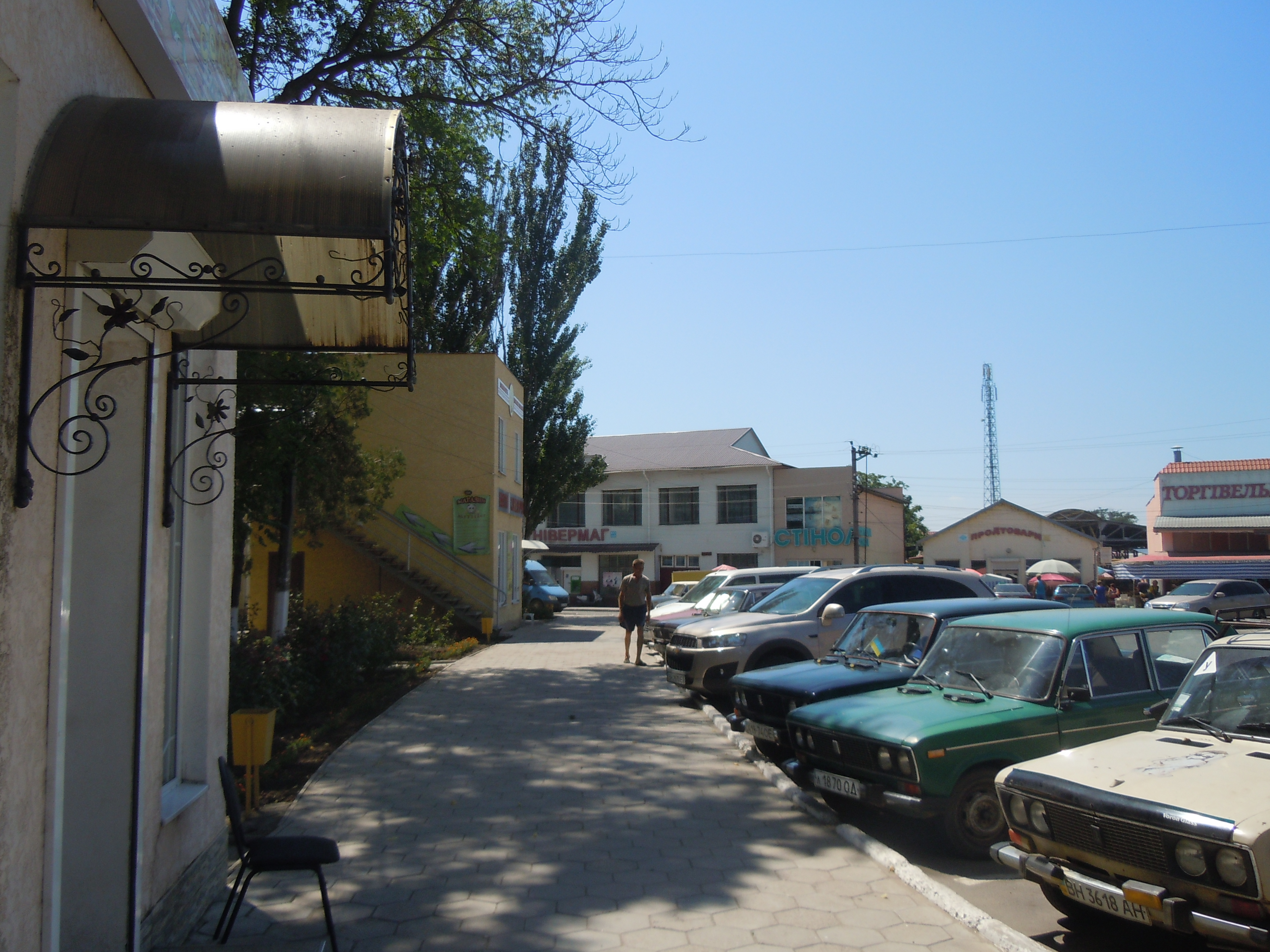
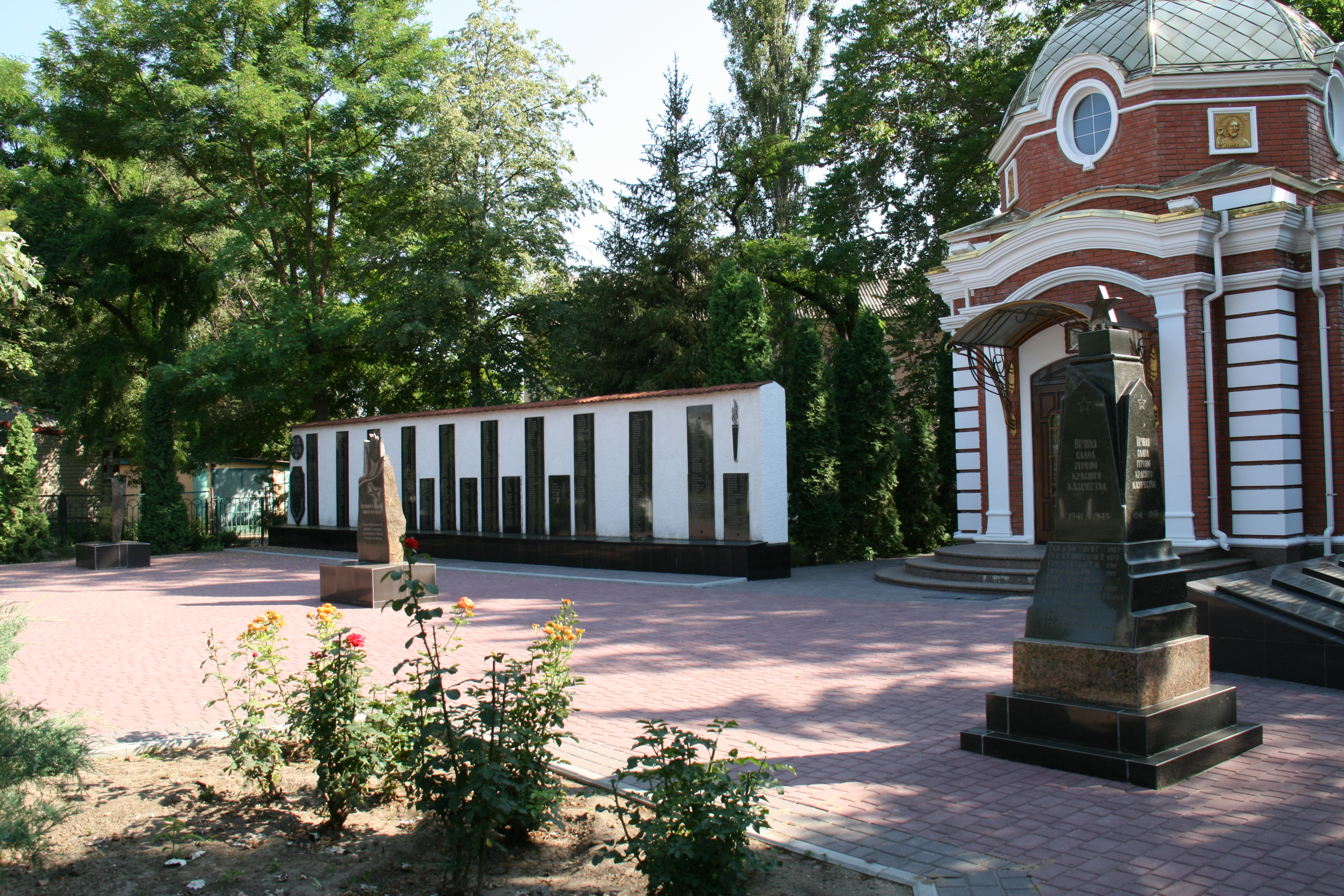
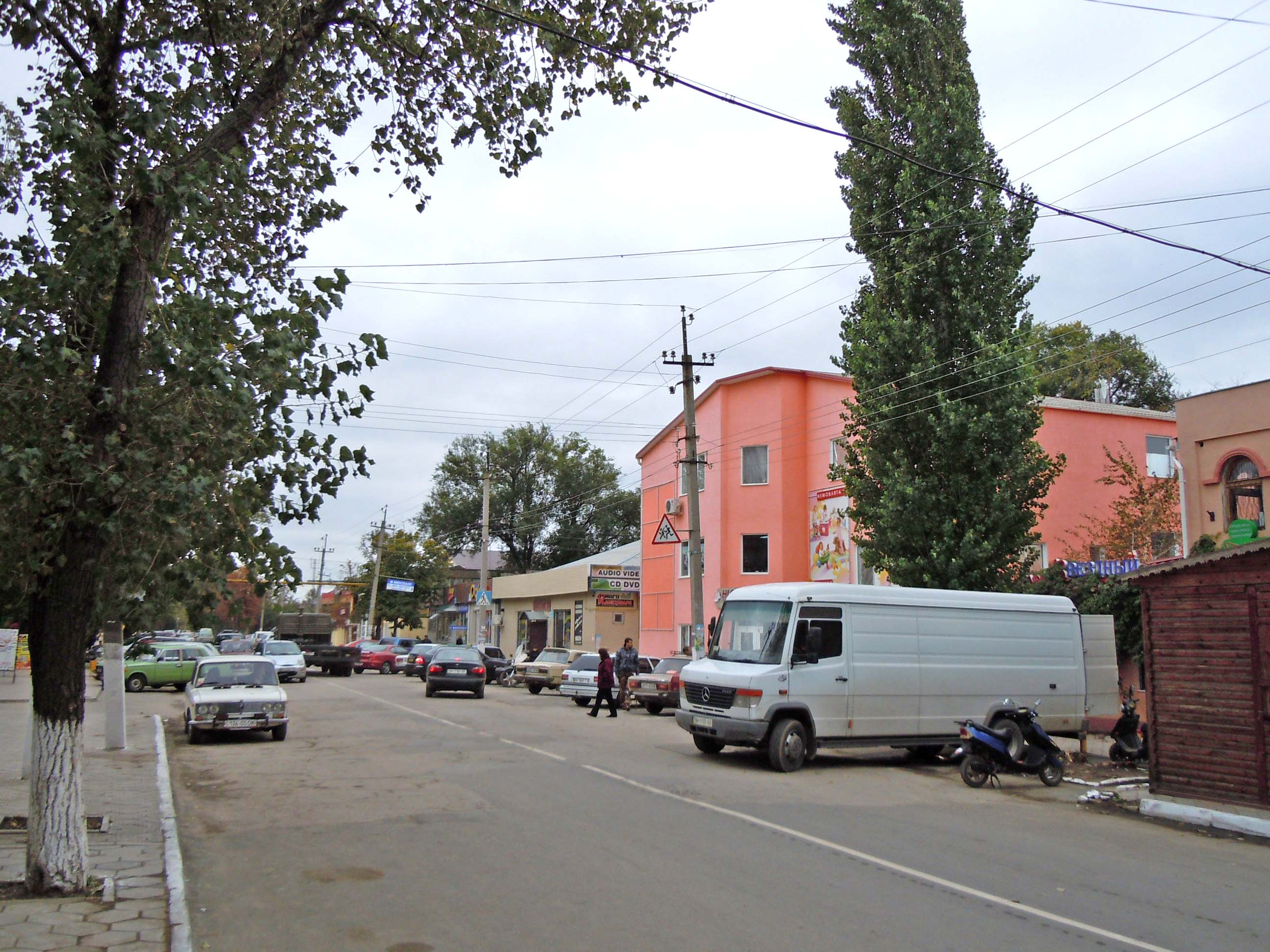
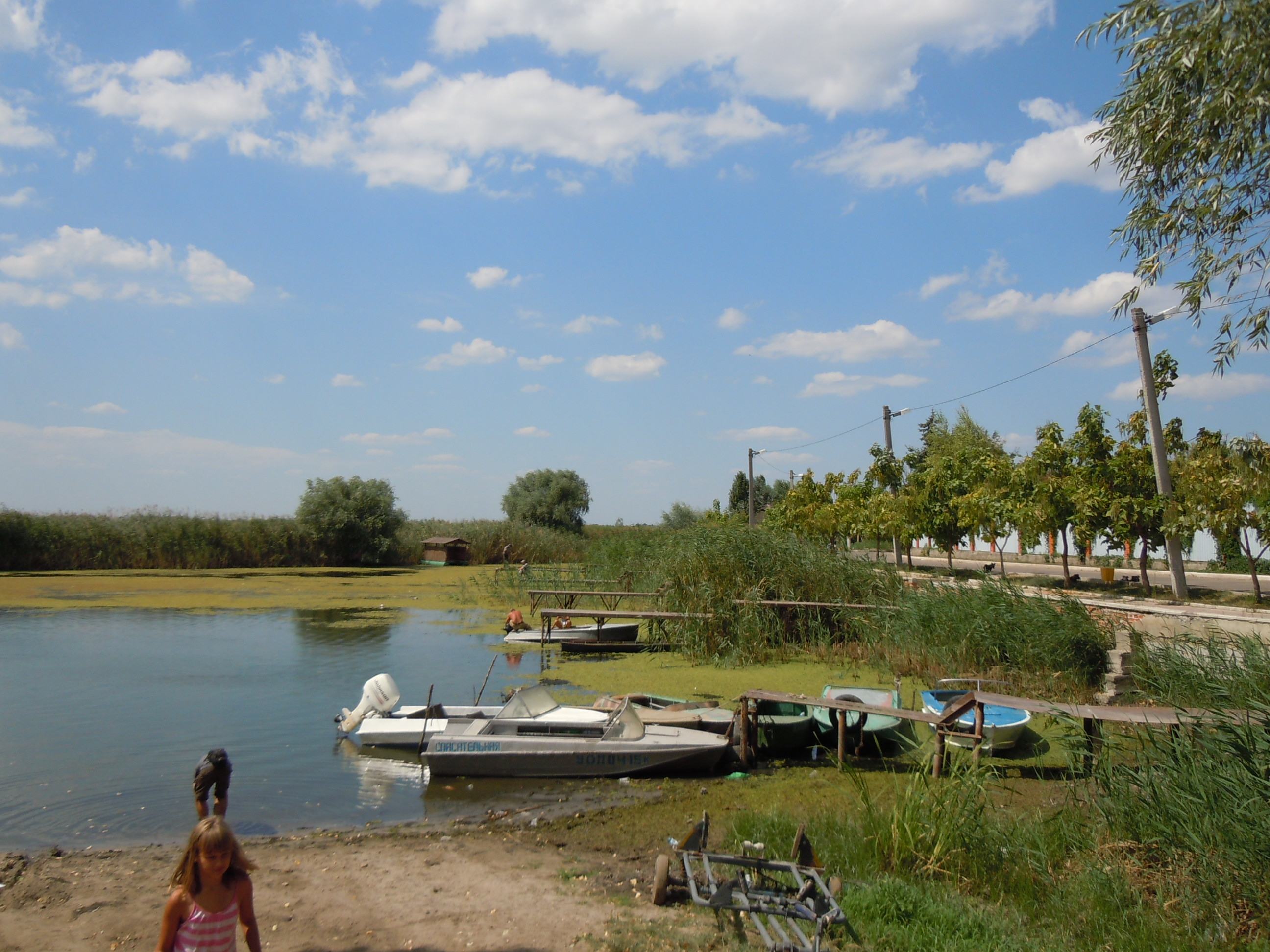
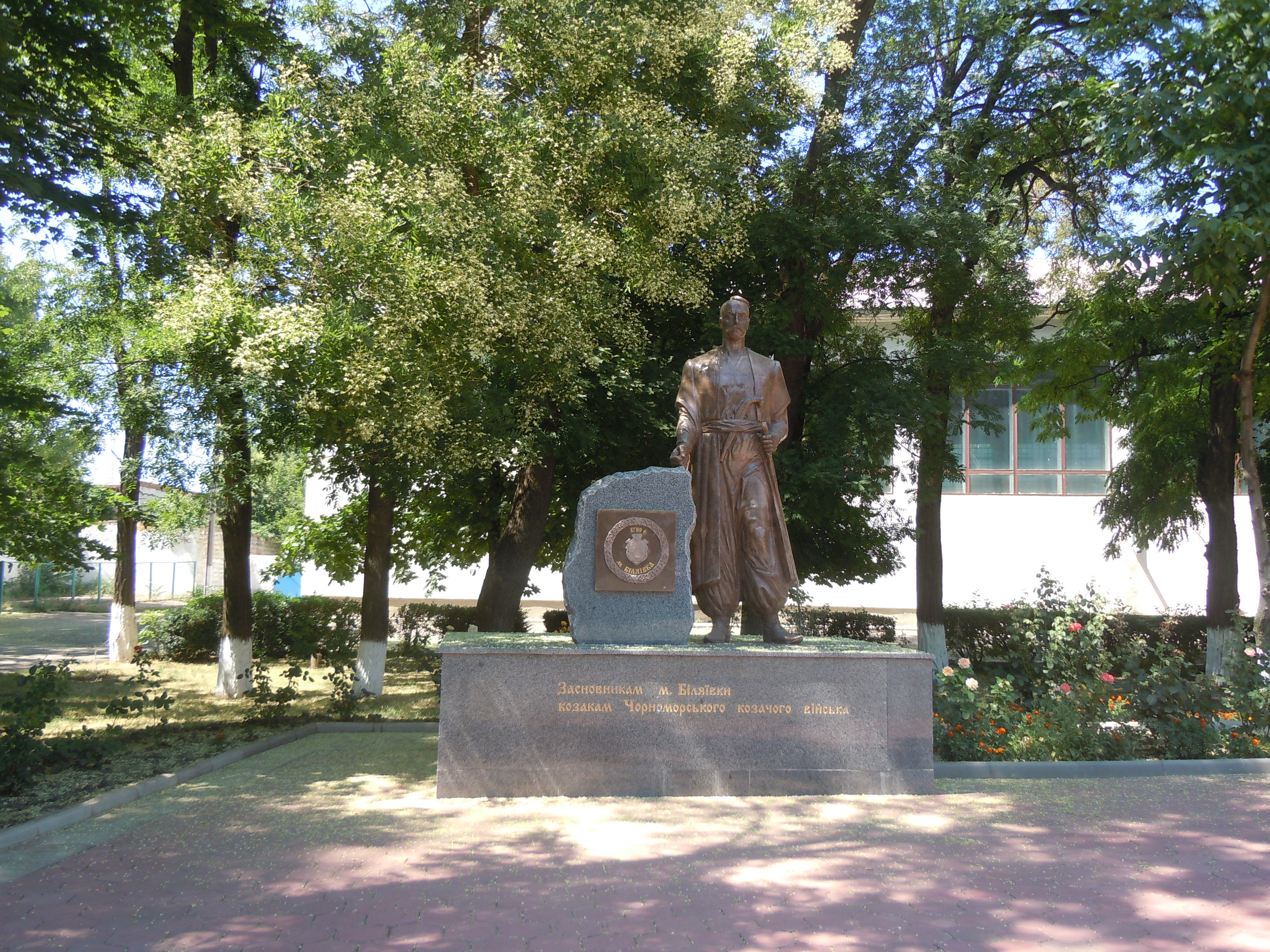

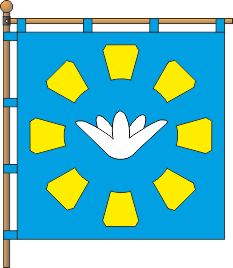
- Flag Coat of arms

- Location in Ukraine Biliaivka (Ukraine)
- Coordinates: 46°28′57.9″N 30°12′05.0″E
- Country: Ukraine
- Oblast: Odesa Oblast
- Raion: Odesa Raion
- Hromada: Biliaivka urban hromada

Area
  - Total: 14.554 km^{2} (5.619 sq mi)

Population (2022)
  - Total: 12,355
- Time zone: UTC+2 (EET)
  - Summer (DST): UTC+3 (EEST)
- Postal code: 67600—604
- Area code: +380-4852
- Climate: Cfa

Biliaivka (Ukrainian: Біляївка, pronounced [biˈlʲɑjiu̯kɐ]) is a city in Odesa Raion, Odesa Oblast, Ukraine. It hosts the administration of Biliaivka urban hromada, one of the hromadas of Ukraine. The city is located in the Dniester Delta, on the left bank of the Turunchuk River. Lake Safiany is located near by the city. Population: 12,355 (2022 estimate). 12.155 (2023 estimate).

== History ==
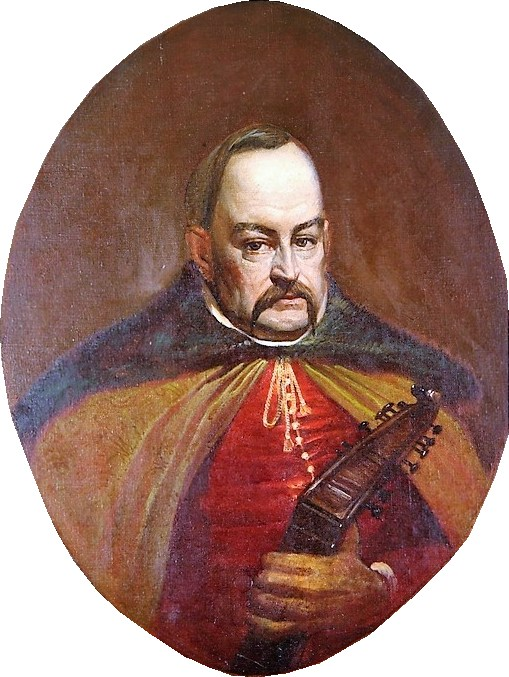
Antin Holovaty – the founder of the city

The populated place (village at that time) was founded by the Ukrainian Cossacks after the elimination of the Zaporizhian Sich. The village called Holovkivka was first mentioned in 1792. The settlers from the Poltava region were moved here in 1794. The first name of the settlement originated from the name of famous Ukrainian Cossack leader, cossack general judge Antin Holovaty. There are several versions of the name origin, but all the versions are connected with his name.

The village started to be a volost administrative center in Odesa county in 1886. It had a population of 2917 people with 250 farmyards. There were two Orthodox churches, schools, six shops, and markets. The river crossing over the Turunchuk River was here.

The settlement gained town status on 2 January 1957, and city status in 1975. Until 2016, Biliaivka was part of Biliaivka Raion, center of Biliaivka Municipality, and the administrative center of the raion. On 28 January 2016, it was designated the city of oblast significance but remained the administrative center of the raion. The municipality was abolished as administrative unit on 18 July 2020 as part of the administrative reform of Ukraine, which reduced the number of raions of Odesa Oblast to seven. The area of Biliaivka Municipality was merged into Odesa Raion.

== Demographics ==
According to the 2001 Ukrainian census, Biliaivka had a population of 14,248 inhabitants. Ethnic Ukrainians account for over 80% of the population, 10% identify as Russians, smaller minorities are Belarusians and Moldovans. The exact ethnic makeup was as follows:

Ethnic groups in Biliaivka
	percent
Ukrainians	83.97%
Russians	10.89%
Moldovans	1.68%
Belarusians	1.08%
Bulgarians	0.69%
Armenians	0.54%
Poles	0.13%
Gagauz	0.11%

Besides the Ukrainians, the city of Biliaivka has a significant number of Germans, Bulgarians, Greeks and Romani.

== Gallery ==
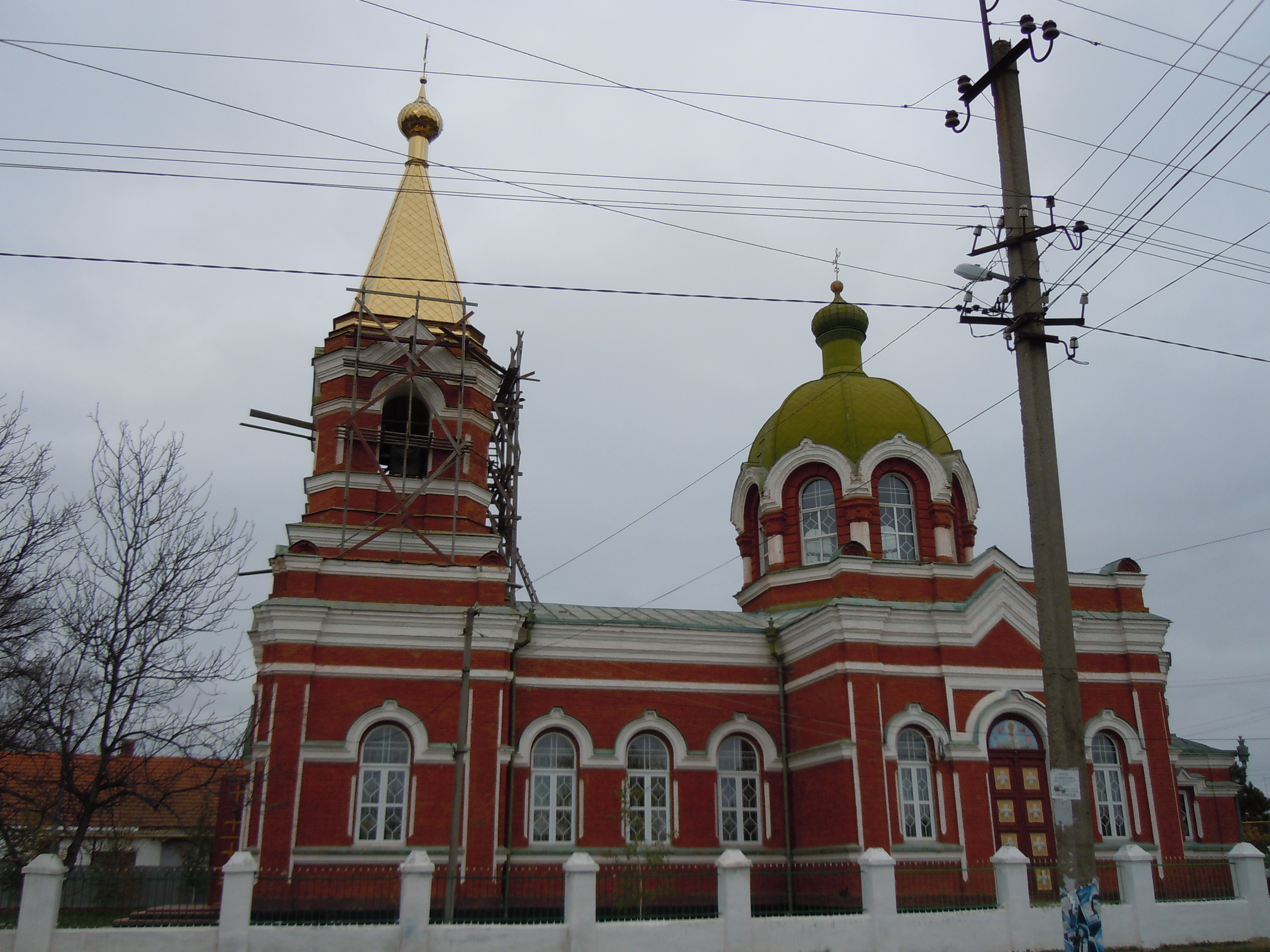
The Saint Nicholas church

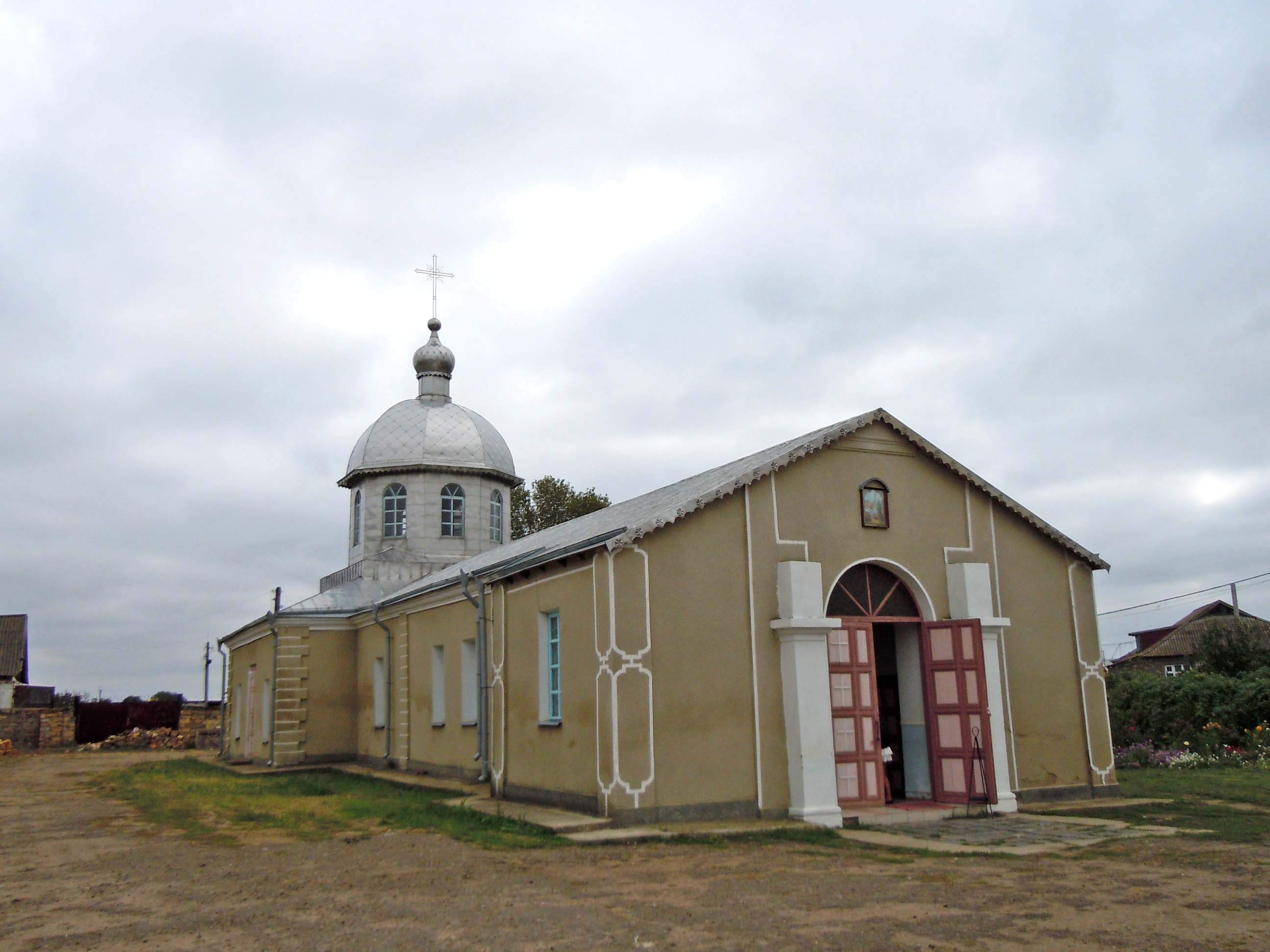
The Dormition church

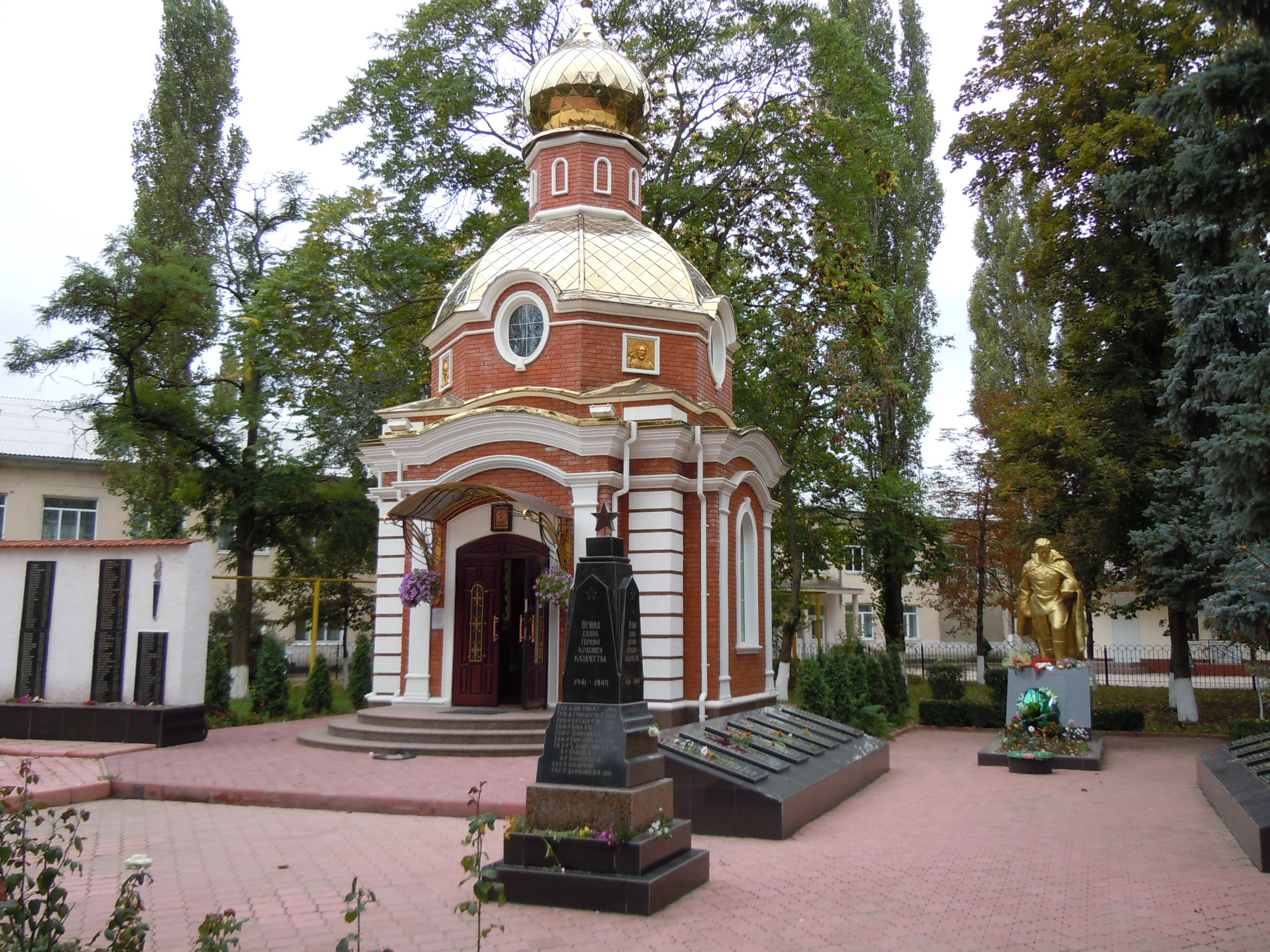
The World War II memorial in the downtown

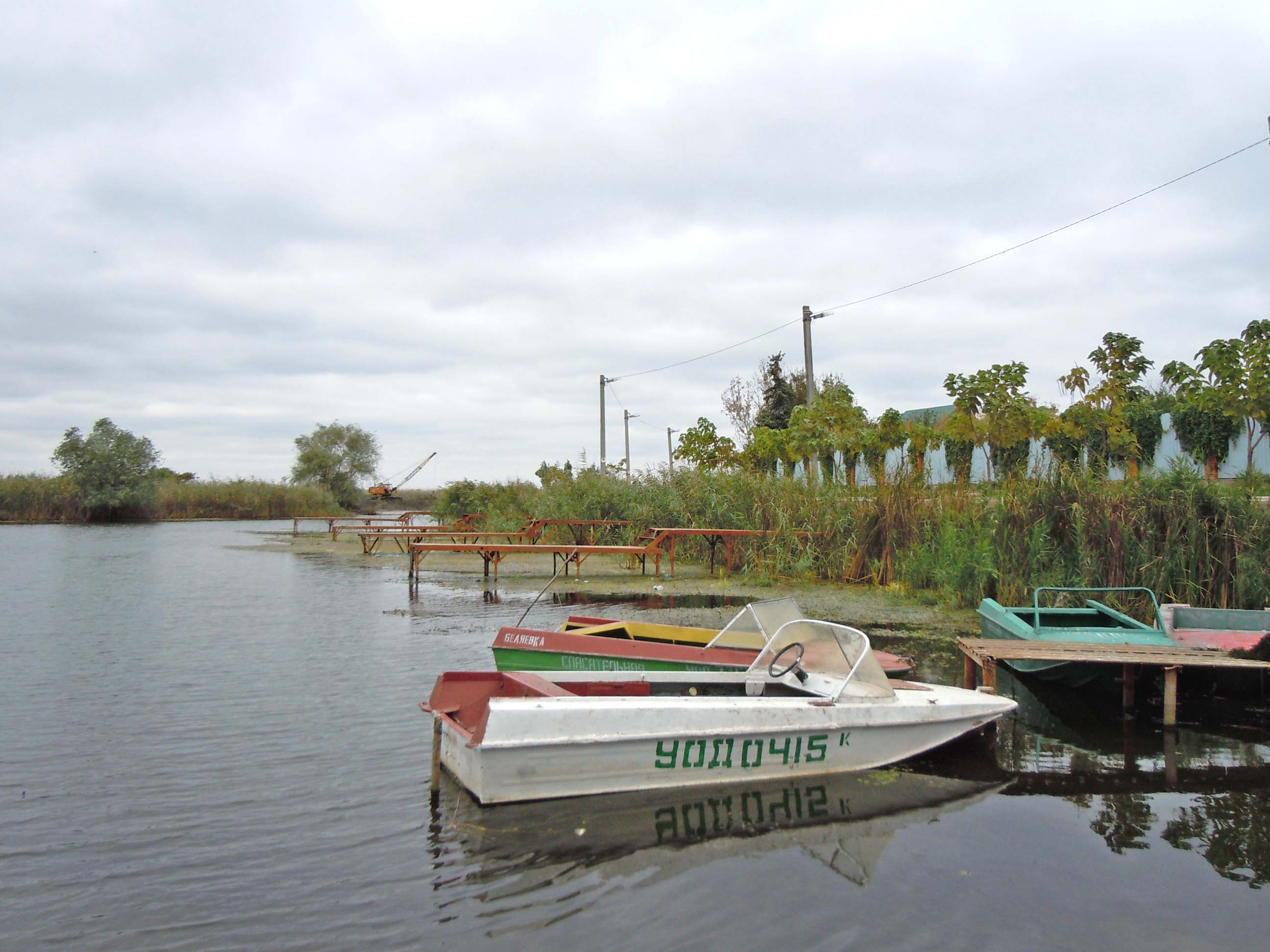
The boat station

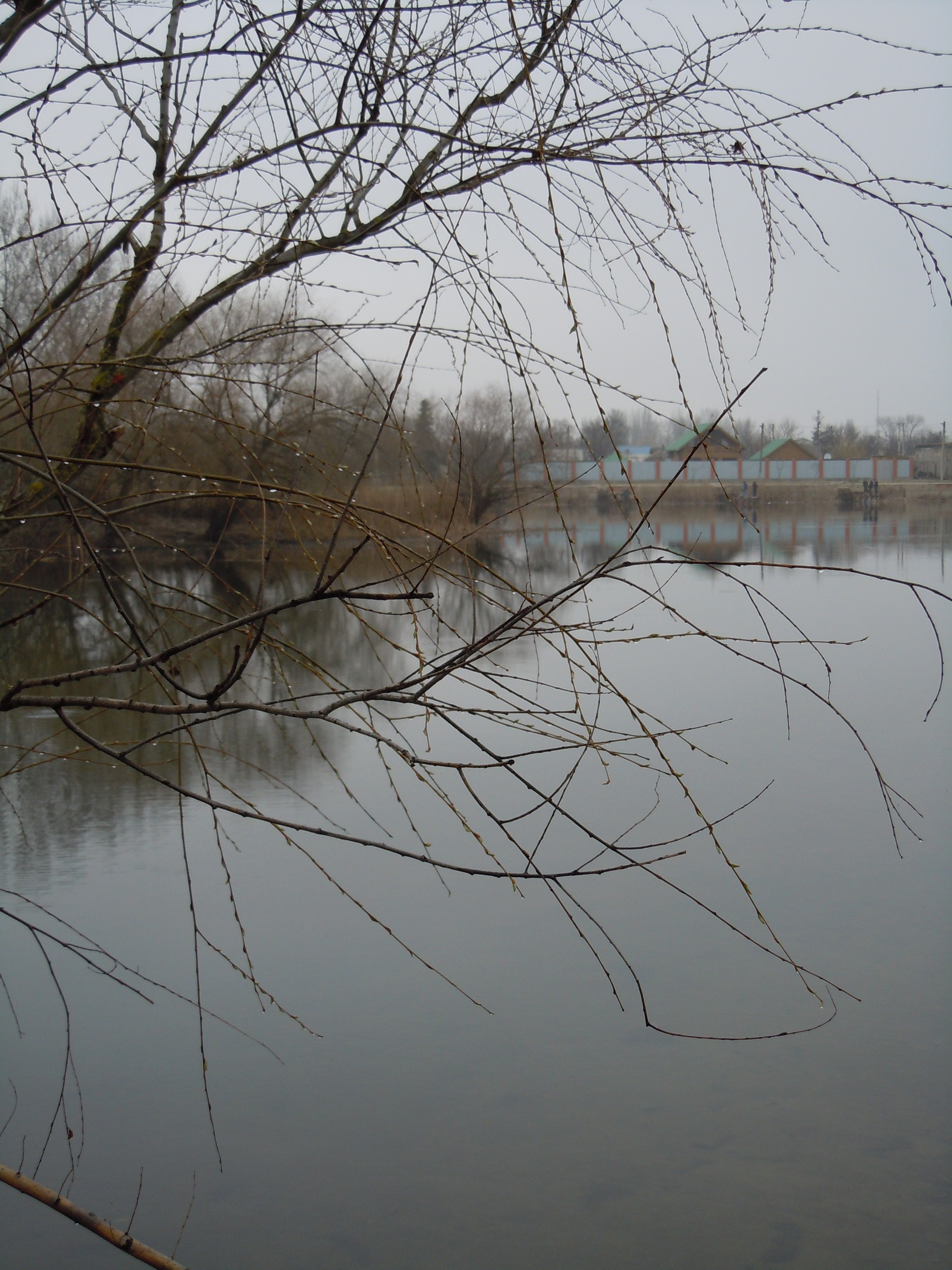
View from Lake Safiany

== Notable people from Biliaivka ==
- Kyrylo Kovalchuk (born 1986), Ukrainian football player
