= Dnestrovsc =

- Town
- Днестро́вск
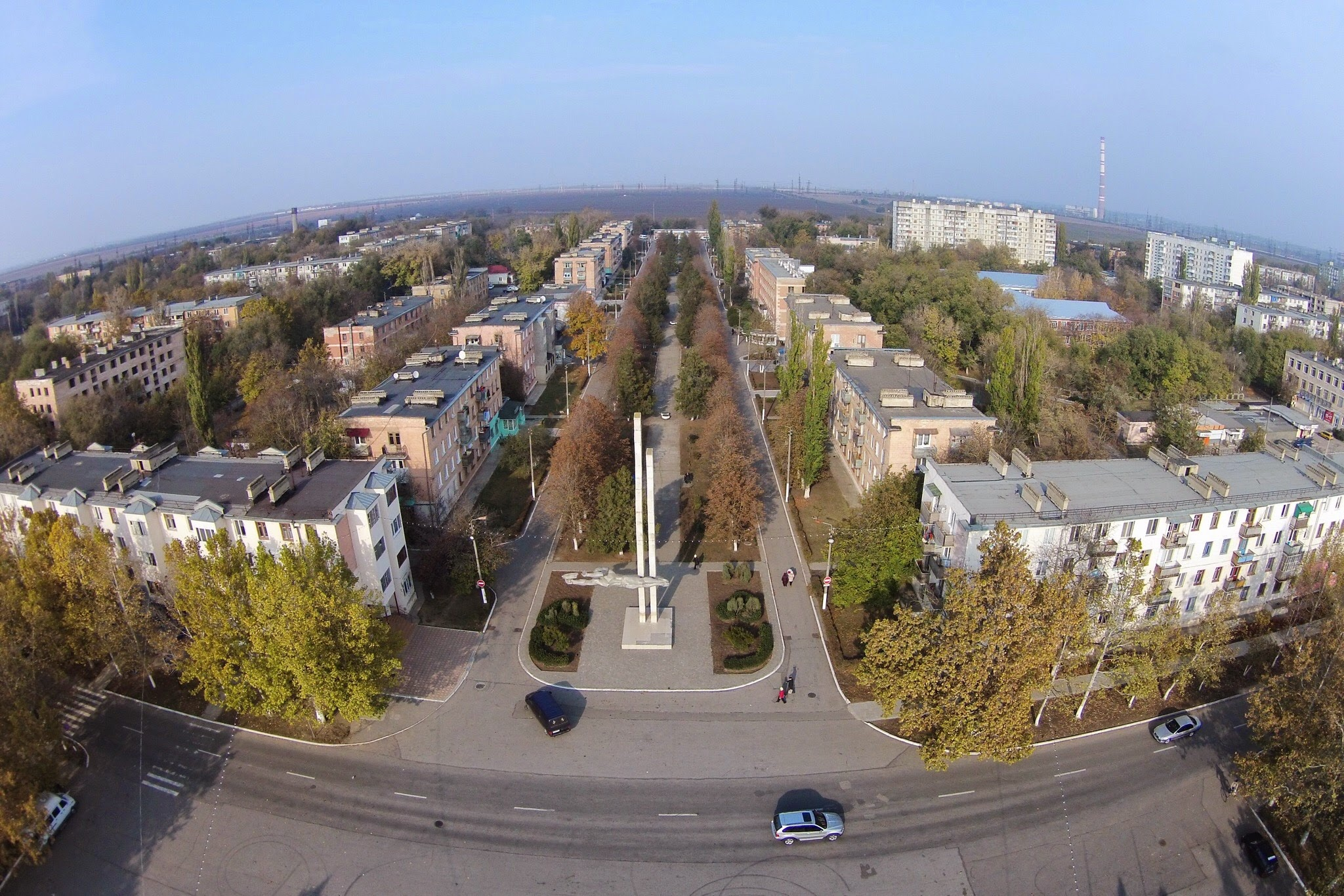

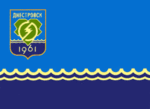
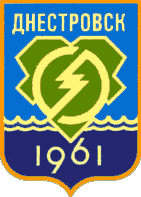
- Flag Coat of arms
- Interactive map of Dnestrovsc
- Location of Dnestrovsc in Moldova
- Coordinates: 46°37′23″N 29°54′44″E
- Country (de jure): Moldova
- Country (de facto): Transnistria (Note: Transnistria's political status is disputed. It considers itself to be an independent state, but this is not recognised by any UN member state. The Moldovan government and the international community consider Transnistria a part of Moldova's territory.)

Government
  - Mayor: Sergey Karyuk
- Elevation: 19 m (62 ft)

Population (2014)
  - Total: 10,436
- Climate: Cfb
- Website: dnestrovsk.name

Dnestrovsc (Romanian: Dnestrovsc or Nistrovsc, Moldovan Cyrillic: Днестровск; Russian: Днестрóвск, romanized: Dnestrovsk; Ukrainian: Дністровськ, romanized: Dnistrovs'k) is a town in the Transnistria, (Note: Transnistria's political status is disputed. It considers itself to be an independent state, but this is not recognised by any UN member state. The Moldovan government and the international community consider Transnistria a part of Moldova's territory.) near the border with Ukraine. It is at the shores of the Cuciurgan Reservoir and is home to the Cuciurgan power station, also known as Moldavskaya GRES. It has since 1990 been administered by the breakaway Transnistrian Moldovan Republic as a part of its Slobozia District.

It is a company town which was founded in early Soviet times by the establishment of a large power plant, Moldavskaya GRES, today owned by Inter RAO UES.

At the 1989 census, Dnestrovsc had a population of 14,876. At the 2004 census it had ca. 11,200 inhabitants. According to the 2004 census, the population of the town was 12,382 inhabitants, of which 2,580 (20.83%) were Moldovans (Romanians), 3,390 (27.37%) Ukrainians and 5,249 (42.39%) Russians.
