= Kuchurhan (river) =

Kuchurhan Cuciurgan
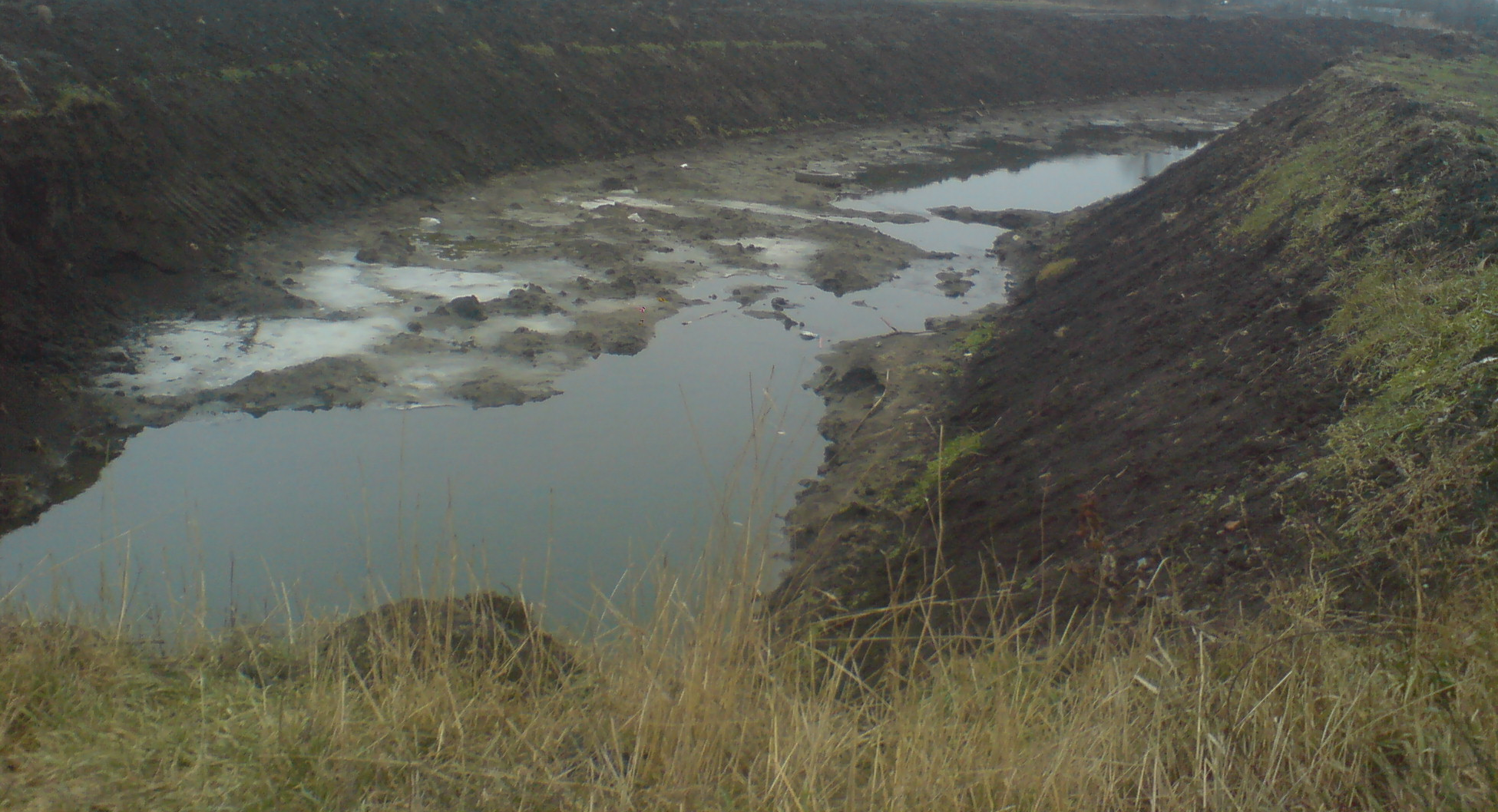
- Native name: Кучурган (Ukrainian); Cuciurgan (Romanian)

Location
- Country: Ukraine, Moldova

Physical characteristics
- Mouth: Turunchuk
  - coordinates: 46.5539°N 29.9285°E
- Length: 109 km (68 mi)
- Basin size: 2,090 km^{2} (810 sq mi)

Basin features
- Progression: Turunchuk→ Dniester→ Dniester Estuary→ Black Sea

The Kuchurhan (Ukrainian: Кучурган; Romanian: Cuciurgan) is a river in Eastern Europe. It is a tributary of the Turunchuk (a branch of the Dniester) which begins on the Podolian Upland in Ukraine. It then flows SSE and forms part of the border between Transnistria in Moldova and the Odesa Oblast in Ukraine. The river is 109 kilometres (68 mi) long and drains 2,090 square kilometres (810 sq mi).

A dam has been built on the river just north of the Dniester, forming the Kuchurhan Reservoir. The village of Kuchurhan in Ukraine is located near the river just north of the reservoir and is the site of an important border crossing into Transnistria.
