= Kuchurhan Reservoir =

Coordinates: 46.660°N 29.955°E

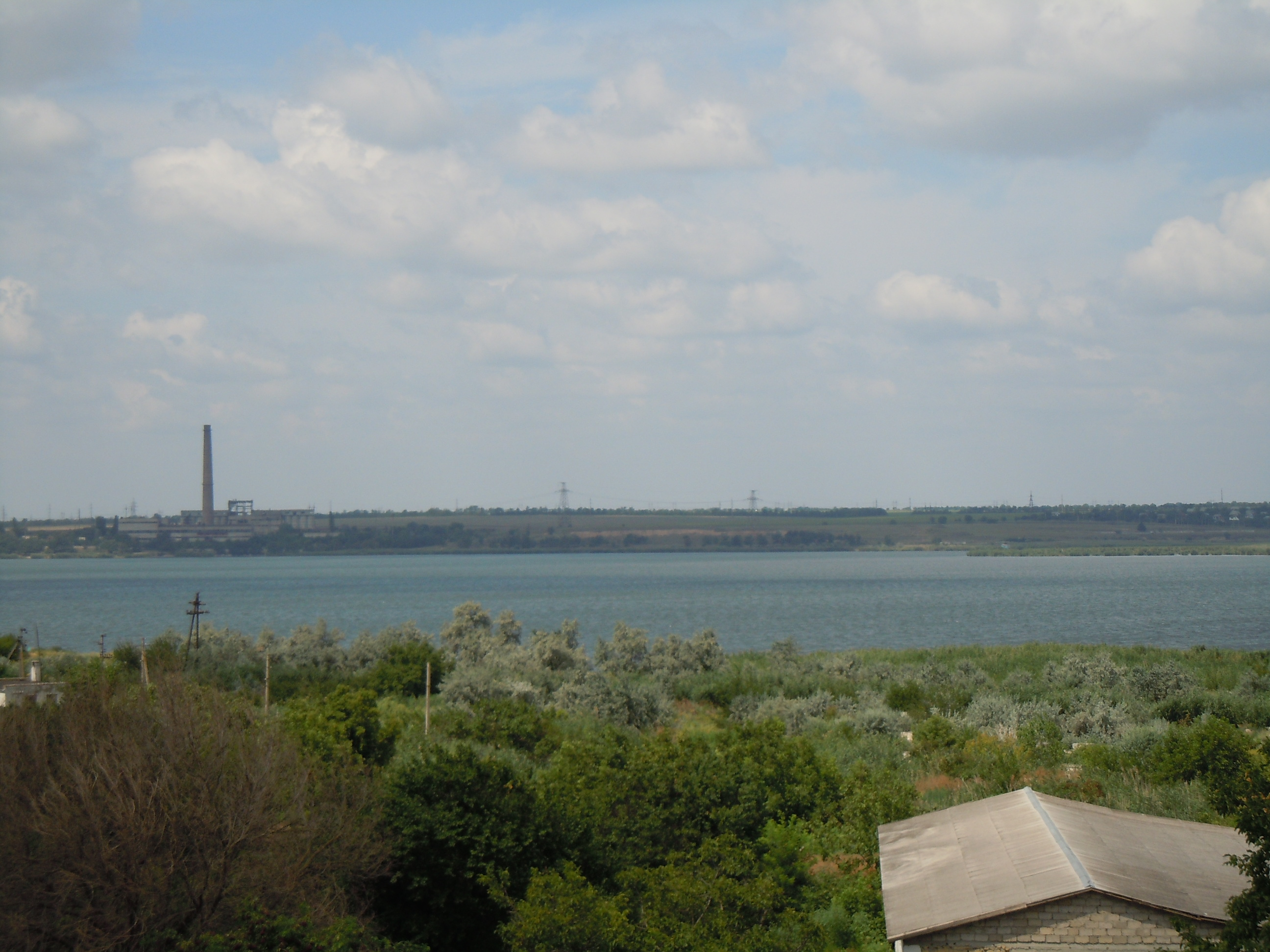

- Location within Ukraine
- Type: Power station reservoir
- Primary inflows: Kuchurhan River
- Primary outflows: Turunchuk River
- Basin countries: Ukraine, Moldova

The Kuchurhan Reservoir (also Lake Kuchurhan; Romanian: Lacul de acumulare Cuciurgan; Russian: Кучурганский лиман, romanized: Kuchurgansky liman) is a large water reservoir, built on Kuchurhan River on the state border between Ukraine and Moldova (Transnistria).

The lake is located in the south-eastern part of the Left Bank of the Dniester of Moldova on the border with the Odesa Oblast of Ukraine and its water resources are shared between the two countries. It was created by damming the Kuchurhan River just north of where it flows into the Dniester. The reservoir is 3 kilometres (1.9 mi) km wide at the dam and 20 kilometres (12 mi) long. It has a total water surface area of 27.2 square kilometres (10.5 sq mi). Before construction of the dam, there was already a liman in the southern part of the Kuchurhan river valley.

Lake Kuchurhan is a popular resort area for the inhabitants of nearby Tiraspol, the capital of Transnistria. The fossil fuel burning power station at Dnestrovsc utilizes water from the reservoir. There is no hydroelectric power plant associated with the dam.

== Sources ==
- Plummer, Julian, ed. (1997). Irrigation in the Countries of the Former Soviet Union in Figures. Food and Agriculture Organization of the United Nations. ISBN 978-92-5-104071-3.
