= Turunchuk =

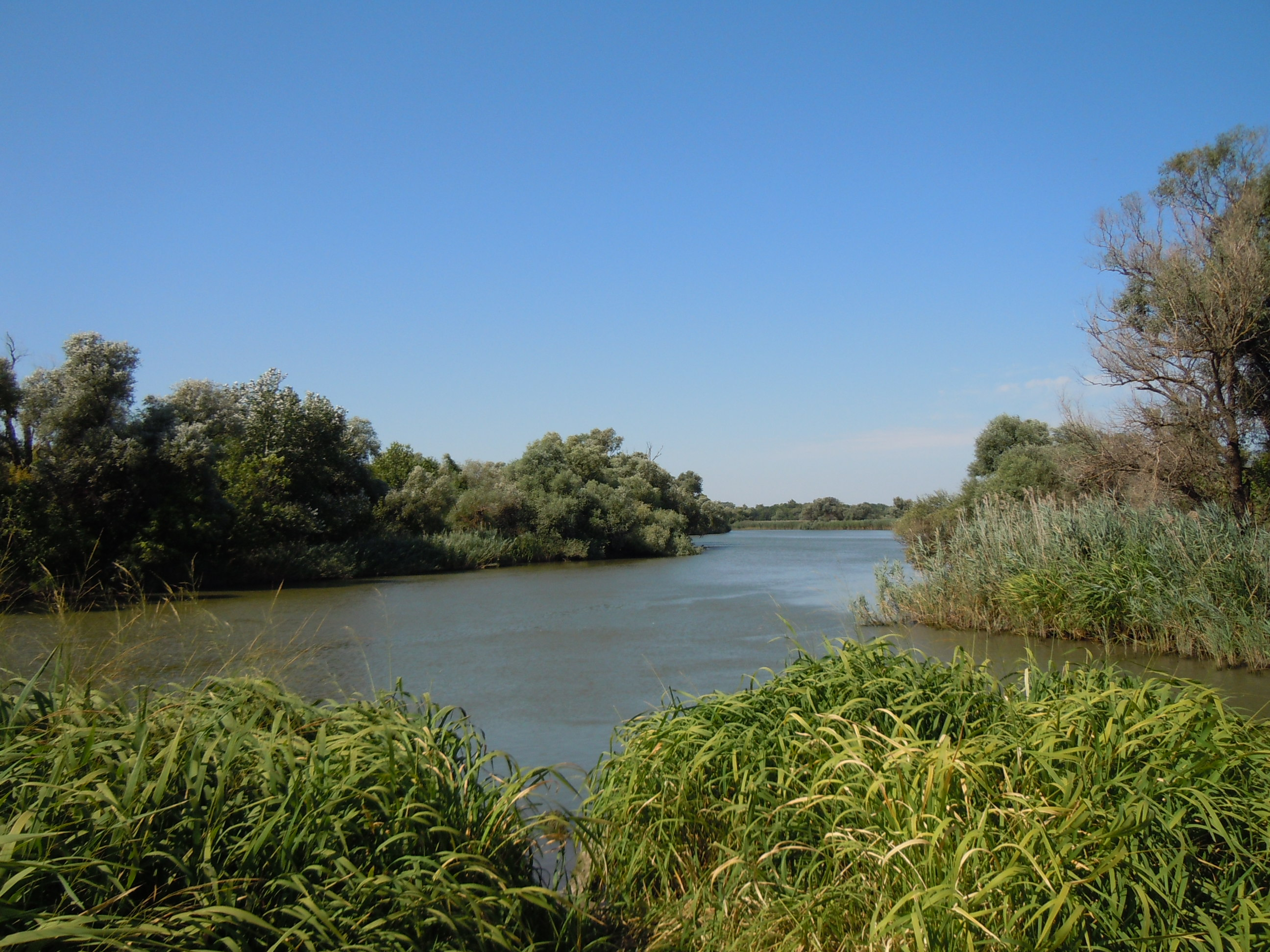
- The Turunchuk River off the city of Biliaivka
- Native name: Turunciuc (Romanian); Турунчук (Ukrainian)

Location
- Country: Ukraine, Moldova

Physical characteristics
- Source
  - location: Dniester River near Cioburciu
  - coordinates: 46.6649°N 29.7647°E
- Mouth
  - location: Dniester River near Biliaivka
  - coordinates: 46.4456°N 30.2060°E
- Length: 60 km (37 mi)

Basin features
- Tributaries
  - left: Kuchurhan

Turunchuk River (Romanian: Turunciuc; Ukrainian: Турунчук), also called New Dniester is a left branch of the Dniester River, which flows from Moldova to Ukraine, when inflows to the Dniester River near the city of Biliaivka. The total length of the river is 60 km, width 30 m, depth up to 6 m, in some cases up to 9 m.

== Sources ==
- Природа Приднестровской Молдавской Республики: Учебное пособие для учащихся 8 класса общеобразовательных школ ПМР / Сост. О. З. Лысенко. — Тирасполь, 2003. — 48 с.
