= Kryzhanivka, Odesa Raion, Odesa Oblast =

Rural locality in Odesa Oblast, Ukraine

Kryzhanivka Крижанівка Krizanivka, Krizhanivka, and Kryzhanovka
- Village
- Kryzhanivka
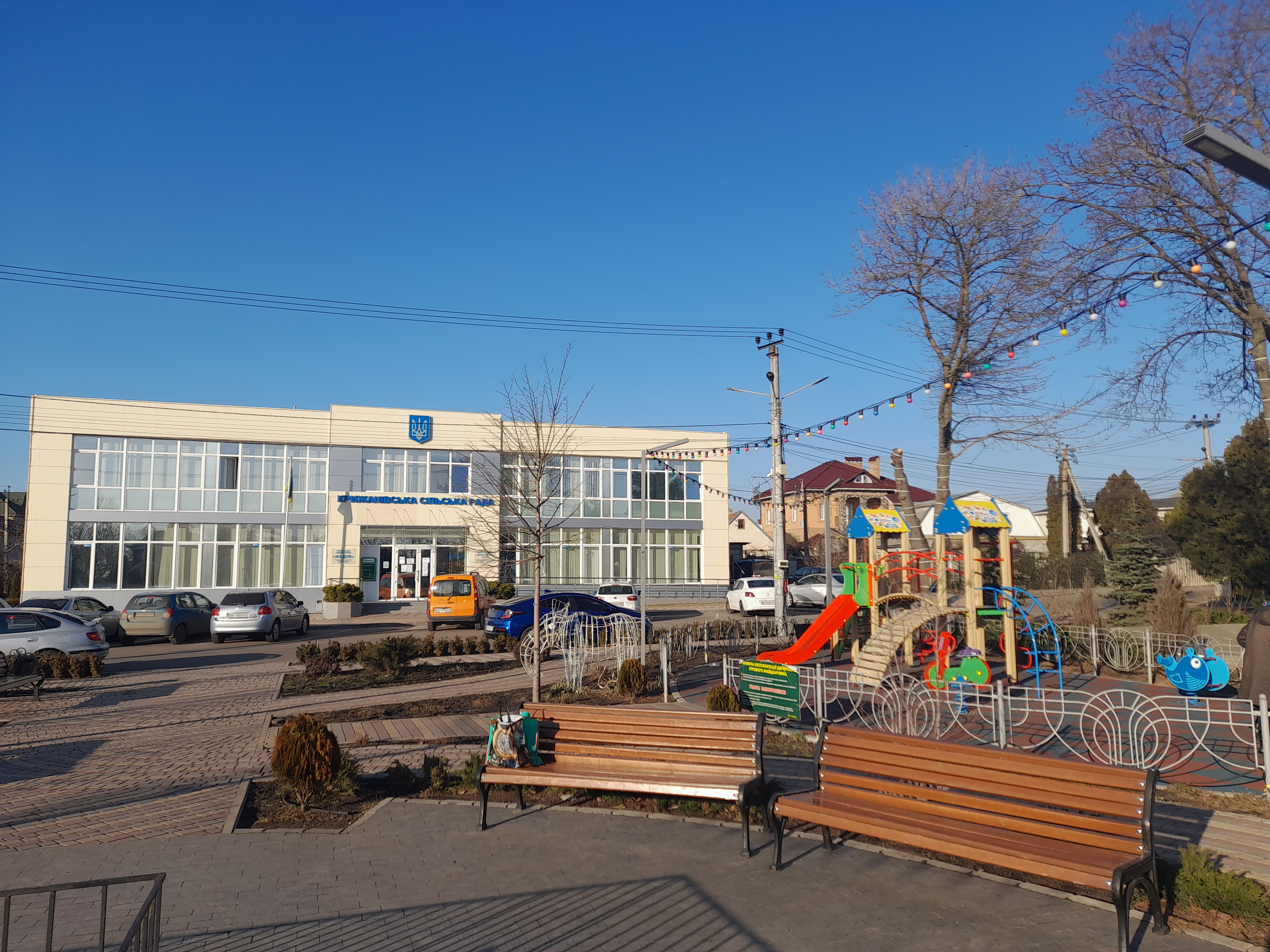
- Central square of the village

- Location within Odesa Oblast Location within Ukraine
- Coordinates: 46°33′42″N 30°47′41″E
- Country: Ukraine
- Oblast: Odesa Oblast
- Raion: Odesa Raion
- Hromada: Fontanka rural hromada

Area
  - Land: 159 km^{2} (61 sq mi)
- Elevation: 26 m (85 ft)

Population (2015)
  - Total: 3 076
  - Density: 0.019/km^{2} (0.049/sq mi)
- Time zone: UTC+2 (EET (Kyiv))
  - Summer (DST): UTC+3 (EEST)
- Postal Code: 67572

Kryzhanivka (Ukrainian: Крижанівка) is a village in Odesa Raion of Odesa Oblast, Ukraine. It belongs to Fontanka rural hromada, one of the hromadas of Ukraine. It is a part of the M28 and M14 Highway.

Until 18 July 2020, Kryzhanivka belonged to Lyman Raion. The raion was abolished in July 2020 as part of the administrative reform of Ukraine, which reduced the number of raions of Odesa Oblast to seven. The area of Lyman Raion was split between Berezivka and Odesa Raions, with Kryzhanivka transferred to Odesa Raion.

== See also ==
- Igor Uchytel
