= Kryzhanivka =

Kryzhanivka may refer to several places in Ukraine:

- Kryzhanivka, Khmenlytskyi Raion, Khmenlytskyi Oblast, a village
- Kryzhanivka, Odesa Raion, Odesa Oblast, a village
- Крижанівка, Konopliane rural hromada, Berezivka Raion, Odesa Oblast, a village
- Крижанівка, Petrovirivka rural hromada, Berezivka Raion, Odesa Oblast, a village
- Kryzhanivka, an astronomic observatory
