= Odessagas =

Ukrainian energy company

Odessagaz Public Joint Stock Company
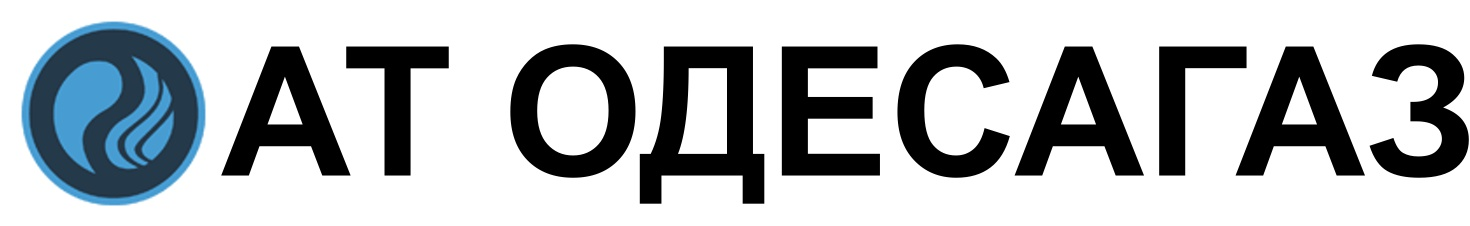

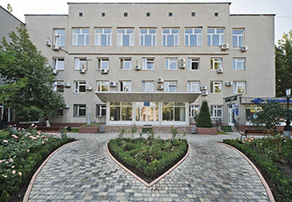
- Native name: Одесагаз
- Company type: Private
- Industry: Oil and gas
- Founded: March 11, 1994
- Headquarters: Odesa, Ukraine
- Key people: Uchytel Igor (Chairman of the Supervisory Board )
- Products: Natural gas
- Services: Gas distribution
- Website: odgaz.odessa.ua

Odessagas (Public Joint Stock Company "ODESSAGAZ") was established by decree of the President of Ukraine on June 15, 1994, on the corporatization of companies. PJSC Odesagas is one of the oldest companies in gas transmission system of Ukraine.

== History ==
Gas plant in Odessa was founded in 1864. Contract between Odessa City Administrative Council and Bavarian August Ridinger was signed on April 7, 1864. The gas plant produced gas for city streets lighting until 1913.

The total length of gas pipelines was over 80 km and there were 2,000 gas lighting lanterns in Odessa by 1917. Odessa's gas plant was in decline from 1920 to 1931, but over the next 10 years it was restored. Gas supply system became integral part of the city's gas industry. This happened also because of gas affordability (27 kopecks per 1 m2 for consumers).

The period from 1945 to 1950 was the time of second birth of gas industry in Odessa. The number of gasified apartments in this period increased from 510 in 1945 to 5510 in 1950, the length of gas pipelines increased from 12.2 km to 67.3 km in 1950.

"Gas of Ukraine" subsidiary awarded the staff of PJSC "Odesagas" the prize for "The best company for gas supply and gasification of Ukraine" in 2004.

PJSC "Odesagas" unites gas companies of Odesa region: 16 gas operation departments and also parent company's gas services and departments. Number of employees - 2875 people.

The total length of gas pipelines is 12056.623 km and it includes 419 gas distribution points, 1865 cabinet-type points and 913 cathodic protection stations. Natural gas is delivered to industrial enterprises, communal facilities and the population of 19 cities, 36 urban-type villages and 1,136 villages in the Odesa region.

827,617 apartments were gasified, and among them 586,694 apartments were supplied with natural gas. 387,021 gas meters have been installed and are in operation.

== Structure ==
PJSC "Odesagas" includes 16 branches located in Odesa region:

- ANANYIV GAS MANAGEMENT DEPARTMENT;
- ARTSIZ GAS MANAGEMENT DEPARTMENT;
- BALTA GAS MANAGEMENT DEPARTMENT;
- BEREZIVKA GAS MANAGEMENT DEPARTMENT;
- BOLGRAD GAS MANAGEMENT DEPARTMENT;
- IVANIVKA GAS MANAGEMENT DEPARTMENT;
- IZMAIL GAS MANAGEMENT DEPARTMENT;
- KOTOVSK GAS MANAGEMENT DEPARTMENT;
- OVIDIOPOL GAS MANAGEMENT DEPARTMENT;
- ROZDILNA GAS MANAGEMENT DEPARTMENT;
- SHIRYAEVE GAS MANAGEMENT DEPARTMENT;
- RENI GAS MANAGEMENT DEPARTMENT;
- BILHOROD-DNISTROVSKYI GAS MANAGEMENT DEPARTMENT;
- ODESA INTERDISTRICT GAS MANAGEMENT DEPARTMENT;
- ODESA GAS MANAGEMENT DEPARTMENT.
