= Chornomorske, Odesa Oblast =

Rural locality in Odesa Oblast, Ukraine

Chornomorske Чорноморське
- Rural settlement
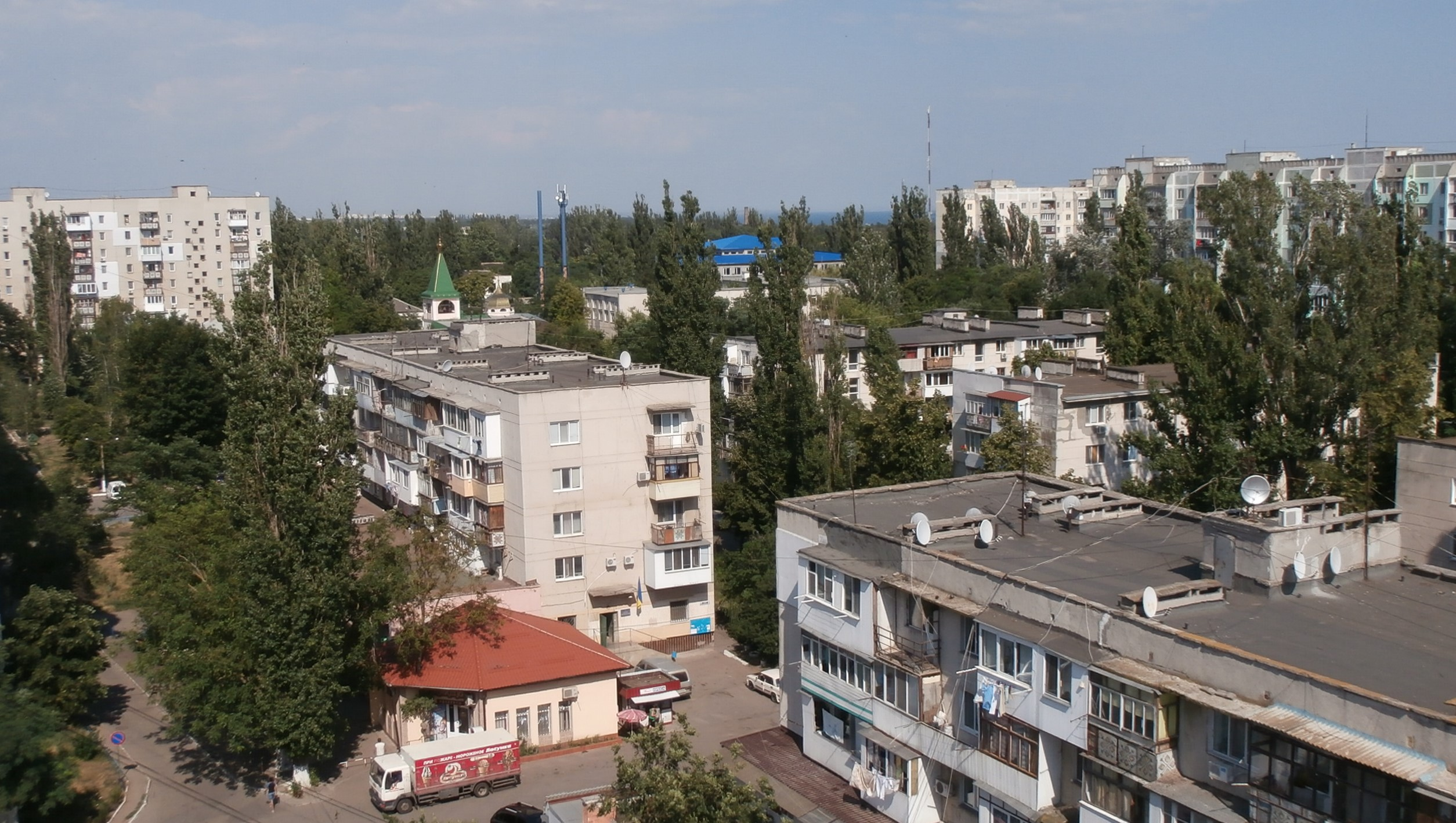
- The down-town of Chornomorske

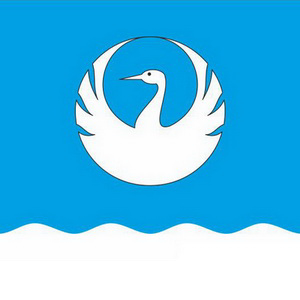
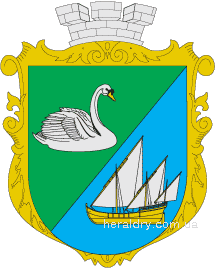
- Flag Coat of arms

- Location within Odesa Oblast Location within Ukraine
- Coordinates: 46°35′9″N 30°56′29″E
- Country: Ukraine
- Oblast: Odesa Oblast
- Raion: Odesa Raion
- Hromada: Chornomorske settlement hromada
- urban-type settlement: 1988
- Chornomorske village rada: Chornomorske

Area
  - Total: 1.92 km^{2} (0.74 sq mi)

Population (2022)
  - Total: 7,016
  - Density: 3,650/km^{2} (9,460/sq mi)
- Time zone: UTC+2 (EET)
  - Summer (DST): UTC+3 (EEST)
- Postal code: 67553
- Area code: +380 48

Chornomorske (Ukrainian: Чорноморське) is a rural settlement in Odesa Oblast of Ukraine. Before 1978 it was known as Hvardiyske village. It hosts the administration of Chornomorske settlement hromada, one of the hromadas of Ukraine. The 28th Mechanized Brigade is stationed in the settlement. Its population is 7,016 (2022 estimate).

== History ==
Until 18 July 2020, Chornomorske belonged to Lyman Raion. The raion was abolished in July 2020 as part of the administrative reform of Ukraine, which reduced the number of raions of Odesa Oblast to seven. The area of Lyman Raion was split between Berezivka and Odesa Raions, with Chornomorske transferred to Odesa Raion.

Until 26 January 2024, Chornomorske was designated urban-type settlement. On this day, a new law entered into force which abolished this status, and Chornomorske became a rural settlement.
