= Vapniarka, Odesa Raion, Odesa Oblast =

Rural locality in Odesa Oblast, Ukraine

Vapnyarka Вапнярка Vapnjarka and Vapniarka
- Village
- Vapnyarka
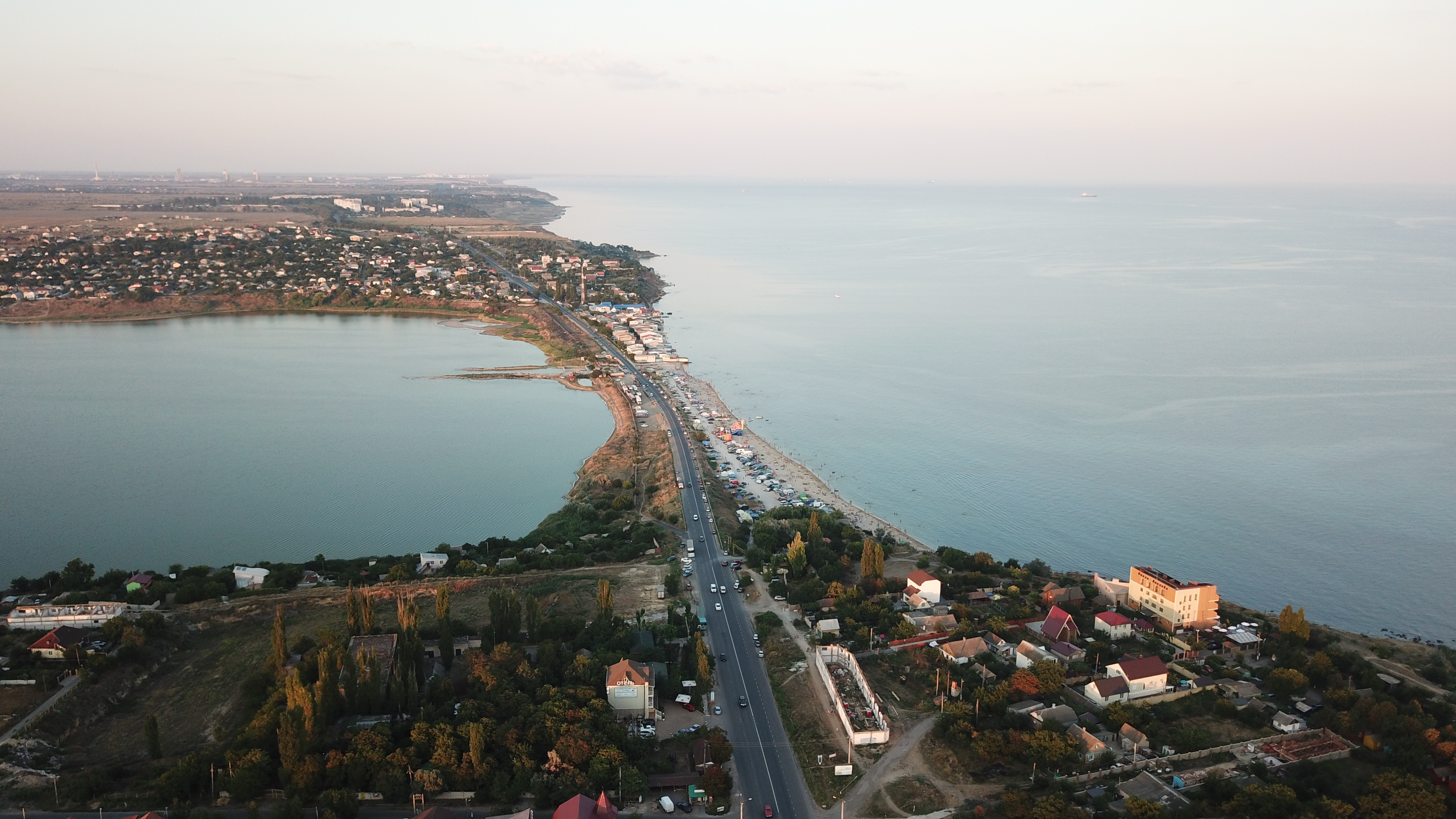
- Village skyline of Vapnyarka along with Nova Dafinivka

- Location within Odesa Oblast Location within Ukraine
- Coordinates: 46°34′22″N 30°53′16″E
- Country: Ukraine
- Oblast: Odesa Oblast
- Raion: Odesa Raion
- Hromada: Fontanka rural hromada
- Founded: 1920's

Area
  - Land: 2.67 km^{2} (1.03 sq mi)
- Elevation: 26 m (85 ft)

Population
  - Total: 731
  - Density: 274/km^{2} (709/sq mi)
- Time zone: UTC+2 (EET (Kyiv))
  - Summer (DST): UTC+3 (EEST)
- Postal Code: 67572
- Area code: +380 4852

Vapniarka (Ukrainian: Вапнярка) is a village in Ukraine, Odesa Oblast, Odesa Raion. It belongs to Fontanka rural hromada, one of the hromadas of Ukraine. Vapniarka has a population of 731. The village was formed because of the Constituency 139 of Ukraine.

Until 18 July 2020, Vapniarka belonged to Lyman Raion. The raion was abolished in July 2020 as part of the administrative reform of Ukraine, which reduced the number of raions of Odesa Oblast to seven. The area of Lyman Raion was split between Berezivka and Odesa Raions, with Vapniarka transferred to Odesa Raion.

== Population ==
As of January 12, 1989, Vapnyarka had a population of 743: 333 men and 410 women.

As of December 5, 2001, Vapnyarka had a population of 729.

=== Language distribution ===
Vapnyarka's language distribution.

Vapnyarka Language Distribution
| Language | Percent |
|---|---|
| Ukrainian | 67.58% |
| Russian | 29.82% |
| Armenian | 1.09% |
| Moldovan | 0.82% |
| Bulgarian | 0.41% |
| Belarusian | 0.14% |
| Hungarian | 0.14% |

== Localities near Vapnyarka ==
List of Localities near Vapnyarka within the 50 km range.

Localities
| Name | Distance |
|---|---|
| Odesa (stone) meteorite, Ukraine | 12.3 km (7.7 miles) |
| Grossliebenthal meteorite | 34.0 km (21.2 miles) |
