= Vyzyrka rural hromada =

Rural locality in Odesa Oblast, Ukraine

Vyzyrka rural hromada Визирська сільська громада
- Hromada
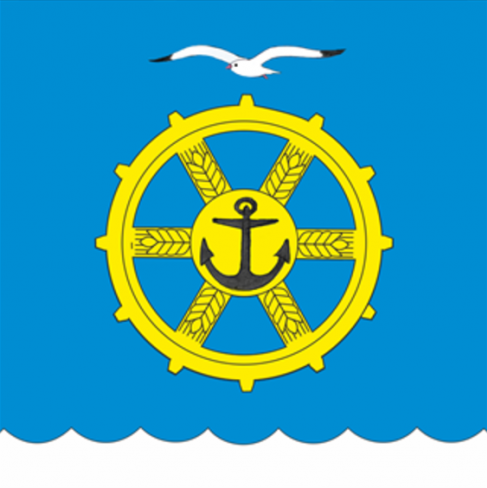
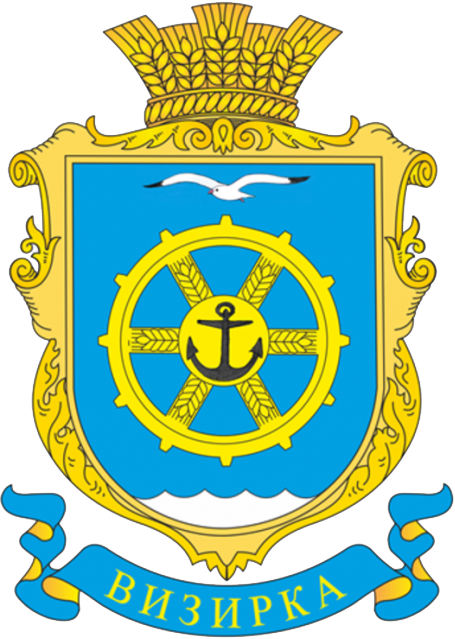
- Flag Coat of arms
- Interactive map of Vyzyrka rural hromada
- Coordinates: 46°46′N 31°02′E
- Country: Ukraine
- Oblast: Odesa Oblast
- Raion: Odesa Raion
- Admin. center: Vyzyrka

Area
  - Total: 255.24 km^{2} (98.55 sq mi)

Population (2021)
  - Total: 9,621
  - Density: 37.69/km^{2} (97.63/sq mi)
- CATOTTG code: UA51100110000098468
- Settlements: 19
- Villages: 19
- Website: https://vyzyrska-gromada.gov.ua/

Vyzyrka rural territorial hromada (Ukrainian: Визирська сільська територіальна громада) is a hromada in Odesa Raion of Odesa Oblast in southwestern Ukraine. The administrative center is the village of Vyzyrka. Formed by the decision of the Odessa Regional Council of August 8, 2018 by merging the Vyzyrka, Lyubopil, and Pershotravnevo village councils of the Lyman Raion of Odesa Oblast.

The hromada consists of 19 villages:

- Butivka
- Vyzyrka
- Voronivka
- Dmytrivka
- Zorya Truda
- Kalynivka
- Kinne
- Kordon
- Lyubopil
- Mar'yanivka
- Mishchanka
- Nova Vilshanka
- Port
- Prychornomorske
- Pshonianove
- Ranzhevoe
- Stepanivka
- Tyligulske
- Shyroke
