= Lyman Raion, Odesa Oblast =

Former subdivision of Odesa Oblast, Ukraine

Lyman Raion Лиманський район
- Raion
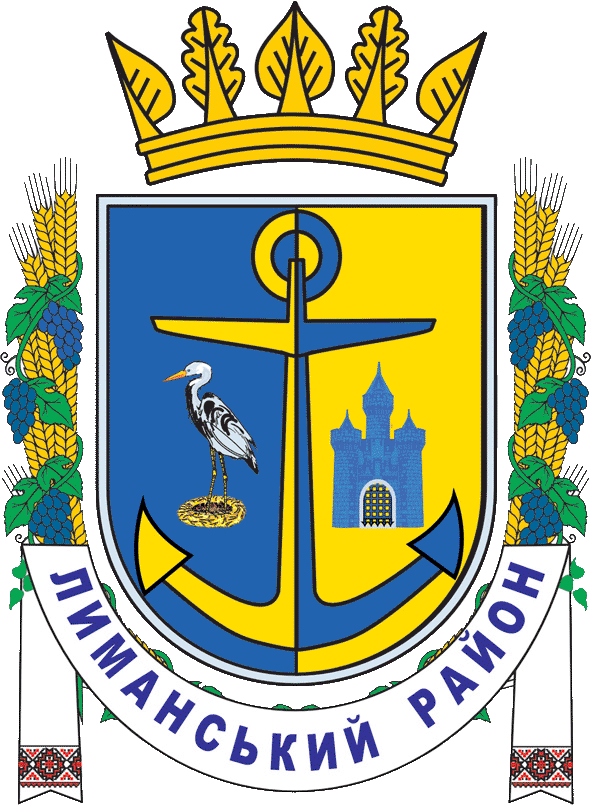
- Flag Coat of arms

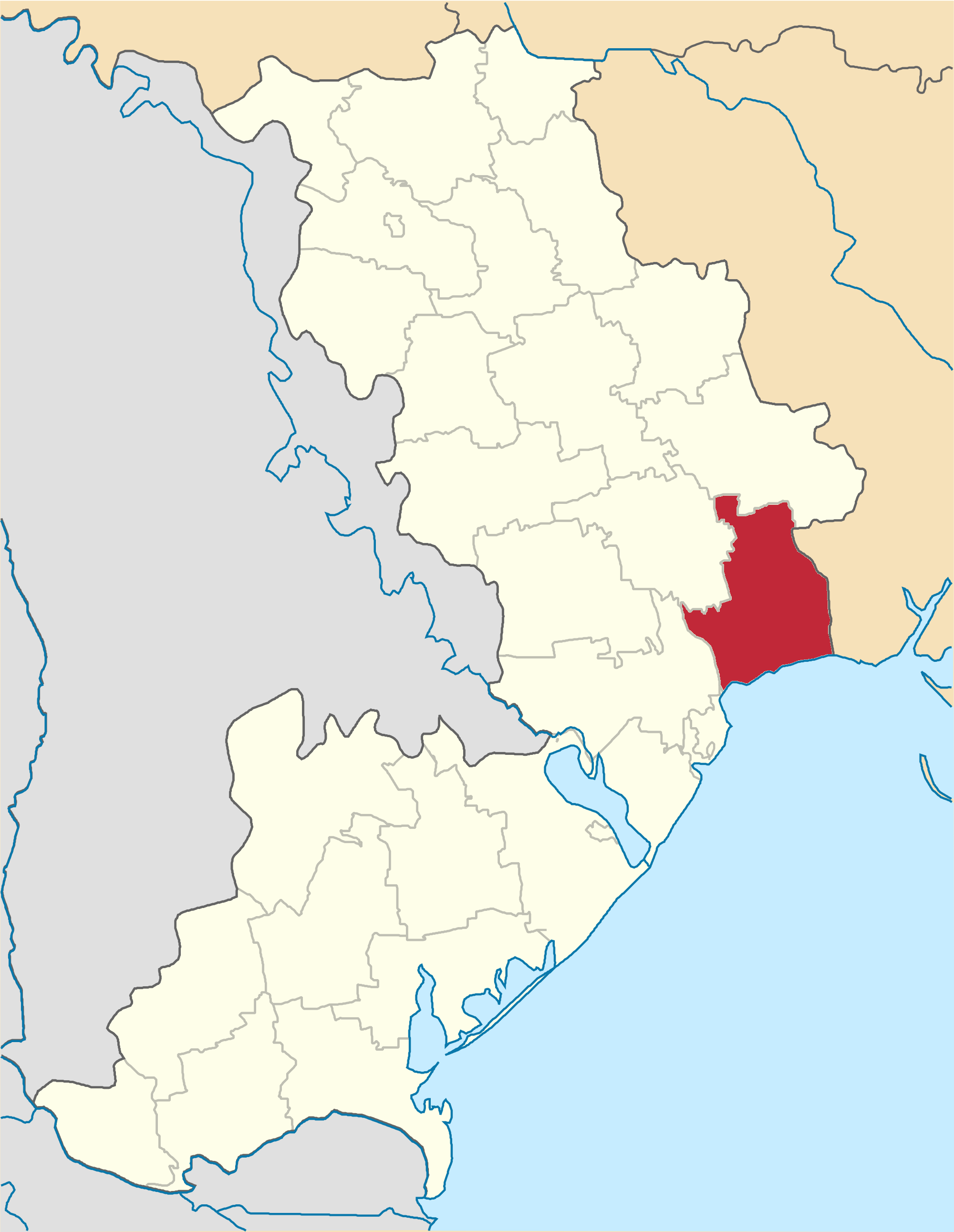
- Coordinates: 46°49′12″N 30°56′42″E
- Country: Ukraine
- Oblast: Odesa Oblast
- Established: 1923
- Disestablished: 18 July 2020
- Admin. center: Dobroslav
- Subdivisions: List: — city councils; — settlement councils; — rural councils; Number of localities: — cities; — urban-type settlements; 60 — villages; — rural settlements

Area
  - Total: 1,487 km^{2} (574 sq mi)

Population (2020)
  - Total: 72,605
  - Density: 48.83/km^{2} (126.5/sq mi)
- Time zone: UTC+02:00 (EET)
  - Summer (DST): UTC+03:00 (EEST)
- Postal index: 67500—67587
- Area code: 380-04864

Lyman Raion (Ukrainian: Лиманський район) was a raion (district) in Odesa Oblast of Ukraine. Its administrative center was the urban-type settlement of Dobroslav. The raion was abolished on 18 July 2020 as part of the administrative reform of Ukraine, which reduced the number of raions of Odesa Oblast to seven. The area of Lyman Raion was split between Berezivka and Odesa Raions. The last estimate of the raion population was 72,605 (2020 est.).

On 21 May 2016, Verkhovna Rada adopted decision to rename Kominternivske Raion to Lyman Raion and Kominternivske to Dobroslav according to the law prohibiting names of Communist origin.

At the time of disestablishment, the raion consisted of six hromadas:

- Chornomorske settlement hromada with the administration in the urban-type settlement of Chornomorske, transferred to Odesa Raion;
- Dobroslav settlement hromada with the administration in Dobroslav, transferred to Odesa Raion;
- Fontanka rural hromada with the administration in the selo of Fontanka, transferred to Odesa Raion;
- Krasnosilka rural hromada with the administration in the selo of Krasnosilka, transferred to Odesa Raion;
- Kurisove rural hromada with the administration in the selo of Kurisove, transferred to Berezivka Raion;
- Vyzyrka rural hromada with the administration in the selo of Vyzyrka, transferred to Odesa Raion.
