= Fontanka, Ukraine =

Village in Odesa Oblast, Ukraine

Fontanka Фонтанка
- Village
- Fontanka
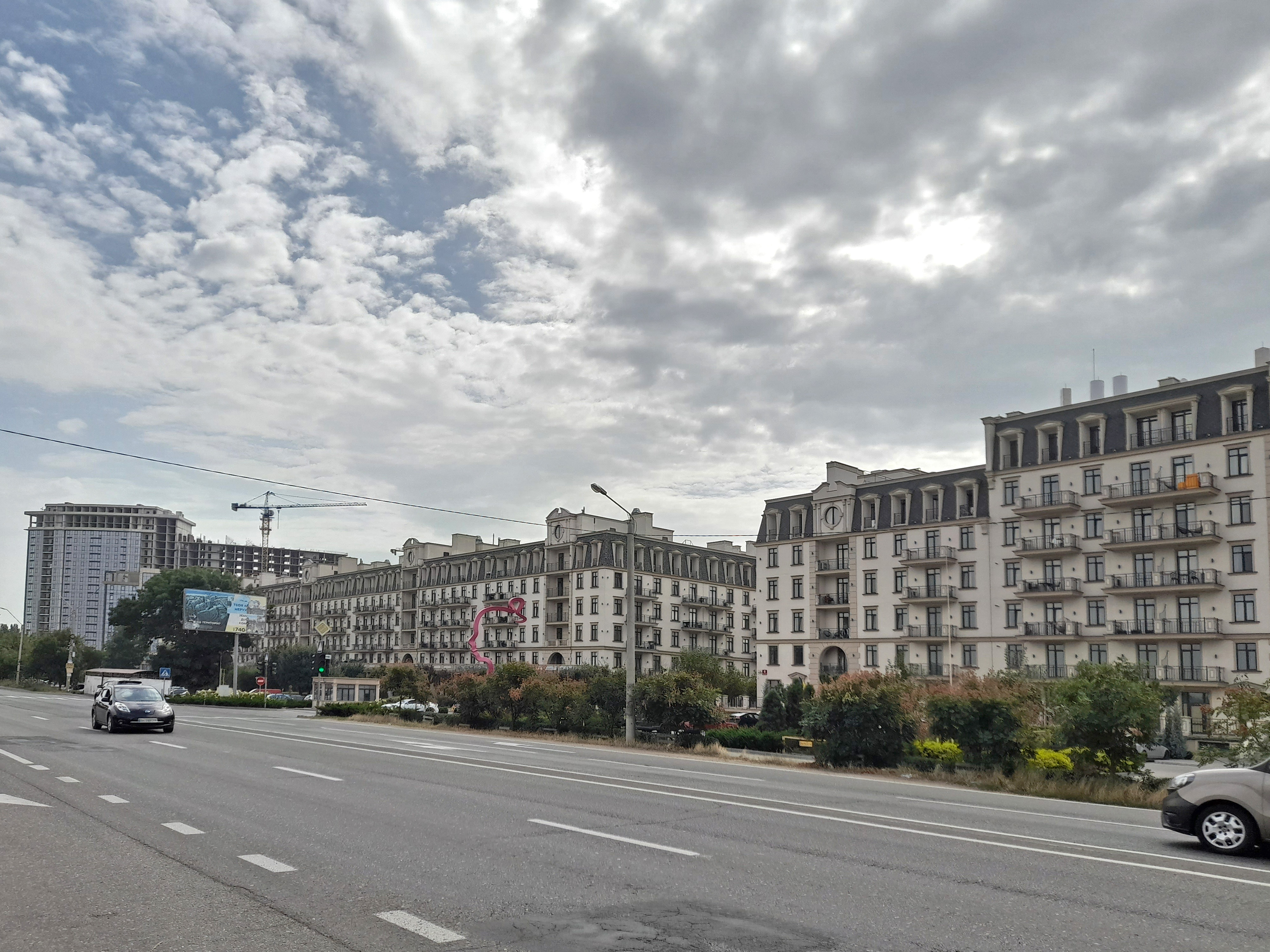
- Modern apartment buildings

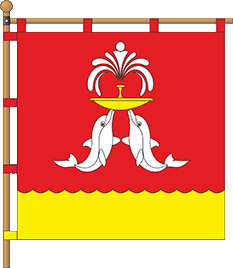
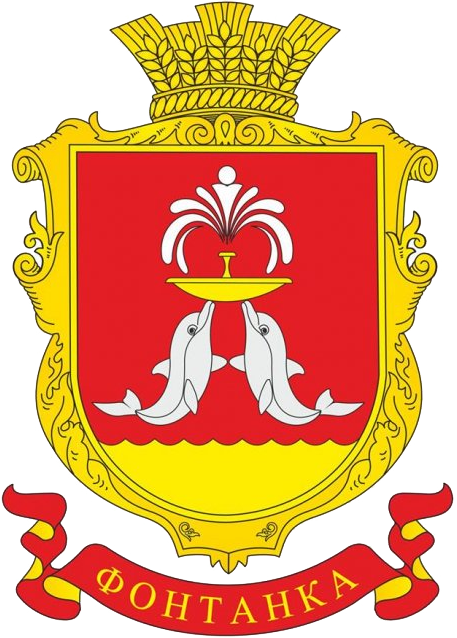
- Flag Coat of arms

- Location within Odesa Oblast Location within Ukraine
- Coordinates: 46°33′52″N 30°51′31″E
- Country: Ukraine
- Oblast: Odesa Oblast
- Raion: Odesa Raion
- Hromada: Fontanka rural hromada
- Date Established: 1892

Area
  - Total: 4.2 km^{2} (1.6 sq mi)

Population (2020)
  - Total: 6,260
  - Density: 1,500/km^{2} (3,900/sq mi)
- Time zone: UTC+2 (EET (Kyiv))
  - Summer (DST): UTC+3 (EEST)
- Postal code: 67571
- Area code: +380 4855

Fontanka (Ukrainian: Фонтанка) is a village in Odesa Raion, Odesa Oblast (province) of Ukraine. It hosts the administration of Fontanka rural hromada, one of the hromadas of Ukraine.

Dachne was previously located in Lyman Raion until it was abolished and its territory was merged into Odesa Raion on 18 July 2020 as part of the administrative reform of Ukraine, which reduced the number of raions of Odesa Oblast to seven.
