= Highway M28 (Ukraine) =

Highway in Ukraine

Highway M28
- Автошлях М28

Route information
- Length: 49 km (30 mi)
- Existed: 2013–present

Major junctions
- West end: M 14 in Kryzhanivka
- South end: M 14 in Sychavka

Location
- Country: Ukraine
- Oblasts: Odesa

Highway system
- Roads in Ukraine; State Highways
← M 27	→ M 29

M28 is a Ukrainian international highway (M-highway) in southern Ukraine that runs from Odesa to Pivdenne along the coast of Black Sea. Until 1 January 2013, the route was known as territorial road T-16-06.

== Main route ==
Main route and connections to/intersections with other H-highways in Ukraine.

Marker	Main settlements	Notes	Highway Interchanges
0 km	Kryzhanivka		M 14
49	Sychavka		M 14

== See also ==
- Roads in Ukraine
- Ukraine Highways
