= Dobroslav, Ukraine =

Rural locality in Odesa Oblast, Ukraine

Dobroslav Доброслав
- Rural settlement
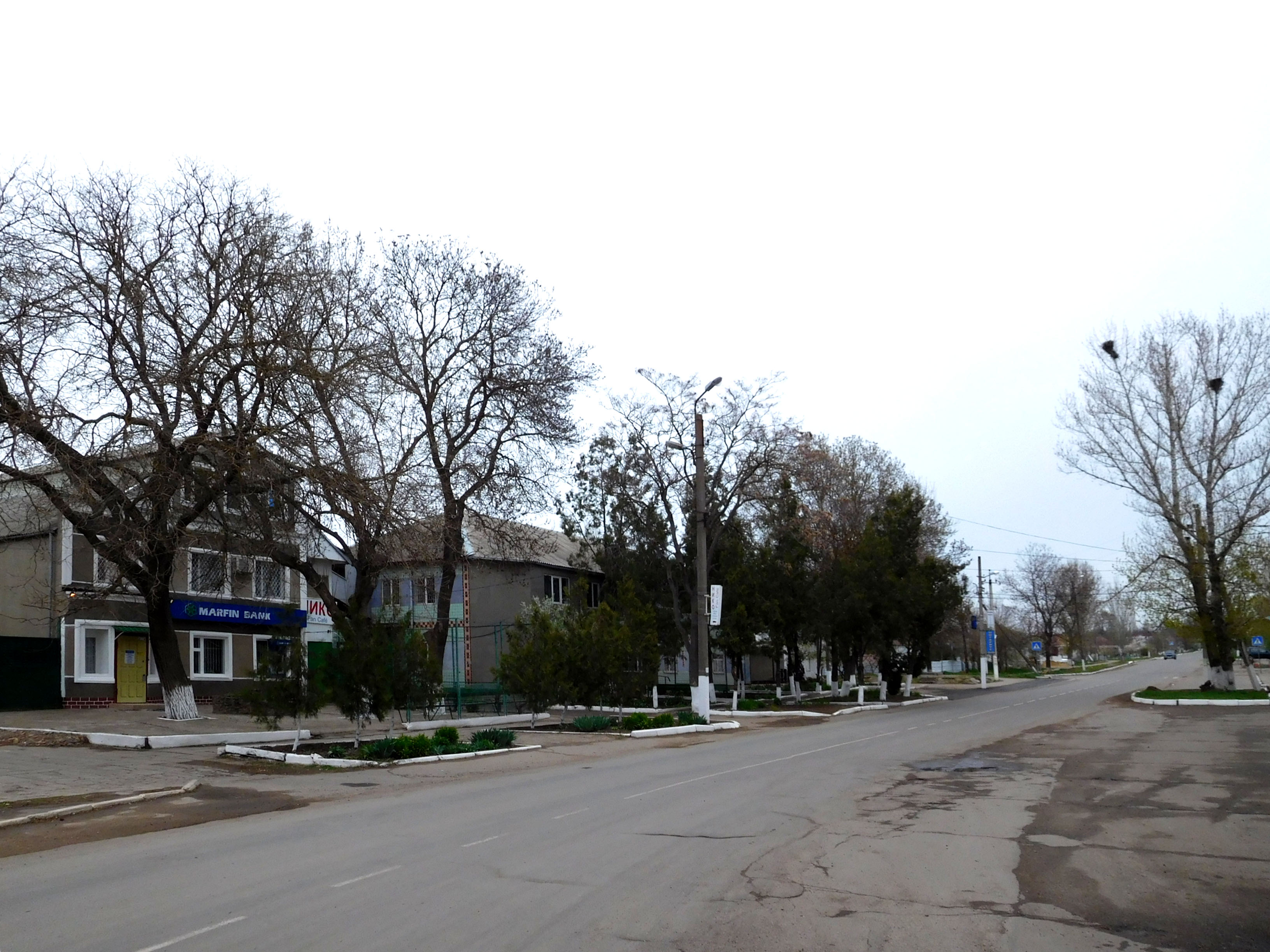

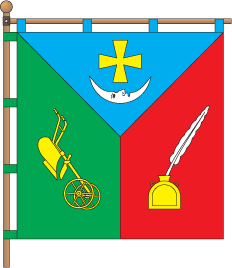
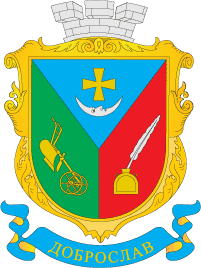
- Flag Coat of arms

- Location within Odesa Oblast Location within Ukraine
- Coordinates: 46°49′10″N 30°56′30″E
- Country: Ukraine
- Oblast: Odesa Oblast
- Raion: Odesa Raion
- Hromada: Dobroslav settlement hromada

Population (2022)
  - Total: 6,791
- Time zone: UTC+2 (EET)
  - Summer (DST): UTC+3 (EEST)

Dobroslav (Ukrainian: Доброслав; Russian: Доброслав), known as Antono-Kodyntseve until 1935 and Kominternivske from 1935 to 2016, is a rural settlement in Odesa Raion, Odesa Oblast, Ukraine. It hosts the administration of Dobroslav settlement hromada, one of the hromadas of Ukraine.

Dobroslav is located on the banks of the Small Adzhalyk River, which forms the Small Adzhalyk Estuary.

== History ==
The settlement was founded in 1802 when a landowner from the Poltava Governorate, Anton Kodintsev, purchased land in the area and relocated some of his serfs to the new site. The settlement was named Antonovo-Kodintseve after its owner.

By 1886, Antonovo-Kodintseve was a small town with 80 households and 410 inhabitants. It served as the administrative centre of the Antonovo-Kodintseve Volost, and had an Orthodox church, a school and a shop.

According to the 1897 census, the number of residents increased to 727 people (393 males and 334 females), of whom 725 were of the Orthodox faith.

On 7 August 1935, the Soviet authorities renamed Antono-Kodyntseve to Kominternivske, after the Communist International.

On 21 May 2016, the Verkhovna Rada adopted a decision to rename Kominternivske Raion to Lyman Raion, and Kominternivske to Dobroslav, according to the law prohibiting names of communist origin.

Until 18 July 2020, Dobroslav was the administrative center of Lyman Raion. The raion was abolished in July 2020 as part of the administrative reform of Ukraine, which reduced the number of raions of Odesa Oblast to seven. The area of Lyman Raion was split between Berezivka and Odesa Raions, with Dobroslav transferred to Odesa Raion.

Until 26 January 2024, Dobroslav was designated urban-type settlement. On this day, a new law entered into force which abolished this status, and Dobroslav became a rural settlement.

== Demographics ==
Native language as of the 2001 Ukrainian census:

Language	Number	Percentage
Ukrainian	6,095	93.68%
Russian	311	4.78%
Romani	39	0.60%
Bulgarian	28	0.43%
Moldovan	13	0.20%
Belarusian	6	0.09%
Armenian	5	0.08%
Other	5	0.08%
Total	6,506	100%

== Religion ==
Dobroslav is home to a community of the Evangelical Christians of the Holy Zionists (Евангельские христиане святые сионисты), also known as the Murashkovtsi (мурашковцы) after their founder Ivan Murashko. The movement emerged from Pentecostalism in Western Polesia in the early 1930s. Following decades of persecution and forced relocation under Soviet rule, several families settled in the town in the 1970s, later joined by others from Bendery and Dnipropetrovsk. By 2010 the community numbered 435 people living on the western edge of the town, where a prayer house was built in 2005. Members largely marry within the group and observe the Saturday Sabbath and Jewish dietary laws. The community is notable for its high birth rate, families typically have five or six children, and members do not use artificial contraception. Of the eleven women from the town awarded the honorary title Mother Heroine by presidential decree in February 2010, ten were members of the community.

== Economy ==
=== Transportation ===
The closest railway station is in Kremydivka, on a railway which connects Odesa with Mykolaiv and Voznesensk.

Dobroslav has access to Highway M14 connecting Odesa and Mykolaiv. Local roads connect it to Berezivka and Ivanivka.
