= Chornomorske settlement hromada =

Coordinates: 46°36′0.9″N 30°57′34.6″E

Chornomorske settlement hromada Чорноморська селищна громада
- Hromada
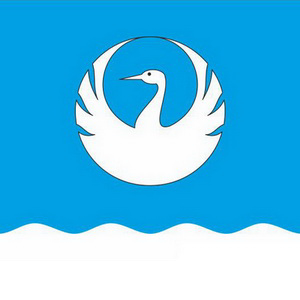
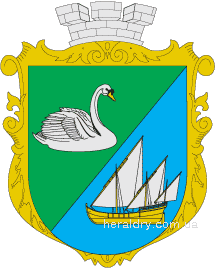
- Flag Coat of arms
- Interactive map of Chornomorske settlement hromada
- Country: Ukraine
- Oblast: Odesa Oblast
- Raion: Odesa Raion
- Admin. center: Chornomorske

Area
  - Total: 42.7 km^{2} (16.5 sq mi)

Population (2020)
  - Total: 7,910
  - Density: 185/km^{2} (480/sq mi)
- CATOTTG code: UA51100390000087217
- Settlements: 2
- Rural settlements: 1
- Villages: 1

Chornomorske settlement hromada (Ukrainian: Чорноморська селищна громада) is a hromada in Odesa Raion of Odesa Oblast in southwestern Ukraine. Population: 7,910 (2020 est.)

The hromada consists of a rural settlement of Chornomorske and a village of Hvardiyske.

== Links ==
- https://decentralization.gov.ua/newgromada/4394#
- картка Постанови ВР
