= Dobroslav settlement hromada =

Coordinates: 46°49′N 30°56′E

Dobroslav settlement hromada Доброславська селищна громада
- Hromada
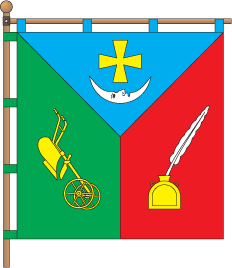
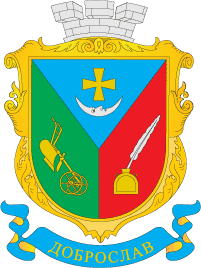
- Flag Coat of arms
- Interactive map of Dobroslav settlement hromada
- Country: Ukraine
- Oblast: Odesa Oblast
- Raion: Odesa Raion
- Admin. center: Dobroslav

Area
  - Total: 310.0 km^{2} (119.7 sq mi)

Population (2020)
  - Total: 15,091
  - Density: 48.68/km^{2} (126.1/sq mi)
- CATOTTG code: UA51100170000087238
- Settlements: 17
- Rural settlements: 2
- Villages: 15

Dobroslav settlement hromada (Ukrainian: Доброславська селищна громада) is a hromada in Odesa Raion of Odesa Oblast in southwestern Ukraine. Population: 15,091 (2020 est.)

The hromada consists of two rural settlement (Dobroslav and Stepove), and 15 villages:

- Blahodatne
- Kasiany
- Khrysto-Boteve
- Kremydivka
- Nove
- Onyskove
- Shevchenkove-Kut
- Stari Shompoly
- Stavky
- Troyandove
- Ulianivka
- Velyki Lamzaky
- Vovkivske
- Yakova
- Zorynove

== Links ==
- картка Постанови ВР
- https://izbirkom.org.ua/news/mestnoe-samoupravlenie-14/2021/u-dobroslavskij-selishnij-radi-obrali-starost/https://decentralization.gov.ua/newgromada/4331#
- https://izbirkom.org.ua/news/mestnoe-samoupravlenie-14/2021/u-dobroslavskij-selishnij-radi-obrali-starost/
