= Fontanka rural hromada =

Coordinates: 46°33′52″N 30°51′31″E

Fontanka rural hromada Фонтанська сільська громада
- Hromada
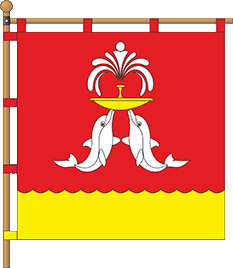
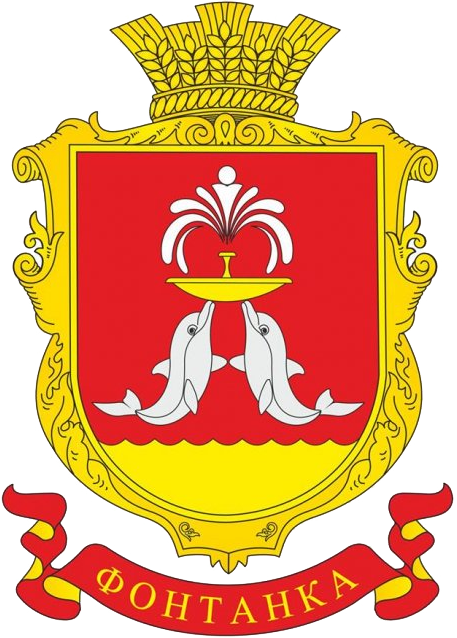
- Flag Coat of arms
- Interactive map of Fontanka rural hromada
- Country: Ukraine
- Oblast: Odesa Oblast
- Raion: Odesa Raion
- Admin. center: Fontanka

Area
  - Total: 57.6 km^{2} (22.2 sq mi)

Population (2020)
  - Total: 13,079
  - Density: 227/km^{2} (588/sq mi)
- CATOTTG code: UA51100350000087099
- Settlements: 7
- Rural settlements: 2
- Villages: 5

Fontanka rural hromada (Ukrainian: Фонтанська сільська громада) is a hromada in Odesa Raion of Odesa Oblast in southwestern Ukraine. Population: 13,079 (2020 est.)

The hromada consists of two rural settlement (Lisky and Svitle), and 5 villages:

- Vapniarka
- Kryzhanivka
- Nova Dofinivka
- Oleksandrivka
- Fontanka (seat of administration)

== Links ==
- https://decentralization.gov.ua/newgromada/4390#
