= Igor Uchytel =

Ukrainian academic (1955–2025)

Ihor Uchytel
- Ігор Учитель
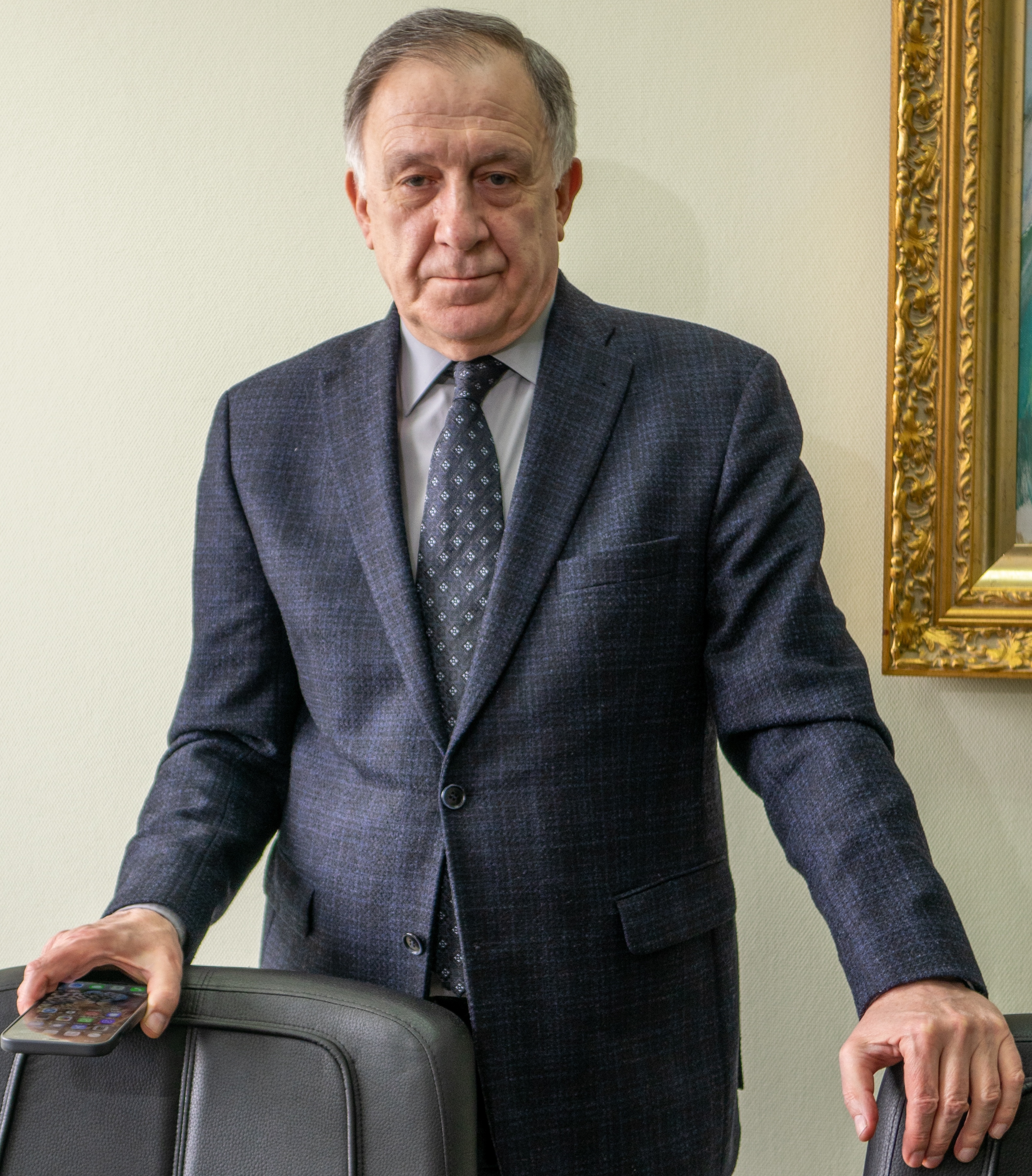

Chairman of the Supervisory Council of JSC ODESAGAZ

Deputy of the Odesa regional council

4rd convocation
- In office 31 March 2002 – 14 March 2006

5th convocation
- In office 26 March 2006 – 31 October 2010

6th convocation
- In office 31 October 2010 – 25 October 2015

7th convocation
- In office 25 October 2015 – 25 October 2020

Personal details
- Born: 31 March 1955 Odesa, Ukrainian SSR, USSR
- Died: 11 June 2025 (aged 70)
- Education: Odesa State Engineering and Construction Institute

Military service
- Allegiance: Soviet Union
- Branch/service: Soviet Army
- Years of service: 1973–1975

Ihor Leonidovych Uchytel (Ukrainian: Ігор Леонідович Учитель; 31 March 1955 – 11 June 2025) was a Ukrainian academic who was Chairman of the Supervisory Council of JSC ODESAGAZ, academician of the Academy of Technical Sciences of Ukraine and Associate Professor, Candidate of Technical Sciences.

== Life and career ==
Uchytel was born on 31 March 1955, in Odesa, Ukrainian SSR. In 1977, he graduated from the Odesa State Engineering and Construction Institute with a degree in Heat and Gas Supply and Ventilation.

During 1977–1978, he worked as a foreman of the emergency dispatch service of ODESAGAZ. Then he took the position of Рead of the design office of ODESAGAZ.

In 1986, he began working as the Deputy Head of the Odesa Interdistrict Production Department of the Gas Industry, and since 1990, as Chief Engineer of ODESAGAZ.

In 1998, Uchytel became the First Deputy Chairman of the Board of ODESAGAZ Open Joint-Stock Company. And in a year, he became the Chairman of the Board of OJSC ODESAGAZ.

From 2008 to 2020, Uchytel held the position of the President of the public joint-stock company ODESAGAZ. In 2020, he became Chairman of the Supervisory Council - JSC ODESAGAZ. He died on 11 June 2025, at the age of 70.

== Public activities and sponsorship ==
Uchytel was a charter member of the Rotary Club Odesa Richelieu.

He supported the creation of the museum of JSC ODESAGAZ and in 2013 he initiated the creation of the football team Black Sea Riviera (Fontanka). In 2015, with his support, a football section for children was found in Odesa and the same year, Uchytel sponsored the construction of a descent to the sea for the residents of Kryzhanivka village. He supported construction of a kindergarten in Fontanka village in 2018.

He served as Deputy of the Odesa regional council of IV, V, VI, and VII convocations. During that time, he headed the Standing Commission for Housing and Communal Services, Fuel and Energy Complex, and Energy Saving Sector. In 2020, he stepped down as Deputy of the Odeska Oblast Council.

== Scientific activity ==
Uchytel was elected as a full correspondent member of the Academy of Civil Engineering of Ukraine at the Odesa Territorial Branch on 22 December 1998. Two years later, on 4 February 2000, he became an academic advisor at the Engineering Academy of Ukraine.

Uchytel defended his thesis "Study of space-time dependences of the gas pipeline of Odesa" and received the degree of Candidate of Technical Sciences in "Geodesy" at the National University "Lviv Polytechnic" in 2001.

On 19 December 2009, the Academy of Technological Sciences of Ukraine named Uchytel the correspondent member in "Environmental Technologies and Geotechnologies.” And on 20 May 2011, he became an academician at the Academy of Technological Sciences of Ukraine and on 3 June 2011 – at the Engineering Academy of Ukraine.

Uchytel was elected as a full member of the Academy of Energy of Ukraine on 21 December 2013.

== Awards ==
On 3 September 2000, as the head of Odesagas JSC Uchytel received a diploma from the International Open Rating of Popularity and Quality of Goods and Services Golden Fortune with the title Laureate of the Rating.

On 24 August 2003, the NJS NAFTOGAZ of Ukraine awarded Uchytel an honorary award of the 1st degree.

Uchytel also received the honorary award of the Odesa mayor for services to the city on 27 August 2004. Head of the Odesa regional state administration awarded Uchytel the honorary award "60 years of liberation of Odesa region from fascist invaders" in the same year. The Ukrainian Society of Geodesy and Cartography gave the honorary award For Merits in Geodesy and Cartography of the 1st degree to Uchytel on 17 March 2006.

The Federation of Trade Unions of Ukraine awarded Uchytel the honorary award "For the Development of Social Partnership" on 20 August 2008.

Former President Victor Yushchenko awarded Uchytel the Order of Merit of the 3rd class on 25 December 2009.

Uchytel received an honorary award named after G.G. Maeazli of the III class on 2 September 2010, and of the II classя.

On 3 April 2014, the Certification Board of the Ministry of Education and Science, Youth and Sports awarded Uchytel the title of Associate Professor.

On 23 December 2014, Uchytel was awarded the title of Honorary Citizen of Odesa region.

== Bibliography ==
Uchytel was author and co-author of about 200 scientific papers, articles and monographs. In particular:

1. Gladkikh I.I., Kapochkin B.B., Uchytel I.L. Problems of geodynamic risk mapping according to the analysis of the emergency state of gas networks // Ukrainian interdepartmental scientific-thematic collection Geodesy, cartography and aerial photography, 2000, No. 60, pp. 98–101.

2. Matiko F.D., Uchytel I.L. Modeling of the temperature regime of a gas flow during its flow through narrowing devices. Visnyk Natsionalnoho universytetu "L'vivs'ka politekhnika" [Bulletin of the National University "Lviv Polytechnic"], 2003, No. 476, pp. 27–32.

3. Matiko F.D., Uchytel I.L. Research of temperature regime of gas pipeline sections with variable flow parameters. Visnyk Natsionalnoho universytetu "L'vivs'ka politekhnika" [Bulletin of the National University "Lviv Polytechnic"], 2004, No. 506, pp. 245–250.

4. Kapochkin B.B., Uchytel I.L., Yaroshenko V.M. Variability of deformation processes on a global scale in man-made manifestations. Naukovo-praktychna zbirka "Suchasni dosyahnennya heodezychnoyi nauky ta vyrobnytstva" [Scientific digest "Modern achievements of geodetic science and production"], 2005, No. 2, pp. 89–107.

5. Kapochkin B.B., Uchytel I.L., Yaroshenko V.M. About the problems of modern geodynamics. Naukovo-praktychna zbirka "Suchasni dosyahnennya heodezychnoyi nauky ta vyrobnytstva" [Scientific digest "Modern achievements of geodetic science and production"], 2005, No. 2, pp. 108–112 (in Russian).

6. Kapochkin B.B., Uchytel I.L., Yaroshenko V.M. Assessment of geodeformation in the fall of 1998. Naukovo-praktychna zbirka "Suchasni dosyahnennya heodezychnoyi nauky ta vyrobnytstva" [Scientific digest "Modern achievements of geodetic science and production"], 2006, No.1 (11), pp. 138–145.

7. Kapochkin B.B., Uchytel I.L., Yaroshenko V.M. Use of sea level measurement data in geodynamics. Fundamentalni doslidzhennya nayvazhlyvishykh problem pryrodnychykh nauk na osnovi intehratsiynykh protsesiv v osviti ta nautsi [Fundamental research of the most important problems of natural sciences on the basis of integration processes in education and science], 2006, p. 43-44.

8. Kapochkin B.B., Uchytel I.L., Yaroshenko V.M. Dynamics of slow earthquakes according to monitoring data at the Odesa geodynamic landfill "Naftogaz of Ukraine". Monitorynh navkolyshnoho pryrodnoho seredovyshcha: naukovo-metodychne, normatyvne, tekhnichne, prohramne zabezpechennya [Environmental monitoring: scientific and methodological, regulatory, technical, software], 2006, pp. 50–52.

9. Kapochkin B.B., Uchytel I.L., Yaroshenko V.M. On the lack of regulatory framework for taking into account the dangers of "slow earthquakes". Monitorynh navkolyshnoho pryrodnoho seredovyshcha: naukovo-metodychne, normatyvne, tekhnichne, prohramne zabezpechennya [Environmental monitoring: scientific and methodological, regulatory, technical, software], 2006, pp. 52–54.

10. Kapochkin B.B., Uchytel I.L., Yaroshenko V.M. Anomalous geodeformations in the fall of 1998. – Naukovo-praktychna konferentsiya "Vplyv ruynivnykh poveney ta nebezpechnykh heopolitychnykh protsesiv na funktsionuvannya inzhenernykh sporud" [Symp. "The impact of destructive floods and dangerous geopolitical processes on the functioning of engineering structures"], 2006, pp. 40–43.

11. Kapochkin B.B., Uchytel I.L., Yaroshenko V.M. Changes in the level of the oceans as a tool for studying global geodynamics. Naukovo-praktychna zbirka "Suchasni dosyahnennya heodezychnoyi nauky ta vyrobnytstva" [Scientific digest "Modern achievements of geodetic science and production"], 2007, No. 2 (14), pp. 79–88.

12. Uchytel I.L., Yaroshenko V.M., Bauraktutan Selykh. Accidents of gas pipelines of geodynamic genesis. Naukovo-praktychna konferentsiya "Ekolohichni problemy naftohazovoho kompleksu" [Symp. "Environmental problems of the oil and gas complex"], 2007, p. 25-28.

13. Kapochkin B.B., Uchytel I.L., Yaroshenko V.M. Changes in the oceans level as a tool for studying global geodynamics. Naukovo-praktychna zbirka "Suchasni dosyahnennya heodezychnoyi nauky ta vyrobnytstva" [Scientific digest "Modern achievements of geodetic science and production"], 2007, No. 2 (14), pp. 79–88.

14. Kapochkin B.B., Uchytel I.L., Yaroshenko V.M. Geodynamic movements in 2008. Naukovo-praktychna zbirka "Suchasni dosyahnennya heodezychnoyi nauky ta vyrobnytstva" [Scientific digest "Modern achievements of geodetic science and production"], 2009, No. 1 (17), pp. 333–337.

15. Polunin M., Polunin Yu., Uchytel I.L. Heat saving during heat supply from binary heat resources. Visnyk Odeskoho derzhavnoyi akademiyi budivnytstva ta arkhitektury [Digest of the Odesa State Academy of Civil Engineering and Architecture], No. 36, pp. 340–346.

16. Kapochkin B.B., Uchytel I.L., Yaroshenko V.M., Mityuchenko V.I. Geodynamics of the Black Sea region in 1993–2009. Naukovo-praktychna zbirka "Suchasni dosyahnennya heodezychnoyi nauky ta vyrobnytstva" [Scientific digest "Modern achievements of geodetic science and production"], 2010, Vol. 1 (19), pp. 95–102.

17. Kapochkin B.B., Uchytel I.L., Yaroshenko V.M., Voitenko S.P. Scientific priority and current study state of the natural phenomenon of "slow" earthquakes. Novi tekhnolohiyi v budivnytstvi [New technologies in construction], 2011, No. 2, pp. 66–73.

18. Kapochkin B.B., Uchytel I.L., Yaroshenko V.M. Geodynamic monitoring by remote methods. Naukovo-praktychna zbirka "Suchasni dosyahnennya heodezychnoyi nauky ta vyrobnytstva" [Scientific digest "Modern achievements of geodetic science and production"], 2011, Vol. 1 (21), pp. 276–279.

19. Korban V.M., Kucherenko N.P., Kapochkin B.B., Uchytel I.L., Yaroshenko V.M. Prospects for high-frequency geodeformations monitoring by satellite methods. Naukovo-praktychna zbirka "Suchasni dosyahnennya heodezychnoyi nauky ta vyrobnytstva" [Scientific digest "Modern achievements of geodetic science and production"], 2011, Vol. 2 (22), pp. 212–217.

20. Korban V.M., Kucherenko N.P., Kapochkin B.B., Uchytel I.L., Makhalov V.V. Satellite technologies for geodynamic processes monitoring. Zbirnyk statey "III Vseukrayinskoho zyizdu ekolohiv z mizhnarodnoyu uchastyu" [Collection of articles "III All-Ukrainian Congress of Ecologists with International Participation"], 2011, Vol.1, pp. 179–182.

21. Kapochkin B.B., Uchytel I.L., Yaroshenko V.M. Geodeformation process and regional risks. Naukovo-praktychna zbirka "Suchasni dosyahnennya heodezychnoyi nauky ta vyrobnytstva" [Scientific digest "Modern achievements of geodetic science and production"], 2012, Vol. 1 (23), pp. 108–114.

22. Kapochkin B.B., Uchytel I.L., Yaroshenko V.M. Methods of permanent GPS-networks using for reversible geodeformations monitoring. Naukovo-praktychna zbirka "Suchasni dosyahnennya heodezychnoyi nauky ta vyrobnytstva" [Scientific digest "Modern achievements of geodetic science and production"], 2012, Vol. 2 (24), pp. 195–201.

23. Kapochkin B.B., Uchytel I.L. Features of the manifestation of destructive aseismic geodeformations. Naukovo-praktychna zbirka "Suchasni dosyahnennya heodezychnoyi nauky ta vyrobnytstva" [Scientific digest "Modern achievements of geodetic science and production"], 2013, Vol. 2 (26), pp. 138–140.

24. Kapochkin B.B., Uchytel I.L. Classification of fast-flowing deformations of the oceanic crust. Naukovo-praktychna zbirka "Suchasni dosyahnennya heodezychnoyi nauky ta vyrobnytstva" [Scientific digest "Modern achievements of geodetic science and production"], 2014, Vol. 1 (27), pp. 141–143.

25. Kapochkin B.B., Uchytel I.L. Spatial patterns of fast-flowing deformations of the oceanic crust. Naukovo-praktychna zbirka "Suchasni dosyahnennya heodezychnoyi nauky ta vyrobnytstva" [Scientific digest "Modern achievements of geodetic science and production"], 2014, Vol. 1 (27), p. 144-147.

26. Voitenko S.P., Kapochkin B.B., Uchytel I.L. Violation of the geological environment cohesion during tidal geodeformations, as a cause of man-made accidents. Novi tekhnolohiyi v budivnytstvi [New technologies in construction], 2014, No. 27-28, pp. 53–58.

27. Voitenko S.P., B.B. Kapochkin, I.L. Uchytel. Technologies for the growth of geological middle ground monitoring, as the cause of man-made accidents. Eastern-European Journal of Enterprise Technologies, 2014, Vol. 4 No. 10 (70), pp. 31–36.

28. Kapochkin B.B., Uchytel I.L. The need to take into account the destructive seismic geodeformations in the development of construction technologies. Eastern-European Journal of Enterprise Technologies, 2015, Vol. 1 No. 1 (73), pp. 31–36.

29. Yaroshenko V.M., Uchytel I.L., Baranyk S.V., Golubenko V.I., Mytinsky V.M. Geotechnical substantiation of high-rise buildings construction in Odesa. Visnyk Odeskoyi derzhavnoyi akademiyi budivnytstva ta arkhitektury [Bulletin of the Odesa State Academy of Civil Engineering and Architecture], 2016, Vol. 64, p. 209-214.

== Monographs ==
- Kapochkin B.B., Uchytel I.L., Yaroshenko V.M., Gladkikh I.I. Osnovy neoheodinamiki, merezhi hazoprovodiv yak element deformatsiynoho monitorynhu [Fundamentals of neogeodynamics, gas pipeline networks as an element of deformation monitoring]. Odesa, Astroprint, 2000, 144 pages.
- Kapochkin B.B., Uchytel I.L., Yaroshenko V.M., Voitenko S.P.. Heodynamika. Osnovy kinematychnoyi heodeziyi [Geodynamics. Fundamentals of kinematic geodesy]. Odesa, Astroprint, 2007, 264 pages.
- Uchytel I.L. Ruynivni vlastyvosti heodeformatsii [Destructive aspects of geodeformation]. Odesa, Astroprint, 2010, 222 pages.
- Kapochkin B.B., Uchytel I.L. Zmina paradyhmy suchasnoyi heodynamiky ta seysmotektoniky [Paradigm shift in modern geodynamics and seismotectonics]. LAPLAMBERT AcademicPublishing, 2014, 80 pages.

== Thesis ==
1. Uchytel I.L. Avtoreferat Doslidzhennya prostorovo-chasovykh zalezhnostey avariynosti hazoprovodiv m.Odesy [Abstract Research of space-time dependences of gas pipelines emergency of Odesa]. Lviv, 2001.

2. Uchytel I.L. Dysertatsiya na zdobuttya naukovoho stupenya kandydata tekhnichnykh nauk Doslidzhennya prostorovo-chasovykh zalezhnostey avariynosti hazoprovodiv m.Odesy [Research of space-time dependences of emergency of gas pipelines of Odesa. Candidate Diss.] Lviv, 2001.
